= Foreign relations of Libya =

The foreign relations of Libya were largely reset at the end of the Libyan Civil War, with the overthrow of Muammar Gaddafi and the Second Libyan Civil War. The current Minister of Foreign Affairs since 15 March 2021 is Najla Mangoush. Although many foreign embassies in Tripoli closed down in 2014 due to the conflict in Libya from 2011 onwards, by the end of 2017 thirty diplomatic missions had reopened in the Libyan capital.

== Foreign policy of Libya ==
In its 5 March 2011 "Founding Statement", the council stated, "[We] request from the international community to fulfill its obligations to protect the Libyan people from any further genocide and crimes against humanity without any direct military intervention on Libyan soil." Ali Al-Issawi was designated the Council's foreign affairs spokesperson in March 2011. Mahmoud Jibril later replaced Ali Al-Issawi and was designated as the Head of International Affairs.

The NTC has also called on the international community to render assistance to its efforts to dislodge Colonel Muammar Gaddafi, the ruler of Libya since 1969, and his loyalists. Officials have asked for medical supplies, money, and weapons, among other forms of foreign aid. In late June 2011, it proposed using internationally based frozen assets belonging to Gaddafi and his inner circle as collateral for loans, with Finance Minister Ali Tarhouni warning that his government is virtually out of money. The NTC has previously asked for those assets to be unfrozen and transferred to Benghazi, a request officials of the Obama administration in the United States indicated they would try to fulfill.

NTC officials have said that they intend to reward countries that have been early to recognise the council as the legitimate representative of Libya, as well as countries that have been involved in the international military intervention to suppress Gaddafi's forces. Among the incentives the council has offered to these countries, which it considers to be allies, are favorable oil contracts and other economic ties. On 15 July 2011, a council spokesman told members of the Libya Contact Group meeting in Istanbul, Turkey, that his government would not forge any new oil contracts and that an elected government must be in place before new deals could be made.

After anti-Gaddafi forces stormed Tripoli, the Libyan capital city, the information manager at NTC-run oil firm AGOCO said on 22 August that once Libya resumed oil exports, its new government "may have some political issues with Russia, China and Brazil" and favor Western and Arab countries that supported the uprising against Gaddafi when awarding oil contracts. However, on 23 August, Brazilian Foreign Minister Antonio Patriota said his government had been assured that if the NTC took power in Libya, "contracts will be respected" and Brazil would not be punished for its stance. On 1 September, an NTC representative in Paris claimed that the new Libyan government would not award oil contracts based on politics, though he said that a number of Western companies, including BP, Total, Eni, and "major American companies", had a particularly "good track record in the Libyan oil sector".

In November 2025, Tunisia, Algeria and Egypt, in coordination with the United Nations Support Mission in Libya, called for national unity in Libya.

== Foreign policy history ==
The foreign relations of the Libya under Muammar Gaddafi (1969–2011) underwent much fluctuation and change. They were marked by severe tension with the West and by other national policies in the Middle East and Africa, including the Libyan government's financial and military support for numerous paramilitary and rebel groups.

== Diplomatic relations ==
List of countries which Libya maintains diplomatic relations with:

#	Country	Date
1	United Kingdom	24 December 1951
2	United States	24 December 1951
3	France	1 January 1952
4	Italy	21 February 1952
5	Pakistan	16 July 1952
6	India	20 July 1952
7	Turkey	30 December 1952
8	Greece	1952
9	Egypt	3 September 1953
10	Iraq	21 May 1955
11	Germany	3 June 1955
12	Netherlands	24 June 1955
13	Russia	4 September 1955
14	Serbia	2 October 1955
15	Belgium	15 May 1956
16	Tunisia	22 June 1956
17	Saudi Arabia	1956
18	Japan	2 June 1957
19	Morocco	17 September 1958
20	Ghana	1 February 1960
21	Austria	22 April 1960
22	Czech Republic	16 May 1960
23	Yemen	22 August 1960
24	Sweden	25 August 1960
25	Spain	14 January 1961
26	Lebanon	12 June 1961
27	Jordan	30 August 1961
28	Switzerland	5 September 1961
29	Denmark	17 October 1961
30	Kuwait	24 December 1961
31	Chad	1962
32	Nigeria	1962
33	Bulgaria	1 July 1963
34	Algeria	24 August 1963
35	Poland	2 December 1963
36	Sudan	1963
37	Syria	1963
38	Malta	11 June 1965
39	Venezuela	18 June 1965
40	Finland	28 September 1965
41	Niger	17 November 1965
42	Norway	20 July 1966
43	Brazil	9 April 1967
44	Hungary	2 July 1967
45	Iran	30 December 1967
46	Somalia	30 December 1967
47	Guinea	26 March 1968
48	Canada	26 October 1968
49	Democratic Republic of the Congo	June 1969
50	Cameroon	3 August 1969
51	Mauritania	9 January 1970
52	Albania	6 May 1970
53	Central African Republic	6 May 1971
54	Chile	20 May 1971
55	Afghanistan	1 August 1971
56	Senegal	2 February 1972
57	Uganda	13 February 1972
58	United Arab Emirates	24 May 1972
59	Guyana	9 August 1972
60	Mali	17 November 1972
61	Sri Lanka	1972
62	Panama	21 March 1973
63	Benin	31 March 1973
64	Republic of the Congo	7 April 1973
65	Burundi	19 April 1973
66	Trinidad and Tobago	September 1973
67	Gabon	1 November 1973
68	Togo	3 November 1973
69	Cyprus	8 November 1973
70	Argentina	12 December 1973
71	Gambia	1973
72	North Korea	23 January 1974
73	Madagascar	9 February 1974
74	Romania	14 February 1974
75	Liberia	1 April 1974
76	Malaysia	22 April 1974
77	Peru	28 April 1974
78	Rwanda	10 May 1974
79	Guinea-Bissau	4 July 1974
80	Costa Rica	30 November 1974
81	Bangladesh	14 December 1974
82	Bahrain	22 February 1975
83	Vietnam	15 March 1975
84	Tanzania	15 April 1975
85	Mexico	6 August 1975
86	Ethiopia	11 October 1975
87	Maldives	17 November 1975
88	Sierra Leone	18 November 1975
89	Qatar	19 November 1975
90	Nepal	30 December 1975
91	Portugal	1975
92	Mauritius	17 February 1976
93	Cuba	18 February 1976
94	Angola	30 March 1976
95	Comoros	1 April 1976
96	Suriname	17 May 1976
97	Mongolia	16 June 1976
98	Jamaica	24 June 1976
99	Laos	26 July 1976
100	Seychelles	15 August 1976
101	Philippines	17 November 1976
102	Botswana	14 March 1977
103	Thailand	16 March 1977
104	São Tomé and Príncipe	March 1977
105	Ireland	2 July 1977
106	Australia	4 January 1978
107	Djibouti	24 July 1978
108	China	9 August 1978
109	Ecuador	30 August 1978
110	Kenya	7 November 1978
111	Haiti	18 January 1979
112	Tonga	2 March 1979
113	Zimbabwe	June 1980
114	South Korea	29 December 1980
115	Burkina Faso	12 January 1981
116	Nicaragua	19 May 1981
117	Mozambique	December 1981
118	New Zealand	4 May 1983
119	Vanuatu	29 May 1986
120	Zambia	1986
121	Ivory Coast	6 October 1989
122	Cambodia	16 February 1990
123	Namibia	8 May 1990
124	Uruguay	4 October 1991
125	Indonesia	17 October 1991
126	Kazakhstan	13 March 1992
127	Azerbaijan	16 March 1992
128	Ukraine	17 March 1992
129	Bosnia and Herzegovina	28 October 1992
130	Turkmenistan	8 December 1992
131	Slovakia	1 January 1993
132	Kyrgyzstan	25 February 1993
133	Georgia	10 May 1994
134	South Africa	14 May 1994
135	Moldova	9 December 1994
136	North Macedonia	14 April 1995
137	Luxembourg	28 February 1996
138	Colombia	16 May 1996
139	Belarus	30 August 1996
—	Holy See	10 March 1997
140	Eritrea	5 February 1998
141	Malawi	15 February 1998
142	Tajikistan	27 April 1998
143	San Marino	20 October 1999
144	Croatia	30 March 2000
145	Armenia	19 June 2000
146	Grenada	24 July 2000
147	Dominica	10 January 2001
148	Equatorial Guinea	11 February 2001
149	Lesotho	20 March 2003
150	Iceland	15 March 2004
151	Brunei	15 March 2005
152	Saint Vincent and the Grenadines	2 December 2005
153	Singapore	3 March 2006
154	Latvia	16 February 2007
155	Honduras	12 July 2007
156	Antigua and Barbuda	31 August 2007
157	Guatemala	5 September 2007
158	Slovenia	19 September 2007
159	Dominican Republic	28 September 2007
160	Lithuania	11 June 2008
161	Bolivia	13 August 2008
162	Estonia	17 December 2008
163	Saint Lucia	30 October 2009
164	Cape Verde	February 2010
165	Uzbekistan	27 October 2010
166	Montenegro	9 February 2011
167	Paraguay	9 February 2011
—	Kosovo	14 May 2014
168	South Sudan	20 March 2024
169	Eswatini	Unknown
170	Oman	Unknown
—	State of Palestine	Unknown

== Bilateral relations ==
=== Africa ===
Country	Formal Relations Began	Notes
Algeria	24 August 1963	See Algeria–Libya relations The NTC occasionally took an aggressive posture toward governments it accused of supporting Gaddafi in the civil war, especially that of Algeria, which it claimed allowed Gaddafi's government to transport mercenaries and military equipment through its territory. The NTC reacted harshly after several members of the Gaddafi government, including members of his family, entered Algeria and were granted political asylum in Algiers. On 29 August 2011, it said that Algeria sheltering Gaddafi or his family members would be viewed as an "act of aggression". However, while the Algerian government permitted Gaddafi's relatives to remain in the country, it warned Aisha Gaddafi at least twice over political comments she made criticising the NTC while in Algeria. On 16 April 2012, Libyan leader Mustafa Abdul Jalil met with Algerian President Abdulaziz Bouteflika in Algiers. After the meeting, he expressed confidence "that [Algeria] would not shelter those who represent a threat for Libya’s security", an apparent reference to members of Gaddafi's family who were granted asylum in Algeria the previous year. Libyan and Algerian officials also discussed cooperation on border security.
Burkina Faso	12 January 1981	See Burkina Faso–Libya relations
Egypt	3 September 1953	See Egypt–Libya relations Both countries established diplomatic relations on 3 September 1953 when first Libyan Minister to Egypt Ibrahim El-Senoussi present his credentials to General Naguib. During the Libyan Civil War, it was rumoured that Egypt had sent Unit 777, a special forces division, to clandestinely aid Libyan revolutionaries on the eastern front. These reports were never confirmed, but established an early narrative that the post-revolutionary government of Egypt was seeking to aid a revolution in neighbouring Libya as part of a North African solidarity effort. Egypt supported the Arab League's readmission of Libya under the NTC in August 2011, officially recognising the NTC on the same day, 22 August, as the pan-Arab organisation, headed by former Egyptian Foreign Minister Nabil Elaraby, voted to do so.
Ethiopia	11 October 1975	Both countries established diplomatic relations on 11 October 1975 when first Libyan Ambassador to Ethiopia presented his credentials.
Guinea-Bissau	4 July 1974	Both countries established diplomatic relations on 4 July 1974 when was signed agreement to open an Embassy of Libya in the capital of Guinea Bissau.
Liberia	1 April 1974	See Liberia–Libya relations
Mali	17 November 1972	See Libya–Mali relations Both countries established diplomatic relations on 17 November 1972 when the first Libyan Ambassador to Mali, Muhammad Ahmad Mograhi, presented his credentials to President Mousa Traore. In the aftermath of the Libyan civil war, Malian troops engaged in sporadic battles with Tuareg ex-mercenaries returning from fighting on Gaddafi's side. Authorities in Mali recognised the danger as early as October 2011. After the death of Muammar Gaddafi, Malian President Amadou Toumani Touré said he accepted the NTC's authority and, together with Algerian President Abdelaziz Bouteflika, expressed his hopes for "a rapid settlement of the crisis in this country, in line with the aspirations of the Libyan people". In January 2012, Mali became the first African nation to agree to accept prisoners convicted by the International Criminal Court, which wants to try Saif al-Islam Gaddafi and several other former Libyan regime officials being held by ex-revolutionary groups in Libya. The unilaterally declared secession of Azawad from Mali, the military victory of the National Movement for the Liberation of Azawad, Ansar Dine, and other rebel groups in the vast Malian north, and the coup against President Amadou Toumani Touré in 2012 were attributed in part to the outflow of weapons from Libya after the war, which purportedly increased instability in the Sahel.
Mauritania	9 January 1970	See Libya–Mauritania relations
Namibia	8 May 1990	Libya has an embassy in Windhoek.; Namibia is accredited to Libya from its embassy in Algiers, Algeria.
Niger	17 November 1965	See Libya–Niger relations Libyan relations with Niger since the formation of the National Transitional Council have been somewhat tenuous, though Niger recognised the NTC as Libya's legitimate governing authority on 27 August 2011. In early September 2011, a large convoy of Libyan military vehicles that the NTC said included stockpiles of gold bullion belonging to the Libyan treasury, as well as members of the Gaddafi government, crossed into Niger, allegedly with assistance from Nigerien Tuaregs. The NTC called on the Nigerien government to stop the convoy and arrest wanted members of the government, warning of consequences for Libya–Niger relations if it failed to do so. However, after briefly denying the convoy's presence in Niger, the Nigerien government later said it was considering granting refugee status to the Libyans, including military commanders Ali Kana and Mansour Dhao, both wanted by the NTC on charges of crimes against the Libyan people, as they were not sought by the International Criminal Court. A similar scenario played out when Al-Saadi Gaddafi, one of Muammar Gaddafi's sons and a top military commander during the war, entered Niger and was placed under house arrest by the government but was then granted refuge in the country, over the protests of the NTC and its allies. On 1 October, Nigerien Justice Minister Marou Amadou reiterated his government's refusal to extradite Al-Saadi Gaddafi, but said the NTC was welcome to interrogate him in Niamey, Niger's capital. The Nigerien government has officially acknowledged receiving 32 wanted members of the government, but refuses to turn them over to the NTC on humanitarian grounds. On 11 November, Nigerien President Mahamadou Issoufou said his government officially decided to grant Al-Saadi Gaddafi asylum. After Saadi Gaddafi made comments calling for an uprising against the NTC in Libya, a spokesman for the Libyan interim authority said on 11 February 2012 that Tripoli demanded Niger extradite the Gaddafi son and other ex-regime officials to face trial in Libya. The Nigerien government must send the fugitives from justice back to their home country, the NTC spokesman warned, in order for Niger to "preserve its relationship and interests" in Libya. However, Nigerien government officials rejected the demand, citing the country's policy of not extraditing anyone who could face capital punishment.
South Africa	14 May 1994	See Libya–South Africa relations The relationship between Libya and South Africa was historically friendly prior to the civil war, and the South African government maintained a policy of neutrality during the conflict by refusing to recognise the NTC until after the UN General Assembly voted to do so. South Africa did, however, vote for United Nations Security Council Resolution 1973 establishing a no-fly zone over Libya, though President Jacob Zuma later said he would have instructed the South African representative to vote against it if he had known that it would lead to a NATO-led bombing campaign. South African officials met with representatives of both the NTC and the Gaddafi government during the war. As an ostensibly neutral party, the South African government championed the African Union "roadmap" to peace, designed in part by Zuma, a member of the AU Ad Hoc High Level Committee on Libya. It ultimately recognised the NTC under considerable international pressure in September 2011, just a month before the war's end. In early 2012, months after the collapse of Gaddafi's regime, Zuma complained to the United Nations Security Council that the crisis in Libya had "now grown to be a regional problem" as a result of the UN failing to work with the AU during the war. During the war, it was repeatedly rumoured that South Africa would offer Muammar Gaddafi and members of his family asylum, and during the Battle of Tripoli, some outlets reported that South African aircraft were on standby to whisk the Libyan leader and members of his government out of the country. The South African government denied these reports. It also denied allegations that surfaced the week after Tripoli fell claiming it was ready to facilitate Gaddafi's exile to Burkina Faso. After Gaddafi was captured and killed in October 2011, the South African government issued a statement saying it hoped the fall of Sirte would bring about peace in Libya.
Tunisia	22 June 1956	See Libya–Tunisia relations Both countries established diplomatic relations on 22 June 1956 when Mr. Abdul Salam Bsaikri, the first Libyan Ambassador to Tunisia presented his credentials to the Bey of Tunis. During the civil war, Tunisia remained officially neutral. However, as a neighbouring state, it took in tens of thousands of Libyan refugees fleeing the conflict, setting up camps along the international border. On 20 August 2011, the interim government of Tunisia recognised the NTC as Libya's legitimate authority. After the 2011 Tunisian elections, ad interim Tunisian President Moncef Marzouki vowed to build close relations with Libya's post-revolutionary government. At a conference in Benghazi in late 2011, Libyan officials agreed to give Tunisia preferred status above all other nations in business and commerce. Marzouki's first official international trip as president was to Tripoli in early January 2012, where he met with Libyan leaders. Although the Financial Times reported on the state visit as a sign of deepening ties between the two countries, Libyan authorities reportedly complained to Marzouki's delegation over the presence of wanted ex-officials of the Gaddafi government in Tunisia, and Marzouki insisted the Libyans do more to secure the international border.

=== Americas ===
Country	Formal Relations Began	Notes
Argentina	12 December 1973	See Argentina–Libya relations: Argentina has embassy in Tripoli; Libya has embassy in Buenos Aires
Bolivia	13 August 2008	See Bolivia–Libya relations
Brazil	9 April 1967	See Brazil–Libya relations Lula and Libyan leader Muammar Gaddafi, 2009: Brazil is accredited to Libya from its embassy in Tunis, Tunisia.; Libya has an embassy in Brasília.; Brazil, as a non-permanent member of the UN Security Council, abstained from the vote authorising "all necessary measures" against Libya’s Muammar Gaddafi.; Brazil opposed the bombing in Libya to implement United Nations Security Council Resolution 1973. Brazil president Lula said: "These invasions only happen because the United Nations is weak."
Canada	26 October 1968	See Canada–Libya relations: Canada is accredited to Libya from its embassy in Tunis, Tunisia.; Libya has an embassy in Ottawa.
Chile	20 May 1971	See Chile–Libya relations: Chile is accredited to Libya from its embassy in Cairo, Egypt.; Libya has an embassy in Santiago.
Costa Rica	30 November 1974	See Costa Rica–Libya relations
Cuba	1 March 1976	See Cuba–Libya relations
Grenada	24 July 2000	See Grenada–Libya relations
Haiti	18 January 1979	See Haiti–Libya relations
Mexico	6 August 1975	See Libya–Mexico relations: Libya has an embassy in Mexico City.; Mexico is accredited to Libya from its embassy in Algiers, Algeria.
Nicaragua	19 May 1981	See Libya–Nicaragua relations
Peru	28 April 1974	See Libya–Peru relations: Libya is accredited to Peru from its embassy in Brasília, Brazil.; Peru is accredited to Libya from its embassy in Algiers, Algeria.
Suriname	17 May 1976	See Libya–Suriname relations
United States	24 December 1951	See Libya–United States relations Both countries established diplomatic relations on 24 December 1951. U.S. Defence Secretary Leon Panetta and Transitional Libyan Prime Minister Abdurrahim El-Keib, conduct a press conference in Tripoli, Libya on Dec. 17, 2011. The United States was a major ally of the NTC during the war against Gaddafi, launching Operation Odyssey Dawn on 19 March 2011 after Susan Rice, its ambassador to the UN, successfully persuaded sceptics of the proposed Libyan no-fly zone on the United Nations Security Council to abstain from voting on the resolution rather than voting "no" or exercising veto power. The United States Air Force, Marine Corps, and Navy played an instrumental role in suppressing Libyan air defences in late March before shifting toward a supporting role in Operation Unified Protector. The US took longer than other leading NTC allies to formally recognise the council as Libya's legitimate authority, but it ultimately handed over the Libyan Embassy in Washington, D.C., to the NTC in early August 2011. Later that month, the US led an effort at the United Nations to repeal parts of United Nations Security Council Resolution 1970 in order to allow unfrozen Libyan assets to be transferred to the interim government.
Venezuela	18 June 1965	See Libya–Venezuela relations

=== Asia ===
Country	Formal Relations Began	Notes
Azerbaijan	16 March 1992	See Azerbaijan–Libya relations
Bangladesh	14 December 1974	See Bangladesh–Libya relations
China	9 August 1978	See China–Libya relations China initially did not support the Libyan uprising, instead urging Muammar Gaddafi's government to work quickly to "restore social stability and normalcy". However, as the conflict dragged on, PRC officials began to meet with their NTC counterparts, inviting Mahmoud Jibril to Beijing in late June 2011 for bilateral talks. The PRC opposed the 2011 military intervention in Libya throughout the civil war, accusing the West of using force in an attempt to bring Libya into its sphere of influence and seeking to counter by gradually giving more diplomatic standing to the NTC, culminating in full diplomatic recognition in mid-September 2011, which Beijing's state news agency Xinhua defended as "a mature decision made at the right time". Both governments expressed desire for Chinese participation in rebuilding the country and resuming suspended construction projects. However, relations between the NTC and the PRC were shaken by reports that state-controlled weapons manufacturers in Mainland China met with a high-level delegation from the Gaddafi government in July 2011 in defiance of United Nations Security Council Resolution 1970. The PRC claimed ignorance of the meeting, which several NTC officials openly questioned.
India	20 July 1952	See India–Libya relations
Indonesia	17 October 1991	See Indonesia–Libya relations On 3 September 2011, Indonesian Foreign Affairs Minister Marty Natalegawa said his government supported the NTC "in carrying out the peaceful transition towards democracy". However, he stopped short of expressing Indonesian recognition of the NTC as the country's legitimate authority, and at the United Nations General Assembly vote on accrediting the representative of Libya designated by the council on 16 September, Indonesia abstained. Indonesian energy firm MedcoEnergi reopened its Tripoli office in mid-September 2011 and said later in the month that it would resume oil exploration and production in the Area-47 block of the Libyan oilfields in October 2011. Medco President-Director Lukman Mahfoedz said that under the terms of a new contract between Libya's provisional government and the company, Tripoli would subsidise half the cost of Medco's operations in the Ghadames Basin, while the remaining 50 percent of costs would be split between Medco and the Libyan Investment Authority, one of the corporation's largest shareholders.
Iran	30 December 1967	See Iran–Libya relations
Iraq	21 May 1955	See Iraq–Libya relations Both countries established diplomatic relations on 21 May 1955 when Mr. Abdul Munim Gailani, Envoy Extraordinary and minister Plenipotentiary of Iraq to Libya presented his letters of credence.
Israel		See Israel–Libya relations Israeli minister Ayoob Kara conducted informal relations with the Gaddafi regime, using the Freedom Party of Austria as an intermediary. During the negotiations, Saif al-Islam Gaddafi pledged to assist in securing the release of Gilad Shalit from Hamas, sign a peace treaty with Israel and personally visit Israel in return for Israel lobbying NATO to cease airstrikes on Libya. However, talks ended when rebel forces took control of Tripoli. Democratic Party of Libya figure Ahmad Shabani said on 23 August that the Libyan opposition wanted the support of the international community, including Israel, despite the state's current lack of diplomatic relations with Libya. When asked if a democratically elected Libyan government would recognise Israel, Shabani responded, "The question is whether Israel will recognize us." He said his party supports a two-state solution for Israel and Palestine. The DPL is not an official organ of the NTC, but it supports the council's transitional role. On 16 September 2011, Israel voted in the United Nations General Assembly to accredit the NTC as Libya's legal representative.
Japan	2 June 1957	See Japan–Libya relations
Jordan	30 August 1961	See Jordan–Libya relations
Kazakhstan	13 March 1992	See Kazakhstan–Libya relations
North Korea	23 January 1974	See Libya–North Korea relations: Libya is accredited to North Korea from its embassy in Seoul, South Korea.; North Korea has an embassy in Tripoli
Pakistan	16 July 1952	See Libya–Pakistan relations
Philippines	17 November 1976	See Libya–Philippines relations: Libya has an embassy in Manila.; Philippines has an embassy in Tripoli
Qatar	19 November 1975	See Libya–Qatar relations Qatar was the second country to recognise the NTC and the first to announce a trade agreement with it, declaring on 27 March 2011 that it would market Libyan oil exports from eastern terminals controlled by anti-Gaddafi elements. It was also the first Arab country to join international military operations in Libya, sending interceptors to help enforce the no-fly zone starting on 25 March. The Qatari government is also closely tied to Al Jazeera, one of the first international news networks to begin covering the 2011 civil war. The NTC faced one of its first diplomatic quandaries after Iman al-Obeidi, a Libyan woman who accused Gaddafi-loyal militiamen of beating and gang-raping her at a checkpoint in a high-profile appearance before journalists at the Rixos Al Nasr in Tripoli, was granted asylum in Qatar. Despite the protests of the United Nations High Commissioner for Refugees, Qatar then forcibly deported Obeidi back to Benghazi on 2 June 2011 for unknown reasons, and Obeidi publicly blamed the NTC for her deportation. Despite this incident, Qatari cooperation with the NTC remained close throughout the war, with close consultations between officials of the two governments in Doha becoming so frequent that some anti-Gaddafi fighters complained that their leadership was spending too much time in Qatar and not enough time in Libya. Qatari military advisers also reportedly accompanied some anti-Gaddafi brigades in the Nafusa Mountains and during the coastal offensive in Tripolitania, even helping to direct some fighters in the storming of Gaddafi's Bab al-Azizia compound in central Tripoli. On 16 October 2011, the Qatari and Libyan governments signed a memorandum of understanding in Doha for cooperation between the justice ministries of the two states. Officials said the fledgling government of Libya could benefit from Qatar's experience in establishing justice, law and order.
South Korea	29 December 1980	See Libya–South Korea relations Establishment of Diplomatic Relations between the Republic of Korea and Libya in December 1980 and in (January 2015) Number of South Koreans living in Libya: 48.
Syria		See Libya–Syria relations President Bashar al-Assad, the Ba'athist Syrian head of state, responded to the Syrian civil war in a manner frequently compared by protesters to Muammar Gaddafi's crackdown in February 2011 and beyond. Syria voted at the United Nations General Assembly to accredit the NTC as representative of Libya on 16 September 2011. However, Assad's government has allowed Al-Rai TV, a Syrian station, to broadcast pro-Gaddafi propaganda since the leader's fall from power, including audio messages from Gaddafi, members of his family, and former Information Minister Moussa Ibrahim. On 10 October 2011, Libya became the first country to recognise the Syrian National Council, an umbrella group of opposition leaders within and outside Syria formed as an alternative to the government in Damascus, as "the sole legitimate government in Syria", according to NTC official Mussa al-Koni, who serves as a representative of the Tuareg of Libya. Koni said the NTC also ordered the Syrian Embassy in Tripoli to be shuttered until further notice. NTC also promised the representatives of SNC to hand them over the embassy of Syria in Tripoli.
Thailand	16 March 1977	See Libya–Thailand relations: Both countries established diplomatic relations on 16 March 1977; Libya has an embassy in Bangkok.; Thailand is accredited to Libya through its embassy in Rome, Italy.
Turkey	30 December 1952	See Libya–Turkey relations: Libya has an embassy in Ankara and a Consulate General in Istanbul.; Turkey has an embassy in Tripoli and a Consulate General in Misurata.; Trade volume between the two countries was 1.865 billion USD in 2018 (Libyan exports/imports: 0.37/1.50 billion USD).; 188,312 Libyan tourists visited Turkey in 2018.; Turkey was a prominent backer of the Libyan opposition during the civil war, although it was initially strongly opposed to the international military intervention and expressed concern about the violence. However, Turkey became a strong advocate for a leading NATO role in Libya by the end of March and joined in operations to enforce an embargo on Gaddafi-held ports. With Turkey's reversal on the international military mission, as well as its decision to recognise the NTC in early July 2011, it gained considerably more influence with the ultimately victorious rebels. It also provided $300 million in aid to the NTC prior to the start of Ramadan, as well several fuel shipments via the Turkish Petroleum International Company. Foreign Minister Ahmet Davutoğlu visited Benghazi in late August, just as Tripoli was being taken by anti-Gaddafi forces. When Prime Minister Recep Tayyip Erdoğan visited Tripoli the following month, he received a rock star welcome from gratified Libyans. The Turkish Air Force also worked with the NTC to airdrop humanitarian aid to Waddan, and the Libyan South near Qatrun in mid-September 2011, delivering at least 14 tons of food to the areas selected by Libyan and Turkish officials. In January 2020, Turkey deployed approximately 2,000 Syrian fighters, including from the Syrian National Army, to Libya in support of Fayez al-Sarraj.
United Arab Emirates	24 May 1972	See Libya–United Arab Emirates relations The UAE maintains a forward operating base at the Al-Khadim Airport, near Marj.
Vietnam	15 March 1975	See Libya–Vietnam relations: Both countries established diplomatic relations on 15 March 1975; Libya has an embassy in Hanoi.; Vietnam is accredited to Libya from its embassy in Cairo, Egypt.
Yemen	22 August 1960	See Libya–Yemen relations

=== Europe ===
Country	Formal Relations Began	Notes
Albania	6 May 1970	See Albania–Libya relations
Belarus	30 August 1996	See Belarus–Libya relations
Croatia	30 March 2000	See Croatia–Libya relations
Cyprus	8 November 1973	See Cyprus–Libya relations Relations between Cyprus and Libya have always remained strong especially due to the relations of the President of the Cyprus House of Representatives Yiannakis Omirou with Libyan politicians. Libya was a key investor to Cyprus after the invasion of the island by Turkey and was a source of jobs for Cypriots working under the Cypriot multinational company Joannou & Paraskevaides. The latest state visit between the two countries was of Cypriot Foreign Minister Erato Kozakou-Marcoullis to Tripoli in 2011 after the overthrow of the Gaddafi regime.
Czech Republic	16 May 1960	See Czech Republic–Libya relations Relations between Libya and the Czech Republic was relatively slow, among European Union member states, to establish full diplomatic relations with the NTC. Meetings between Czech and Libyan officials of the NTC began in mid-June 2011, and by the end of the month, Foreign Minister Karel Schwarzenberg was quoted as saying, while visiting Benghazi to deliver a shipment of medical supplies, that the Czech Republic recognised the NTC as the legitimate representative of the Libyan people. However, Schwarzenberg later clarified that he had not expressed his government's recognition of the NTC as a legitimate government, a position he maintained until the end of the Battle of Tripoli. On 21 September 2011, the Czech Republic joined the Friends of Libya Conference, a group of countries and international organisations committed to helping rebuild a democratic, internationalist Libya.
France	1 January 1952	See France–Libya relations France was the first country to recognise the NTC as Libya's sole legitimate representative, doing so on 10 March 2011. Just over a week later, France co-sponsored United Nations Security Council Resolution 1973, and the French Air Force was the first military coalition component to engage Gaddafi-loyal forces on the ground in Libya, intervening to turn the tide at the Second Battle of Benghazi on 19 March by destroying advancing columns of Libyan Army tanks, armoured personnel carriers, and artillery pieces. In late August 2011, France unblocked 20 percent of frozen Libyan assets held in the country. President Nicolas Sarkozy visited Tripoli on 15 September, becoming (together with British Prime Minister David Cameron) one of the first world leaders to make a state visit to Libya since the conquest of the capital.
Germany	3 June 1955	See Germany–Libya relations
Greece	1952	See Greece–Libya relations Diplomatic relations between Greece and Libya date back to 1952, when Libya's independence was formally recognized by the United Nations. Relations between the two countries had been traditionally friendly, especially during the 1980s and 1990s, when the personal friendship between Muammar Gaddafi and Greek socialist Prime Minister Andreas Papandreou contributed to close ties between the two countries. Greece provided continued military training in its military academies to future Libyan career officers, well into the early 2000s. Due to the Libyan Civil War, in 2014 Greece closed its embassy in Tripoli, while Libya continued to be represented in Greece through its embassy in Athens. The signing in 2019 of the Libya (GNA)–Turkey maritime deal fuelled Greece’s strong reaction and condemnation, also followed by concerns raised for its legality by other countries in the region, the international community and political powers within Libya itself, including the rival Tobruk-based government led by Libya's Parliament (House of Representatives) and the Libyan National Army. Greece regarded it as "void" and "geographically absurd", because it ignored the presence of the Greek islands of Crete, Kasos, Karpathos, Kastellorizo and Rhodes between the Turkish–Libyan coasts. This subsequently led to the expulsion of the Libyan ambassador from Greece and deterioration of relations between Greece and the GNA. Following political change at the head of Government in Libya in 2021, and in an effort to stabilise relations and increase Greece’s diplomatic presence in the country, the reopening of the Greek Embassy in Tripoli and a new Consulate General in Benghazi were announced by the Greek Ministry of Foreign Affairs. During the COVID-19 pandemic, Greece donated 200,000 vaccines to Libya.
Italy	21 February 1952	See Italy–Libya relations Both countries established diplomatic relations on 21 February 1952 when has been accredited first Envoy Extraordinary and Minister Plenipotentiary of Italy to Libya Mr. Mario Conti. Libya's largest international trade partner, Rome's decision to reject Gaddafi as a negotiating party and recognise the NTC in early April 2011 was seen as a major diplomatic coup for NTC envoy Mahmoud Jibril. Although Italy joined international military efforts to weaken Gaddafi's grip on the country, granting the use of military bases in Italian territory and participating in Operation Unified Protector, Foreign Minister Franco Frattini called for an "immediate cessation of hostilities" in June 2011 to allow for the delivery of humanitarian aid, a suggestion that NATO ignored. In late August 2011, Frattini vowed that Italian oil company Eni would "play a number one role in the future" in Libya and resume oil production as soon as Libya's oilfields reopened for business. Prime Minister Silvio Berlusconi also announced the release of $505 million in frozen Libyan assets as a "first payment" to Libya's new government as its forces battled to secure Tripoli. Abdulrahman Ben Yezza, a former Eni executive, was named oil minister in the caretaker government of Prime Minister Abdurrahim El-Keib on 22 November.
Kosovo	14 May 2014	See Kosovo–Libya relations Both countries established diplomatic relations on 14 May 2014. Kosovo declared independence on 17 February 2008. Libya under Gaddafi was opposed to Kosovo's independence and refused to recognise Kosovo as independent. However, after the fall of Gaddafi in 2011, Libya officially recognised Kosovo as an independent state on 25 September 2013.
Lithuania	11 June 2008	See Libya–Lithuania relations
Malta	15 June 1965	See Libya–Malta relations On 21 February 2011, days before the establishment of the NTC in Benghazi, two Libyan Air Force fighter jets defected to Malta rather than bomb the restive eastern cities. The Maltese government's refusal to extradite the pilots or return the aircraft to Libya swiftly established the island state as an unfriendly neighbour of the Gaddafi government amidst the Libyan uprising. After the fall of Tripoli to anti-Gaddafi forces in late August 2011, Maltese Foreign Affairs Minister Tonio Borg announced on 10 September that Malta would become the first EU country to reopen its embassy in the Libyan capital. The following day, Libyan Finance Minister Ali Tarhouni commissioned an investigation into companies with joint Libyan and Maltese shareholding, with the intent of locating businessmen both in Libya and in Malta who had assisted the Gaddafi government during the war, such as by facilitating the importation of oil to Gaddafi-loyal ports in defiance of the UN embargo. A spokesman for Tarhouni's office said that "all honest businessmen have no need to worry" and indicated the probe was not a critique of the Maltese government.
Northern Cyprus		Despite the fact that Libya has not officially recognised the Northern Cyprus, on 30 October 2011, Libyan Health Minister Abdal Rahman Ali al-Kissa signed a protocol with his Northern Cypriot counterpart to reserve 250 beds at the Near East University hospital in northern North Nicosia for the treatment of injured Libyans. He also met with TRNC Prime Minister İrsen Küçük.
Norway	20 July 1966	See Libya–Norway relations
Poland	2 December 1963	See Libya–Poland relations Poland at the mid 2000s like the rest of West countries started to turn its eyes back on Libya after almost 20 years of absence. At the beginning of the civil war, the Polish government was not eager to participate in any military action in Libya, but called the other members of NATO and European Union to use other ways, but prime minister Donald Tusk assured that Poland would take part in some "community activities." At the same time, Polish NGOs started the preparations to help eastern Libya. The position of government concern Libya has not changed with the beginning of Military intervention in Libya. The diplomatic relations with NTC were established during the visit of Polish FM Radosław Sikorski to Benghazi on 11 May, when he announced the recognition of the NTC as "rightful interlocutor for the international community (...) in Libya" Poland was the only country that opened its embassy in Benghazi. On 8 July, the Minister noticed the Polish recognition of NTC as the "legitimate government of the Libyan people". Poland was also member of Libya Contact Group, where it offered to launch humanitarian help and training for state officials and new law and order services. There are unofficial reports that Poland was sending weapons and officers of Polish Special Forces. Ahmed El-Mallul, a Libyan surgeon in Poland, was a mediator between the NTC and the Polish government. On 15 September Poland reopened its embassy in Tripoli and started to prepare ground for humanitarian help, which arrived on 3 October in Misrata Also Libyan representatives were in Poland at the parliamentary elections on 6–11 October 2011. Next visit of foreign minister took place on 24 October in Tripoli. Three days later Libyan decedents decided to strengthen bilateral relations and notify Polish MFA about upgrading its Economic Cooperation Bureau in Warsaw to the rank of Embassy and establish a joint Libyan-Polish commission headed by its Ministers of Foreign Affairs.
Portugal	1975	See Libya–Portugal relations
Romania	14 February 1974	See Libya–Romania relations
Russia	4 September 1955	See Libya–Russia relations Russia sharply criticised the NATO-led military intervention in the Libyan civil war, though it chose not to use its veto power on the United Nations Security Council to block it. On 27 May 2011, Russian President Dmitri Medvedev said that although Moscow opposed the military operations, it believed Gaddafi should leave power. In early June 2011, Russian envoy Mikhail Margelov was received in Benghazi, the de facto headquarters of the Libyan opposition. Margelov's stated objective was to broker a truce between anti-Gaddafi forces and the Gaddafi-led government. He left Benghazi with an invitation from the NTC for Russia to open a representative office in the city, though it opted not to do so before recognising the council as Libya's sole legitimate representative, which it did on 1 September 2011.
Serbia	2 October 1955	See Libya–Serbia relations
Ukraine	17 March 1992	See Libya–Ukraine relations Both countries established diplomatic relations on 17 March 1992.
United Kingdom	24 December 1951	See Libya–United Kingdom relations Libya established diplomatic relations with the United Kingdom on 24 December 1951.: Libya maintains an embassy in London.; The United Kingdom is accredited to Libya through its embassy in Tripoli.; The UK administered Libya from 1942 to 1951, when Libya gained full independence. Bilaterally the two countries have a Double Taxation Agreement, and have signed an Investment Agreement. The United Kingdom co-sponsored UNSCR 1973 and was one of the largest contributors to Operation Unified Protector, the NATO-led intervention to degrade the military strength of Muammar Gaddafi's forces, though it carried out considerably fewer strike missions than fellow coalition partners France and the United States. In early September 2011, the Royal Air Force flew crateloads of unfrozen Libyan funds in the form of dinar banknotes to Benghazi, the location of the NTC's interim central bank. On 15 September, Prime Minister David Cameron visited Tripoli together with French President Sarkozy to meet with leaders of the NTC.

=== Oceania ===
Country	Formal Relations Began	Notes
Australia	4 January 1978	See Australia–Libya relations Both countries established diplomatic relations on 4 January 1978. Australia was a major non-military backer of the revolutionaries during the Libyan Civil War, sending more humanitarian aid to Libya than any other single country after the United States. It was relatively early to recognise the NTC, doing so on 9 June 2011, months before the capture of Tripoli. In December 2011, Australian Foreign Affairs Minister Kevin Rudd traveled to Libya to meet with Libyan Prime Minister Abdurrahim El-Keib. Rudd ceremonially hoisted the flag of Australia at his country's consul-general in Tripoli and pledged Canberra's support for efforts to remove unexploded landmines in Libya, as well as advice on Libya's planned transition to democratic governance.
New Zealand	4 May 1983	Both countries established diplomatic relations on 4 May 1983 when first Secretary (Ambassador) of the People's Bureau (Embassy) of the Socialist People's Libyan Arab Jamahiriya (resident in Canberra), presented his credentials to the Governor-General New Zealand
Vanuatu	29 May 1986	See Libya–Vanuatu relations Both countries established diplomatic relations on 29 May 1986

== International response ==
Libya Countries that have recognised the National Transitional Council as the sole legitimate representative of Libya Countries with informal relations with the NTC, or which voted in favour of it assuming Libya's UN seat, but have not established formal recognition Countries which opposed the NTC assuming Libya's UN seat, yet have not made a formal statement on recognition Countries which have formally opposed the NTC

During the Libyan Civil War, at least 100 countries and numerous international organisations, including the United Nations, expressly recognised the NTC as Libya's legitimate authority or used similar language. Several other countries have recognised the NTC as the interim government of Libya since the war's end.

== Membership in intergovernmental organisations ==
Libya was suspended from Arab League proceedings in late February 2011 over the bombardment of civilians by Gaddafi's forces during widespread protests against his government. In early June, Vice Chairman Abdul Hafiz Ghoga, a frequent spokesman for the council, emphasised his government's intention to reintegrate Libya into the Arab world. It was reinstated on 27 August with the NTC as its representative.

The African Union's Peace and Security Council decided on 26 August 2011 to call for a national unity government including the remnants of the Gaddafi government as well as members of the NTC instead of transferring its diplomatic recognition to the NTC as Libya's legal representative. After Chairman Mustafa Abdul Jalil pledged the council's commitment to protecting human rights, shepherding Libya through the process of postwar reconciliation, and transitioning to full democracy at a Libya Contact Group conference in Paris on 1 September, a spokesman for the African Union Commission said the commission was "reassured" and would bring the issue of recognition up for discussion again. Relations between the AU and the NTC have been strained by persistent reports of hate crimes, including arbitrary detentions and lynchings, being perpetrated against black people in Tawergha, Tripoli, and other places in Libya. On 20 September 2011, the African Union officially recognised the National Transitional Council as the legitimate representative of Libya.

The NTC asked to take up Libya's seat at the United Nations. The UN was also a member of the Libya Contact Group. Secretary-General Ban Ki-moon, the UN's nominal leader, said on 1 September that the UN would work with "Libyan authority" to help Libya transition toward democracy. Ban also backed a proposed United Nations Security Council resolution to codify the international body's role in supporting Libyan democracy and stability. Although the NTC welcomed United Nations Security Council Resolution 1973, which authorised the NATO-led bombing of Libyan military targets, it has rejected proposals for a United Nations peacekeeping contingent in postwar Libya, saying it wants no foreign troops deployed on Libyan soil. The United Nations General Assembly, with 114 member states in favor to 17 opposed, voted on 16 September 2011 to recognise the NTC as holding Libya's seat at the United Nations.

== NTC appointed representatives during the civil war ==
The National Transitional Council had opened representative missions abroad during the civil war. Several countries had recognised the council as the sole "governing authority" in Libya and some of these countries invited the council to appoint diplomatic envoys and to take over Libyan embassies in their capitals. A number of embassies and diplomatic offices in other countries have declared allegiance to the council unilaterally, but it is unclear whether they are in communication with it.

Representative missions of the NTC during the civil war:

- Bulgaria
  - Sofia – Isse Rabii Anshour (ambassador)
- Canada
  - Ottawa – Abubaker Karmos (interim chargé d'affaires)
- Denmark
  - Copenhagen – Ibrahim Grada (representative of NTC in Denmark)
- European Union
  - Brussels – Mohamed Farhat (ambassador)
- France
  - Paris – Mansour Seif Al-Nasr (special envoy)
- Italy
  - Rome – Hafed Gaddur (ambassador)
- Panama
  - Panama – Nagi Ahmed Ksuda (interim chargé d'affaires)
- South Korea
  - Seoul – Otman S. Saad AHBARA (ambassador)
- Switzerland
  - Bern – Sliman Bouchuiguir (ambassador)
- United Arab Emirates
  - Abu Dhabi – Dr Aref Ali Nayed (ambassador)
- United Kingdom
  - London – Mahmud al-Naku (chargé d'affaires)
- United States
  - Washington, D.C. – Ali Aujali (ambassador)
- United Nations
  - New York City – Abdel Rahman Shalgham (special representative)

== See also ==
- List of ministers of foreign affairs of Libya
- List of diplomatic missions in Libya
- List of diplomatic missions of Libya
- Libyan Civil War
- 2011 military intervention in Libya
- Arab Spring
- Foreign relations of Libya under Gaddafi
- International reactions to the 2011 Libyan civil war
- Libya Contact Group
- London Conference on Libya
- National Transitional Council
