= Japan–Libya relations =

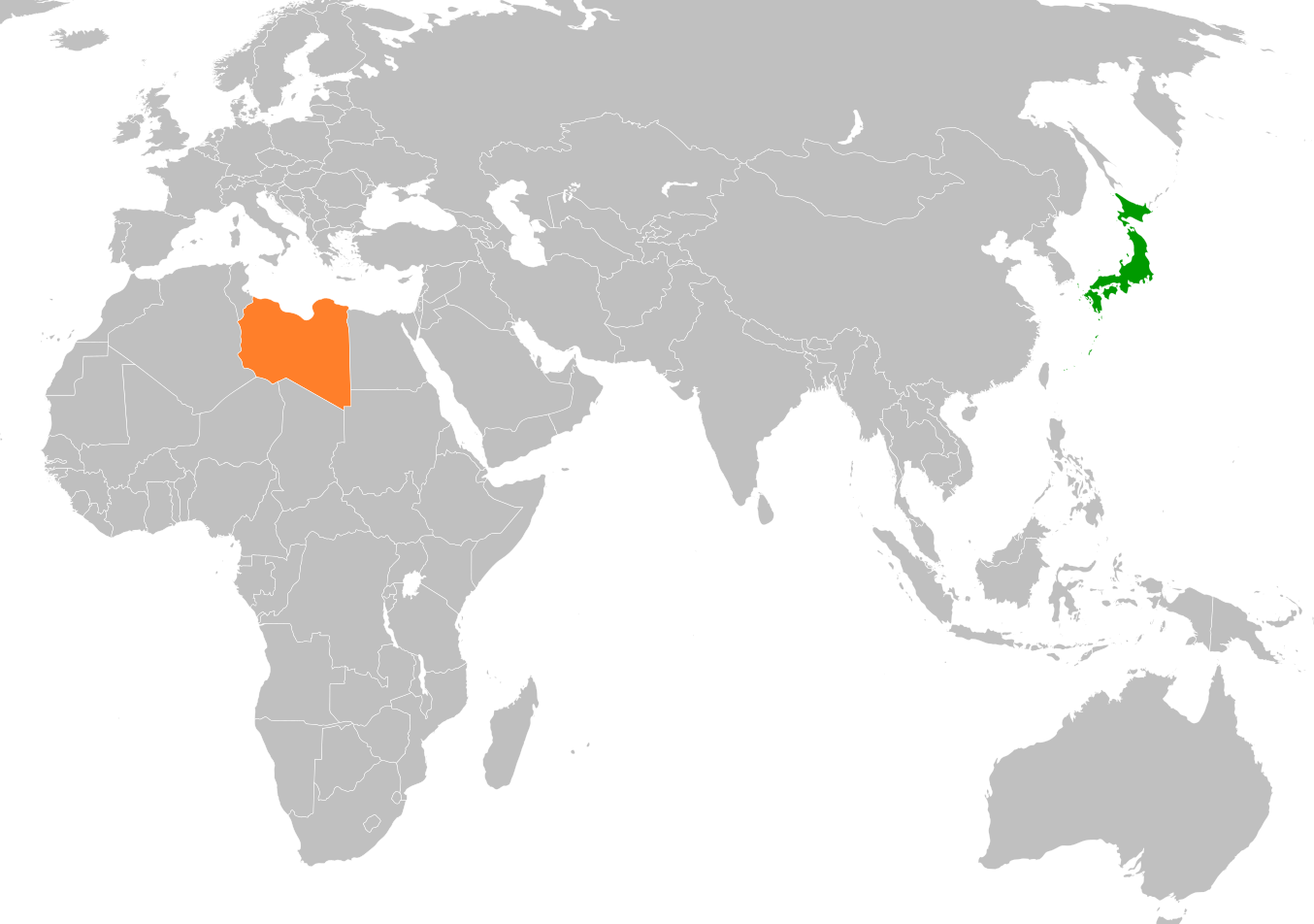

- Japan: Libya

Japan–Libya relations are the bilateral relations between Japan and Libya. Japan has an embassy in Tripoli, and Libya has an embassy in Tokyo.

== History ==
=== Diplomatic history ===
In 1957, Japan established diplomatic relations with the Kingdom of Libya. In 1973, the Embassy of Japan in Libya opened in Tripoli. In 2011, the Japanese embassy in Libya was forced to temporarily close due to the Libyan civil war, but resumed operations after the Libyan National Council took over the government. However, in 2014, civil war broke out again (2014 Libyan Civil War), and the embassy was evacuated to Cairo in July of the same year. In March 2018, the embassy moved from Cairo to Tunis. It reopened in 2023.

Meanwhile, the Libyan side opened the Libyan Embassy in Japan in August 1971. In January 1980, the name was changed to the People's Office due to the transition to the Jamahiriya regime (direct democracy with socialist elements), but in September 2011, after the end of the Gaddafi regime, the Libyan Embassy was renamed. The name has changed back to.

=== Libyan Civil War ===
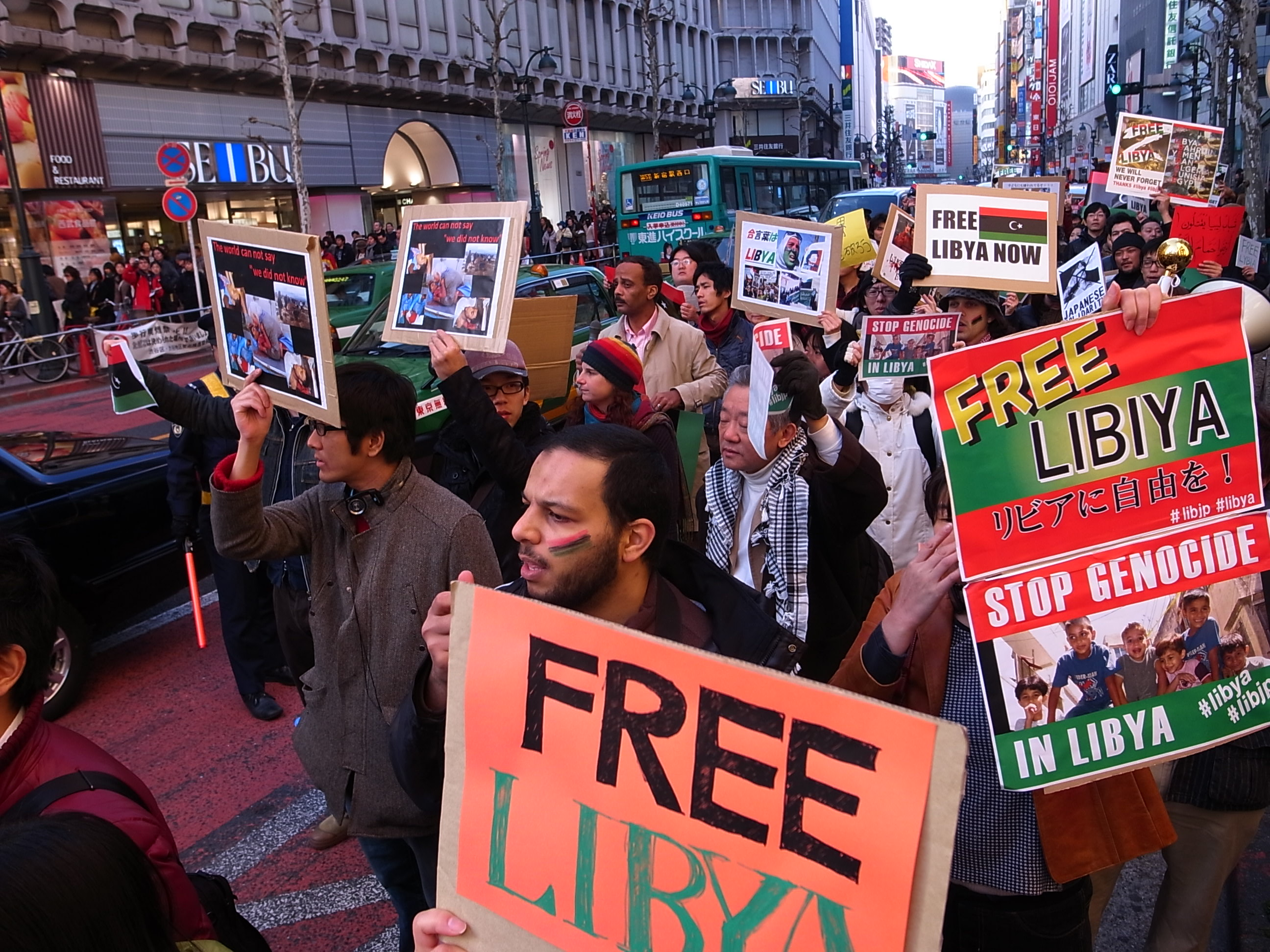
Libyans living in Japan and pro-democracy Japanese people hold an anti-Gaddafi demonstration in Shibuya, Tokyo. It carries the national flag of the monarchy. Photographed on February 26, 2011

In 2015, through consultations between the Libyan National House of Representatives and the new National Assembly, it was agreed to establish a unity government with Fayez Sarraj as the new prime minister. However, in opposition to this, the Egyptian-backed Libyan National Army and the Turkish-backed National Salvation Government established independent forces, and the civil war continued. The Japanese government condemns the use of force by the two forces mentioned above. Additionally, for the first time in approximately seven years, Japan has added economic sanctions such as asset freezes.

In this way, Japan is closely monitoring the situation in Libya and continues to consistently support the democratic forces (Libyan National Council, Libyan National Council of Representatives, and Government of National Unity).

=== Diplomatic visits ===
The political situation in Libya is not stable due to the ongoing conflict, and the diplomatic visits to Libya are not feasible. The last visit by a Japanese dignitary to Libya was in 2012, when Deputy Foreign Minister Ryuji Yamane visited Libya.

Meanwhile, Libyan dignitaries continue to visit Japan to attend the African Development Conference. In August 2019, Mohammad Al-Taher Shayara, the Foreign Minister of the Libyan Government of National Unity, visited Japan. He attended the African Development Conference and held a foreign minister's meeting with Taro Kono. Prior to that, the two sides held a foreign ministers' meeting in Egypt, and Japan stated that Libya is indispensable for building stability in the Middle East.

== Economic exchange ==
Although Libya was one of the richest countries in Africa, it was added to the list of countries eligible for ODA following the revision of the DAC list in December 2005, and technical cooperation was provided until 2014, when the unstable situation in Libya resulted to its suspension. Since 2018, it has been decided to accept international students through the ABE Initiative. Furthermore, since the civil war in 2011, assistance via international organizations has been provided continuously, except in 2014–2015. In 2018, economic recovery and food assistance was provided through the United Nations Development Program (US$2.41 million) and the United Nations World Food Program (US$800,000).

In 2018, Libya's trade with Japan was 1.509 billion yen in exports and 3.537 billion yen in imports, which was a surplus for Japan. Partly due to the impact of economic sanctions resulting from the civil war, the scale of trade between the two countries is small compared to the size of their economies.

Before the civil war, the Japan Oil, Gas and Metals National Corporation (JOGMEC) and Libya's national oil company NOC were implementing technical cooperation in the oil and natural gas field, but this is currently frozen. Five Japanese companies, including Nippon Oil, INPEX Holdings, and Petroleum Exploration, were negotiating to build an oil refinery in Libya, but these were also halted due to the civil war.

== Cultural exchange ==
Since the civil war in 2011, there have been no cultural exchanges or projects at the government level. In Japan, the ``Japan-Libya Friendship Association was established and continued its activities to promote cultural exchange between the two countries even under UN sanctions. The chairwoman is Yuriko Koike.

In 2007, the 36th Tripoli International Fair was held in Tripoli. A Japan pavilion was also opened, with 12 Japanese companies participating. It was a great success with 280,000 visitors.

== Resident diplomatic missions ==
- Libya has an embassy in Tokyo.
- Japan has an embassy in Tripoli.
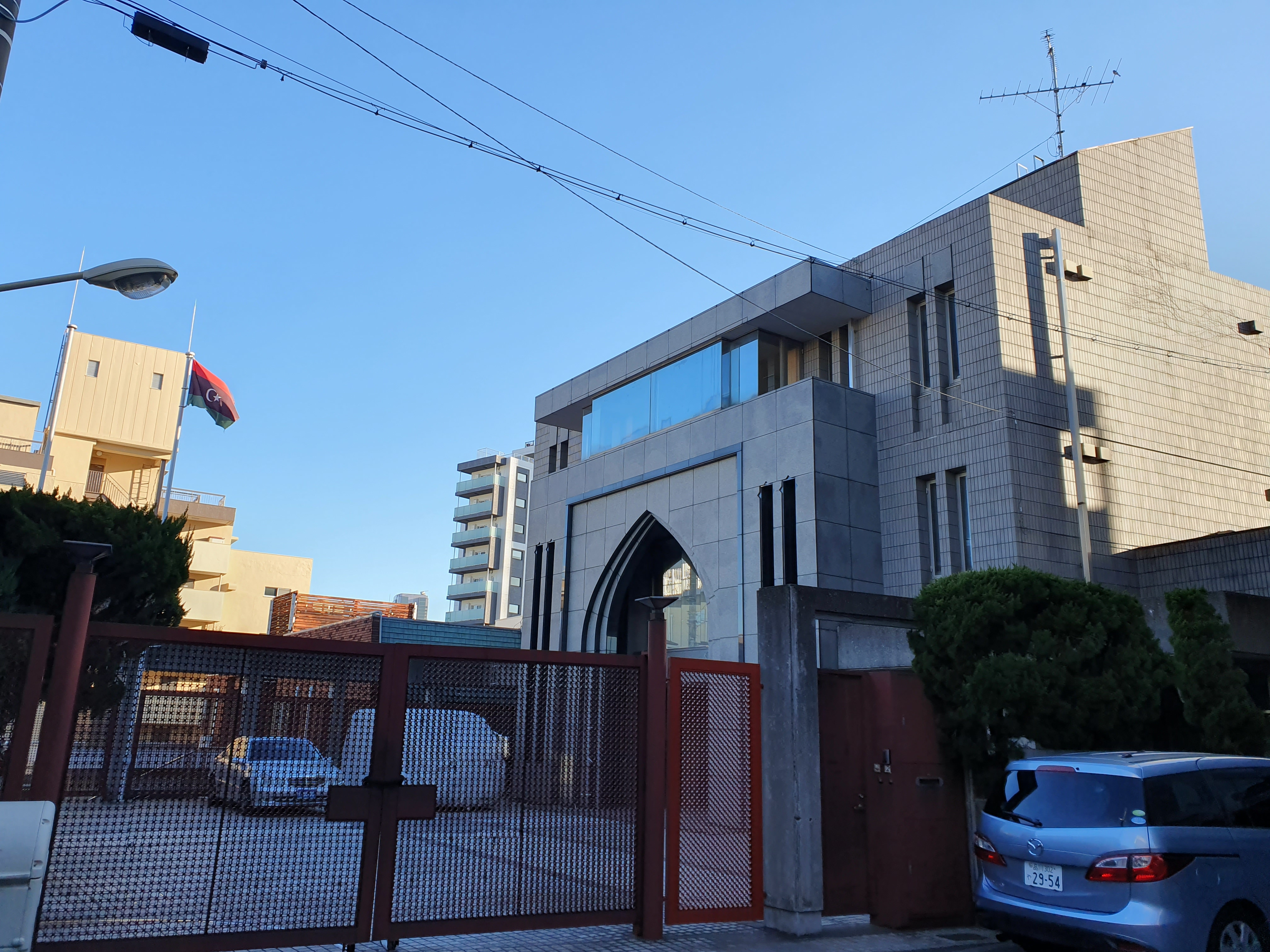
Embassy of Libya in Tokyo

== See also ==
- Foreign relations of Japan
  - List of diplomatic missions in Japan
  - List of diplomatic missions of Japan
- Foreign relations of Libya
  - List of diplomatic missions of Libya
  - List of diplomatic missions in Libya
