= Libya–Romania relations =

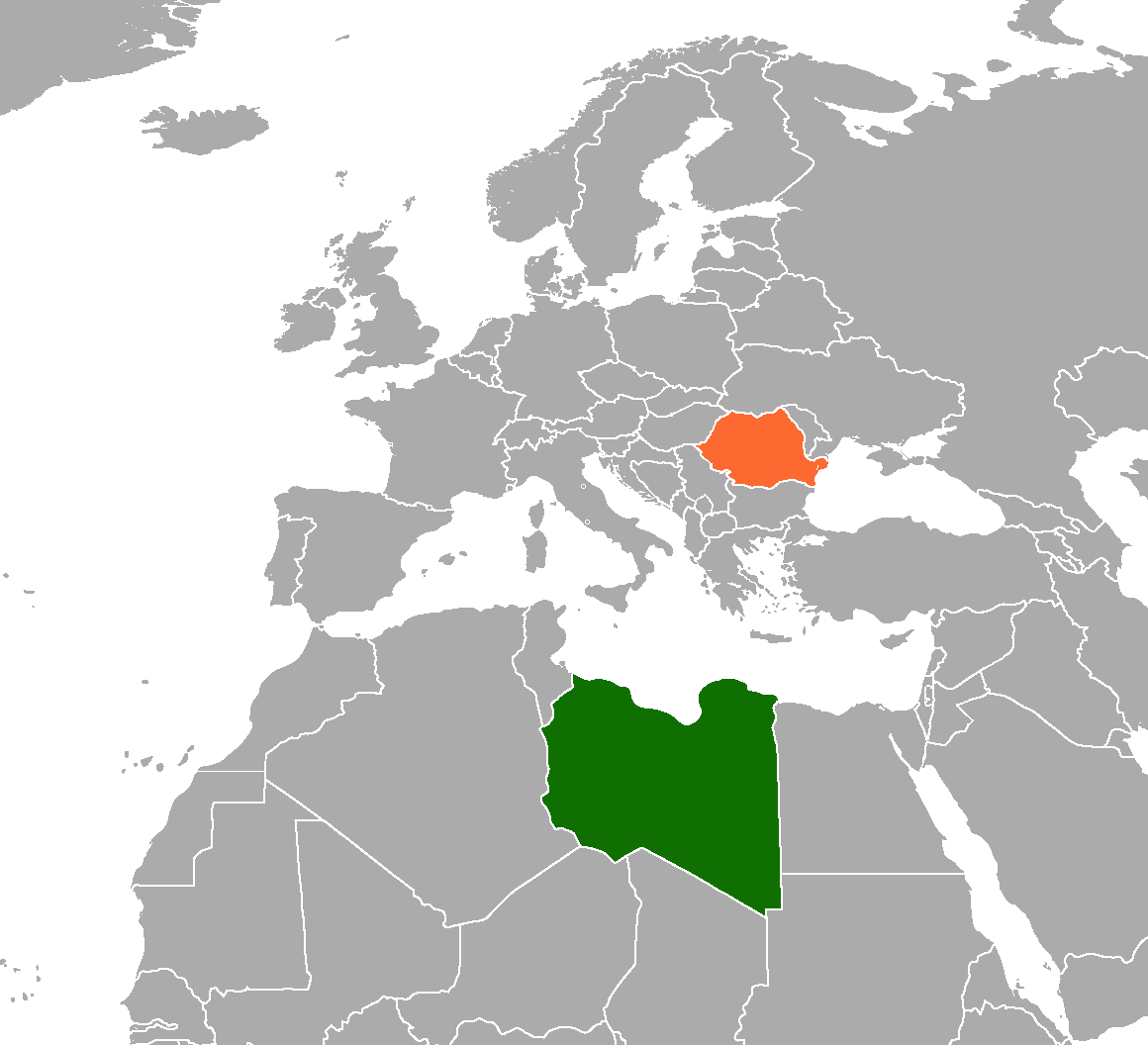

- Libya: Romania

Libya–Romania relations refer to bilateral relations between Libya and Romania. Both countries are members of the United Nations.

== History ==
Diplomatic relations between the two countries were established on February 14, 1974. In the summer of 1973, Major Abdessalam Jalloud, the second statesman of Libya, made a stopover in Romania, while returning from Moscow. He was received by Nicolae Ceaușescu, with whom he spoke for over six hours. Their discussion focused on their differences of opinion between the two on the subject of Israel. At the time of the meeting, Romania was the only communist bloc country that maintained diplomatic relations with the Jewish state. Major Jalloud had come with a directive from Muammar Gaddafi to try to convince Ceaușescu to break relations with Israel, while reproaching the Romanian leader for his initiative to facilitate direct Arab-Israeli peace negotiations. Failing to wring any concession from Ceaușescu, Abdessalam Jalloud omitted to invite him to visit Libya.

Ceaușescu finally visited Libya from February 12-14, 1974. Received warmly and managing to overcome their disagreements, a mutual sympathy was established between the two leaders, reflected in the establishment of diplomatic relations between the two countries and by signing economic, scientific and technical cooperation agreements.

=== Relations ===
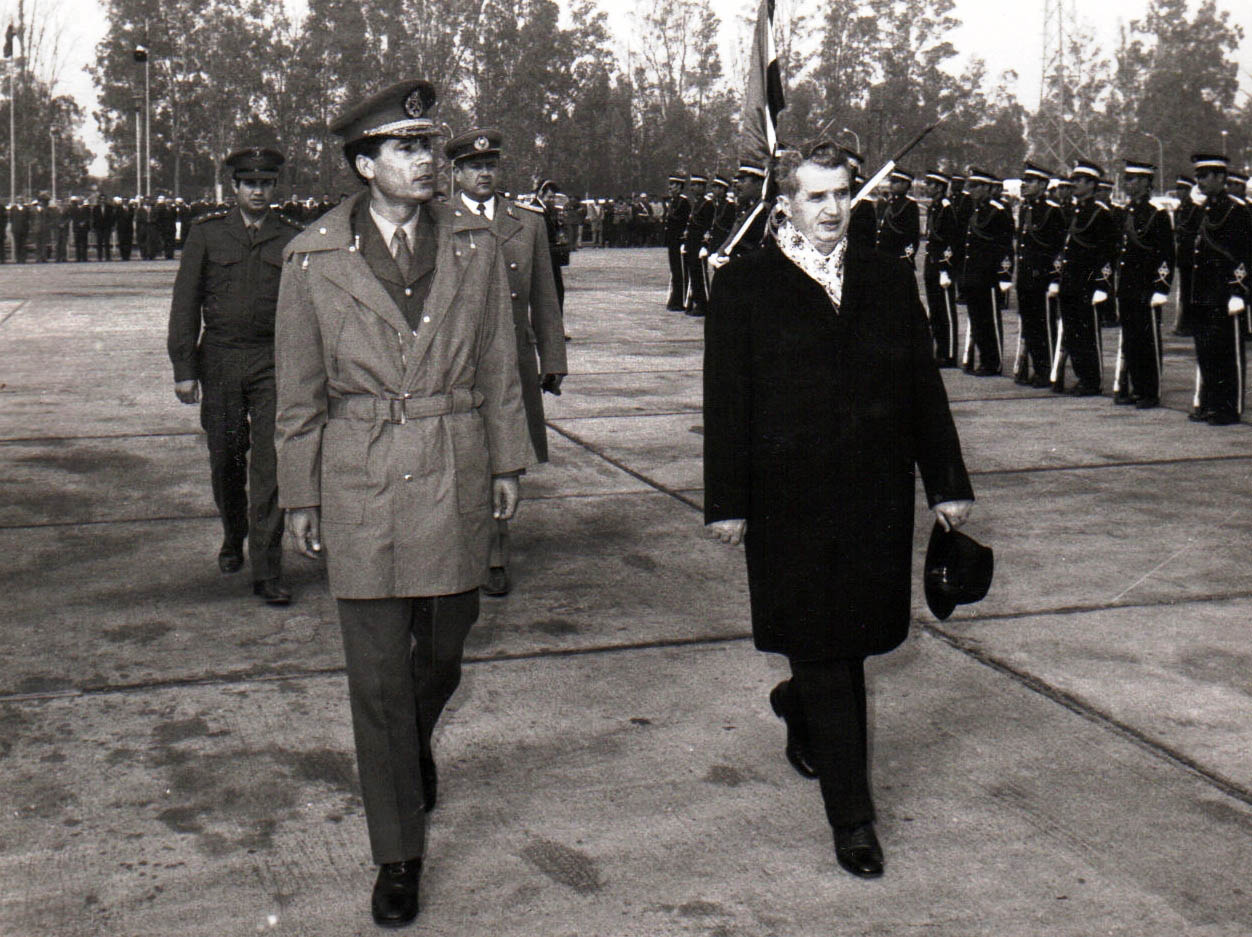
Libyan Leader Muammar Gaddafi with Romanian President Nicolae Ceaușescu in Bucharest, 1974

Through the agreement with Libya, Romania was one of the few states that sheltered from the 1973 oil crisis. More than a million tons of oil imported by Romania in 1974 came from Libya. In the period 1974–1980, the economic exchanges between the two states exploded, exceeded one billion dollars.

In Red Horizons, Mihai Pacepa narrated an episode that represents the beginning of the Ceaușescu-Gaddafi friendship: on the second day of the 1974 visit, Ceaușescu opened a large silver box in front of Gaddafi. Inside was an old handwritten book.

Ceausescu allegedly told Gaddafi: "This is the original manuscript of the first Romanian translation of the Koran, made hundreds of years ago. We only have one copy, but I also have only one true brother. Keep it, brother!"

Visibly moved, Gaddafi allegedly replied: "My brother! You are my brother for the rest of my life!", and hugged him tightly. According to Pacepa, the scene had been carefully staged.

== Resident diplomatic missions ==
- Libya has an embassy in Bucharest.
- Romania is accredited to Libya from its embassy in Cairo.

== See also ==
- Foreign relations of Libya
- Foreign relations of Romania
