= Belarus–Libya relations =

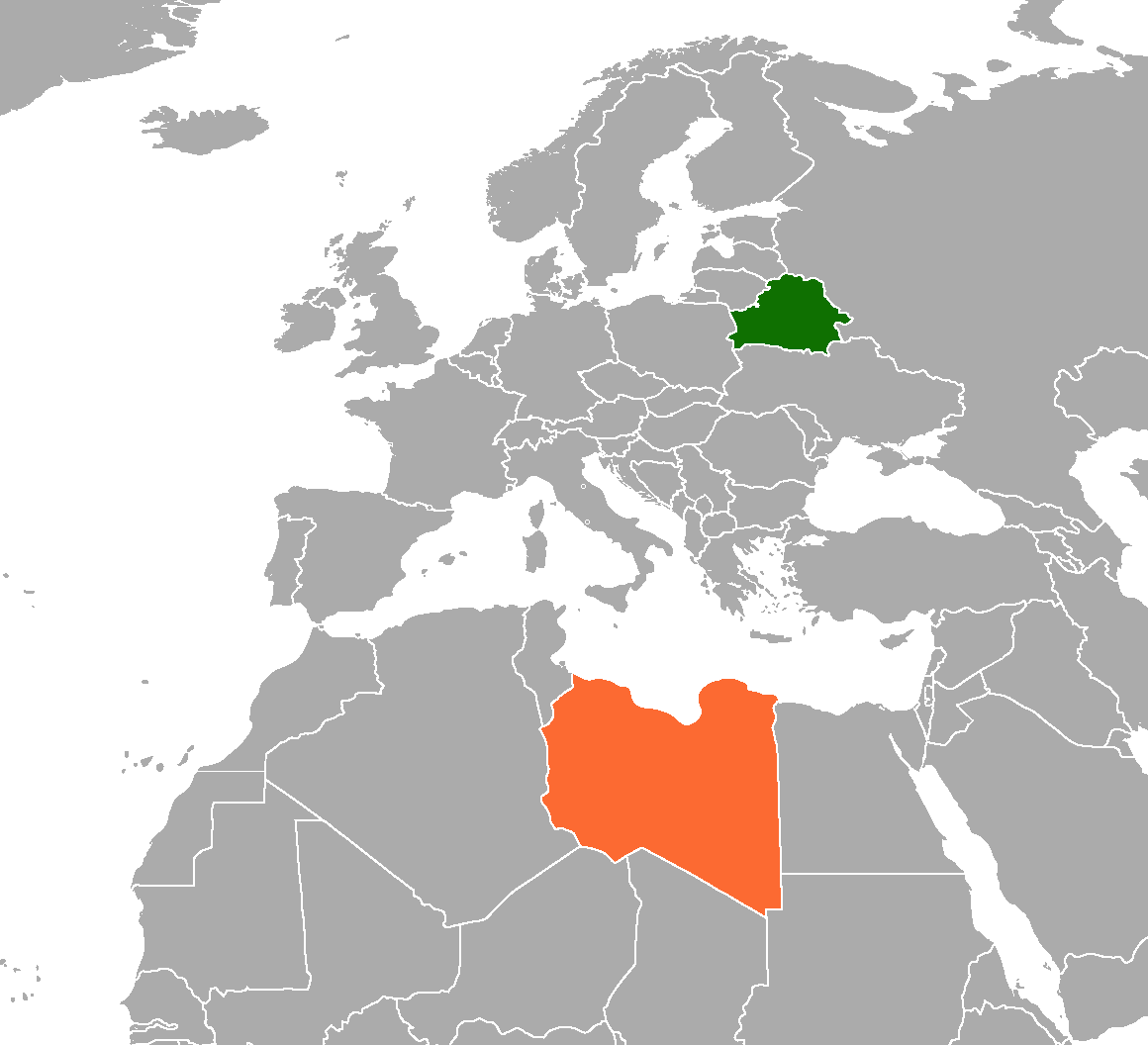

- Belarus: Libya

Belarus and Libya established diplomatic relations in 1992. Belarus has an embassy in Tripoli. Libya has an embassy in Minsk.

== Relations ==
Since the Lockerbie bombing, Belarus has been one of the few European nations to maintain diplomatic relations with Libya.

== Assistance ==
Following a failure of the Russian Government to loan Belarus USD100 million to help the Belarus economy, Libya stepped up to offer Belarus a loan.

== State visits ==
In 2000, Belarusian President Alexander Lukashenko visited Libyan leader Muammar al-Gaddafi. Lukashenko said at this meeting that he favoured "a multipolar world, peace in Northern visit and are also ready for large-scale economic cooperation".

In 2008, al-Gaddafi visited Belarus and said "The world has become unipolar because violations of the balance of power...Nobody observes the principles of the United Nations, all international norms are being violated." President Lukashenko responded "We, like you, think that the world should be multipolar" The term unipolar was a direct reference to the United States who have been critical of both Belarus and Libya.

== Agreements ==
In 2000, the two countries signed an intergovernmental agreement on trade and economic cooperation and a protocol of cooperation.

In 2001, the two countries signed memorandums of intent to cooperate in the area of petrochemicals and industry, on credit and investment cooperation.

In 2008, the two countries signed accords on taxation, standardization, broadcasts.

== 2011 Military intervention ==
Belarus condemned the military intervention in Libya, and the foreign ministry stated that "The missile strikes and bombings on the territory of Libya go beyond Resolution 1973 of the UN Security Council and are in breach of its principal goal, ensuring safety of civilian population. The Republic of Belarus calls on the states involved with the military operation to cease, with immediate effect, the military operations which lead to human casualties. The settlement of the conflict is an internal affair of Libya and should be carried out by the Libyan people alone without military intervention from outside." Belarus did not recognize the National Transitional Council.

Upon hearing the news regarding the death of Muammar Gaddafi, President Alexander Lukashenko said "Aggression has been committed, and the country's leadership, not only Muammar Gaddafi, has been killed. And how was it killed? Well, if they had shot him in a battle, it's one thing, but they humiliated and tormented him, they shot at him, they violated him when he was wounded, they twisted his neck and arms, and then they tortured him to death. It's worse than the Nazis once did." He also condemned the current situation of Libya and was critical regarding the future of the country.

== See also ==
- Foreign relations of Belarus
- Foreign relations of Libya
- Attacks on the Libyan Embassy in Minsk
