= Libya–Mauritania relations =

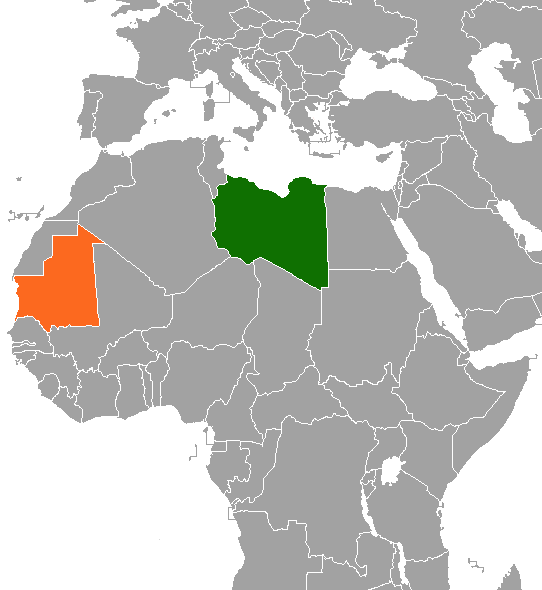

- Libya: Mauritania

Libya–Mauritania relations are the bilateral relations between Libya and Islamic Republic of Mauritania. The two countries are members of the African Union, Arab Maghreb Union, Group of 77 and the United Nations.

== History ==
Both countries established diplomatic relations on 9 January 1970. Abdallahi Hassen Ben Hmeida served as Mauritania's ambassador to Libya from 2006 to 2008 before being appointed Mauritania's foreign minister.

== Resident diplomatic missions ==
- Libya has an embassy in Nouakchott.
- Mauritania has an embassy in Tripoli.
