= Libya–Ukraine relations =

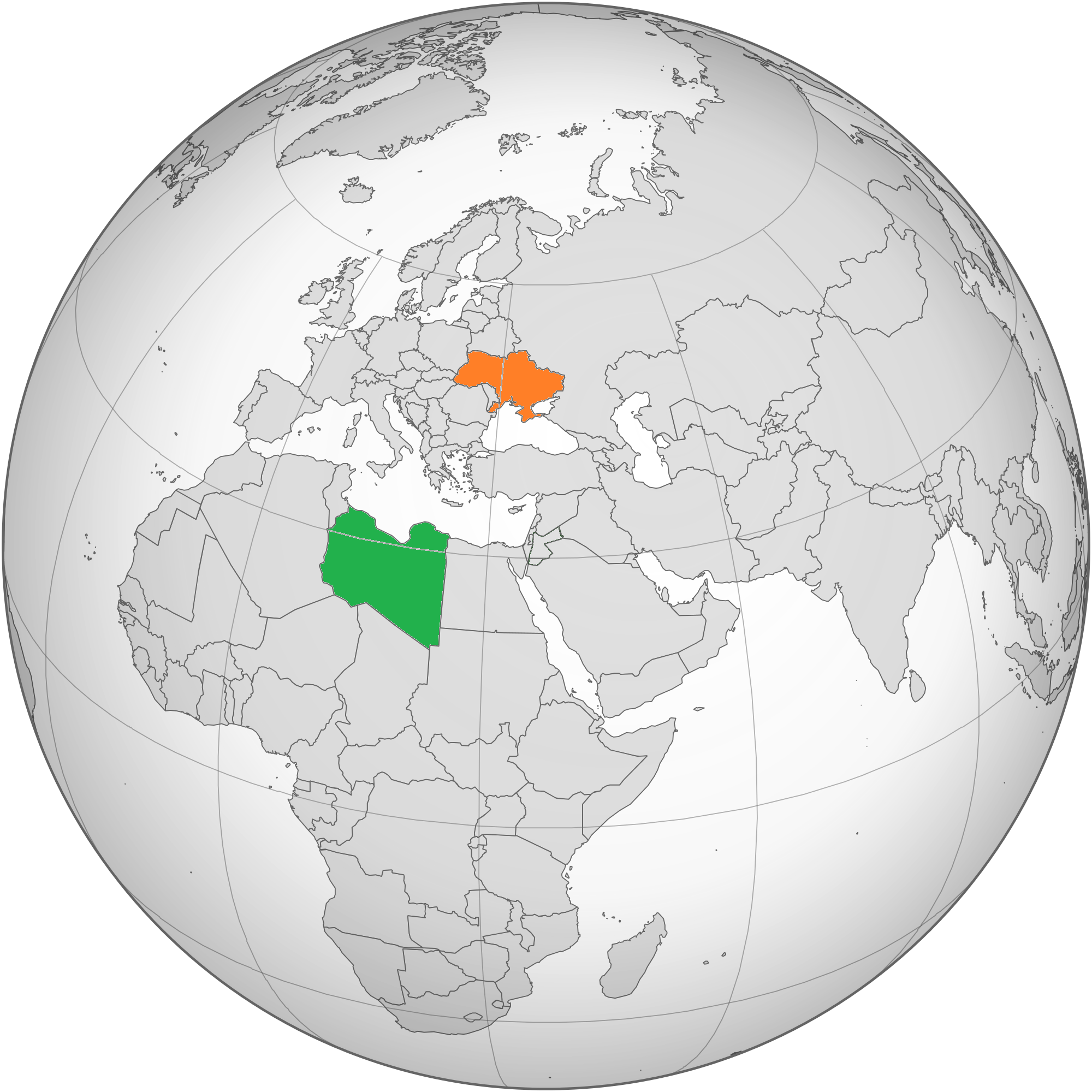

- Libya: Ukraine

Libya–Ukraine relations refer to bilateral relations between Libya and Ukraine. The two countries are members of the United Nations.

== History ==
Relations between Ukraine and Libya began during the period when the former joined the Soviet Union, when Soviet Ukrainian specialists worked on all types of civilian and military facilities, and Libyan students studied in educational institutions of Ukraine. The Libyan government was one of the first to recognize the independence of Ukraine (December 24, 1991), and diplomatic relations were established on March 17, 1992. The Libyan Embassy in Ukraine has been operating since 1993. Since 1999, the Ukrainian Embassy has been operating in Libya. Due to the escalation of the conflict in Libya, it was decided to evacuate the embassy to Tunisia. Since the overthrow of Muammar Gaddafi's regime in 2011, the country has been in constant military conflict.

== Libyan support for the territorial values Ukraine ==
The Libyan delegation voted for the UN General Assembly resolution “Territorial integrity of Ukraine” on March 27, 2014.

In 2018 they abstained on the resolution “The human rights situation in the Autonomous Republic of Crimea and the city of Sevastopol (Ukraine)” (A/RES/73/263). In the same year they did not vote on the resolution of “The problem of militarization of the Autonomous Republic of Crimea and the city of Sevastopol (Ukraine), as well as parts of the Black and Azov Seas” (A/RES/73/194).

In September 2019, Libya abstained from voting on the inclusion of the item “The situation in the temporarily occupied territories of Ukraine” on the agenda of the 74th session of the UN General Assembly.

== Contractual basis ==
There are 34 documents in force between Ukraine and Libya, focused on the economic sphere.

Key documents: Agreement on trade and economic cooperation, Agreement on the promotion and mutual protection of investments, Agreement on military-technical cooperation, Agreement on mutual recognition of educational documents and academic degrees, Agreement on cooperation in the field of science and technology, agreement on cooperation in the field labor and employment, Consular Convention.

== Trade ==
In 2018, Ukrainian exports to Libya increased by 45% compared to the same period in 2017 and amounted to almost $291 million (cereals - 80%, ferrous metals - 15%). Trade in goods and services in 2019 between Ukraine and Libya was $324,530,000. Bilateral trade turnover in 2019. Amounted to 320.0 million US dollars (Ukrainian exports decreased by 8.1% compared to 2018 and amounted to 316,900,000 US dollars, imports from Libya amounted to 3,100,000 US dollars). Bilateral trade in services in 2019. Amounted to 4,530,000 US dollars, of which Ukrainian exports amounted to 4,320,000 US dollars (+ 139.7%), imports from Libya - 0,210,000 US dollars (+ 30.2%). Bilateral trade turnover in January 2020 consisted exclusively of Ukrainian exports and amounted to $21,500,000.

== Cultural and humanitarian cooperation ==
According to the Ministry of Education of Ukraine, as of the 2019–2020 academic year, 742 Libyan students were studying in Ukraine. In 2019, the Embassy of Ukraine in Tunisia issued 224 visas for studying in Ukraine, in 2018—321 visas, in 2017—270 visas. In 2019, 1,152 visas were issued to Libyan patients.

About 1,000 Ukrainian citizens work in Libya under private contracts. Almost all of them are involved in the medical field.

== Resident diplomatic missions ==
- Libya has an embassy in Kyiv.
- Ukraine has an embassy in Tripoli.

== See also ==
- Foreign relations of Libya
- List of diplomatic missions of Libya
- List of diplomatic missions in Libya
- Foreign relations of Ukraine
- List of diplomatic missions in Ukraine
- List of diplomatic missions of Ukraine

== Links ==
- Legal framework between Ukraine and Libya – Ministry of Foreign Affairs of Ukraine
- Information on the number of Ukrainians in Libya - Ministry of Foreign Affairs of Ukraine
- Consultations between Ukraine and Libya regarding consular issues in Kyiv - Ministry of Foreign Affairs of Ukraine
