= Chile–Libya relations =

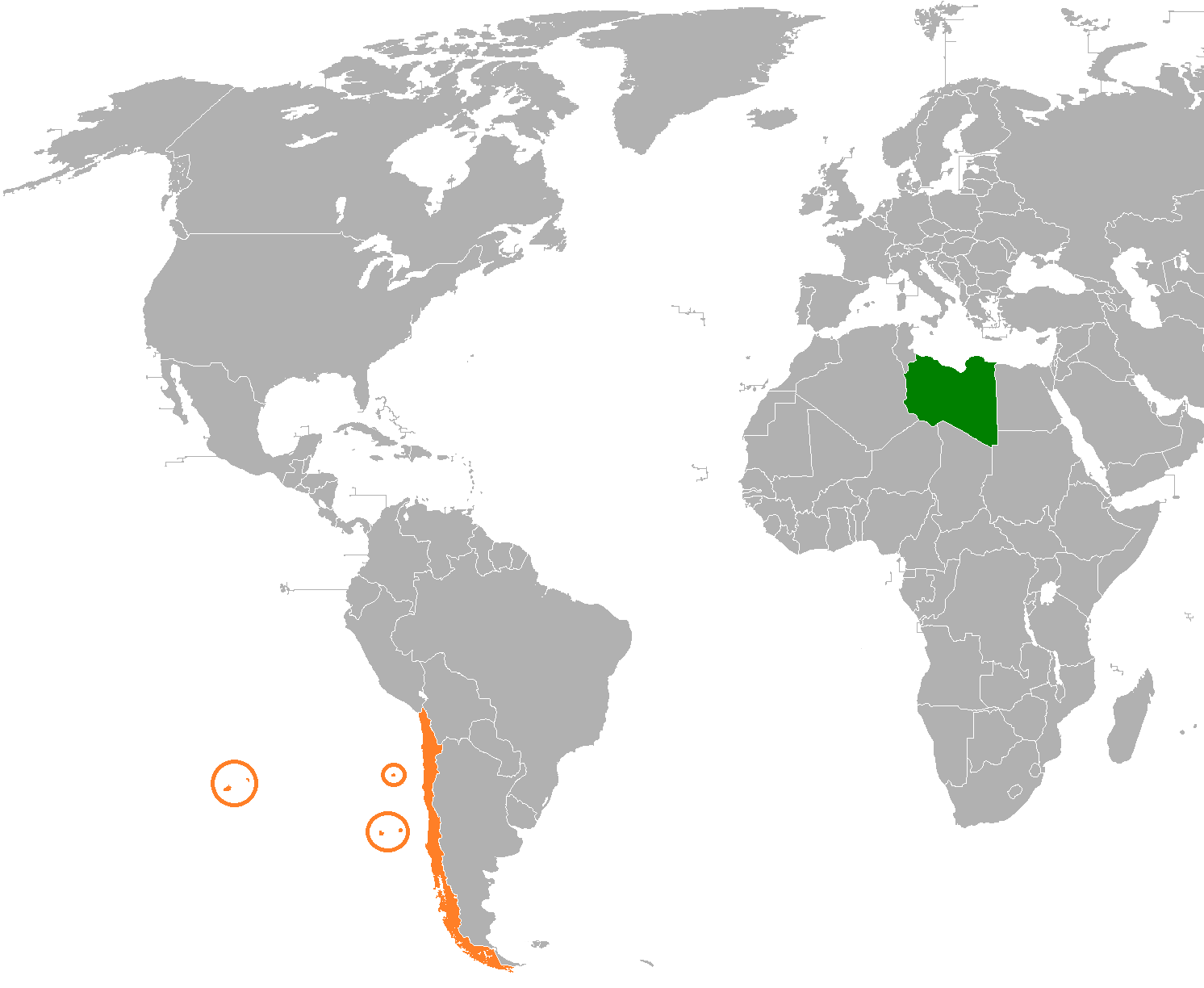

- Chile: Libya

Chile–Libya relations are the bilateral relations between Republic of Chile and Libya. The two countries are members of the Group of 77 and the United Nations.

== History ==
Both countries established diplomatic relations on 20 May 1971.

A year later, the Chilean ambassador to Egypt presented credentials in Tripoli, while Libya accredited its ambassador to Venezuela as concurrent in Santiago, who remained in that capacity until 1977.

== Trade ==
In 2010, the trade between the countries amounted to 3.8 million dollars.

== Resident diplomatic missions ==
- Libya has an embassy in Santiago.
- Chile is accredited to Libya from its embassy in Cairo.
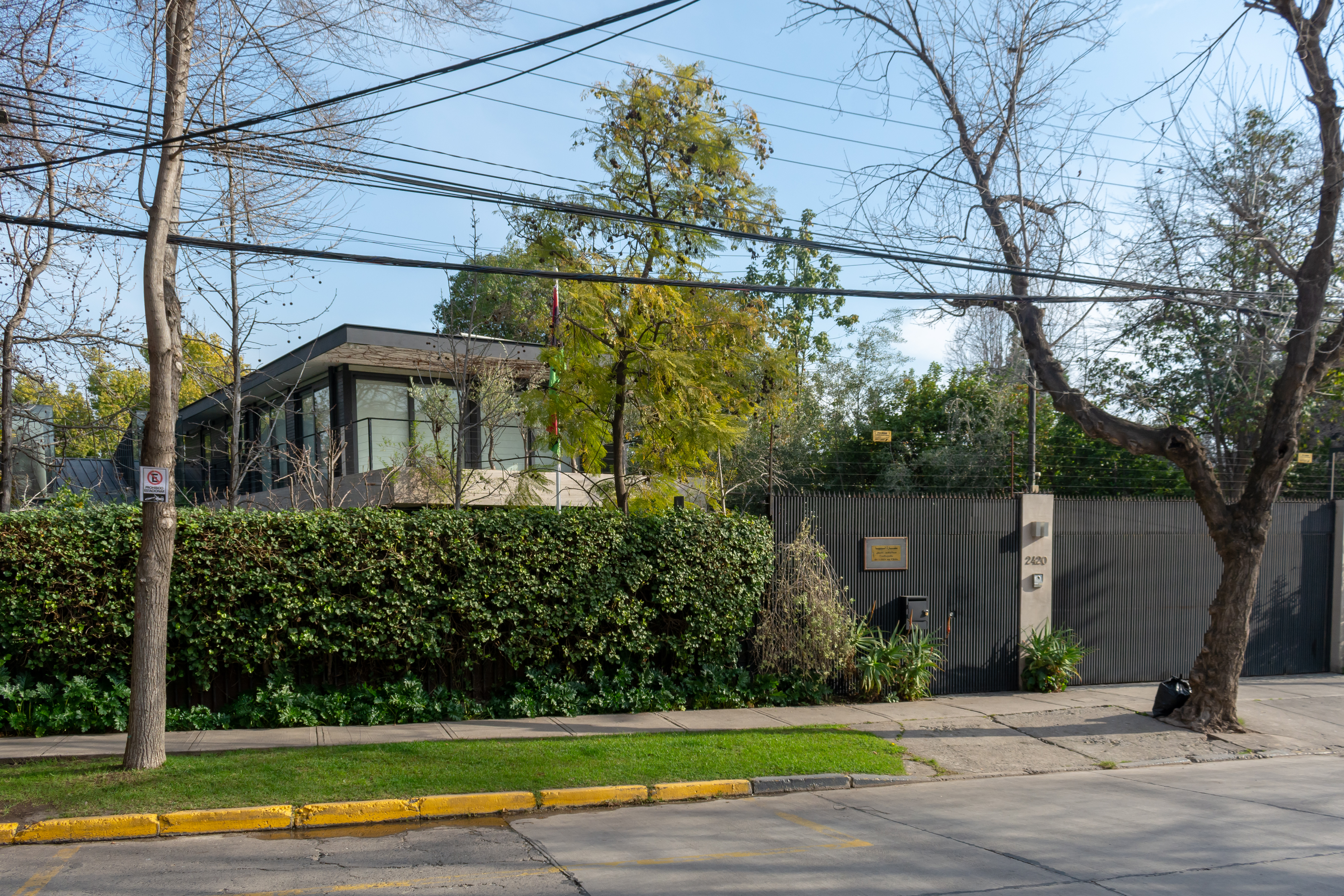
Embassy of Libya in Santiago de Chile

== See also ==
- Foreign relations of Chile
- Foreign relations of Libya
