= Libya–South Korea relations =

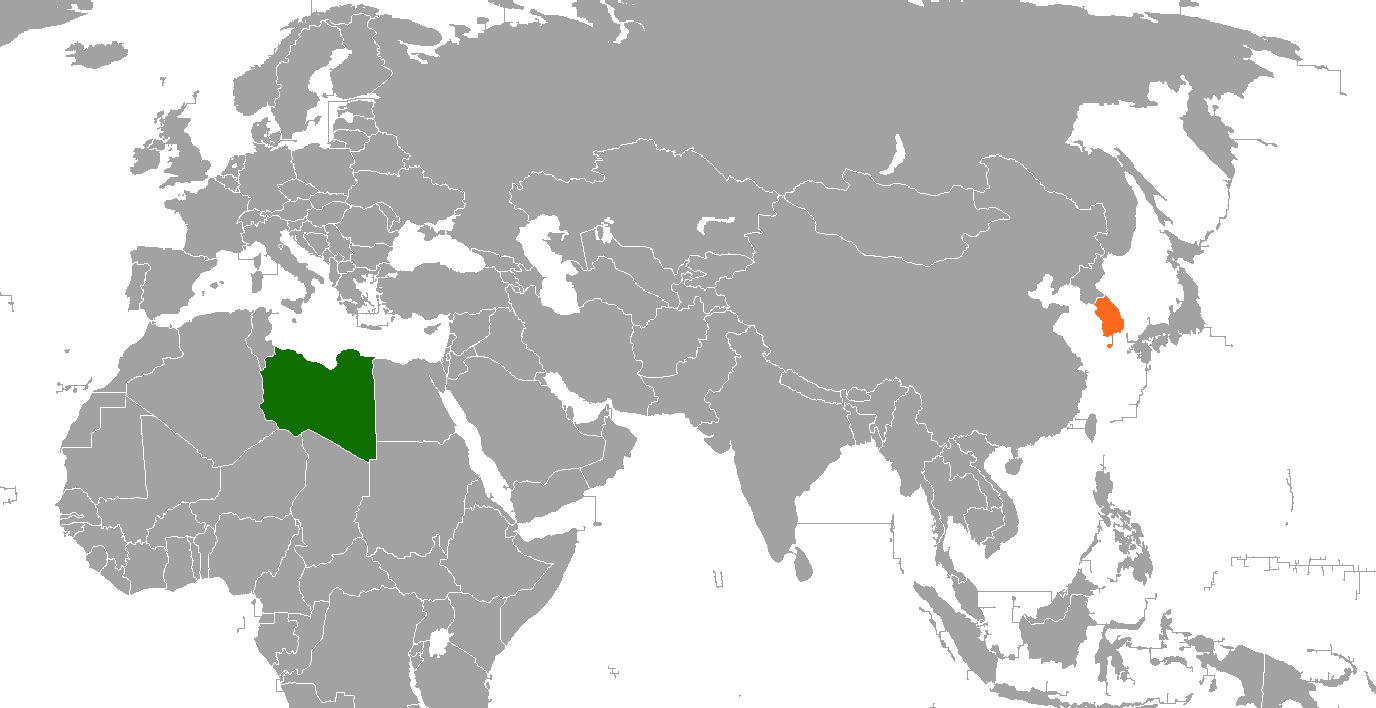

- Libya: South Korea

Libya–South Korea relations are the bilateral relations between Libya and Republic of Korea. The two countries are members of the United Nations.

== History ==
Both countries established diplomatic relations on 29 December 1980.

Libya and South Korea established a consular relationship in 1978 and established an ambassador-level relationship in 1981. Prior to the establishment of the embassy, South Korea had established and operated a Kotra office in Tripoli since 1974. Libya had previously established diplomatic relations with North Korea in 1974, and the latter reacted nervously to Libya's move to diplomatic relations with South Korea. After the establishment of diplomatic relations, Korea started human exchanges with Libya and also supported public development assistance. In addition, various Korean companies participated in Libya's civil and construction projects. The two countries are also regional cooperation partners of the Organization for Security and Co-operation in Europe. In the midst of the Libyan civil war, the South Korean government was the first country in Asia to approve the Libyan Transitional Commission.

As of 16th of april 2026. South korea and libya have agreed on establishing economic ties of Oil and Natural Gas Corporation and korean esablishment of four companies in libya and continuation of old projects

== Diaspora ==
In January 2015, the number of South Koreans living in Libya was 48.

== Resident diplomatic missions ==
- Libya has an embassy in Seoul.
- South Korea has an embassy in Tripoli.

== See also ==
- Foreign relations of Libya
- Foreign relations of South Korea
