= Azerbaijan–Libya relations =

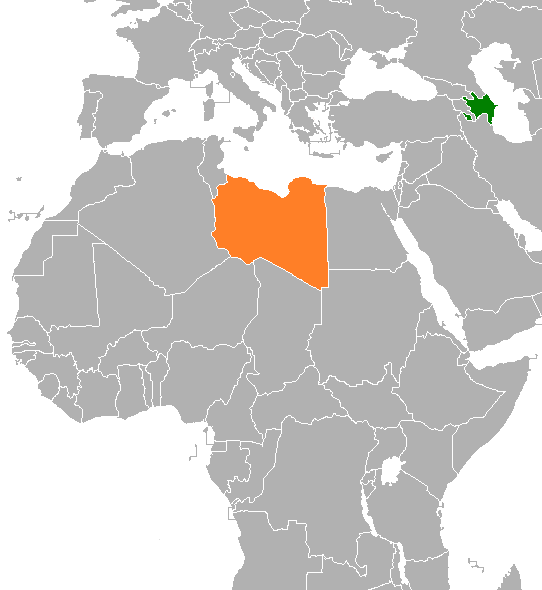

- Azerbaijan: Libya

Azerbaijan–Libya relations refer to bilateral relations between Azerbaijan and Libya. Libya has an embassy in Baku. Azerbaijan has a non-resident embassy in Cairo.

== Diplomatic relations ==
On December 30, 1991, the government of Libya recognized the independence of the Republic of Azerbaijan. Diplomatic relations between Azerbaijan and Libya were established on March 16, 1992. The Embassy of Libya in Baku has been functioning since April 1995. A joint Azerbaijan-Libya working group on inter-parliamentary relations has been functioning in the National Assembly of Azerbaijan (Milli Majlis) since November 19, 2008. In March 2010, the second session of the joint Azerbaijani-Libyan Commission was held in the Libyan capital Tripoli, during which agreements such as a memorandum on the exemption of persons holding a diplomatic passport from the visa regime was concluded.

== Economic cooperation ==
According to statistics from the United Nations trade office (COMTRADE), in 2010 Azerbaijan's export of drilling and milling machines to Libya amounted to 900 US dollars.

On March 8, 2010, the Libya-Azerbaijan business forum was held in Tripoli with the financial support of the Ministry of economic development of Libya, the Azerbaijan Export and Investment Promotion Fund (AzPromo), as well as the Chamber of Commerce, industry and agriculture of Libya.

In May 2012, the leadership of the State oil company of Azerbaijan (SOCAR) decided to start construction of an oil refinery and create a network of automobile filling stations in Libya.

In the spring of 2013, the two governments reached an agreement to start joint oil and gas production. It is planned to implement a number of projects with the participation of both public and private companies.

According to 2013 statistics, the volume of Azerbaijan's foreign trade turnover with Libya was 167.14 million US dollars, while the volume of exports was 166.27 million us dollars, and the volume of imports was 0.87 million US dollars. The trade surplus was 165.40 million US dollars. The share of Libya was 0.48%, including 0.01% for imports and 0.69% for exports.

In 2013, foreign trade turnover with Libya increased by 17.33%, including exports-16.72 times compared to 2012.

The heads of Azerbaijani companies are investing in the energy sector of Libya.

Trade turnover (in millions of US dollars)

Years	Trade turnover	Export	Import
2014	26.67	25.76	0.91
2015	-	-	-
2016	-	-	-
2017	0,1	0,1	0,0
2018	-	-	-

The basis of exports from Azerbaijan to Libya is gasoline (diesel fuel), etc.

The basis of exports from Libya to Azerbaijan are plastic pipes and hoses, plastic fittings, vinyl polymers of primary form, etc.

== International cooperation ==
Cooperation in the international arena is carried out within the framework of various international organizations: Non-Aligned Movement, the UN, Organisation of Islamic Cooperation, etc.

== Humanitarian assistance ==
In March 2013, as part of the "fight against avoidable blindness" campaign, the Azerbaijan International Development Agency (AIDA), the Ministry of foreign affairs of Azerbaijan and the Islamic Development Bank (IDB) sent humanitarian aid to the Libyan city of Ubara.

== See also ==
- Foreign relations of Azerbaijan
- Foreign relations of Libya
