= Kazakhstan–Libya relations =

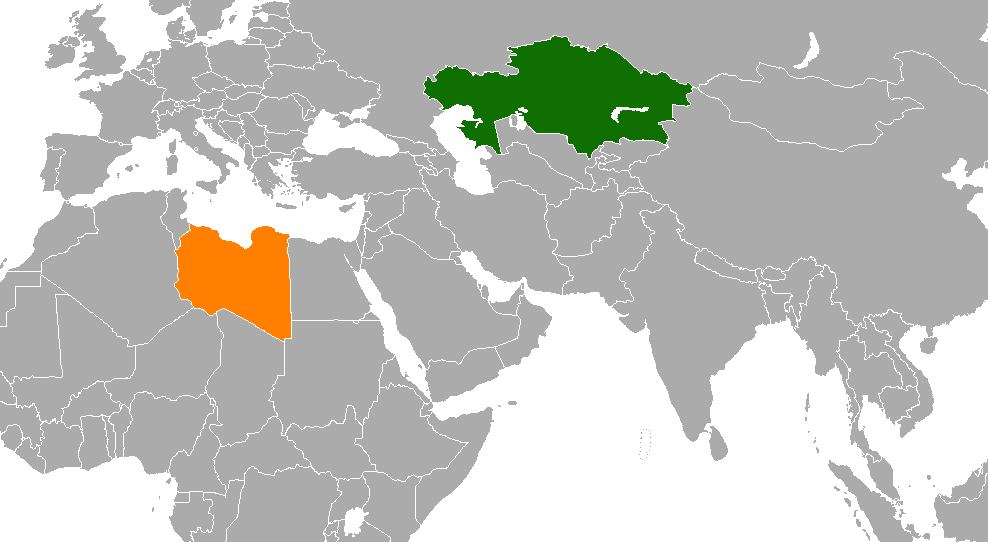

- Kazakhstan: Libya

Kazakhstan–Libya relations refer to the bilateral relations between Kazakhstan and Libya. The two countries are members of the United Nations.

== Diplomacy ==
Both countries established diplomatic relations on 13 March 1992.

Embassy of Libya was opened in Almaty in 1992. Diplomatic mission of Kazakhstan in Libya has been working since 2003. Due to the beginning of revolutionary events in Libya, the representative office of our country was closed in October 2011.

== History and political and economic relations ==
In January 2003 in Tripoli and November 2007, two meetings of the Kazakhstan–Libya joint intergovernmental commission were held in Astana.

The volume of trade between the two countries in 2014 was ~1.8 million dollars, and in 2015 ~0.4 million dollars (mainly exports of the Republic of Kazakhstan).

== Resident diplomatic missions ==
- Libya has an embassy in Astana.
- Kazakhstan is accredited to Libya from its embassy in Cairo.

== See also ==
- Foreign relations of Kazakhstan
- Foreign relations of Libya
