= Czech Republic–Libya relations =

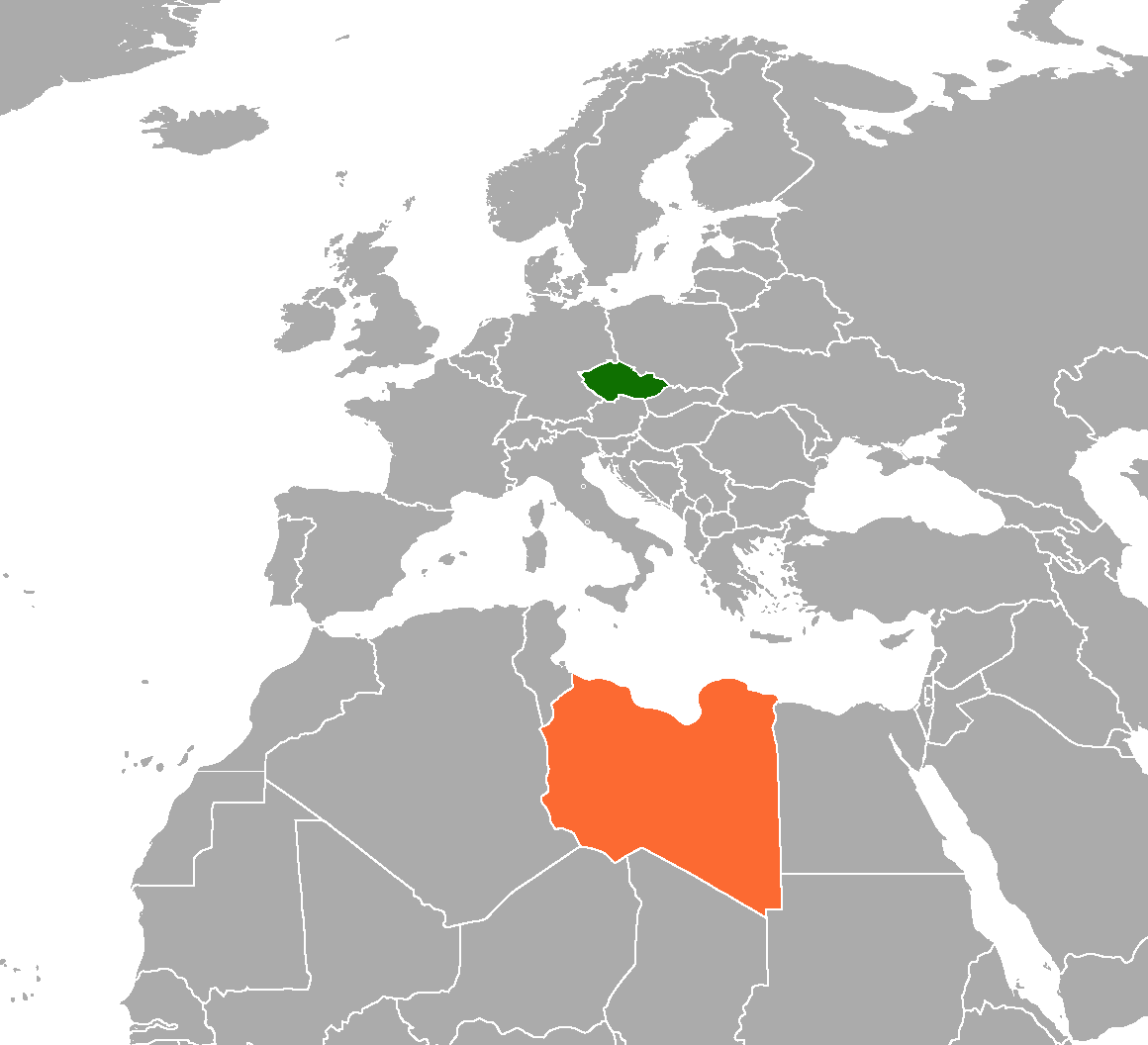

- Czech Republic: Libya

Czech Republic–Libya relations are foreign relations between Czech Republic and Libya. Both countries established diplomatic relations in 1993. The Czech Republic has an embassy in Tripoli. Libya has a consulate in Prague.

== Relations ==
The Czech Republic imposed sanctions on Libya in 1997 under a United Nations resolution following the 1988 Lockerbie bombing. This was lifted in 2006 by Czech President Václav Klaus.

Libya had an embassy in Prague, although this closed in 2007. In 2008 the country opened a consulate general in the same city.

Alongside Italy, the Czech Republic supported Muammar Gaddafi in the Libyan Civil War towards the beginning of the conflict. Following the death of Gaddafi in October 2011, the Czech Republic took a different stance and looked to move forward with an improved relationship between the two countries.

In 2013 Libyan judges were sent to the Czech town of Kroměříž for a five-day training programme in conjunction with the United Nations Development Programme.

== See also ==
- Foreign relations of the Czech Republic
- Foreign relations of Libya
