= Haiti–Libya relations =

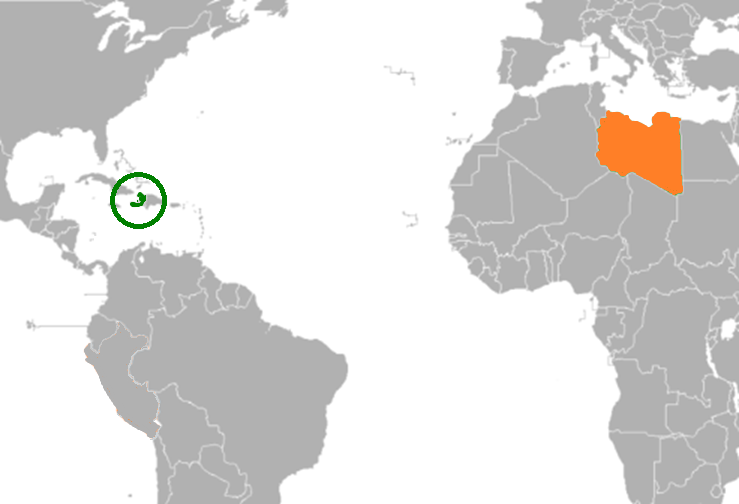

- Haiti: Libya

Haiti–Libya relations describe the bilateral relationship between the Republic of Haiti and Libya, both countries are members in the United Nations.

== History ==
The corresponding joint declaration was notified to the Secretary-General of the United Nations in New York on January 18, 1979, by the Permanent Representatives of both countries.

Haiti's Permanent Representative, Emile Saint-Lot, cast the deciding vote in the United Nations Security Council against the plan to turn Libya into three separate states under foreign control (Bevin-Sforza Plan).

== See also ==
- Foreign relations of Haiti
- Foreign relations of Libya
