= Libya–Vietnam relations =

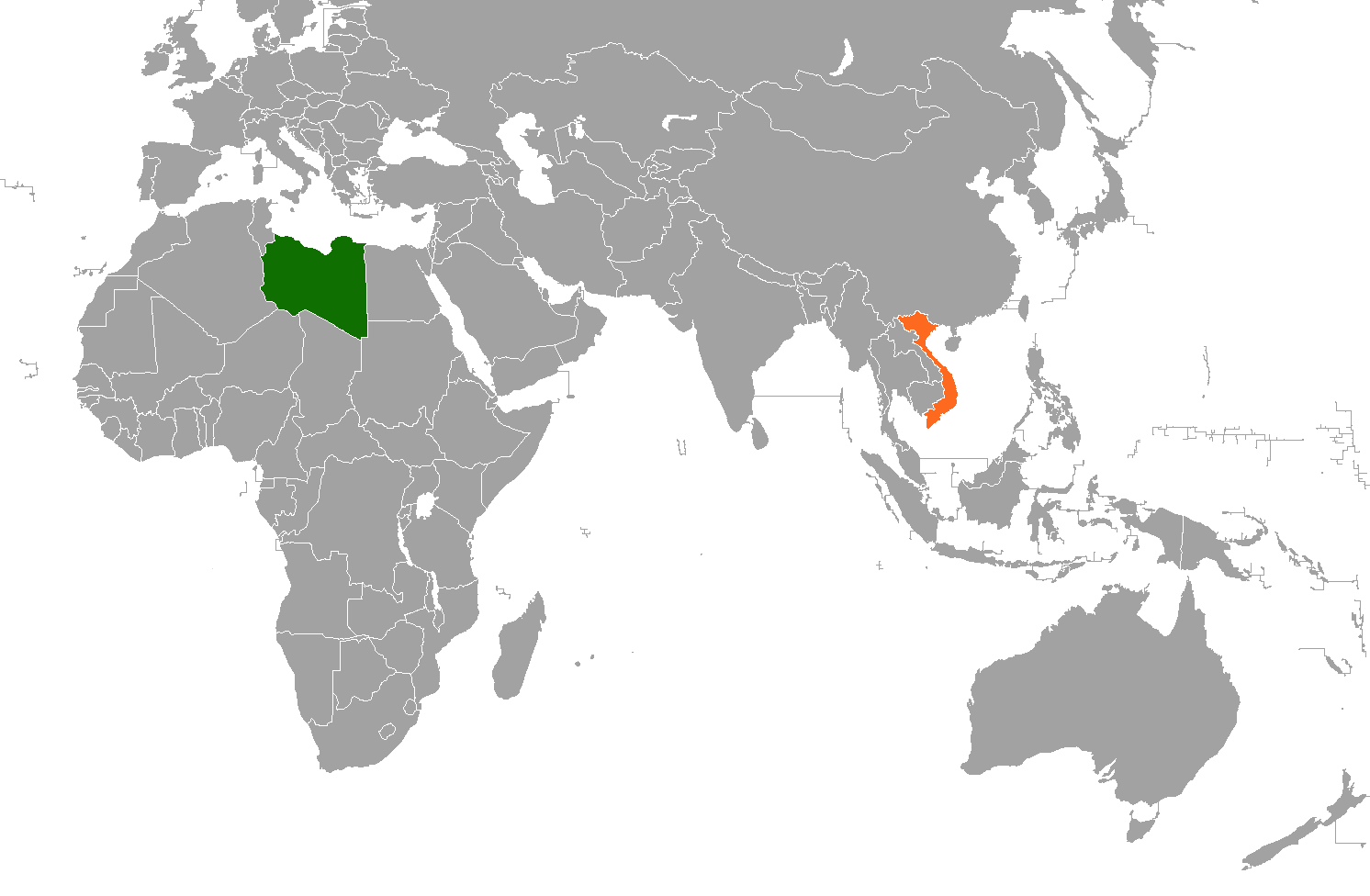

- Libya: Vietnam

Libya–Vietnam relations refer to bilateral relations between Libya and Socialist Republic of Vietnam. The two countries are members of the Group of 77 and the United Nations.

The two countries established diplomatic relations on March 15, 1975. The basis of the relationship is that both countries claim to follow socialism, one-party leadership.

== History ==
The Intergovernmental Committee met for the 10th time in Hanoi in February 1998 and for the 9th time in Tripoli from May 14-17, 2001. The 10th session of the National Committee of the two countries met in Hanoi from December 12-14, 2007. At this meeting, the two sides reviewed the minutes of the 9th session, signed a cooperation protocol between VCCI and Libya Chamber of Commerce-CN. Deputy Prime Minister Pham Gia Khiem received the head of the delegation on behalf of the Prime Minister.

The Committee of the two countries met for the 10th session from December 12-14, 2007 in Hanoi and the 11th session in Tripoli in 2008. The delegation of the Vietnam Committee in solidarity with Libya visited and attended a seminar on colonial compensation.

As of 2023, Vietnam had nearly 4000 employees in Libya.

The two countries exchanged delegations and agreements:

- Agreement on Economic and Scientific and Technical Cooperation (February 19, 1976)
- Trade Agreement (October 17, 1983).
- MOU cooperation between 2 BNG (January 31, 2007).

Libya supported Hanoi when North Vietnam was still a rival to the United States in the Indochina War. North Africa supported the Viet Minh and later North Vietnam.

In the Arab World, which has repeatedly lost to the West, the spirit of "Vietnam wins over the US" is a cheer for anti-imperialists.

The website of the Vietnamese Embassy in Libya states: "The two countries have always supported and helped each other in the previous struggle for independence and freedom as well as in the current construction and development of the country"

=== After Libyan civil war ===
Due to the impact of the Libyan civil war, the overthrow of the Gaddafi regime led to the overlap in diplomatic relations between Libya and Vietnam, almost freezing even though the Hanoi government had acknowledged the new government in Libya. Currently, the relations between Libya and Vietnam are relatively warm, and there is good cooperation between the current Libyan transitional government and the Vietnamese government in various political and economic fields. Currently, the relations between Libya and Vietnam is relatively warm, and There is a good cooperation between the current Libyan transitional government and the Vietnamese government in various political and economic fields, and signing an economic agreements in 2025.

== Resident diplomatic missions ==
- Libya has an embassy in Hanoi.
- Vietnam is accredited to Libya from its embassy in Cairo.

== See also ==
- Foreign relations of Libya
- List of diplomatic missions of Libya
- List of diplomatic missions in Libya
- Foreign relations of Vietnam
- List of diplomatic missions in Vietnam
- List of diplomatic missions of Vietnam
