= Albania–Libya relations =

- Albania: Libya

Diplomatic mission
- Embassy of Libya, Tirana

Albania–Libya relations refers to bilateral relations between Albania and Libya. Libya has an embassy in Tirana.

== History ==
On 29 March 2011, Foreign Minister Edmond Haxhinasto said Albania would open its airspace and territorial waters to coalition forces and said its seaports and airports were at the coalition's disposal upon request. Haxhinasto also suggested that Albania could make a "humanitarian" contribution to international efforts. In mid-April, the International Business Times listed Albania alongside several other NATO member states, including Romania, Italy, Greece and Turkey, that have made contributions to the military effort, although it did not go into detail. The Albanian Foreign Ministry announced on 18 July in a statement, "The Albanian government backs the activities of the National Transitional Council and its program for a democratic Libya, and considers the council to be the legitimate representative of the Libyan people." Even prior to recognition, Albania was a staunch supporter of the military intervention in Libya. On 22 August 2011, the Ministry of Foreign Affairs congratulated "the people of Libya ... [on] marking the end of the dictatorial regime of Muammar Gaddafi" and said it would work to strengthen bilateral relations between Tirana and Tripoli, and on 23 August 2011, Albanian President Bamir Topi congratulated the NTC on what it called "a historic moment in the deposal of one of the dictatorial regimes of our era". On 29 August 2011, the Libyan Embassy in Tirana changed its flag from Gaddafi's green banner to the tricolour adopted by the NTC.

== See also ==
- Foreign relations of Albania
- Foreign relations of Libya
