= Libya–Suriname relations =

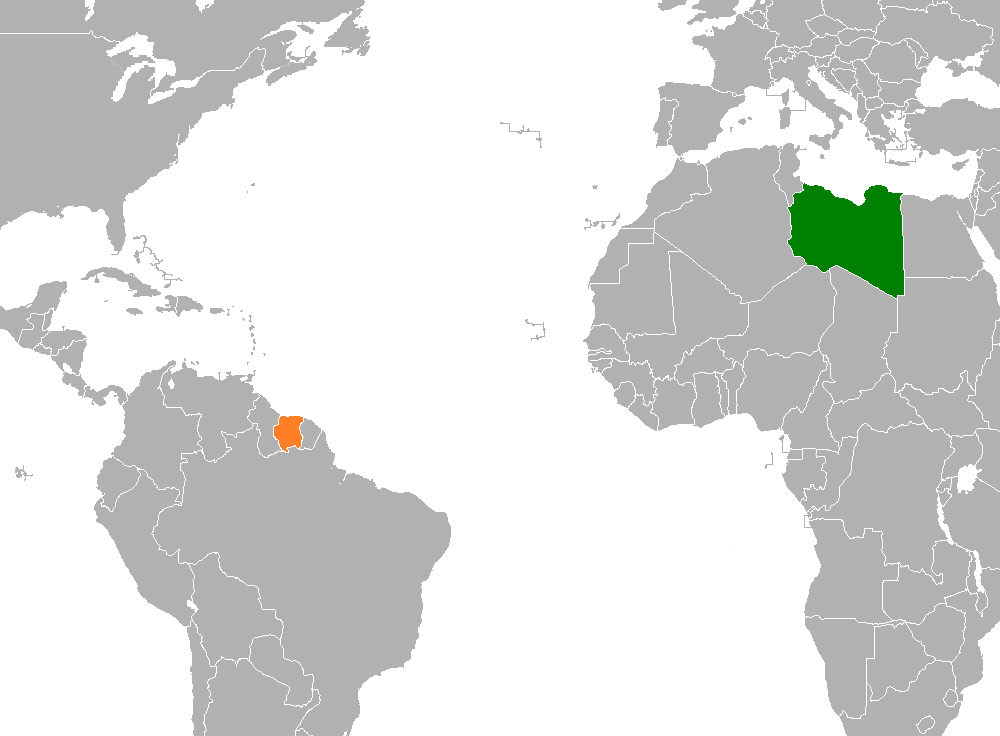

- Libya: Suriname

Libya–Suriname relations are the bilateral relations between Libya and Republic of Suriname. The two countries are members of the Organisation of Islamic Cooperation, Non-Aligned Movement, Group of 77 and the United Nations.

== History ==
=== 1980s ===
After the December murders of 1982, the Netherlands suspended development cooperation with Suriname, which put the country in financial distress. As early as January 1983, a payment of approximately 60 million guilders was not made and Suriname could not expect any financial support from South America. During this time, Libya and Suriname became closer and held talks in Brussels, where both countries had an embassy. The Libyan leader, Colonel Muammar Gaddafi, was willing to supply Suriname with oil at a lower price than on the world market. In exchange, he wanted to import rice from Suriname and gain political influence in Suriname, which he had been interested in for some time. While Bouterse was visiting Libya in mid-March 1983, he and Qadhafi signed a cooperation agreement.

The need for contact with Libya disappeared somewhat after ties with Brazil were strengthened. For Brazil, this move was mainly intended to keep Suriname out of the sphere of influence of undesirable countries such as Cuba, Grenada and Libya. Internally it divided the parties that supported Bouterse, the PALU and RVP. At the beginning of February 1985, a Surinamese delegation including Henk Herrenberg and Ivan Graanoogst was on a trade mission in Libya.

At the beginning of March 1985, Bouterse was back in Libya and signed a number of contracts to deepen cooperation. Libya signed for, among other things, exploration for oil fields in Suriname and a loan of 30 million dollars. Gaddafi's Bedouin tent had impressed Bouterse. Back in his own country, he ordered the construction of an Indian tent to receive foreign guests.

In 1985, Libyan soldiers came to train Surinamese soldiers. They also appeared in Guyana and maintained contacts with a group of people in French Guiana who were striving for independence. The presence of the military caused great concern in France and the United States.

After the American bombing of the Libyan capital Tripoli on April 15, 1986, Bouterse reacted with shock and asked the Non-Aligned Movement to mediate. In an interview with Reuters around August 1, 1986, Bouterse made it known that he wanted to take a step back if the Surinamese people so wished. He further said: “One of the most important things I have learned in the past six years is to avoid getting caught in the firing line of the East-West conflict.” Nevertheless, Libyans were also active in Suriname afterwards and Libya supplied Bell helicopters to Suriname for use in the Internal War against the Jungle Command.

In August 1987, Bouterse visited Libya again. While Foreign Minister Henk Heidweiller had previously accompanied him during his visit to Ghana, he did not come to Libya, which was interpreted as a sign that there was no agreement on good relations with Libya. US Ambassador Robert Barbour warned Bouterse at that time in an open letter to respect the results of the November 25 parliamentary elections.

Democratically elected President Ramsewak Shankar was installed on January 25, 1988. In September of that year, a senior Libyan diplomat announced that his country would like to strengthen relations with Suriname.

=== 2010s ===
In early March 2011, during the first Bouterse cabinet, Suriname supported a motion to remove Libya from the United Nations Human Rights Council. Foreign Minister Winston Lackin indicated that this position had been taken jointly within CARICOM. At that time, the First Libyan Civil War was already underway, which ended with the death of Gaddafi.

== Diplomatic missions ==
Neither country has a resident ambassador.

- Libya is accredited to Suriname from its embassy in Caracas.
- Suriname is accredited to Libya from its embassy in Rabat.
