= Grenada–Libya relations =

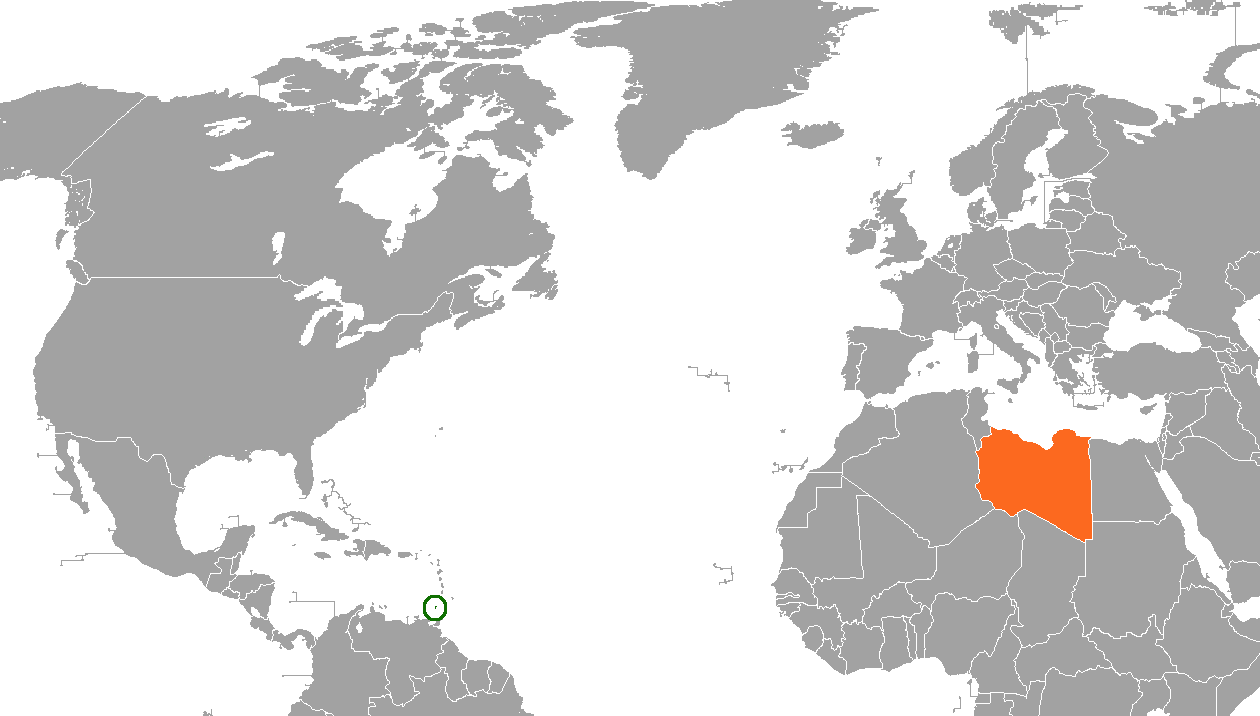

- Grenada: Libya

Grenada–Libya relations were formal diplomatic relations between the People's Revolutionary Government of Grenada and Socialist People’s Libyan Arab Jamahiriya between 1979 and November 1983. They were resumed in 1998. Neither country has a resident ambassador. Libya has a non resident ambassador in Castries.

== History ==
During the United States invasion of Grenada, Libya had 3 or 4 troops present.

In 1982, at the time, Grenadian president Maurice Bishop wrote a letter to the Libyan leader, Colonel Muammar Gaddafi, asking if it would be possible to borrow six million US dollars as a soft loan to complete the runway at Point Salines International Airport (now known as Maurice Bishop International Airport), which Gaddafi agreed to.
