= Libya–South Africa relations =

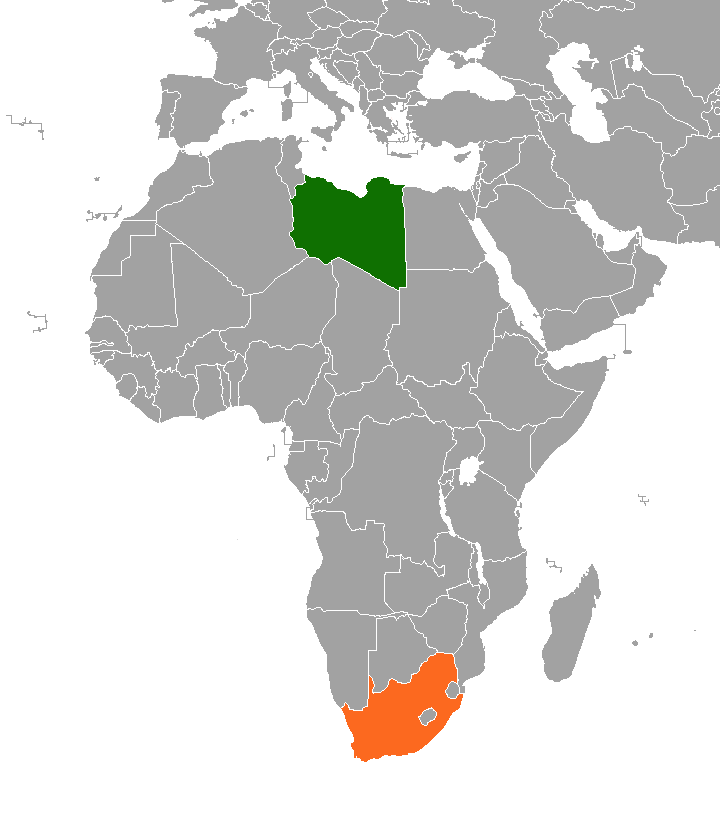

- Libya: South Africa

Libya–South Africa relations refer to the current and historical relationship between Libya and South Africa.

== Political relations ==
- 1969-1994 - Gaddafi regime in Libya hostile to South African apartheid government, supporting anti-apartheid movements and ANC military training.
- 1990 - Nelson Mandela visits Gaddafi to thank him for support.
- 1994 - After apartheid ends, South Africa's ANC government shifts to friendly relations with Libya.
- 1994 - Mandela invites Gaddafi to his swearing-in ceremony, despite American criticism.
- 1997 - South Africa bestows the Order of Good Hope on Gaddafi.
- 2011 - South Africa criticizes NATO's intervention in Libya; and supports African Union's peace plan.
- 2024 - Libya joins South Africa’s genocide case against Israel at the International Court of Justice (ICJ).

== Military Relations ==
- 1970s-1990s - Libya provides military training and financial support to ANC combatants.
- 2011 - South Africa opposes NATO bombing of Gaddafi forces, maintains support for Gaddafi's government.

== Economic relations ==
- 1994 - Bilateral trade and investment between South Africa and Libya increase significantly post-apartheid.
- 2011 - Post Gaddafi, South Africa slows to recognize the NTC; and is reluctant to unfreeze $1.5 billion of Libyan assets.

== Additional Sources ==
- McKaiser, Eusebius (August 21, 2011). SA's response to the Libyan crisis: An analysis, Politics Web, South Africa.
