= Abdallahi Hassen Ben Hmeida =

Mauritanian politician (born 1954)

Abdallahi Hassen Ben Hmeida (born in 1954) is a Mauritanian diplomat who was briefly Minister of Foreign Affairs and Cooperation in 2008.

Ben Hmeida was born in the Inchiri region. After working at Radio Mauritania, he served as First Secretary at Mauritanian embassies in various countries from 1982 to 2000. He was then an Adviser to the Minister of Foreign Affairs and Cooperation from 2000 to 2003, Secretary-General of the Ministry of Culture from 2004 to 2005, and Secretary-General of the Ministry of National Education from 2005 to 2006.

Subsequently, after serving as Ambassador to Libya from 2006 to 2008, Hmeida was appointed Minister of Foreign Affairs and Cooperation in the government that was named on July 15, 2008. He served in that post only briefly (1 month), however; President Sidi Ould Cheikh Abdallahi was ousted in a military coup on August 6, 2008, and Hmeida was dismissed and replaced as Foreign Minister by Mohamed Mahmoud Ould Mohamedou in the government appointed by the junta on August 31.
