= Jordan–Libya relations =

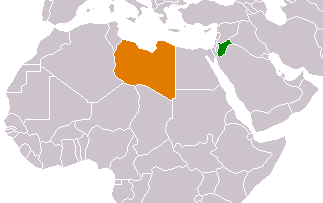

- Jordan: Libya

Jordan–Libya relations are the bilateral relations between Hashemite Kingdom of Jordan and Libya. The two countries are members of the Arab League and the United Nations.

== History ==
The two countries established diplomatic relations starting with their independence, and were full members of the Arab League. In February 1984, a Libyan mob burned down the Jordanian embassy in Tripoli, in response to King Hussein's attempts to negotiate the Arab-Israeli conflict. Also, during the Iran–Iraq War, Jordan supported Iraq while Libya stood by Iran. In 1987, Libya called on Iran and Iraq to reach a peace agreement, and as a result, in September of that year, Jordan and Libya renewed their diplomatic relations.

In December 2018, Faiz al-Sarraj, Chairman of the Libyan Presidential Council and Prime Minister of the Government of National Accord, visited Amman, and met with Abdullah II, King of Jordan and Jordanian Prime Minister Omar Razzaz. During the visit, Jordan promised financial support to Libya, and in addition, the two countries reached an agreement Regarding the settlement of Libya's debts to Jordan.

== Resident diplomatic missions ==
- Libya has an embassy in Amman.
- Jordan has an embassy in Tripoli.
