= Libya–Nicaragua relations =

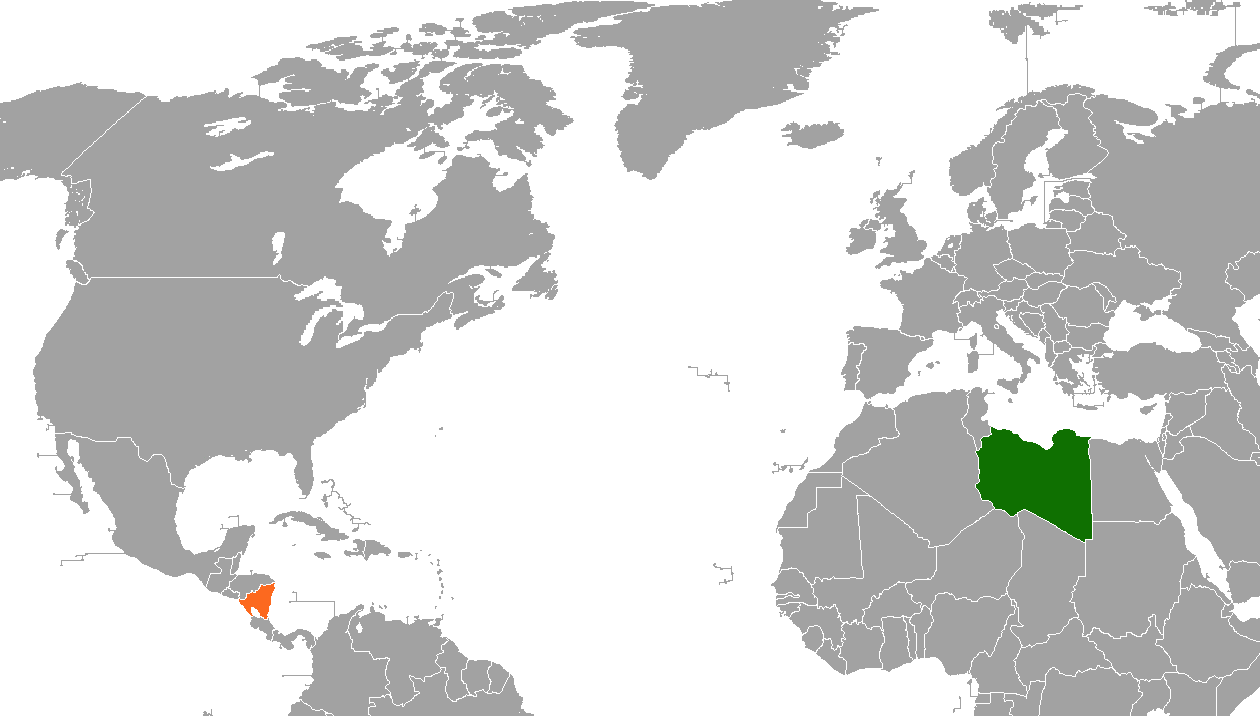

- Libya: Nicaragua

Libya and the Republic of Nicaragua established bilateral relations in 1986. The two countries are members of the Group of 77, Non-Aligned Movement and the United Nations.

== History ==
Both countries established diplomatic relations on 10 March 1986.

During First Libyan civil war, Nicaraguan president Daniel Ortega said he had telephoned Libya to express his solidarity with Muammar Gaddafi.

After Gaddafi's death, Daniel Ortega condemned the death of Muammar Gaddafi. Foreign Minister Miguel d'Escoto Brockmann lamented the killing and slammed the U.S. by saying, "This is all part of the same imperial aggression that we see against Iraq and Afghanistan. It’s a very sad time in which we’re living."

== Resident diplomatic missions ==
- Libya has an embassy in Managua.
- Nicaragua is accredited to Libya from its embassy in Cairo.
