= Iraq–Libya relations =

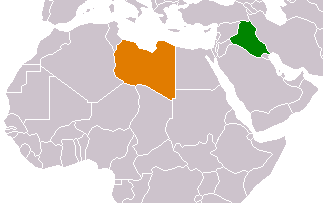

- Iraq: Libya

Iraq–Libya relations are the bilateral relations between Iraq and Libya.

== History ==
Both countries established diplomatic relations on 21 May 1955 when Mr. Abdul Munim Gailani, Envoy Extraordinary and minister Plenipotentiary of Iraq to Libya presented his letters of credence.

== Resident diplomatic missions ==
- Libya has an embassy in Baghdad.
- Iraq has an embassy in Tripoli.
