= Libya–Yemen relations =

- Libya: Yemen

Libya–Yemen relations refer to the current and historical relationship of Libya and Yemen. The two have generally enjoyed cordial and friendly relations throughout history, especially when both were led by socialist-leaning governments that were aligned with the Soviet Union. They both shared a common anti-colonial and anti-imperialist stance, and supported liberation movements in Africa and Palestine. In 2010, Libyan leader Muammar Gaddafi and Yemeni leader Ali Abdullah Saleh met at the Arab-African summit in Sirte, Libya. Libya has an embassy in Sana'a, while Yemen has an embassy in Tripoli. Both the countries have many cultural proximities and are members of the Non-Aligned Movement, Arab League, Council of Arab Economic Unity, Organisation of Islamic Cooperation (OIC) and the UN.
