= Australia–Libya relations =

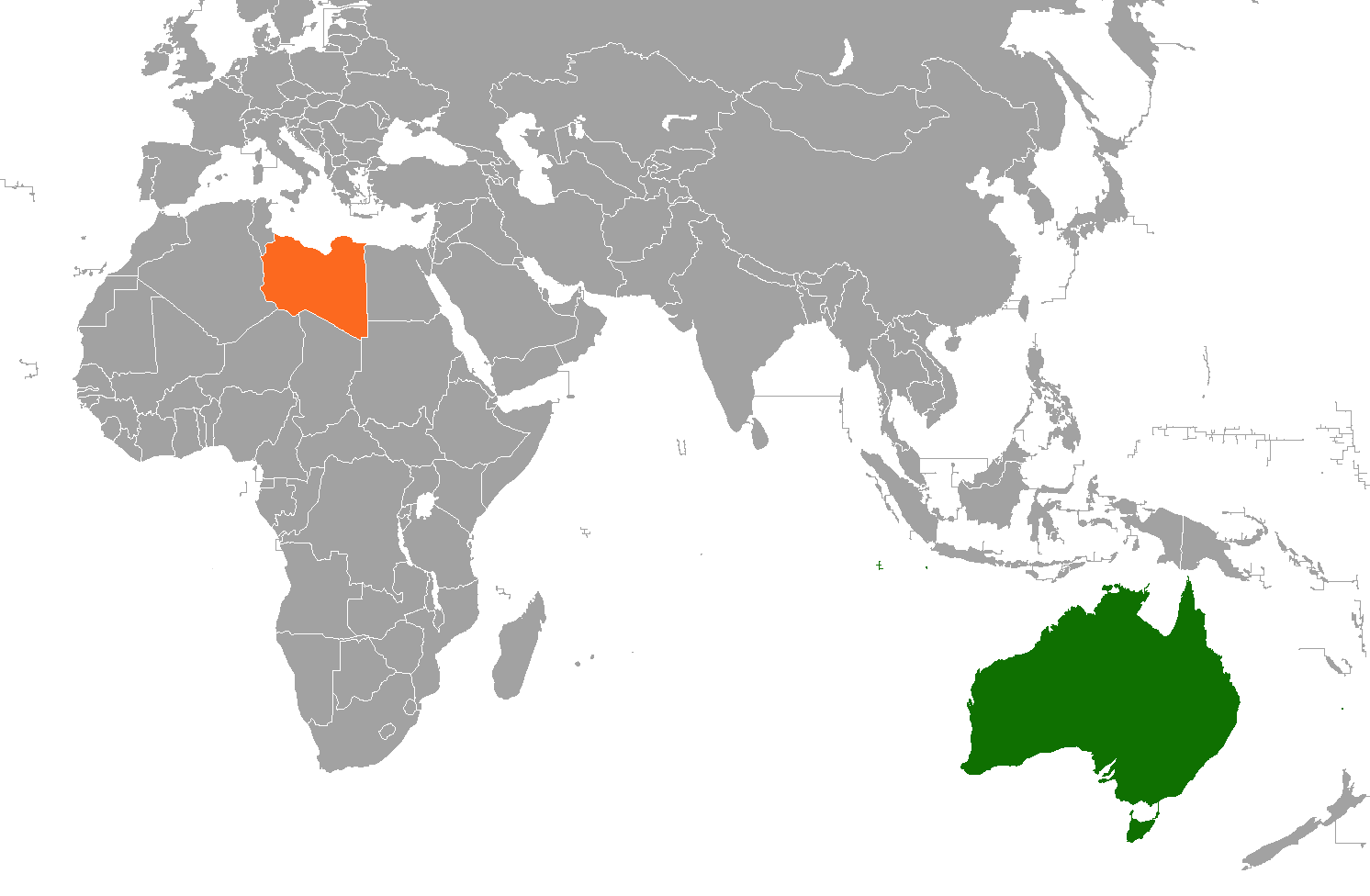

- Australia: Libya

Australia–Libya relations are the bilateral relations between Australia and Libya. The two countries are members of the United Nations.

== History ==
Both countries established diplomatic relations on 4 January 1978.

Australia and Libya announced the establishment of diplomatic relations on 4 January 1978. A Libyan People's Bureau was opened in Canberra and the Australian ambassador to Italy was accredited on a non-resident basis.

Between 18 and 21 April 1987, Muammar Gaddafi organized an international forum in Misratah for Pacific islands, which focused on the presence of imperialism in the Pacific. This forum included separatist and liberation movements from New Caledonia, Papua, East Timor, and Aceh, as well as delegates from the Philippines and the Australian Aboriginal movement. Michael Mansell, an Aboriginal activist who advocated for the rights of Australia’s Indigenous peoples, was at the forum.

The Misratah conference provoked a strong reaction from both Australia and New Zealand. The two countries considered the forum held by Libya as not just a place for solidarity, but as a potential threat to the stability of the Pacific region. The backlash was evident in an official statement that underscored fears of "external interference" in regional affairs. Concerns about Libya's destabilizing activities in the Pacific, part of a broader sponsorship by Gaddafi of such activities around the world, led to the expulsion of the Bureau in Canberra in 1987. This action was taken based on an intelligence report indicating that Libya’s diplomatic mission was functioning as a financial support channel for the separatist movement.

As part of a shift in Libya's foreign policy following the September 11 attacks, diplomatic relations were restored in 2002, the Libyan People's Bureau reopened in Canberra and the Australian ambassador in Rome resumed non-resident accreditation. This has remained the case, though with the Bureau's name reverting to embassy following the overthrow of Gaddafi.

Australia was a major non-military backer of the revolutionaries during the Libyan Civil War, sending more humanitarian aid to Libya than any other single country after the United States. It was relatively early to recognise the NTC, doing so on 9 June 2011, months before the capture of Tripoli.

In December 2011 Australian Foreign Affairs Minister Kevin Rudd traveled to Libya to meet with Libyan Prime Minister Abdurrahim El-Keib. Rudd ceremonially hoisted the flag of Australia at his country's consul-general in Tripoli and pledged Canberra's support for efforts to remove unexploded landmines in Libya, as well as advice on Libya's planned transition to democratic governance.

== Resident diplomatic missions ==
- Libya has an embassy in Canberra.
- Australia is accredited to Libya from its embassy in Cairo.
