= Libya–Portugal relations =

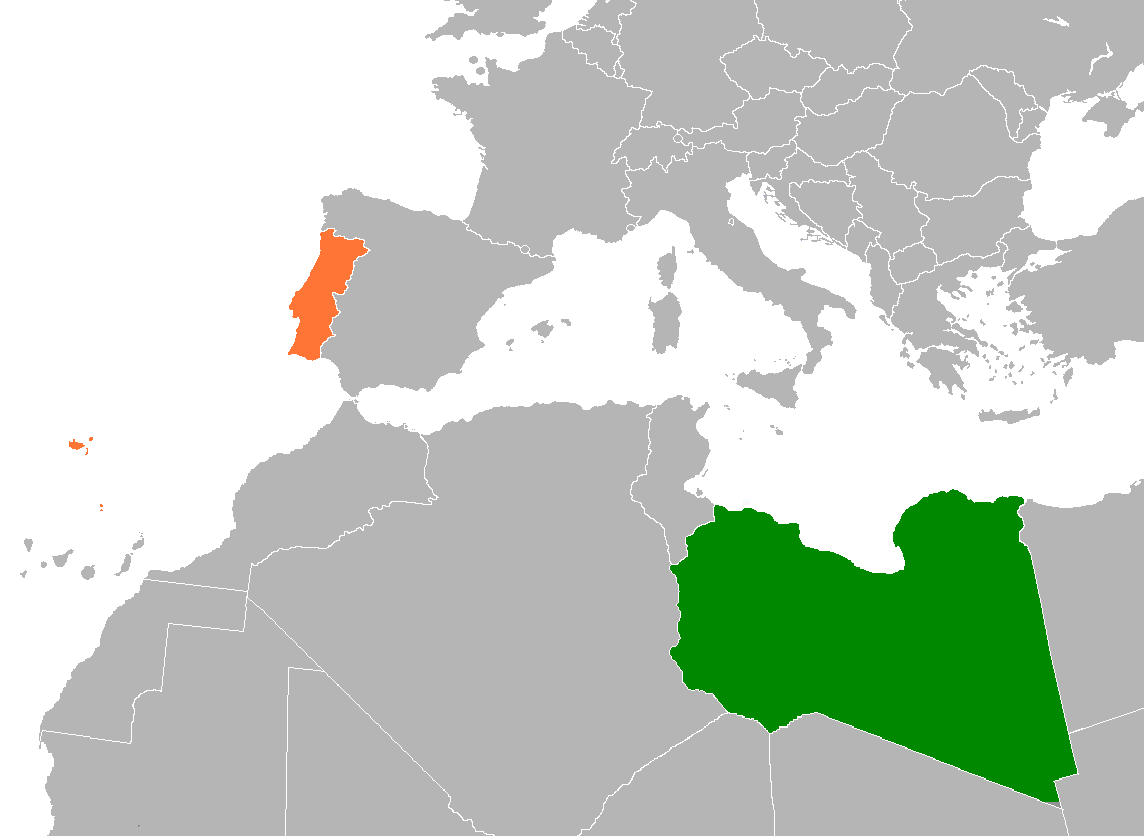

- Libya: Portugal

Libya–Portugal relations are the bilateral relations between Libya and Portuguese Republic. The two countries are members of the United Nations.

== History ==
=== From antiquity to 1900 ===
The present-day areas of Libya and Portugal were part of the trade routes of the Phoenicians, who lived here between the 10th and 4th centuries BC. BC also maintained their own bases. Later, both areas belonged to the Roman Empire as Libya superior and Libya inferior (Libya) or as the province of Lusitania and the province of Hispania ulterior (Portugal) . At the beginning of the 5th century, the Vandals invaded Portugal and ruled there for some time. They then moved on to North Africa until they captured Libya in 450.

From 641 onwards, Arabs conquered what is now Libya and in 711 what is now Portugal. Both areas then belonged to the Arab Empire until Portugal became an independent kingdom during its Reconquista in 1139. Since the late 15th century, the corsairs of Tripoli expanded their pirate attacks to further and further areas of the Mediterranean and into the Atlantic. They also regularly attacked Portuguese towns and ships of the Portuguese Navy and merchant fleet. In doing so, they also hindered the trade routes of the Portuguese Empire, as well as those of the emerging maritime powers Spain and England. Spain finally conquered Tripoli in 1510 and gave the city to the Order of St. John in 1530 . The Portuguese, who traditionally played an important role in the Order of St. John, also worked there. In 1551 the Ottomans conquered Libya. Tripoli remained a stronghold of the corsairs, who, in addition to Portugal and Spain, caused problems especially for the new sea powers France, the Netherlands and England until the early 19th century. However, the activities of the Libyan corsairs had declined since the bombardment of Tripoli (1728) and finally came to a complete standstill at the beginning of the 19th century.

=== From 1900 ===
From 1911 Libya became an Italian colony, after the Second World War (1939–1945) it came under British occupation and became independent as the Kingdom of Libya in 1951 . In 1969, the officer Muammar al-Gaddafi came to power in a bloodless coup and transformed the country into an Arab socialist state. The semi-fascist Estado Novo regime in Portugal, which had been established since 1932, did not enter into any relations with Libya.

Only after the fall of the dictatorship as a result of the Carnation Revolution in 1974 did Portugal's foreign policy undergo a realignment. In 1975, Libya and Portugal established diplomatic relations.

On November 3, 1976, both states signed a cultural agreement, a trade agreement and an agreement on economic, scientific and technical cooperation in the Portuguese capital Lisbon. A representative of Portugal was accredited for the first time in the Libyan capital Tripoli on April 4, 1989, but Portugal has not yet opened its own embassy there. On June 14, 2003, Libya and Portugal signed a mutual investment protection and promotion agreement in Sirte, followed on December 9, 2007, in Lisbon by an agreement on economic cooperation and a cooperation agreement in the areas of education, science, technology, higher education, language, culture, youth, sports and media. On August 3, 2007, Portugal opened its own embassy in Tripoli for the first time. In the wake of the Arab Spring, there were also mass protests in Libya, which ultimately led to the civil war in Libya in 2011 . NATO, of which Portugal is a founding member, was then a key force in the military intervention in Libya in 2011 . However, Portugal did not participate directly.

On July 28, 2011, Portugal recognized the National Transitional Council. In connection with the civil war in Libya since 2014, Portugal left its embassy in Tripoli vacant from April 4, 2014, and since then Portugal's ambassador to Tunisia has represented Portuguese interests in Libya.

== Trade ==
Bilateral trade is still comparatively low, but since the decline in the exchange of goods as a result of the civil war in Libya in 2011, trade has now started to grow again. In 2016, the trade volume between Libya and Portugal amounted to 36.6 million euros (2012: 420.4 million), with a trade balance surplus in favor of Portugal of 34.0 million euros (2012: 377.6 million). This placed Libya in 88th place as a buyer and 143rd as a supplier in Portuguese foreign trade, while Portugal was in 41st place as a buyer and 32nd as a supplier in Libya's foreign trade. 43 Portuguese companies exported to Libya in 2016 (2012: 110).

In 2016, Portugal exported goods worth 35.3 million euros to Libya ( 2015 : 19.6 million, 2014 : 24.4 million; 2013 : 49.6 million; 2012 : 21.4 million), Of these, 74.1% were machinery and equipment, 11.4% were chemical-pharmaceutical products, 7.3% were foodstuffs, 2.3% were agricultural products and 2.0% were metal goods. During the same period, Libya delivered goods worth 1.3 million euros to Portugal (2015: 8.4 million, 2014: 1.2 million; 2013: 104.3 million; 2012 : 399.0 million), of which 60% are chemical-pharmaceutical products, 39.9% metal goods, and 0.1% paper and cellulose. The Portuguese Chamber of Foreign Trade AICEP maintains a contact office at the Portuguese Embassy in the Libyan capital Tripoli, and there is also a department for Libya in the Arab-Portuguese Chamber of Commerce in Lisbon, the Câmara de Comércio e Indústria Àrabe Portuguesa.

== Sports ==
The Libyan and Portuguese national football teams have not yet met (as of February 2020).

Libyan players also occasionally play for Portuguese clubs, including internationals such as Jamal Mohammed, who has played for several teams in Portugal.

== Resident diplomatic missions ==
- Libya has an embassy in Lisbon.
- Portugal is accredited to Libya from its embassy in Tunis.
