= Libyan refugees =

Refugees of the 2011 Libyan Crisis

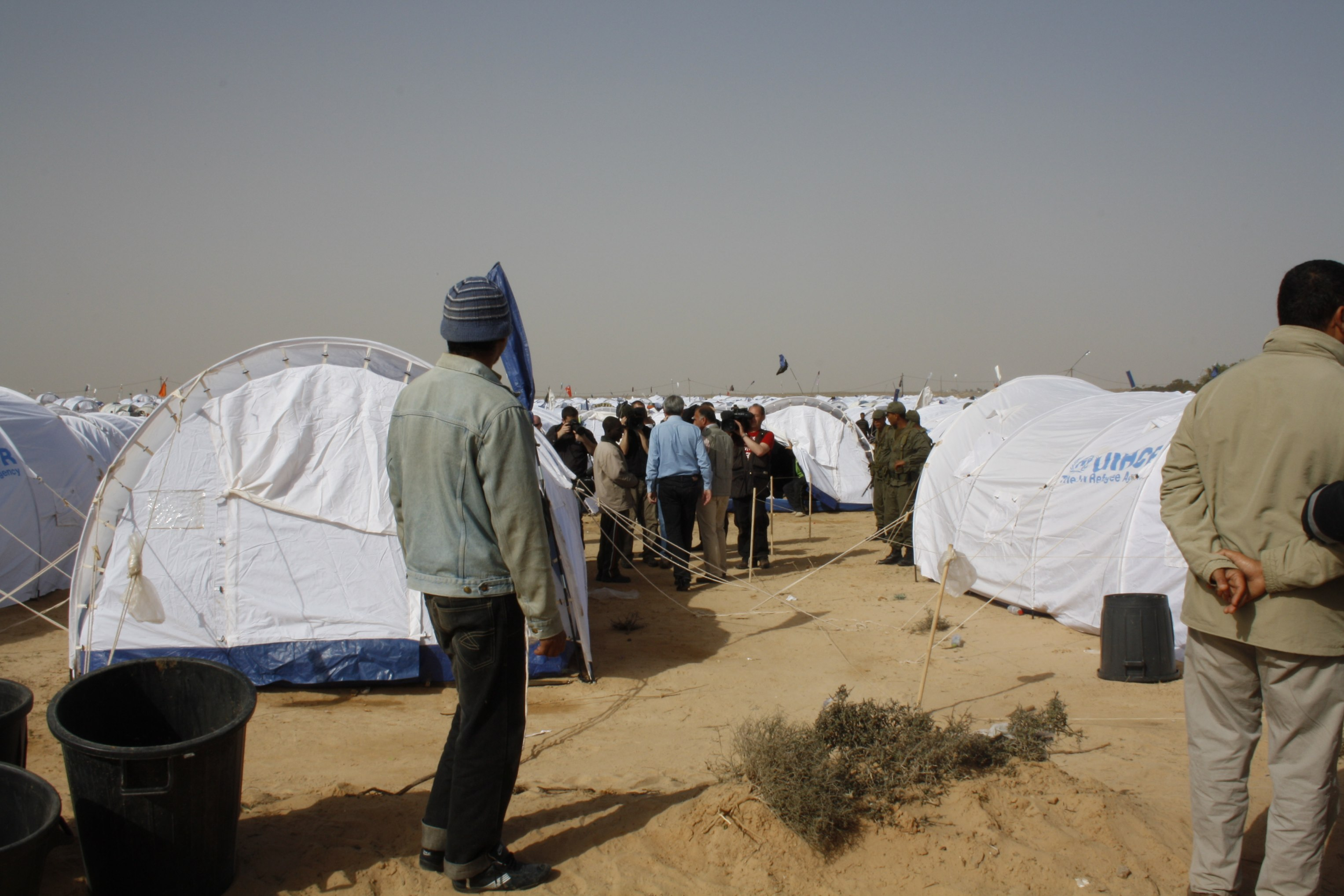
Transit camp for refugees near the Libyan-Tunisian border in March 2011

Libyan refugees are people who fled or were expelled from their homes since the beginning of the Libyan Crisis in 2011, including during the First Libyan Civil War, that deposed Muammar Gaddafi in 2011, and the Second Libyan Civil War (2014–2020). Many people have been displaced from Libya to neighbouring Tunisia, Egypt and Chad, as well as to European countries across the Mediterranean. The majority of refugees from Libya are Arabs, though many others are sub-Saharan African migrants who were living in Libya. These groups were also among the first refugee waves to exit the country. The total number of Libyan refugees was estimated at around 1 million in June 2011, with most returning to Libya after the First Civil War ended. In January 2013, there were 5,252 refugees originating from Libya alongside 59,425 internally displaced persons registered by the UNHCR.

According to a May 2014 Le Monde article, there were between 600,000 and 1,000,000 Libyan refugees in Tunisia, many of which were political opponents of Libya's post Gaddafi government, including many supporters of Gaddafi. This represented between 10 and 15% of the Libya's pre-2011 Civil War population. In August 2014, Tunisian President Moncef Marzouki stated that two million Libyans, or one third of the pre-2011 population had taken refuge in Tunisia.

== History ==
=== Exodus caused by the First Libyan Civil War (2011) ===
Fleeing the violence of Tripoli by road, as many as 4,000 refugees were crossing the Libya–Tunisia border daily during the first days of the 2011 civil war. Among those escaping the violence were native Libyans as well as foreign nationals including Egyptians, Tunisians and Turks.

By 1 March 2011, officials from the UN High Commissioner for Refugees had confirmed allegations of discrimination against sub-Saharan Africans who were held in dangerous conditions in the no-man's-land between Tunisia and Libya. On 10 May 2011, The Week posted an article claiming that roughly 746,000 people have fled Libya since the war began.

A provisional refugee camp was set up at Ras Ajdir on the Libyan-Tunisian border and had a capacity for 10,000, but was overflowing with an estimated 20,000 to 30,000 refugees. By 3 March 2011, the situation there was described as a logistical nightmare, with the World Health Organization warning of the risk of epidemics. To continue responding to the needs of people staying at the Ras Ajdir crossing point in Tunisia, the WFP and Secours Islamique-France upgraded a kitchen that would provide breakfast for families. Separately, the ICRC advised it was handing over its operations at the Choucha Camp to the Tunisian Red Crescent. Since 24 March 2011, the WFP supplied over 42,500 cooked meals for TCNs at the Sallum border. A total of 1,650 cartons of fortified date bars (equivalent of 13.2 metric tons) had also been provided to supplement these meals.

Over 500 mostly Berber Libyans fled their homes in Libya's Nafusa Mountains and took shelter in the Dehiba area of southeastern Tunisia between 5 and 12 April 2011.

The Sunday Telegraph reported on 11 September that almost the entire population of Tawergha, a town of about 10,000 people, had been forced to flee their homes by anti-Gaddafi fighters after their takeover of the settlement. The report suggested that Tawergha, which was dominated by black Libyans, may have been the subject of an ethnic cleansing provoked by a combination of racism and bitterness on the part of Misratan fighters over the Tawergha's support for Gaddafi during the siege of Misrata.

On 1 October 2011, Red Cross official Abdelhamid al-Mendi said that more than 50,000 Libyans had fled their homes in Benghazi since the war began in February.

=== After the First Libyan Civil War ===
As of January 2013, there were 5,252 refugees originating from Libya alongside 59,425 internally displaced persons. However the Le Monde article of 14 May 2014 stated that "Estimates of their numbers vary between 600,000 and one million by the Tunisian Ministry of Interior. If we add those, many also settled in Egypt, they would be nearly two million Libyans today outside the borders of a total population estimated at just over six million inhabitants."

Benghazi is the area that hosts the largest share of identified IDPs, with 115,000 IDPs residing there, which as a group account for (27.6%) of all IDPs in Libya. It is followed by Ajdabiya with 31,750 of IDPs (7.6%), Bayda with 21,500 IDPs (5.2%), Abu Salim with 21,475 IDPs (5.1%), Bani Waled with 20,000 IDPs (4.8%), Alzintan with 19,425 IDPs (4.7%), Tobruk with 16,375 (3.9%), Al Ajaylat with 13,500 IDPs (3.2%), Janzour with 10,105 IDP (2.4%), Sabha with 7,215 (1.7%), and Tarhuna with 7,150 IDPs (1.7%). Combined, these 10 locations account for 67.9% of the total identified IDP population. The 31 areas shown in the table below jointly host 87.1 % of the total identified IDP population.

=== Refugees of the Second Libyan Civil War (2014–2020) ===
Some sources estimate that nearly a third of Libya's population, some two million Libyans, has fled to Tunisia as refugees during the Second Libyan Civil War, including Tunisian President Moncef Marzouki. 435,000 Libyans have been forced to leave their homes, according to the World Food Programme.

On 30 July 2014, Tunisian Foreign Minister Mongi Hamdi said that the country cannot cope with the high number of refugees arriving from Libya due to the renewed civil war. He stated "Our country's economic situation is precarious, and we cannot cope with hundreds of thousands of refugees," and added that Tunisia will close its borders if necessary. Many of the Egyptians living in Libya have also been made refugees due to the conflict, and in August 2014 Algeria opened their border and offered special visas to fleeing Egyptians, allowing them to return to Egypt through the country.

== Immigration to Europe ==
Following the 2011 revolution in Tunisia and the civil war in Libya, the Italian island of Lampedusa saw a boom irregular arrivals of refugees from those countries. In February, Italian Foreign Minister Frattini expressed his concerns that the amount of Libyan refugees trying to reach Italy might reach between 200,000 and 300,000 people. More than 45,000 refugees arrived on Lampedusa in the first five months of 2011.

== See also ==
- Humanitarian situation during the Libyan civil war (2011)
