= Arab refugee camps =

Arab refugee camps may refer to:

- Lampedusa immigrant reception center on the Italian island of Lampedusa
- Palestinian refugee camps
- Syrian refugee camps in Turkey, Lebanon, Jordan and Iraqi Kurdistan
- Libyan transitional camps in Tunisia, Egypt and Chad
- Sahrawi refugee camps in Tindouf Province, Algeria
