= Foreign policy of Donald Trump =

Foreign policy of Donald Trump may refer to:

- The foreign policy of Donald Trump during the 2016 presidential election
- The foreign policy of the first Trump administration (2017–2021)
- The foreign policy of the second Trump administration (2025–present)

== See also ==
- Donroe Doctrine
