= Rouslen Hammami Attouchi =

Tunisian inventor

- Attouchi in 2021
- Born: 26 October 1996 (age 30); Menzel Bouzelfa, Tunisia
- Occupations: Electrical engineer, inventor

Rouslen Hammami Attouchi (born 26 October 1996) is a Tunisian electrical engineer, inventor and humanitarian volunteer. He attracted public attention in Tunisia for developing a compressed-air vehicle while finalizing his end-of-studies project at the National Engineering School of Tunis (ENIT). He has also been involved in humanitarian activities with the Tunisian Red Crescent.

== Early life and education ==
Rouslen Hammami Attouchi was born on 26 October 1996 in Menzel Bouzelfa, Nabeul Governorate, Tunisia.

His end-of-studies project at ENIT was titled Design of a Pneumatic Vehicle. The University of Tunis El Manar material identifies Rouslen Hammami Attouchi as the project presenter and lists AKER Services as the host organization.

== Compressed-air vehicle ==
Rouslen Hammami Attouchi with the compressed-air vehicle

Hammami Attouchi attracted public attention in Tunisia for developing a small vehicle powered primarily by compressed air. The invention was a three-wheeled vehicle designed to use compressed air as its principal source of propulsion. Tunis Afrique Presse and other Tunisian media reported that the vehicle can approximately 40 km/h. According to media reports, the project took approximately four and a half months to develop, primarily relying on used components. The vehicle was presented as a low-cost project, Tunisian Media cites that the project costed approximately 2000 Tunisian Dinars, and intended to explore an alternative approach to transportation.

The vehicle was developed with environmental considerations in mind. Tunis Afrique Presse reported that Rouslen Hammami Attouchi aimed to reduce toxic-gas emissions from transportation and described his use of photovoltaic electricity to operate the compressor used to fill the vehicle's compressed-air reservoir. University of Tunis El Manar material associated with the project mention that the primarily goals reducing are greenhouse-gas impacts, saving energy and reducing transportation costs. The project received coverage from several Tunisian publications, including WMC, Tunis Afrique Presse, Kapitalis and Réalités.

Afrik-Jeunes described the project as the first compressed-air vehicle in Tunisia, attributing the characterization to Rouslen Hammami Attouchi's presentation through Tunis Afrique Presse. The project was also featured in a report broadcast on Tunisia's public national television channel, Al Wataniya 1 and covered from regional media, including A24 News Agency and Alaraby TV.. The project was also referenced in a doctoral thesis submitted at the University of Toulouse – Jean Jaurès in France.

== Humanitarian work ==
Rouslen Hammami Attouchi volunteers for the Tunisian Red Crescent, where he served as secretary-general of the local committee. During the COVID-19 pandemic, he participated in public-awareness activities organized by the committee to raise awareness of health-protocol requirements and assist residents who needed help registering for COVID-19 vaccination..In 2026, the Nabeul Regional Committee of the Tunisian Red Crescent reported that he led a workshop in Menzel Bouzelfa on the fundamental principles of the Red Crescent Movement, international humanitarian law and the Geneva Conventions.

== See also ==
- Compressed-air vehicle
- National Engineering School of Tunis
- Tunisian Red Crescent
