= Racism in Libya =

Libya is a predominantly Arab country that has traditionally held extremely racist views towards black-skinned, sub-Saharan Africans (although Libya does have indigenous Black populations including the Black Arabs and Black Berbers). The New York Times argues that Libya has a "long history of racist violence being reported."

Black Africans were victims of chattel slavery in Libya until the 20th century. In the 21st century, a significant number of sub-Saharan Africans came to Libya, primarily to work as unskilled laborers. In recent years, a number of racist incidents targeting Black migrants have been reported. According to Peter Bouckaert of Human Rights Watch, the incidents targeting migrants and refugees reflect "a deep-seated racism and anti-African sentiment in Libyan society."

During the Battle of Tawergha, rebel slogans like "the brigade for purging slaves, black skin" were scrawled on the road between Misrata and Tawergha.

== See also ==
- Racism by country
- Racism in the Middle East
- Slavery in Libya
