= Libya–Tunisia border =

International border

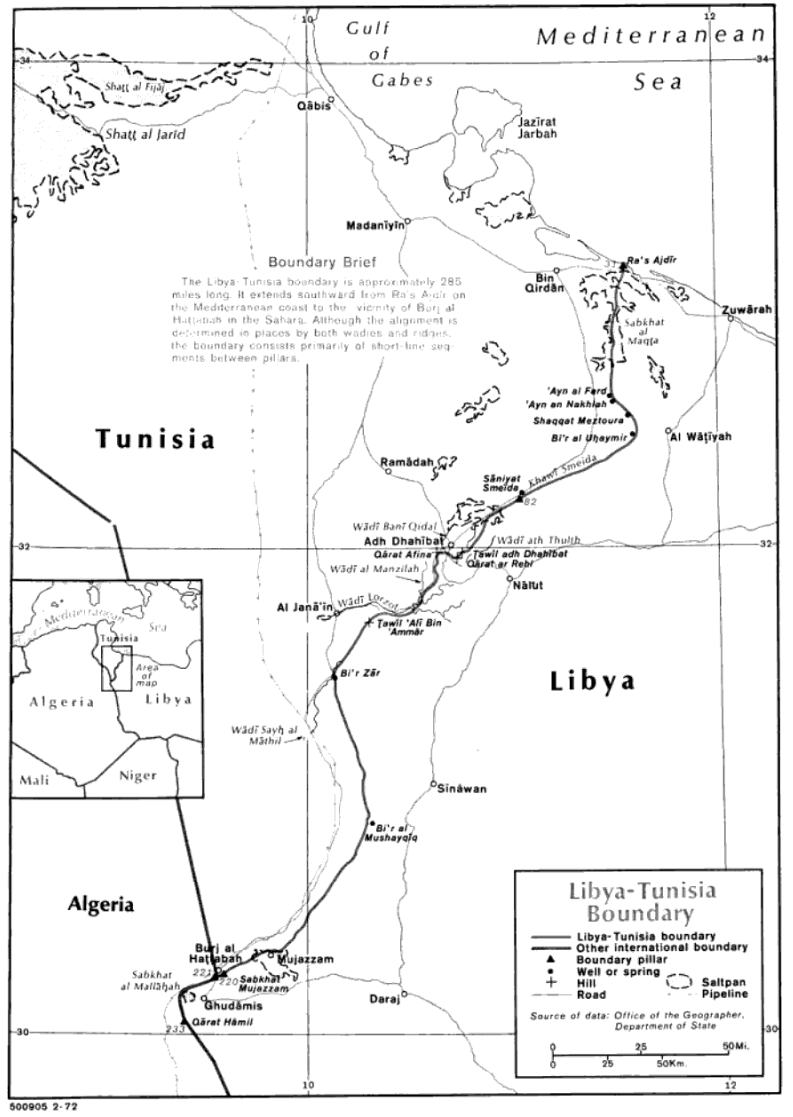
Map of the Libya-Tunisia border

The Libya–Tunisia border is 461 km (286 mi) in length and runs from the Mediterranean Sea in the north to the tripoint with Algeria in the south.

== Description ==
The border starts in the north on the Mediterranean coast at Ras Ajdir, proceeding overland southwards and then south-westwards via a series of irregular lines down to the tripoint with Algeria.

== Current Situation ==
Good governance in southeastern Tunisia is a difficult objective to achieve. The current security and economic situation, with the two countries extremely closely linked, is the result of organized exclusion from the cross-border region.

== History ==
For most of the 19th century both Tunisia and the coastal regions of modern Libya (organised as the Vilayet of Tripolitania were part of the Ottoman Empire, though with a large degree of de facto autonomy. France occupied Tunisia in 1881 and created a protectorate. France and the Ottomans established a border on the coast between Tunisia and Tripolitania in 1886, which was then extended southwards down to the vicinity of Ghadames in 1892. A treaty of 19 May 1910 then delimited the border in greater detail and was then demarcated on the ground with pillars in 1910–11.

In September 1911 Italy invaded Tripolitania, and the Treaty of Ouchy was signed the following year by which the Ottomans formally ceded sovereignty of the area over to Italy. Italy organised the newly conquered regions into the colonies of Italian Cyrenaica and Italian Tripolitania and gradually began pushing further south; in 1934 they united the two territories as Italian Libya.

During the North African Campaign of the Second World War Italy was defeated and its African colonies were occupied by the Allied powers, with Libya split into British and French zones of occupation. Libya was later granted full independence on 2 December 1951. France granted Tunisia independence in 1956, and the border then became one between two sovereign states.

In 2011 Libyan dictator Muammar Gaddafi was overthrown in a short civil war, which occasionally spilled over into Tunisian territory, as well as resulting in thousands of refugees crossing the border. The border remains insecure owing to the ongoing civil war in Libya.

In March 2023, Tunisian President Kaïs Saïed denounced the Libyan offshore field. Kais Saied laments that Tunisia has only received "crumbs from Bouri", while a fair sharing of its revenues could "meet all Tunisia's needs and more". And this, while the dispute around the maritime border area between Libya and Tunisia was decided in favor of Libya by the International Court of Justice (ICJ) in 1982. A decision confirmed in 1985 by the same organizational body..

Currently, there are no new discussions between the stakeholders on the final demarcation of the border between Tunisia and Libya.

== Settlements near the border ==
=== Libya ===
- El Assa
- Wazzin

=== Tunisia ===
- Alouet el Gouna
- Dehiba

== See also ==
- Libya–Tunisia relations
