= El Assa Airfield =

Abandoned World War II airfield in Libya

El Assa Airfield El Assa Flugplatz

Site information
- Type: Military airfield
- Controlled by: German Luftwaffe; United States Army Air Forces

Location
- Location of El Assa Airfield, Libya
- Coordinates: 32°49′56″N 011°35′58″E

Site history
- Built: 1941
- In use: 1941-1943

El Assa Airfield is an abandoned World War II military airfield located in the district of Nuqat al Khams, Libya. It is about 140 km west of Tripoli near the Tunisian border.

The facility was built either by the Italian Regia Aeronautica or German Luftwaffe about 1941. After the seizure of the area by the British Eighth Army during the Western Desert Campaign in early 1943, it was used by the Ninth Air Force of the United States Army Air Force's 83d Bombardment Squadron (12th Bombardment Group) between 3 March and 4 April 1943. The 83d flew B-25 Mitchell medium bombers from the airfield.

The airfield was most likely constructed from compacted sand, with tents used as support facilities. Today, it is unrecognizable, being taken over by the desert.
