= Libya–Tunisia relations =

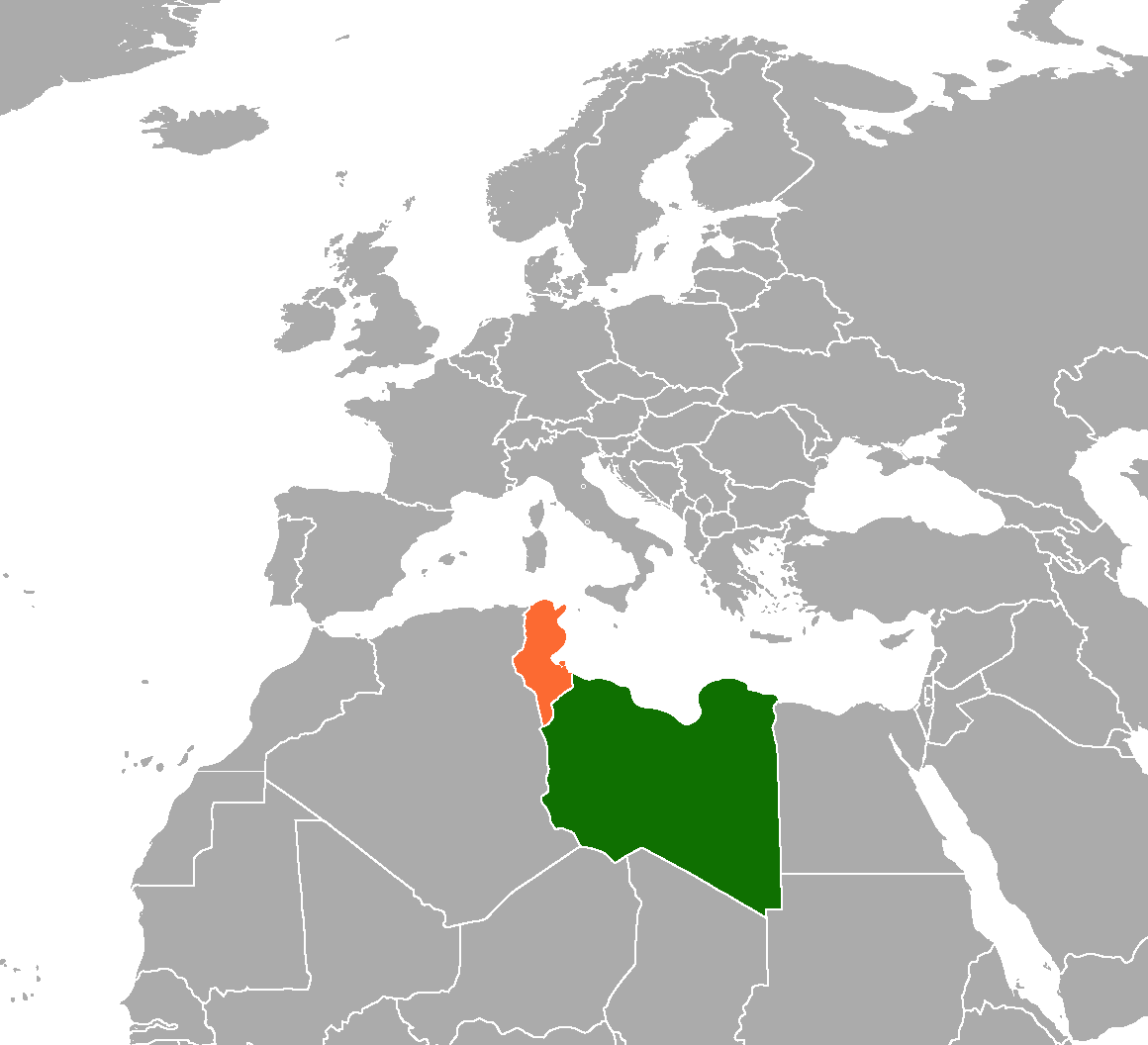

- Libya: Tunisia

Libya–Tunisia relations are longstanding between the two neighbouring North African Maghreb states, Libya and Tunisia.

Being the two neighboring Maghreb nations, the relationship between the two is friendly but sometimes rocky. Tunisia is known to have some issues with Libya including political differences.

Libya has an embassy in Tunis and consulate general in Sfax, and Tunisia has an embassy in Tripoli and consulate general in Benghazi. Both countries are members of the Organisation of Islamic Cooperation, African Union, Arab League, Arab Maghreb Union and Non-Aligned Movement.

== History ==
Ever since Carthage started expanding into the Mediterranean, Tunisia has held control over Tripolitania (modern-day north western Libya) for centuries under various dynasties and kingdoms who kept the region under their control. Both Tunisia and Libya were Islamized and Arabized upon the Muslim conquest of the Maghreb and were part of various emirates and Caliphates that ruled the region, such as the Aghlabids, Fatimids, Zirids and the Hafsids. In the 16th century, they were absorbed into the Ottoman Empire as two distinct provinces until the Scramble for Africa began when France and Italy acquired control over them.

In the 1950s, both countries gained independence and established relations when Libyan King Idris and Tunisian King Muhammad VIII al-Amin were the representatives for each country, respectively.

=== Recent event ===
In April 2025, for the first time Tunisia and Libya examined aspects of common bilateral consular cooperation concerning the communities of the two countries, the organization of cross-border movements and the management of problems of citizens of the two countries, and notably signed agreements providing.

Massad Boulos, Senior U.S. Advisor for Arab and African Affairs, welcomed the agreement reached in August 2026 in Tunis—under UN auspices—between the conflicting Libyan political parties. Boulos stated, "We welcome the progress made by the Libyan parties in Tunis toward an agreement on electoral laws and the High National Elections Commission—an important step toward a credible path to successful national elections".

== Libyan Civil War ==
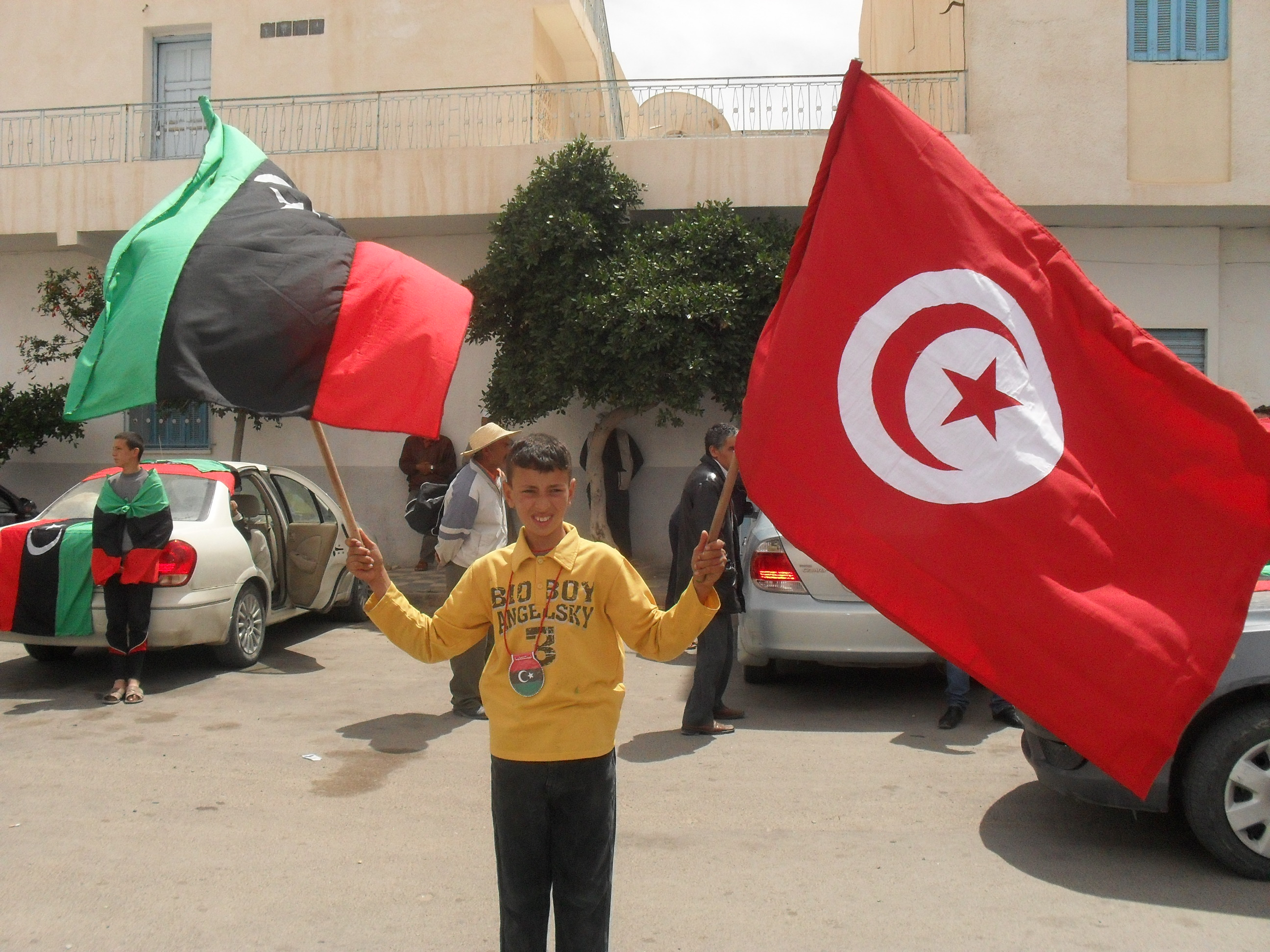
Libyans taking refuge in Tataouine, Tunisia during the Libyan Civil War.

Tunisia, where the Arab Spring began, later spread into Libya and overthrew the regimes of both countries; however, the 2011 Libyan unrest had gone out of control after the death of Muammar Gaddafi caused the later second Libyan unrest which the growing Islamists tried to take control, Tunisia has been caught at the amidst of the conflict in Libya between the Tobruk-based Representatives and the Tripoli-based National Congress.

Tunisia's relations with Libya have been characterized as rocky, since the Ennahda Movement party of the Tunisian government has shown to be sympathetic with Islamists ruling Tripoli (Government of National Accord), thus causing a drift between the two nations. However, the official Tunisian diplomatic stance is to remain neutral in the affairs of other Maghreb nations.

Nonetheless, Tunisia has been a critical supporter for reconciliation between the two government factions in Libya, alongside Egypt and Algeria. Tunisia also kept its borders open for Libyan and International refugees fleeing the war, accepting over two million Libyan citizens into the country in 2015.

== Border ==
The two countries share 460 km of border, designated by the Tunisian MoD as buffer zones with specified coordinates, special authorization is required to enter these zones.

Tunisia constructed a defensive line alongside its borders with Libya, a physical barrier composed of a system of obstacles, including sandbags protecting water-filled trenches dug about 2 meters deep, elevated observation towers, and fences. With the assistance of Germany and the US, Tunisia installed an electronic security surveillance along its completed barrier that spans almost half of the border's length, the surveillance system comprises unmanned aerial vehicle (UAV) systems which are used to complement the camera-based security surveillance system. The remaining half of the borders south of Dehiba consists of a vast ocean of sand dunes which are monitored by Tunisian Army's GTS "(in French): Groupement Territorial Saharien", an army corps specialized in the Saharan environment, supported by aerial reconnaissance.

In August 2023, Tunisia and Libya reached a cooperation agreement to share the reception of sub-Saharan African migrants stranded at the border between the two countries.

In March 2025, at least fifty Tunisians were arrested in Libya, however Tunisia and Libya reached a common agreement.

== See also ==
- Foreign relations of Libya
- Foreign relations of Tunisia
