= Battle of Tawergha =

Battle of the 2011 Libyan Civil War

Coordinates: 31.9847°N 15.0458°E

- Part of Battle of the Misrata frontline
Date	11–13 August 2011
Location	Tawergha, Libya
Result	Anti-Gaddafi victory Ethnic cleansing of Tawergha

Belligerents
(Libya) Anti-Gaddafi forces: National Liberation Army; (United Nations) UNSC forces: NATO air forces	(Libya) Gaddafi loyalists: Libyan Army

Commanders and leaders
(Libya) Ibrahim Halbus (Libya) Abdul Hassan (Libya) Ali Ahmed al Sheh	Unknown

Strength
Al Horia Brigade; 6 tanks	800 fighters

Casualties and losses
15 killed, 85+ wounded 1 tank T-55 destroyed	4 killed, at least 60 claimed captured 2 technicals, 1 Shilka destroyed (NATO claim)

The Battle of Tawergha was a military engagement of the Libyan Civil War that began on 11 August 2011 when anti-Gaddafi forces based in Misrata advanced southeast along the road to Sirte in the early morning and attacked Libyan Army positions in the town of Tawergha. It ended on 13 August when rebel troops, after capturing the town, cleared it of snipers and artillery positions threatening Misrata.

== Battle ==
On 11 August, rebel forces, including 3–6 tanks, advanced on Tawergha from the south and east. Al-Jazeera described the offensive as "a heavily co-ordinated operation with NATO", which reportedly carried out air strikes against loyalist forces in support of the rebels.

After nearly two full days of fighting, the rebels claimed victory late on 12 August. One fighter reported that although the battle had been very intense initially, many loyalist soldiers eventually fled. On 13 August, low-level fighting reportedly continued in Tawergha's old quarter as opposition troops attempted to flush out loyalist snipers and other holdouts. According to an Al-Jazeera reporter who witnessed the events, one rebel commander was shot dead while trying to negotiate the holdouts' surrender. Ali Ahmed al Sheh, a rebel commander, claimed that Gaddafi-loyal soldiers used civilians as human shields, preventing his forces from using heavy machine guns and slowing the offensive down.

On 13 August, Gaddafi's Deputy Foreign Minister Khaled Kaim stated that the rebel assault on Tawergha had failed, saying tribesmen from Bani Walid had rallied to the fight the previous evening and pushed rebel forces all the way back to Misrata. This claim was not independently verified. The rebels themselves claimed that they were closing in on the last sniper and pro-Gaddafi artillery positions in the town. By the end of the day, a spokesperson for the National Transitional Council said Tawergha had been secured. Twelve anti-Gaddafi fighters were killed during the operation, Commander Ibrahim Halbus told BBC News.

== Aftermath ==
Rebels reportedly advanced to positions beyond the town, taking a bridge on the highway linking it to Sirte. The city of Misrata was reportedly relieved of the heavy missile bombardment which had been directed against its population.

On 17 August, rebels stated that they had advanced further and reached the outskirts of Al Hayshah, north of a major crossroads.

On 18 August, rebels claimed to have found a mass grave consisting of 150 civilians executed by Gaddafi's forces near Tawergha.

On 19 August, three rebels were killed in fighting around Tawergha.

A report published in The Sunday Telegraph on 11 September claimed that the town had been the target of ethnic cleansing on the part of the Misrata Brigade, with virtually the entire population of the town forced to leave after its takeover by anti-Gaddafi forces and a number of refugee camps crowded with Tawergha's former residents being subjected to raids and arbitrary arrests by opposition fighters. Ibrahim Halbus, one of the original commanders of the brigade during the battle, was quoted by reporter Andrew Gilligan as saying, "Tawergha no longer exists."
