= Al Hayshah =

Al Hayshah El Hissa, Al Hishah, El Hescia
- Town
- Location in Libya
- Coordinates: 31°38′45″N 015°17′03″E
- Country: Libya
- Region: Tripolitania
- District: Misrata
- Elevation: 5 m (16 ft)
- Time zone: UTC+2 (EET)

Al Hayshah is a coastal town in the Misrata District in the Tripolitanian region of northeastern Libya. It is located 19 kilometres (12 mi) from the Mediterranean Sea, on the Wadi Umm el Algian, 31 kilometres (19 mi) north-northeast of Al Qaddāḩīyah (Gheddahia), next to the Hayshah salt flats.

From independence in 1951 to 1983 Al Hayshah was part of the Misrata Governorate. From 1987 to 1995 it was part of the Sawfajjin baladiyah. From 1995 to 2001 it is unclear which district administered Al Hayshah. It was part of the revised Sirte District from 2001 to 2007, but was incorporated into the enlarged Misrata District in 2007.
