= Tunis Afrique Presse =

Tunisian news agency

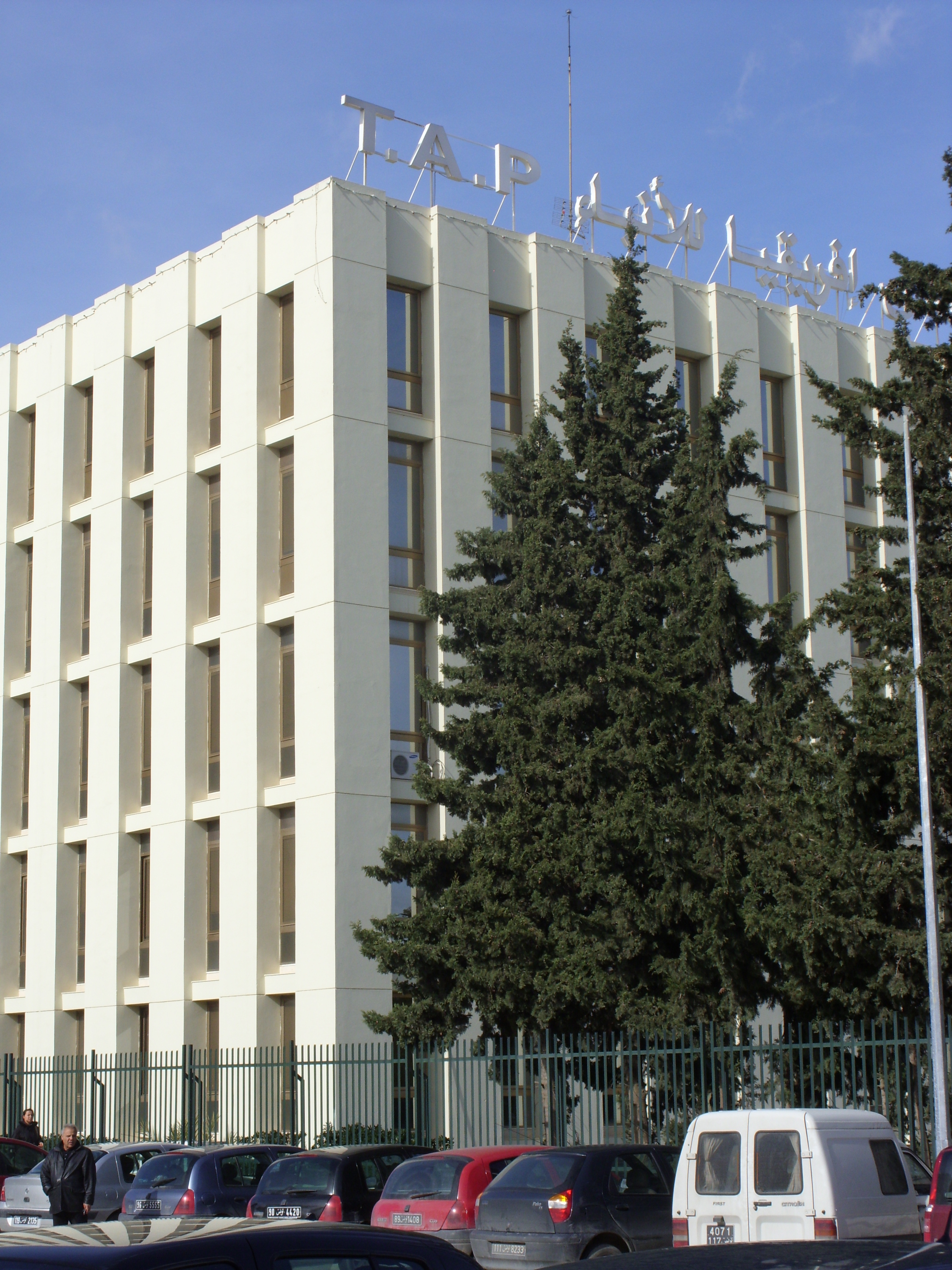
- TAP headquarters
- Industry: News media
- Founded: 1 January 1961; 65 years ago
- Headquarters: Tunis, Tunisia
- Key people: Kamel Ben Younes (CEO)
- Products: Wire service
- Number of employees: 300
- Website: tap.info.tn

Tunis Afrique Presse (TAP) (Arabic: وكالة تونس إفريقيا للأنباء (وات)) is a Tunisian news agency.

== History and profile ==
The agency, based in Tunis, was founded on 1 January 1961. With a corps of 300 agents, including photographers, researchers and 220 journalists, and a network of correspondents covering all regions of the country, the agency reports on national news in Arabic, French, and English.

For international news, the agency uses AFP, Reuters, and the Associated Press, as well as about forty national agencies. Globally, the agency produces an average of 250 dispatches each day. The agency also has a photography department, which produces around 20 images daily, and has an archive of more than 500,000 photos dating back to the 1930s.

=== General managers ===
Hédi Annabi was the general manager of agency between 1979 and 1981. Néjib Ouerghi was appointed head of the agency on 12 May 2010, replacing Mohamed Missaoui in the post. He had previously spent his entire career at the daily La Presse de Tunisie, before becoming editor-in-chief of Le Renouveau until he joined TAP. Taieb Yousfi became the head of the agency on 7 January 2012.

== See also ==
- Federation of Arab News Agencies (FANA)
