= Tawergha =

Tawergha تاورغاء
- Ghost town
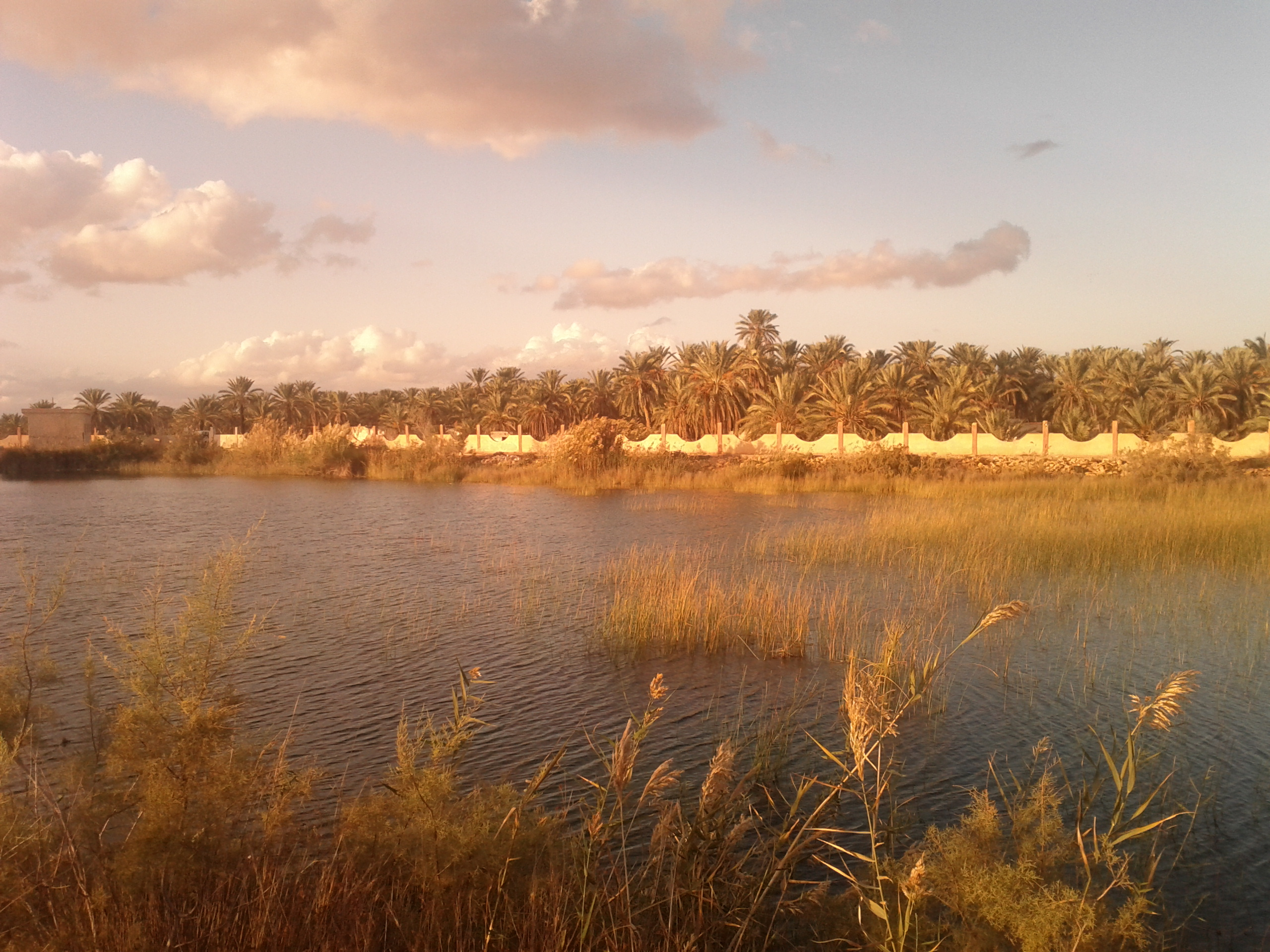

- Location in Libya
- Coordinates: 31°58′15″N 15°03′09″E
- Country: Libya
- Region: Tripolitania
- District: Misrata

Government
  - Mayor: Abulmoola Adouma

Population (2006)
  - Total: 24,223
- Time zone: UTC+02:00 (EET)

Tawergha (Berber: ⵜⴰⵡⴻⵔⵖⴰ, Arabic: تاورغاء), also transliterated Tawargha, Tawarga, Tauorga, Taworgha, Tawurgha or Torghae, is, as of May 2021, a former ghost town in Libya that is under administrative jurisdiction of the city of Misrata, which is 38 kilometers away. It was the site of intense fighting during the Libyan Civil War before it was captured and forcibly evacuated by anti-Gaddafi forces in August 2011.

By the end of the war in October 2011, the town was largely cleared of its population by NTC militias. During Libya's political transition period, members of the General National Congress reportedly indicated they would like to see Tawerghan refugees restored to their homes, but expressed concern over their safety. There have been numerous reports of militias acting outside the authority of the Tripoli-based government threatening Tawerghans who have attempted to return to Tawergha.

Tawergha means "the green island" in the Berber language.

== Economy ==
This city was famous for its palm trees which at one point were considered the true wealth of the city. The city also produced significant amounts of dates, including the Bersiel date, which is used as a component in ropes and other commodities. In pre-colonial times, tens of thousands of black-skinned slaves worked on plantations, making Tawergha the only town in coastal Libya with a black majority. In the colonial period, these people were nominally emancipated from slavery, but their economic status remained very low. In the Gaddafi period they were treated better; receiving full education and development. Many of its inhabitants achieved high positions in the army and civil service.

One aspect of the city that stood out was its husbandry of cattle and chickens, producing beef, dairy products and in particular eggs following investments made by HVA International from the Netherlands.

== History ==
=== Roman Period ===
During Roman times, Tawergha gained a lot of attention due to its position and the connection that it had to the sand route that connected the city of Sirte along the coast of the Mediterranean Sea to Egypt. Control of Tawergha helped the Romans coordinate control of Libya.

=== First Libyan civil war ===
Tawergha lies on the road from Sirte (Muammar Gaddafi's hometown) to the city of Misrata. As a result, during the Libyan Civil War, Tawergha was used as a centre of military operations against Misrata, which rose up against the Libyan Dictator Muammar Gaddafi in February 2011. During this time, Misratans accuse Tawerghans of leading the two-month siege of Misrata, as well as raping their women and cutting off the penises of their captured men.

When the Libyan army weakened, Tawergha became the first target for NTC Misratan brigades, although individuals suspected of being pro-Gaddafi had been the objective of revenge killings since February 2011. According to Amnesty International, anti-Gaddafi forces did not allow the population of Tawerga to flee. On 12 August, anti-Gaddafi forces claimed to have captured Tawergha.

British journalist Andrew Gilligan visited Tawergha in September 2011 and found it virtually emptied of its inhabitants, who numbered around 30,000 before the war. He reported that the Misrata Brigade, a semi-autonomous unit of the anti-Gaddafi National Liberation Army, had engaged in a campaign of ethnic cleansing in response to the town's alleged support of Gaddafi during the siege on their city. Many slogans he saw painted in and around Tawergha, as well as the accounts of anti-Gaddafi fighters and commanders whom he quoted, made reference to the dark pigmentation of many Tawergha citizens, with one sign referring to the Misrata Brigade as "the brigade for purging slaves [and] black skin". His report, published by The Sunday Telegraph on 11 September, quoted Ibrahim al-Halbous a brigade commander as saying, "Tawergha no longer exists, only Misrata" and another as asserting that the town's former residents will only return "over our dead bodies". In February 2012, Amnesty reported that Tawergha was empty and guarded against any returnees, with Misrata militiamen systematically destroying and burning down homes and infrastructure to avoid the return of Tawergha inhabitants. Militias from Misrata continue to hunt down and terrorize the displaced inhabitants of Tawergha across Libya. Hundreds have been illegally arrested and tortured by militiamen in Misrata. In May 2012, the UN Human Rights Council's Commission of Inquiry published a report about the violations conducted by Misratan militias against Tawerghans across Libya including killings, arbitrarily arrests and torture, calling it a war crime.

The nonprofit group Human Rights Watch reported in November 2013 that Tawerghans remain unable to return to their homes due to intimidation and violence by militias, most of which are based in Misrata, it said. The report claimed refugee camps for Tawerghans are often left without security and have been assaulted by small groups of armed men on multiple occasions, including at least twice in November 2013.

Residents of Tawergha were reportedly subjected to rapes and torture for supporting Gaddafi during the first civil war.

It became a ghost town after being ransacked by Misratans. According to Human Rights Watch about 40,000 people were displaced from Tawergha.

== Resettlement ==
The United Nations-backed Libyan government announced on 26 December 2017 that people displaced from the town would be allowed to go back home in February 2018. The deal came after a year of negotiations. The government added that it would also pay compensation to relatives of those killed or detained, as well as those who were wounded or whose homes were destroyed. However, the residents were prevented from returning home by a local militia in February 2018.

In June 2018, after the head of the Tawergha Local Council and the Mayor of Misrata signed a peace treaty that pro-Khalifa Haftar internally displaced people (IDPs) of Tawergha deemed as propaganda of the Muslim Brotherhood, the IDPs finally started resettling Tawergha without resistance from local militias. Despite the deals, most Tawergha IDPs have been unable to return as of January 2019 due to the mostly Misratan militias ravaging the town's infrastructure plus the IDPs feeling insecure according to Human Rights Watch. The police station of Tawergha was reopened in February 2019.

By August 2022, 45% of IDPs had returned to the town according to Marc-André Franche, Resident Representative of the United Nations Development Program (UNDP) in Libya. He also stated that the UNDP had invested over $2 million in its reconstruction.

== See also ==
- List of cities in Libya
- Racism in Libya
