= Choucha Refugee Camp =

Refugee camp in Tunisia

Coordinates: 33°08′24″N 11°27′40″W

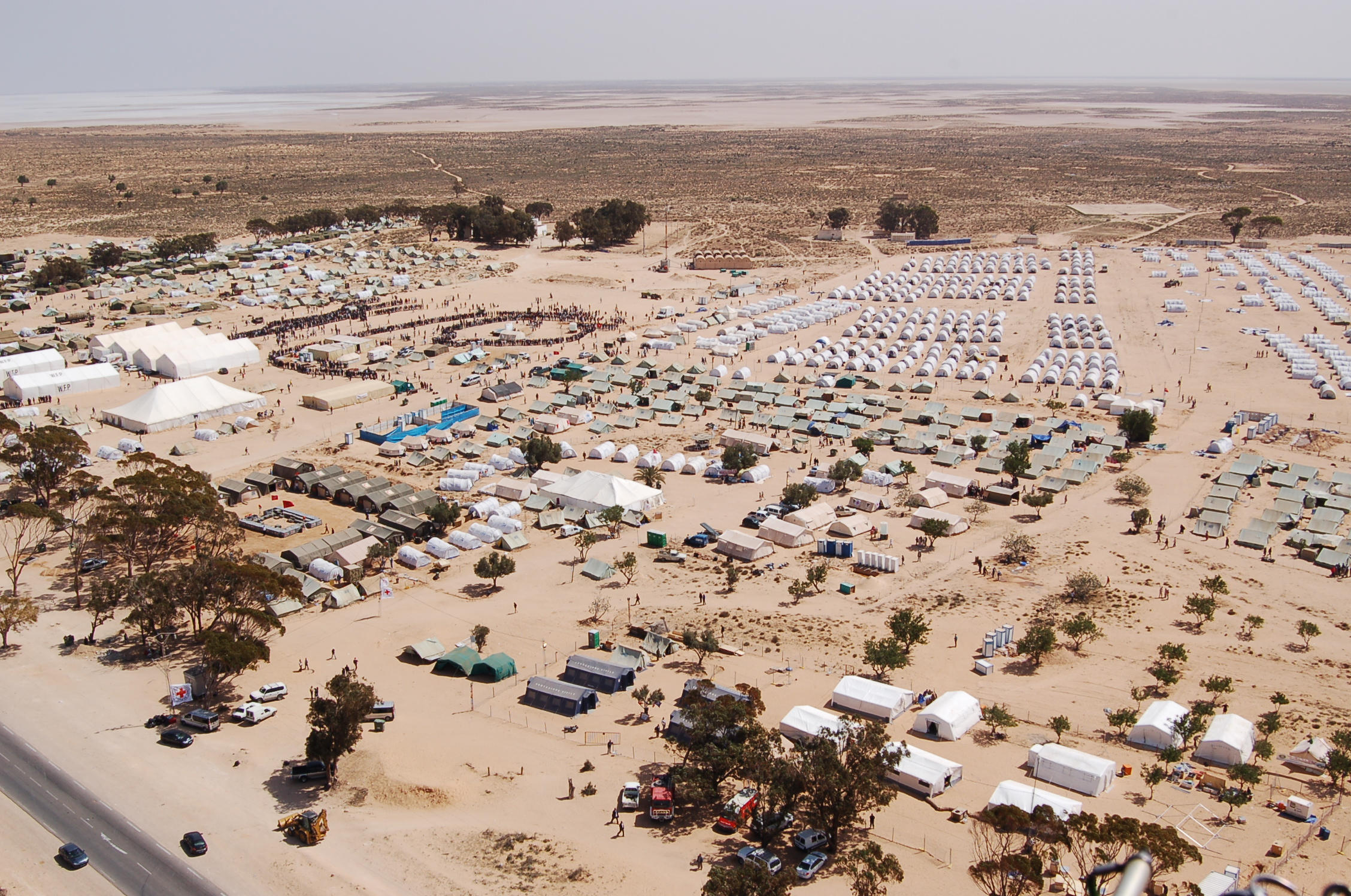
Aerial view of Choucha refugee camp

Choucha is a refugee camp in the south of Tunisia, in the Medinine Governorate. The camp is located within 10 kilometers of the border crossing Ras Ajdir with Libya. The camp was opened on the 24th of February, 2011 and run by the UNHCR, other NGOs and the Tunisian authorities. Choucha camp hosted mainly refugees who fled the conflict in Libya. The UNHCR officially closed the camp in 2013.

== Background ==
Location of Choucha refugee camp

In December 2010, the Jasmine Revolution in Tunisia started. This event sparked several uprisings in the Middle East and North Africa, also known as the Arab Spring. In February 2011 the revolution started in Libya as well, leading to a civil war in the country that is still ongoing. This created an influx of refugees from Libya into neighboring Tunisia. In response to this influx, the Tunisian authorities together with the UNHCR and other organisations opened seven refugee camps in the border region near Choucha. Choucha camp would become the biggest of these seven. The UNCHR states that the camp welcomed up to 18.000 people a day when the conflict in Libya escalated.

== Actors in camp ==
=== Residents ===
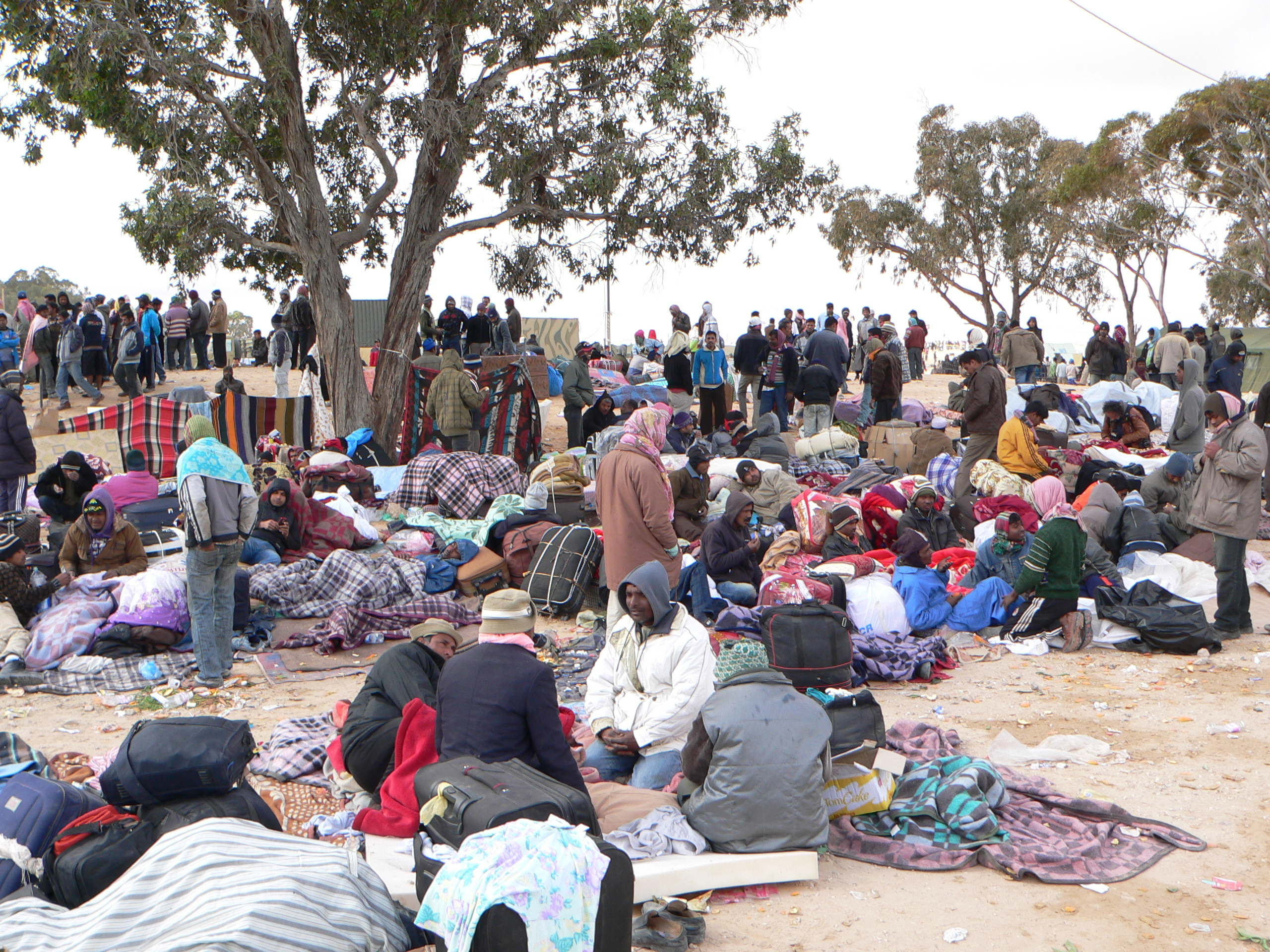
Migrant workers fleeing the violence at the camp

The residents in Choucha refugee camp fled from the ongoing violence in Libya. Most of them were third-country nationals that were working in Libya when the war started. Libyans that fled the war quickly found hosting families or other housing, therefore their presence in the refugee camp is minimal. The registration of refugees in the camp was done by the UNHCR. The organisation started the registration on the 8th of March, 2011. After the 29th of March, the number of inhabitants of all camps surrounding Choucha were counted together so that there are no exact numbers of the camp.

Population Choucha refugee camp
	Total number of residents	Main ethnicity
March 8	15.000	-
March 9	16.558	Bangladeshi (13.277)
March 10	17.220	Bangladeshi (13.748)
March 13	17.130	Bangladeshi (11.597)
March 14	16.175	Bangladeshi (9.993)
March 15	15.751	Bangladeshi (8.443)
March 16	11.822	Bangladeshi (6.030)
March 18	8.829	Bangladeshi (4.084)
March 21	4.748	-
March 22	7.716	Sudanese (2.076)
March 27	7.286	Somali (1.639)
March 29	7.465	Chadian (1.818)

From the opening of Choucha, most inhabitants were Bangladeshi migrants who used to work in Libya. Most of them were repatriated to Bangladesh within the month of March through the Humanitarian Evacuation Cell (HEC) that was set up by the IOM and UNHCR. From April 2011 on, the Choucha camp population would consist for the biggest part of sub-Saharan African nationals. Gradually, they would leave the camp either to go further into Tunisia or to leave for Europe. When the camp closed down in July 2013, the UNHCR reported that there were around 250 people left, to whom the Tunisian government offered temporary residence.

=== NGOs ===
Several NGOs were present in Choucha and the surrounding refugee camps.

- Danish Refugee Council
- Doctors without Borders
- IFRC, Tunisian Red Crescent
- International Medical Corps
- International Relief Development
- Islamic Relief
- IOM
- Médecins du Monde
- Safe the Children
- UNHCR
- UNICEF
- WHO

The United Arab Emirates as a country also supported and managed one of the camps near Choucha.

== Humanitarian situation ==
=== Medical situation ===
The quick influx of refugees from February 2011 on made the hygienic situation in Choucha difficult. The first weeks there were no showers and few water points. As more and more NGOs arrived in the refugee camp, more needs were met. The UNHCR started heading a Sanitary Alert system that held daily meetings with other NGOs, the Tunisian ministry of Health and EU-representatives to prevent epidemics. A lot of people who were migrant workers in Libya did not receive any health care before the civil war in Libya started. So the consumption of health care was higher than in most refugee camps. The health care in Choucha consisted of the following:

From March 16, 2011 the Tunisian Ministry of Health together with the WHO started vaccination campaigns in Choucha.

MSF started offering mental health services in the camp.

Danish Refugee Council and UNICEF were available for children's health care. UNICEF started a vaccination campaign for children under 5 years old.

From October 2012 the UNHCR stopped providing medical care for people who were denied refugee status, but who remained in the camp.

=== Legal situation ===
In Tunisia there is no legal framework to ask for asylum. Therefore, residents of Choucha refugee camp could only be acknowledged by asking for international protection with the UNHCR. In asking for international protection, residents of the camp would agree with a resettlement program to a safe third country. There have been several European countries who were willing to host the residents of the camp who were granted international protection. However, there have been few actual resettlements. Moreover, there has been criticism of the inability for residents of Choucha to do an appeal when the UNHCR does not grant international protection.

=== Incidents ===
There have been several incidents reported. In May 2011 and March 2012 there were fires in the camp that caused several fatalities and injured.

In May 2011, several migrants demanded to be resettled immediately by the UNHCR after a big fire and this caused a lot of unrest, also with the local population. The situation turned violent and in the following days Choucha camp was destroyed for the biggest part.

== Current situation ==
=== Sub-Saharan migrants ===
The camp was officially closed in June 2013 by the UNHCR. However, several hundreds of migrants - mostly from Sub-Saharan African countries - stayed in the camp. Some organisations, like MSF, stayed in the surroundings of the camp to help the inhabitants of Choucha with food and health care, since there was no water or electricity in the camp. In June 2017, four years after the camp was officially closed, Tunisian authorities evicted the remaining inhabitants of Choucha. The sudden eviction was condemned by several organizations and NGOs, because of alleged violations of human rights.
