= Humanitarian situation during the Libyan civil war (2011) =

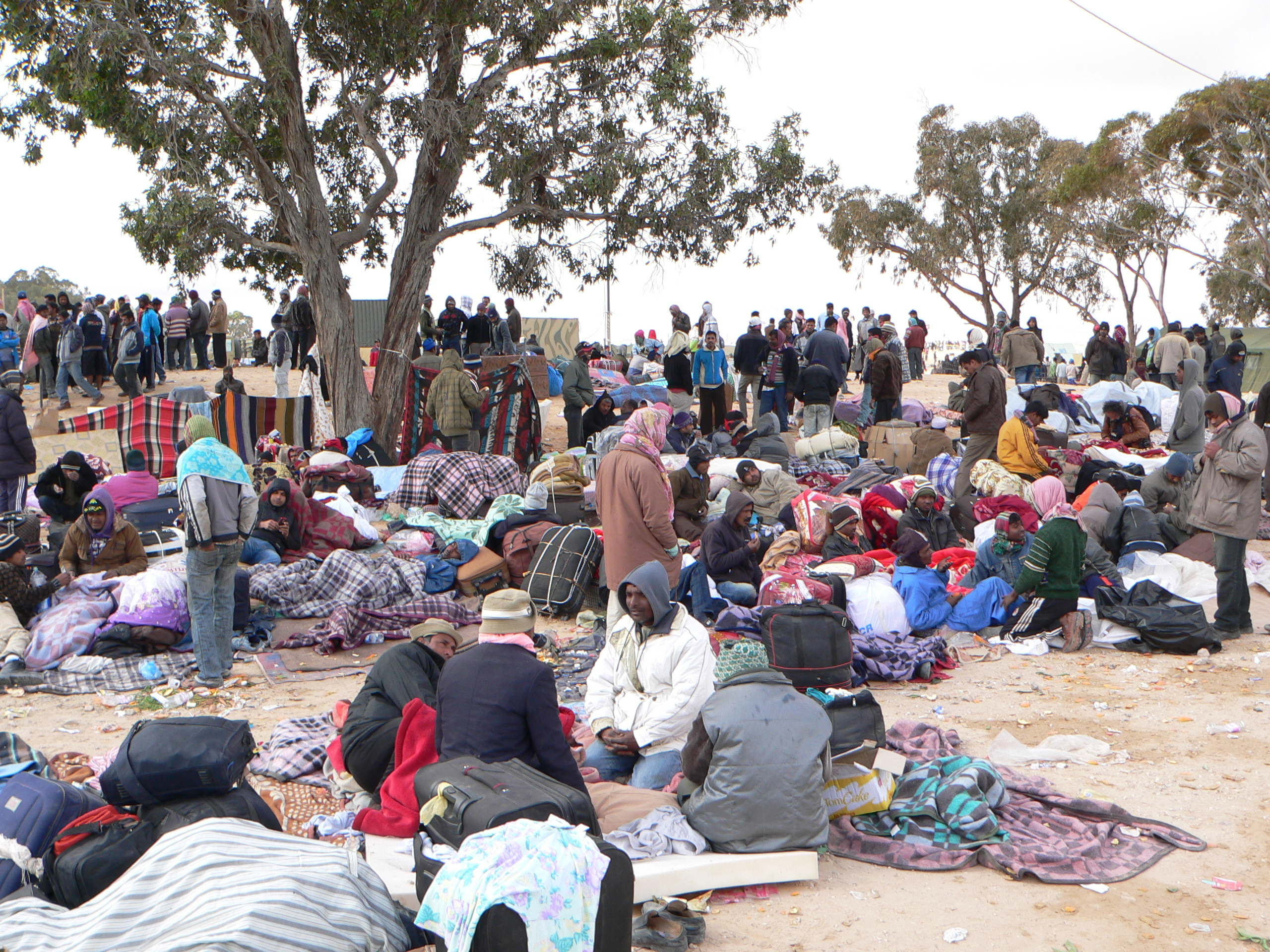
Migrant workers fleeing the violence at Choucha refugee camp, Tunisia.

By the end of February 2011, medical supplies, fuel and food were dangerously low in Libya. On 25 February, the International Committee of the Red Cross launched an emergency appeal for US$6,400,000 to meet the emergency needs of people affected by the violent unrest in Libya. On 2 March, the ICRC's director general reminded everyone taking part in the violence that health workers must be allowed to do their jobs safely.

According to Al Jazeera at the end of February that year, witnesses reported that African migrant workers were being attacked, injured, and perhaps killed by anti-government mobs. "We were being attacked by local people who said that we were mercenaries killing people. Let me say that they did not want to see black people," Julius Kiluu, a sixty-year-old building supervisor, told Reuters. "Our camp was burnt down, and we were assisted by the Kenyan embassy and our company to get to the airport," he said.

On 2 March, the British Royal Navy destroyer HMS York arrived in Benghazi carrying medical supplies and other humanitarian aid donated by the Swedish government. The medical supplies, a donation to the Benghazi Medical Centre, were supposed to have been flown direct to Benghazi airport but were diverted to Malta when the airport closed down. They were transferred from the airport to the destroyer at short notice by the Maltese Armed Forces. On 8 March, a convoy of trucks from the UN World Food Programme (WFP) had entered Libya and was due to arrive in the eastern port city of Benghazi on the same day, the WFP said in a statement. A convoy carrying seventy metric tonnes of high-energy date bars crossed the Egyptian border overnight on its way to the eastern port. On 7 March, U.N. aid coordinator Valerie Amos stated that fighting across Libya meant that more than a million people fleeing or inside the country needed humanitarian aid. Islamic Relief and the WFP also coordinated a shipment of humanitarian supplies to Misrata.

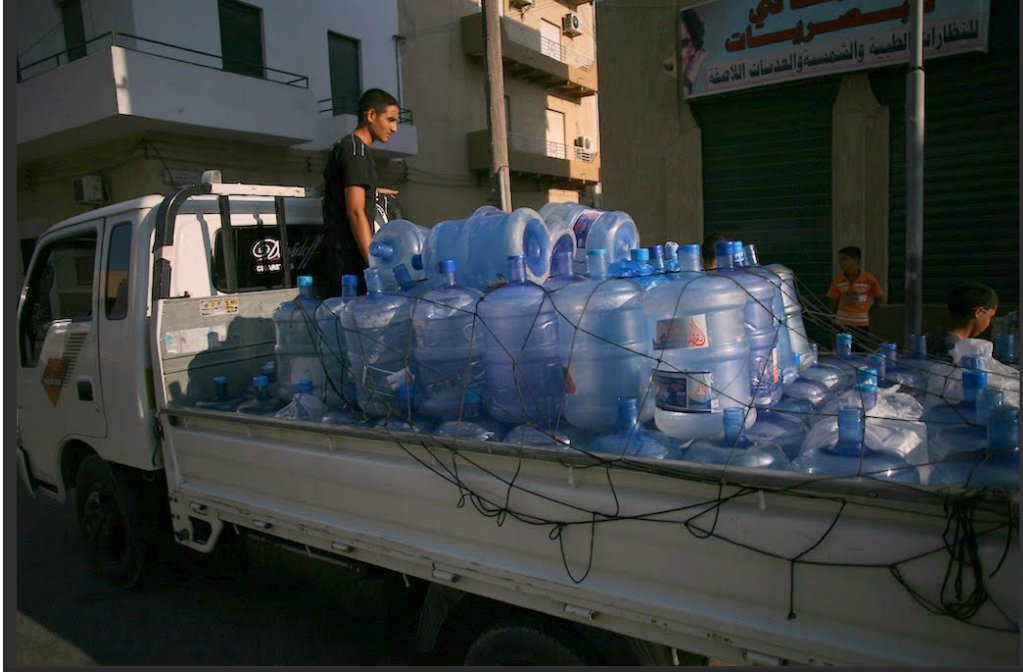
Tripoli had its running water cut off, forcing residents to buy bottled water as shown here.

Turkey sent the ferry Ankara, which had been converted into a hospital ship, to assist wounded victims of the fighting in Misrata. The ferry docked at the Misrata port on 2 April, and was escorted by twelve Turkish Air Force F-16 jets based in Bandırma and Dalaman, four tanker aircraft based on İncirlik, and the Turkish Navy frigate TCG Yıldırım. After 230 wounded people and 60 attendants were taken on board, the ferry left Misrata for Benghazi. On 4 April, the ferry sailed from Benghazi to Turkey with an additional 190 people, including 90 injured. The IHH Humanitarian Relief Foundation sent a cargo ship carrying nine containers with 141 tons of humanitarian aid including medication, food packages, infant formula, milk powder, hygiene kits, and clothing. The ship set sail from Turkey and dropped anchor in Malta.

By 11 April, hundreds of foreign labourers from countries including Bangladesh, Egypt, Ghana, Niger and Sudan – who were previously attracted by jobs in a once-prosperous Misrata – had not been evacuated. A labourers' spokesperson said there were 650 trapped workers from Ghana, 750 from Chad, and 2,000 from Niger. Another spokesperson also gave a Daily Telegraph reporter handwritten sheets of names that he said represented hundreds of stranded Sudanese.

For over fifty days, Misrata was shelled by artillery and hit by tanks and snipers, and for over twenty days had its water intentionally shut off by Gaddafi forces. Sewage was intentionally re-routed into water wells by Gaddafi forces. As supplies ran short, hundreds of thousands were at risk of death.

Human rights groups have contributed extensive evidence documenting human rights abuses during the Libyan conflict. In August 2011, Physicians for Human Rights published a report on Misrata documenting severe violations of human rights and evidence of war crimes including torture, summary execution, rape as a weapon of war, forced disappearances, using civilians as human shields, indiscriminate attacks on civilians, and violations of medical neutrality. In December 2011, PHR released another report documenting evidence of a massacre at a warehouse in Tripoli in which soldiers of Khamis Qaddafi's 32nd Brigade unlawfully detained, raped, tortured and executed at least 53 detainees. PHR's investigation and resulting report provided the first comprehensive account of the 32nd Brigade massacre, and provided forensic evidence needed to secure accountability for crimes according to international legal standards.

A humanitarian ship docked in harbour of Misrata late on 14 April to begin the evacuation of nearly 8,300 stranded migrants living around the port in temporary accommodation in tents and shelters made from tarpaulins. The Red Cross also released a statement that it expected one of its medical supply shipments to arrive at Misrata in the near future.

On 11 May, Polish Foreign Minister Radoslaw Sikorski paid a visit to Benghazi, during which the Polish government provided its medical-aid transport for those who sustained injuries during the clashes in Misrata and other Libyan cities.

== Plight of migrant workers in Libya ==
A major destination country in North Africa, migrants in Libya constituted 10.5 percent of the total Libyan population in 2010. Economic migrants in Libya came from a wide range of countries of origin. In the past, most migrants came from Arab countries, mainly Egypt and Tunisia, but the last decade had seen more sub-Saharan African migrants as a result of more-relaxed open-border policies for southern countries. According to the World Bank, in 2009 migrant workers sent home an estimated US$1 billion in remittances, i.e., 1.7 percent of Libya's GDP.

Migrants were trying to escape the Libyan crisis as violence continued to escalate in the country. When migrants started to exit the country for the Egyptian and Tunisian borders, the International Organization for Migration (IOM) began immediate evacuation operations for stranded migrants at international borders. Migrants received humanitarian assistance, including medical services from IOM, as well as immediate repatriation in coordination with their respective governments to their countries of origin within a window of five to seven days. The operational border points were at Sallum, Egypt; Ras Ajdir into Tunisia; Dirkou, Niger; and Faya, Chad. As of 10 July, the cross-border movement for Third Country Nationals (TCN) reached over 290,000 persons. In the context of the Libya crisis, TCNs comprised migrants who crossed the border from Libya to a country that was not their country of origin. As of 10 July, IOM had evacuated over 150,000 migrants to their countries of origin by plane, ship and international buses.

Libya's third-largest city, Misrata had been the rebel's main stronghold in the west and was under constant artillery fire by pro-Gaddafi forces. There was a pressing need for evacuations given the large number of critically ill migrants who were caught in the artillery cross fire and were trapped in Misrata. The IOM chartered ships from Misrata to Benghazi, a city in the rebel-held east to evacuate wounded migrants. The ships had on-board field hospitals run by LibAid that included a ful intensive-care unit for head-trauma injuries caused by shrapnel from the artillery shelling. Since mid-April, the IOM rescued over 7,500 people in ten sea evacuations. Once in Benghazi, the migrants were taken to Sallum, Egypt, by road and continued to be assisted by the IOM in returning to their country of origin.

Migrants were also stranded elsewhere in Libya, such as in the southern towns of Sebha and Gatroum. Of the two thousand Chadian migrants who were trapped in Sabha and Qatrun, nearly forty percent were women, children and the elderly who had been living under difficult conditions in the open southern Libyan Desert. Evacuations by air organized by the IOM began early July. Whilst waiting for evacuation, Chadians were provided with food, water, hygiene materials and medical assistance by the IOM and the Libyan Red Crescent.
