= Tunisian Red Crescent =

Logo of the Tunisian Red Crescent

The Tunisian Red Crescent (Arabic: الهلال الأحمر التونسي, romanized: al-Hilāl al-Aḥmar al-Tūnisī) is a Tunisian humanitarian association founded in 1956, after the independence of the country. It is one of the national affiliates of the International Movement of the Red Cross and Red Crescent. It was led by Brahim El Gharbi until his death in 2018.

== Values ==
The work on TRC is based on seven values and principles:

- Humanity
- Impartiality
- Neutrality
- Independence
- Volunteering
- Unity
- Universality

== Main goals ==
Its main objectives are developing the survival skills for communities in case of disasters and the setting and analysis of a database.

== Notable people ==
- Habiba Djilani
- Brahim El Gharbi
- Rouslen Hammami Attouchi
