= International reactions to the Libyan civil war (2011) =

The international reactions to the Libyan Civil War were the responses to the series of protests and military confrontations occurring in Libya against the government of Libya and its de facto head of state Muammar Gaddafi.

Many states and supranational bodies condemned Gaddafi's regime over its attacks on civilian targets within the country. Virtually all Western countries cut off diplomatic relations with Gaddafi's government over an aerial bombing campaign in February and March, and a number of other countries led by Peru and Botswana did likewise. The regime's use of the Libyan Air Force to strike civilians led to the adoption of United Nations Security Council Resolution 1973 to create a Libyan no-fly zone on 17 March, though several countries involved in the resolution's enforcement have also carried out regular strike missions to degrade the offensive capacity of the Libyan Army and destroy the regime's command and control capabilities, effectively acting in de facto support of anti-Gaddafi forces on the ground. Many members of the international community, including the United Nations, the Arab League, and the African Union, explicitly recognized the anti-Gaddafi National Transitional Council as Libya's legitimate representative, with many of those countries explicitly describing it as the legal interim government of the country due to the perceived loss of legitimacy on the part of Gaddafi's regime.

Many states also either issued travel advisories or attempted evacuations. Some evacuations were successful in either going to Malta or via land borders to Egypt or Tunisia; other attempts were hindered by tarmac damage at Benghazi's airport or refusals of permission to land in Tripoli. There were also several solidarity protests in other countries that were mostly composed of Libyan expatriates. Financial markets around the world had adverse reactions to the instability with oil prices rising to a two-and-a-half-year high.

== Supranational ==
United Nations Security Council Resolution 1973
(no-fly zone and other measures)
Countries committed to enforcement:
Belgium
Bulgaria
Canada
Denmark
France
Greece
Italy
Jordan
Netherlands
Norway
Qatar
Romania
Spain
Sweden
United Arab Emirates
United Kingdom
United States

- African Union – The chairman of the African Union Commission Jean Ping said the AU was in contact with the Libyan government and that it condemned the crackdown against protesters. As of a 7 March meeting with a UK representative, they had little more to add. On 11 March they announced a panel, consisting of the leaders of South Africa, Uganda, Mauritania, the Republic of the Congo, and Mali, to travel to Libya to help end the violence. They also rejected a no-fly zone and any intervention by Western powers, but supported an "African solution" of reform.
- Arab League – Secretary-General Amr Moussa stated initially that he was deeply concerned about the situation in Libya and urged for immediate stop of the violence. Later, after an emergency meeting on 22 February, the organisation suspended Libya from taking part in council meetings and Moussa issued a statement condemning the "crimes against the current peaceful popular protests and demonstrations in several Libyan cities." On 7 March, Moussa said Gaddafi had to seek "reconciliation" with his people if he was to remain in power, but he also suggested many in the Libyan opposition would not be open to such efforts. The Arab League met on Saturday 12 March and voted to ask the UN Security Council to impose a no-fly zone, with Algeria and Syria being the only members to vote against the measure.
- European Union – The High Representative of the European Union for External Policy, Catherine Ashton has condemned the crackdown of protests by Libyan authorities and pushed back any threat of Tripoli towards the EU. "The European Union is extremely concerned about the events unfolding in Libya and the reported deaths of a very high number of demonstrators. The EU urges the authorities to exercise restraint and calm and to immediately refrain from further use of violence against peaceful demonstrators. The legitimate aspirations and demands of the people for reform must be addressed through open and meaningful Libya-led dialogue. (...) We have heard threats, we hear people saying you should do this, you should do that, but in the end the EU will do what is right," Ashton replied concerning threats Libya delivered to the rotating Hungarian presidency of the EU, stating that Tripoli would end co-operation on blocking irregular immigration into the EU if Brussels did not side with Gaddafi. The European Union held meetings regarding Libya on Thursday and Friday, 11–12 March 2011. The European Union's foreign policy chief, Catherine Ashton, flew to Cairo on 13 March to meet with leaders of the Arab League and discuss a "collaborative approach" with Arab League Secretary-General Amr Moussa on Libya and the rest of the region, and would also meet with Egypt's Essam Sharaf and Nabil Elaraby.
- Group of Eight – Foreign ministers from the G8 met on 14 March in Paris to discuss the situation and a possible no-fly zone.
- Gulf Cooperation Council – On 8 March, the GCC issued a joint statement calling on the UN Security Council to impose an air embargo (no-fly zone) on Libya to protect civilians. On 28 March, after member state Qatar announced it was transferring diplomatic recognition of Libya from Gaddafi's government to the National Transitional Council in Benghazi, the GCC publicly backed the move.
- International Criminal Court – On 27 June, ICC has issued arrest warrants for Muammar Gaddafi, Saif Al-Islam Gaddafi and Abdualla Al-Senussi. During the press conference the next day, the ICC prosecutor said that his Office would not focus on crimes allegedly committed by rebels until after the investigations against Gaddafi and his inner circle.
- United Nations – Secretary General Ban Ki-moon in a statement said that bombs against civilians "if confirmed, would constitute a serious violation of international humanitarian law and would be condemned by the secretary-general in the strongest terms." He later issued another statement saying he was "outraged."
  - Security Council president and Permanent Representative of Brazil to the UN Maria Luiza Viotti said in a statement after closed-door consultations that the Security Council "condemned the violence and use of force against civilians, deplored the repression against peaceful demonstrators, and expressed deep regret at the deaths of hundreds of civilians" and also called for "an immediate end to the violence and for steps to address the legitimate demands of the population, including through national dialogue. They underscored the need to hold to account those responsible for [the] attacks, including by forces under their control, on civilians."
  - In the evening of 26 February, the Security Council voted unanimously to pass resolution 1970 introduced by France, the UK, Germany and the US that would sanction ten top Libyan officials, Gaddafi and his family. It also issued travel bans and an arms embargo. The Security Council also referred the situation to the International Criminal Court for a war crimes investigation into "widespread and systemic attacks" against protesters. It was only the second time the Security Council had referred a case to the ICC (the first being Darfur) and the first unanimous referral.
  - Navi Pillay, the UN High Commissioner for Human Rights, condemned the violence employed by security forces for its use of live ammunition against protesters.
  - On 17 March, the UN Security Council passed Resolution 1973 (2011) for a Libyan no-fly zone and all measures, short of an occupying ground force, needed to protect civilians. Ten members backed the resolution and five abstained, but only nine votes were needed for it to pass.
  - On 9 August, the head of UNESCO, Irina Bokova stated that she deplores the NATO strike on Libyan State TV, Al-Jamahiriya that killed three journalists and wounding more. She also stated "media outlets should not be targeted in military actions".
  - On 11 August, after the 9 August NATO airstrike on Majer, that allegedly killed 85 civilians, UN Secretary-General Ban Ki-moon called on "all sides" to do as much as possible to avoid killing innocent people.

== Governments ==
=== Middle East and North Africa (MENA) ===
- Algeria – Algeria was one of just two countries (with Syria) to vote against the Arab League resolution that called on the United Nations to impose a no-fly zone over Libya. Algeria has faced a mounting humanitarian crisis as many fleeing strife in Libya attempt to cross the common border between the two Maghreb states. On 29 March, Interior Minister Dahou Ould Kablia announced the Algerian Army was increasing its security presence on the border with Libya, citing concerns over potential infiltration by Al-Qaeda in the Islamic Maghreb, a terrorist group Tripoli has repeatedly claimed is attempting to overthrow the Libyan government. "The border with Libya has become a threat to Algeria's security," Ould Kablia said, claiming that Algerian soldiers recently intercepted and killed a "terrorist" crossing into Algeria from Libya.
- Bahrain – Foreign Minister Sheikh Khalid bin Ahmed bin Mohammed Al Khalifa speaking to Al Jazeera's David Frost, when asked of the comparative responses in Libya and his own country called the situation in Libya "tragic." Bahrain is a member of the Libya Contact Group. On 23 August, he announced that Manama recognised the National Transitional Council as "the sole legitimate authority of the brotherly Libyan people".
- Egypt – Inspiration for the Libyan protests was linked to the successful overthrow of president Hosni Mubarak. The post-revolution military junta in Egypt is quietly arming rebels in Libya, according to reports. Speaking on 18 March (17 March EST) in Delhi, India, presidential candidate and revolutionary leader Mohamed ElBaradei called upon the United Nations Security Council ahead of a scheduled vote to authorize international military action to support the Libyan rebels. On 22 August, the Egyptian government said it recognised the National Transitional Council.
- Iran – President Mahmoud Ahmadinejad condemned the crackdown, asking rhetorically, "How can a leader subject his own people to a shower of machine-guns, tanks and bombs? How can a leader bomb his own people, and afterwards say 'I will kill anyone who says anything?'" Foreign Ministry spokesman Ramin Mehmanparast also condemned the Libyan government's crackdown stating "the Islamic Republic of Iran deems the Libyans' uprising and their rightful demands in line with the region's Islamic awakening." However, Iranian Supreme Leader Ali Khamenei also condemned the NATO intervention in Libya saying that it was aimed at "getting their hands on its oil."
- Iraq – Iraq sent a high-level delegation to a closed-door summit with world leaders in Paris on 19 March to discuss international action against Gaddafi's regime. Foreign Minister Hoshyar Zebari, representing both the Iraqi government and the Arab League, reportedly "argued passionately in favor of action" at the summit. The Cabinet formally recognised the National Transitional Council on 23 August.
- Israel – President Shimon Peres said from Spain that there was "an irony of history" that Gaddafi had once called for "a Middle East without Israel" but that "there will be a Libya without Gaddafi." Prime Minister Benjamin Netanyahu called both Libya and Iran, another country rocked by demonstrations in recent weeks, "serial violators of human rights" and said Gaddafi is "massacring his opponents". However, Foreign Minister Avigdor Lieberman suggested Israel should keep its distance from the Libyan opposition, while the Deputy Minister for the Development of Negev and the Galilee Ayoob Kara conducted direct talks with the Libyan government, represented by Saif al-Islam Gaddafi, for the establishment of official relations and for Libyan assistance in the release of a Hamas captive. The negotiations continued until the opposition took control of Tripoli.
  - Leader of the Opposition and former Foreign Minister Tzipi Livni wrote that the protesters were part of "days of momentous change in the Middle East" and cautioned, "In the best-case scenario, the wave sweeping across the region will enable democracy to take root in the Arab world ... but the negative scenario is that this opening will be abused by those ... who seek to use the democratic process to advance an anti-democratic agenda."
- Jordan – On 24 May, Jordan recognized the National Transitional Council, and it upgraded its recognition of the NTC to consider as Libya's legal government as of 22 August. It is a participant in the NATO-led military intervention in Libya and a member of the Libya Contact Group.
- Kuwait – The government condemned Gaddafi and called for all Arab countries to condemn the violence. The Voice of Russia reported Kuwait recognized the National Transitional Council on 13 April 2011. Kuwait is a member of the Libya Contact Group.
- Lebanon – The Shia population was also reported to have taken notice that Musa Sadr's 1978 disappearance in Libya could be resolved. Lebanon introduced and voted for a United Nations Security Council resolution to establish a Libyan no-fly zone in response to persistent reports Gaddafi's forces were attacking civilians in Libya. Lebanon is a member of the Libya Contact Group. On 23 August, the Lebanese Cabinet decided to officially recognise the National Transitional Council.
  - Hezbollah said that "anyone with honour and consciousness in this world cannot, and should not, keep silent on the massacres that the Gaddafi regime is committing across the country on a daily basis. Hezbollah firmly condemns crimes committed by the Gaddafi regime against the oppressed Libyan people. Hezbollah expresses support to the revolutionists (sic) in Libya and we pray that they will triumph over this arrogant tyrant."
  - Lebanon and Syria were said to be in talks on a possible rescue mission for its citizens.
  - Lebanon refused landing permission to a private Libyan aircraft with 10 people on board after Lebanon asked Libya to show the identities of the passengers before take off from Tripoli. Hannibal Gaddafi's wife Aline Skaff was reported to be one of the passengers.
- Mauritania – Several members of Parliament took the floor on 24 March to condemn the "awful killings" in Libya and express solidarity with the protesters. In early June, President Mohamed Ould Abdel Aziz said Gaddafi should leave power.
- Morocco – On 22 August, Foreign Minister Taib Fassi Fihri said his government recognised the National Transitional Council "as the sole and legitimate representative of the Libyan people".
- Oman – The government lobbied successfully at the Arab League for the regional bloc to call upon the UN to impose a no-fly zone over Libya. Oman is also part of the Gulf Co-operation Council, which also called for the international community to take action in Libya and criticized Gaddafi. Oman officially recognised the National Transitional Council on 23 August.
- Qatar – The Foreign Ministry commented: "Qatar is following with extreme concern the current events in Libya as well as the authorities' use of warplanes and firearms against civilians...Qatar denounces the use of these arms and asks the Libyan authorities to stop the use of force against civilians and end the bloodshed." Yahya Mahmassani, who represents the Arab League to the United Nations, suggested Qatar may join in enforcement of a Libyan no-fly zone before the vote to authorize it took place at the United Nations Security Council. Qatar recognized the National Transitional Council as Libya's legitimate government on 28 March amidst an emerging deal for Qatar's national oil company to market oil exported from the petroleum-rich territory administered by the Libya. Qatar is a member of the Libya Contact Group.
- Sudan – The government announced recognition of the National Transitional Council on 24 August and said it was trying to establish "practical relations" with the body. On 26 October, President Omar al-Bashir claimed Khartoum supplied the anti-Gaddafi forces with humanitarian aid as well as weapons and ammunition, some of which were used in the capture of Tripoli in late August.
- Syria – President Bashar al-Assad has rejected any foreign intervention in Libya and called on the Libyan people to resist any threat and end the conflict. Syria was the only one of two Arab League states to vote against a request to the UN for a no-fly zone, the other country being Algeria. Syria has also said it was absolutely against foreign military forces or interference in Libya. The Syrian foreign ministry said- "Syria affirms its rejection of all forms of foreign interference in Libyan affairs, since that would be a violation of Libya's sovereignty, its independence and the unity of its land,". Libyan rebels allege that Syrian mercenaries were flying planes for the Libyan regime, and that they shot down two Syrian fighter planes.
- Tunisia – The Tunisian Revolution, which set off a revolutionary wave throughout the Middle East, was cited as an early inspiration for protests in Libya. Al Jazeera uncovered a secret diplomatic mission to post-revolutionary Tunis from Gaddafi's regime on 19 March, eventually prompting an intervention by Tunisian police to rescue the news team from harassment by the Libyan envoy and hotel security staff. Tunisian authorities have been overwhelmed by refugees from Libya attempting to cross the border since the Libyan uprising began, especially after the UN Security Council imposed a no-fly zone over Tunisia's larger eastern neighbor. On 20 April, the government reportedly closed at least some sections of Tunisia's border with Libya in response to the alleged incursion of Libyan troops loyal to Muammar Gaddafi into Tunisia in pursuit of refugees. Media reported allegations that rockets and ammunition were fired by Libyan forces across the border into Tunisia as well. State media later reported that at least 13 Libyan soldiers, including a Libyan Army general, turned themselves over to Tunisian troops at a border crossing after fleeing a successful rebel advance in the western Nafusa Mountains that left control on the Libyan side of the international border split between pro- and anti-Gaddafi forces. An Al Jazeera reporter in Tunisia presented a much higher estimate of the number of soldiers who surrendered themselves into Tunisian custody, saying as many as 100 defected. On 15 June, a government spokesman said Tunisia would recognize the National Transitional Council if it requested diplomatic recognition from Tunis. He said his government had remained neutral previously in the conflict, but after observing major attacks by Gaddafi against the civilian population as well as artillery strikes and troop incursions in Tunisian territory, it felt Gaddafi had lost "all legitimacy" and it had decided to support the would-be revolutionaries in Libya. Tunisia formally recognised the NTC on 20 August.
- United Arab Emirates – The government condemned the violence against the protesters and president Khalifa bin Zayed Al Nahyan instructed his family's charity foundation to provide relief aid to the people of Libya. The UAE recognized the National Transitional Council on 12 June and is a member of the Libya Contact Group.

=== Sub-Saharan Africa ===
- Angola – Oil Minister Jose Botelho de Vasconcelos attributed rising oil prices to "the geopolitical situation in Libya and other countries" on 13 April.
- Botswana – In February, the government condemned the violence. "The Ministry of Foreign Affairs and International Cooperation has today, called in the Libyan representative to protest in the strongest possible terms, against the killings and condemn these actions. The government urges the Libyan government to exercise restraint in addressing the situation." Botswana then severed diplomatic ties with Libya on 23 February because "the leader of Libya was not remorseful and made defiant pronouncements despite the violence visited on [its] people..." The government issued a statement on 12 April professing support for African Union mediation efforts but echoing criticism directed at the proposal by Benghazi and several Western countries, noting that "Botswana strongly believes that any new political dispensation which includes a role for Gaddafi, his family and members of his regime should not be considered under any circumstances". On 20 April, The Botswana Gazette quoted a government official as saying that the government refused to accept a gift of agricultural equipment from the Libyan government. "It has nothing to do with severing of ties between the two countries," the official, Public Relations Director Tshenolo Modise, insisted, though she acknowledged that the government found the gift improper because its memorandum of understanding with Libya was left incomplete at the time Botswana terminated bilateral relations. Despite the African Union deciding to disregard an International Criminal Court warrant for Gaddafi's arrest, the Foreign Ministry issued a statement on 6 July saying Botswana supports the warrant and intends to enforce it. Botswana recognized NTC on 11 August.
- Burkina Faso – On 24 August, the government announced that it recognised the National Transitional Council but was prepared to offer Gaddafi asylum if he requested it, even though Burkina Faso is a member of the International Criminal Court, which has issued a warrant for Gaddafi's arrest.
- Cape Verde – The government recognised the National Transitional Council as "the legitimate interlocutor" of Libya on 26 June and reiterated its recognition on 26 August, calling for a peaceful democratic transition and respect for Libya's territorial integrity.
- Chad – President Idriss Déby Itno said he was "100 percent sure" that Al Qaeda in the Islamic Maghreb looted Libyan military arsenals and stole surface-to-air missiles, saying, "The Islamists of al Qaeda took advantage of the pillaging of arsenals in the rebel zone to acquire arms, including surface-to-air missiles, which were then smuggled into their sanctuaries in Tenere." Déby also said al Qaeda was actively fighting against Gaddafi in the rebellion, saying "There is a partial truth in what [Gaddafi] says. Up to what point? I don't know. But I am certain that AQIM took an active part in the uprising." On 24 March, Inner City Press reported that Chad's ambassador to the United Nations told journalists that "Gaddafi has no friends". In a statement in early April, a government statement blamed Libyan rebels who have "singled out" Chadian nationals as "mercenaries", accusing them of unjustly killing Chadians in Libya. The statement also rejected the notion of Chadian mercenaries fighting in the Libyan civil war. On 24 August, Chad recognised the National Transitional Council.
- Comoros – The government obtained help from Turkey in evacuating Comorian nationals from Libya during the uprising. Libya continues to maintain a military presence in the archipelago country ahead of a scheduled transfer of power.
- Ivory Coast – In a statement on 25 August, Foreign Minister Daniel Duncan said his government was "very worried about the ongoing situation in Libya, caused by the massacre of the civilian population, the massive violations of human rights" and had chosen to recognise the National Transitional Council as "the sole legitimate representative of the Libyan people". The Second Ivorian Civil War broke out in March 2011 when the crisis in Ivory Coast escalated into full-scale military conflict between forces. After months of unsuccessful negotiations and violence, the crisis entered a critical stage as Ouattara's forces seized control of most of the country, with Gbagbo entrenched in Abidjan, the country's largest city. International organizations have reported numerous instances of human rights violations. The UN and French forces took military action, with the stated objective to protect their forces and civilians.
- Equatorial Guinea – Media reported that president Teodoro Obiang Nguema called Gaddafi twice and attempted to rally African Union support for the embattled Libyan strongman, though Malabo later insisted the phone calls were "misrepresented" and said the president was acting only in his capacity as the current AU head. The government has prohibited reports on the Arab Spring from the Equatorial Guinean airwaves.
- Ethiopia – French Foreign Minister Alain Juppe said on 12 July that he had met with prime minister Meles Zenawi over the crisis in Libya and Zenawi had agreed Gaddafi must leave power. There was no official statement from the Ethiopian government itself. A spokesman for the government said on 24 August that Ethiopia recognised the National Transitional Council and encouraged the African Union to do likewise.
- Gabon – Gabon voted for the UN resolution imposing a Libyan no-fly zone on 17 March in its capacity as a nonpermanent member of the United Nations Security Council. On 12 August recognizes NTC.
- Gambia – President Yahya Jammeh urged Gaddafi to step down and criticised the African Union for its "unacceptable silence." The Gambian government arranged for the evacuation of over 300 citizens of ECOWAS countries on 19 March, state-owned media reported. On 22 April, Gambia recognized the National Transitional Council as the only legitimate body representing Libyan interests and expelled all diplomats loyal to Gaddafi.
- Ghana – The Ministry of Foreign Affairs said it was not sure how many Ghana nationals were in Libya as of February, when the conflict began. On 22 March, Foreign Minister Alhaji Mohammed Mumuni said more than 16,000 Ghanaians had been evacuated thus far, exceeding initial estimates of the number of Ghanaians in Libya by 6,000. Mumuni said the government is still struggling to figure out how many Ghanaians remain in need of evacuation, but promised Accra "remains committed to bringing the last Ghanaian in Libya home". The West African country's embassies in both Libya and Burkina Faso have endeavored to repatriate Ghanaians caught in the crisis back to Ghana.
- Guinea – The government refused to permit Guinean citizens to rally in support of Gaddafi on 25 March.
- Kenya – On 2 April, East African Business Week reported that its reporter had spoken to a Kenyan government official who said there was "no such discussion" in Nairobi over whether to seize Gaddafi's assets in Kenya, in defiance of United Nations Security Council Resolution 1970.
- Lesotho – The government was concerned about the situation.
- Liberia – The government condemned the violence and expressed regret at the loss of lives of Africans in Libya. However, President Ellen Johnson Sirleaf said that based on the Liberian experience with international military intervention, she did not believe the Libyan conflict could or should be resolved by foreign armed forces' action in the country. On 14 June, the government announced that it had severed diplomatic relations with the Gaddafi regime, withdrawing its ambassador and diplomatic staff from Tripoli and revoking the diplomatic status of the Libyan Embassy officials in Monrovia. The Ministry of Foreign Affairs stated that "the Government took the decision after a careful review of the situation in Libya and determined that the Government of Colonel Gaddafi has lost the legitimacy to govern Libya. The violence against the Libyan people must stop." Sirleaf later said that her government was considering recognizing the National Transitional Council.
- Malawi – The government announced on 14 April that it had severed diplomatic relations with Libya, citing "the prevailing hostilities and armed violence in Libya which have caused grave loss civilian life".
- Mali – The government requested and received assistance from France in repatriating at least 166 Malians who fled from Libya to Egypt during the crisis. Officials with the Ministry of Foreign Affairs, speaking to BBC News on condition of anonymity, said they were aware of large-scale recruitment of Tuareg mercenaries in Mali by Gaddafi loyalists. One official said the government opposed the use of mercenaries and was considering options for preventing their export from the country. Meanwhile, the African Solidarity for Democracy and Independence opposition party has openly declared its support for Gaddafi, denouncing what it called "the virulent media campaign of propaganda and disinformation" against him and claiming Western countries want to control Libya's oil and install a puppet government.
- Mozambique – President Armando Guebuza condemned the violence in the Arab world, including Libya, calling it "unacceptable". Guebuza said that "authorities should listen more to people". Foreign Minister Oldemiro Baloi said four of seven Mozambicans in Libya were evacuated in late February, but the other three elected to remain in the country.
- Niger – The government said it was following events in Libya "with great concern" and was working with the Libyan government to get its citizens out of the country. In late March, it refused to allow citizens to rally in support of Gaddafi in Niamey, breaking with neighboring Mali over whether to allow pro-Gaddafi demonstrations. Niger has struggled to cope with an influx of perhaps over 10,000 refugees from Libya since the start of the conflict, according to the United Nations Refugee Agency.
- Nigeria – Nigeria voted for the UN resolution to establish a Libyan no-fly zone in its capacity as a nonpermanent member of the UN Security Council on 17 March. On 23 August, Nigeria recognised the National Transitional Council, and it urged the AU to follow suit a day later.
- Rwanda – Foreign Minister Louise Mushikiwabo said her government recognised the National Transitional Council on 26 August after unsuccessfully lobbying the African Union Peace and Security Council in Addis Ababa to do likewise.
- Senegal – The government prohibited pro-Gaddafi demonstrations from the streets of Dakar in late March, though it did not prevent a rally that confined itself to the Islamic Institute of Dakar. Senegal recognized the National Transitional Council on 28 May.
- South Africa – In a statement issued on 21 February, the government expressed "grave concern" over reports of numerous civilian deaths following the protests in Libya and called on all parties involved to "exercise restraint in order to prevent further loss of life". The government called on both sides "to seek a speedy and peaceful resolution" to the conflict. A later statement reiterated the government's support for the call made by the AU Peace and Security Council for an "end to the indiscriminate and excessive use of force against demonstrators". Deputy Minister Marius Fransman urged the Libyan government to abide by UN Security Council Resolution 1970 and ensure the safety of foreign nationals and their assets. The Libyan government was asked to facilitate the departure of those wishing to leave the country as well as provide for the safe passage of humanitarian relief into the country. The South African government remained "committed to provide assistance upon request from the Libyan people in ensuring a smooth transition to democratic rule". President Jacob Zuma has also ordered the Treasury to freeze the assets of Gaddafi and his close associates. South Africa voted for the UN resolution to establish a Libyan no-fly zone in its capacity as a nonpermanent member of the UN Security Council on 17 March.
- Seychelles – In a press communique issued on 24 February, President James Michel, who voiced support for both sanctions from the United Nations and calls for international mediation by the African Union, stated, "We are deeply concerned by the disproportionate use of force against defenceless Libyan citizens. It is totally unacceptable and cannot be justified under any circumstances. We join with other members of the international community to call for an immediate end to the brutal repression of citizens." Seychelles has been one of the few African countries that have condemned the Gaddafi regime outright.
- Sierra Leone – The government faced domestic criticism over its allegedly ineffectual efforts to evacuate Sierra Leone nationals from Libya, though officials insisted "unrelenting efforts" were underway to retrieve the West African country's citizens. Information Minister Alhaji Ibrahim Ben Kargbo said his government was "doing everything humanely possible to get Sierra Leoneans out of that besieged country" but admitted repatriation efforts were complicated by a large number of the approximately 125 Sierra Leoneans in Libya seeking to relocate to other countries.
- Swaziland – The Ministry of Foreign Affairs reported on 24 March that a Swazi national has apparently gone missing in Libya since the start of the conflict.
- Tanzania – Several prominent Muslim leaders in the East African country, which has benefited from significant investment from the Libyan government in the past, have expressed support for Gaddafi, whom the Tanzanian government has thus far declined to condemn.
- Uganda – Foreign Affairs Minister Sam Kutesa said the position of his government is that Gaddafi "should not kill his people", but said Kampala does not support international military intervention. Ugandan president Yoweri Museveni, whose longtime relationship with Gaddafi has been at turns friendly and combative, is chairing an African Union delegation intended to broker peace in Libya. The delegation was denied permission to fly to Tripoli after the UN Security Council imposed a no-fly zone over the country. On 30 March, a government official said that if Gaddafi sought to go into exile, Uganda would grant him asylum.
- Zambia – Foreign Affairs Minister Kabinga Pande said the government was planning for the evacuation of Zambian nationals from Libya in late February. Pande said ties between Libya and Zambia are unaffected, and he said his government's position is that there should be no foreign intervention in Libya. However, Finance Minister Situmbeko Musokotwane announced on 23 March that Zambia had frozen Libyan assets in the country, including a controlling share in telephone network Zamtel.
- Zimbabwe – Prime Minister Morgan Tsvangirai's Movement for Democratic Change party declared its sympathies lie with the Libyan opposition. On 7 March, the Zimbabwean Ambassador to Libya was forced to flee back to the Southern African country after accusations mounted that Harare had allowed Gaddafi to hire Zimbabwean mercenaries.

=== Americas ===
- Antigua and Barbuda – Prime Minister Baldwin Spencer said he was "nervously watching developments" in Libya, according to Al Jazeera English. "Whether we like it or not, we're still very much dependent on oil from the Middle East and most of our economies are driven by that," said Spencer.
- Argentina – The government expressed "deep concern", regretted the loss of lives, and called for a quick, peaceful solution.
- Bolivia – President Evo Morales said "Ultimately they are interested in controlling Libyan oil…That's how the powers are" he cited alleged western interference in Iran – and now "they invent problems with Muammar Gaddafi".
- Brazil – The Ministry of External Relations issued a statement condemning "the acts of violence that were carried out during recent popular demonstrations, leading to civilian deaths" and called "on the officials in that country to uphold and protect the right of free expression of the protesters". The Brazilian Government also urged the Libyan authorities to "urgently address the need to ensure the safe withdrawal of Brazilian citizens who are in the cities of Tripoli and Benghazi". Brazil, a non-permanent member of the United Nations Security Council, abstained from a vote on the UN resolution to establish a Libyan no-fly zone on 17 March.
- Canada – Foreign Affairs Minister Lawrence Cannon has condemned crackdowns on "innocent protesters", and called on the Libyan security forces "to respect the human rights of demonstrators and uphold their commitment to freedom of speech and the right to assembly." Cannon announced on 22 February that it is sending flights to Libya to rescue stranded Canadians, who will be flown through Europe back home. A total of 331 Canadians are registered with the embassy in Tripoli, and 91 have told staff they plan to leave. On 14 June, Canada, which is a member of the Libya Contact Group, recognized the National Transitional Council as the legitimate Libyan government.
  - Canada suspended its diplomatic presence in Libya on 26 February and recalled ambassador to Libya Sandra McCardell.
  - Canada imposed a freeze of the assets of Libyan leader Muammar Gaddafi and his family on 27 February 2011.
  - Three Canadian Forces aircraft (2 C-17 and 1 C-130J) are on standby in Malta to pick up stranded Canadians in Libya with on denied entry to land
  - Canada has dispatched the frigate HMCS Charlottetown to the Mediterranean. It will join an international flotilla off the coast of Libya.
  - Canada has dispatched six CF-18 Hornet fighter aircraft to help enforce the no-fly zone.
- Chile – The Ministry of Foreign Affairs issued a second statement on 23 February expressing that "upon the persistence of unjustified use of force against civil population, the Government of Chile deplores and energetically condemns the governmental repression against its citizens, an action contrary to the spirit of dialogue claimed by Chile and the international community to solve the political crisis in that country, and deeply opposed to the full respect for the human rights consigned in the charter of the United Nations. Therefore, the Government of Chile urges Libyan authorities to establish mechanisms for dialogue and citizen participation and to immediately cease the repression against its own people."
- Colombia – President Juan Manuel Santos condemned the way the Libyan regime is acting upon its people and said that "what is happening in Libya is unacceptable." Colombia voted for the UN resolution to establish a Libyan no-fly zone in its capacity as a non-permanent member of the UN Security Council on 17 March. On 22 August, Santos directed the Ministry of Foreign Affairs to recognise the National Transitional Council, saying, "The Libyan people deserve a regimen that respects human rights, liberty and a government that values democracy."
- Cuba – Former president Fidel Castro, who remained influential within the Communist Party of Cuba, expressed concern that the United States was preparing to invade Libya.
- Dominica – Prime Minister Roosevelt Skerrit said he was concerned about the events in Libya. He said he would not terminate bilateral relations with Libya, however.
- Grenada – The government condemned the violence.
- Guyana – The government condemned the regime in Tripoli's use of violence against protesters and called for dialogue to resolve the conflict.
- Mexico – The government condemned the violence and repression of the Libyan crackdown, and evacuated 12 of their 123 citizens to Italy. Six more fled to Tunisia and two were airlifted to Malta. It also gave its full support to the United States' Libyan policy. On 1 March, Foreign Relations Secretary Patricia Espinosa said Gaddafi's government had committed crimes against humanity by using violence against its citizens, an act she called "intolerable" and "brutal". On 1 April, Energy Secretary Jose Meade said the Mexican government is not concerned over the decrease in oil outflow from Libya resulting from the civil war, believing other OPEC nations can compensate.
- Nicaragua – President Daniel Ortega said he had telephoned Libya to express his solidarity with Gaddafi.
- Panama – On 20 March, President Ricardo Martinelli compared Gaddafi to Manuel Noriega, the Panamanian dictator removed from power by U.S. troops in 1989. Martinelli called the Libyan government's actions "a merciless destruction of the Libyan population" and said it was "very unfortunate" that the regime had "attacked and massacred its own citizens ... and, for 42 years, has had a dictator like Gaddafi". Panama recognized the National Transitional Council on 14 June, becoming the first Latin American country to do so.
- Peru – President Alan García said that "Peru strongly protests against the repression unleashed by the dictatorship of Muammar al-Gaddafi against the people who are demanding democratic reforms to change the government which has been led for 40 years by the same person." Garcia said that Peru would ask the UN Security Council to establish a no-fly zone over Libya to prevent the use of the country's warplanes against the population. Peru also became the first country to cut ties with Libya on 23 February "until the violence against the people ceases" as a result of the aerial bombing of Tripoli.
- Saint Kitts and Nevis – A bank on the main island of Saint Kitts was scheduled to open with funding from Libya, but the project has been suspended.
- Saint Lucia – Prime Minister Stephenson King said that the government is monitoring events in Libya, but it would not break diplomatic ties with Gaddafi's regime. Construction of a Libyan embassy in Saint Lucia, scheduled to get underway during 2011, has been suspended as Tripoli has turned its attention to other affairs.
- Saint Vincent and the Grenadines – Several opposition leaders were angry that the government was still accepting aid from Libya. At a rally, former prime minister Arnhim Eustace called it "blood money" and demanded prime minister Ralph Gonsalves reevaluate his government's relationship with Gaddafi's regime.
- Trinidad and Tobago – Foreign Affairs Minister Surujrattan Rambachan said the 11 Trinidad and Tobago nationals working in Libya were evacuated by 23 February. Rambachan appeared to voice support for the Libyan opposition in their effort to install a constitutional democracy, saying, "What is interesting is that people are prepared to lose their lives in order to secure those freedoms, and that is something that touches me and all of us in T&T."
- United States – US Secretary of State, Hillary Clinton, stated that "Now is the time to stop this unacceptable bloodshed." The U.S. State Department ordered all family members of its embassy employees and non-essential personnel to leave Libya. Obama and Clinton sharpened their criticism after the formation of a rival government in Benghazi, issuing statements urging Gaddafi to step down. Clinton added on 27 February that the U.S. has begun "reaching out" to the organisers of an "interim" government" and that "We've been reaching out to many different Libyans who are attempting to organize in the east and, as the revolution moves westward, there as well. I think it's way too soon to tell how this is going to play out, but we're going to be ready and prepared to offer any kind of assistance that anyone wishes to have from the United States." The United States cosponsored and, after pushing successfully for the inclusion of language allowing member states to take additional military action to protect civilian targets under threat in Libya, voted for a UN Security Council resolution establishing a Libyan no-fly zone, which it is expected to take a major role in enforcing, on 17 March. The no-fly zone was de facto the start of a prolonged bombing campaign of NATO, stretching the mandate of the UN to the NATO 2011 military intervention in Libya. It recognized the National Transitional Council as the legitimate government of Libya on 15 July and is a member of the Libya Contact Group.
  - The United States suspended embassy operations on 25 February, after a plane left for Istanbul carrying the last remaining embassy personnel.
  - The United States also moved to freeze $30 billion in assets belonging to the Libyan government and to Muammar Gaddafi and his family.
  - On 3 March two American warships were passing through the Suez Canal on their way to waters off Libya.
- Uruguay – The Ministry of Foreign Affairs stated on its website that "they are following the violence in Libya with deep concern." The government expressed "concern about the acts of violence taking place in the country, mourning the loss of lives," and urged the government of Libya to conduct a constructive dialogue that allows a pacific end to the current events, with due respect to human rights and democratic values." It also expressed satisfaction over the condemning of the bombings by the United Nations Security Council.
- Venezuela – On 1 March, President Hugo Chávez said: "We must be prudent. We know what our political line is: We don't support invasions, or massacres, or anything like that no matter who does it. A campaign of lies is being spun together regarding Libya [...] I'm not going to condemn him. I'd be a coward to condemn someone who has been my friend." Like Fidel Castro he also warned that the United States was preparing an invasion of Libya to seize control of its oil reserves. Chávez also proposed an international meditation effort between Gaddafi and the opposition to provide a "peaceful solution" to the uprising. Venezuelan Foreign Minister Nicolás Maduro expressed hope that the Libyans would find "a way of solving their problems peacefully without the interference of imperialist states whose interests in the region had been affected".

=== Asia ===
- Armenia – The Ministry of Foreign Affairs declared its willingness to provide humanitarian aid to Libya on 23 March. The government also said that Armenia, as a nearby state, was following the events closely and sought a "peaceful solution".
- Azerbaijan – Foreign Minister Elmar Mammadyrov said the Azeri government will not break off diplomatic ties with Tripoli, believing that terminating Libya–Azerbaijan relations is not the best way to "stabilise the situation". Mammadyrov said his government will make an effort to contact and communicate with "all sides" in the Libyan conflict. An official in the office of President Ilham Aliyev compared crimes allegedly committed by Gaddafi's regime to violations of UN resolutions on Nagorno-Karabakh of which Baku accuses its neighbor Armenia and said both should be dealt with forcefully and equally.
- Bangladesh – The South Asian country had one of the largest foreign populations in Libya when protests began in mid-February, with over 65,000 Bangladeshi nationals living and working in the country. As of late March, only 30,000 have been evacuated, with many of the rest believed to be among the masses of refugees that have tried to cross national borders into Tunisia, Algeria, and Egypt.
- China – Foreign Ministry spokesperson Ma Zhaoxu said Beijing hopes Libya can "restore social stability and normalcy as soon as possible and spare no effort to protect the safety of Chinese people, organizations and assets in Libya." More than 30,000 Chinese nationals worked in Libya, including on oil fields, small shops. On 17 March, China abstained from voting on a United Nations Security Council resolution to establish a Libyan no-fly zone, but repeatedly accused NATO of overstepping its mandate several times during the course of the events.
  - China began their evacuation efforts immediately on 23 February by chartering jets and ferries to Tripoli.
  - On 25 February, the Chinese PLA Navy guide missile frigate Xuzhou was ordered to be the guardship to Chinese evacuation efforts, after being detached from anti-piracy operations off Somali coast. It passed the Suez Canal three days later.
  - A total of 35,860 Chinese citizens had been evacuated from Libya as of 2 March. Aside from the 35,860 nationals, an additional group of 2,100 foreign citizens of 12 different countries have been evacuated as well. Evacuation effort has been sped up to 15 chartered jets per day.
  - On 22 August, after rebels entered Tripoli, Chinese Foreign spokesman Ma Zhaoxu said "China is ready to play an active role in Libya's reconstruction" in a press release on the ministry's website. They also noted that: "The Chinese side respects the choice of the Libyan people and hopes the situation in Libya can return to normal as soon as possible."
- India – The government strongly condemned the violence after an Indian man was killed and many others were injured during the protests. On 17 March, India abstained from voting on a United Nations Security Council resolution to establish a Libyan no-fly zone in its capacity as a nonpermanent member.
  - India deployed two warships for rescue of its citizens from Libya, INS Mysore and INS Jalashwa.
- Georgia – Foreign Minister Grigol Vashadze was also supportive of the prospect of EU sanctions against Gaddafi.
- Indonesia – President Susilo Bambang Yudhoyono stated that the number of dead had become "inappropriate." He also wrote a letter to UN Secretary-General Ban Ki-moon urging the body and the international community to take action helping the people of Libya to prevent more tragedy and casualties. The Minister of Foreign Affairs Marty Natalegawa said that Indonesia is deeply concerned with the situation in Libya, while also announced that Indonesia is seeking the end of the unrest peacefully, democratically and with dialogue.
- Japan – Foreign Minister Seiji Maehara denounced the Libyan government for "the use of extreme violence" against civilian demonstrators and urged it to immediately stop the crackdown. Japan, a member of the Libya Contact Group, joined the United States on 15 July in recognizing the National Transitional Council.
- Kazakhstan – On 23 August, a Foreign Ministry spokesman said the government called for a "cease-fire and the establishment of the government of national unity as soon as possible, as well as for the restoration of the country and security, primarily of civilians" and insisted that Libya's "sovereignty and territorial integrity" be preserved.
- Kyrgyzstan – President Roza Otunbayeva compared Gaddafi to her predecessor, Kurmanbek Bakiyev, and asked why the international community had not moved to freeze Bakiyev's assets during the 2010 revolution against the former president. Ukraine has aided Kyrgyzstan in the evacuation of its citizens from Libya.
- Laos: State owned Lao Airlines bought 2 Airbus A320 ordered by Afriqiyah Airways in which hit the United Nations Security Council Resolution 1970.
- Malaysia – The government closed its embassy in Tripoli, though it expected the closure to be "temporary". At least 126 Malaysians were evacuated from Libya along with the Malaysian ambassador to the country. Prime Minister Najib Razak said the UN should continue to exert pressure if Gaddafi did not stop using violence "against his own people" and professed support for Libyan self-determination, but he criticised the notion of military intervention in the North African country. Najib also rejected comparisons between Malaysia and Libya, suggesting his country's democracy has allowed people to express their views in a way the Libyan model has not allowed. The Socialist Party of Malaysia ripped Gaddafi, saying his government "was never socialist nor 'government by the masses', but an increasingly dictatorial rule of an oligarchic family" and praising the efforts of the Libyan opposition in "fighting the repressive Gaddafi regime" and "challenging the global capitalist system".
- Mongolia – After not commenting on the situation in Libya for months, the Foreign Ministry said on 25 August that it supported the National Transitional Council's efforts to lead a democratic transition and recognised the council as "the legitimate representative of the Libyan people".
- North Korea – The regime in Pyongyang banned its citizens who were working in Libya from returning home.
- Pakistan – The Ministry of Foreign Affairs issued a statement on both the Libyan uprising and the no-fly zone on 22 March, saying, "Peaceful political solution needs to be evolved by the Libyan people themselves in the spirit of mutual accommodation and national reconciliation."
- Philippines – Acting Foreign Affairs Secretary Albert del Rosario was sent to Tunisia to supervise the repatriation of Filipino expatriates.
- Singapore – The government has evacuated 10 Singaporeans from Tripoli to Cairo, where it has an embassy. The Ministry of Foreign Affairs also reiterated its advice that Singaporeans should defer all travel to Libya for during this time.
- South Korea – The government has sent chartered jets to Tripoli and is also dispatching the ROKS Choi Young (DDH-981) that was taking part in anti-piracy operations off the coast of Somalia. As of early April, only 60 South Korean nationals remain in Libya, including 15 embassy officials in Tripoli and 16 individuals in the rebel headquarters of Benghazi. The government has demanded that all South Koreans in contested areas must flee the country due to the dangerous situation. On 24 August, a Foreign Ministry spokesperson said the government recognised the National Transitional Council as "the legitimate governing authority representing the Libyan people".
- Sri Lanka – The President Mahinda Rajapaksa was quoted as saying to the Libyan leader Muammar Gaddafi on the phone to "Establish peace in Libya as soon as possible and safeguard the lives of Libyan people". The Sri Lankan government has sent a chartered flight to evacuate its nationals working in Libya. There were around 1,400 Sri Lankan expatriate workers in Libya who were evacuated from Tripoli in late February.
- Tajikistan – During the early stages of the uprising, the government solicited the support of Russia and Ukraine to help evacuate citizens of Tajikistan from Libya. Ukraine helped evacuate at least 16 Tajikistanis in February.
- Thailand – On 22 March, Foreign Minister Kasit Piromya said his government seeks an end to the civil war. More than 80 Thai citizens remain in Libya as of late March.
- Turkey – The government warned Libya that it was making a mistake in ignoring its peoples' demands. This came despite calls from prime minister Recep Tayyip Erdoğan to his ministers not to comment on the situation pending evacuations of Turkish citizens which had been hampered. Turkey sent flights to Benghazi, but they were turned back because there was no air traffic control. Consequently Turkey sent in catamarans to evacuate its citizens, though some had flown out earlier and some were driven out of Libya to one of its neighbours. Still, Turkish Trade Minister Zafer Caglayan said his country had evacuated almost 600 of its nationals from Libya after looters raided the facilities of Turkish construction companies, but there are no known reports of Turkish citizens being harmed in the raids. On 15 March, Erdoğan said that he telephoned Muammar Gaddafi to urge him to appoint a president with popular support among the Libyan people. "Every leader that is deaf to the demands of society will sooner or later fall to the winds of change," Erdoğan warned at a speech in Istanbul. On 3 July, Turkey transferred its diplomatic recognition to the National Transitional Council. Turkey is also a member of the Libya Contact Group.
- Vietnam – The Spokesperson of the Ministry of Foreign Affairs, Nguyen Phuong Nga raised concerns over the unrest in Libya as well as the fate of Vietnamese citizens in the country. On 14 September 2011, the Vietnam's Permanent Mission to the United Nations sent out a diplomatic note that supports the National Transitional Council of Libya (NTC) to take over Libya's seat at the UN General Assembly. Vietnam said it "respects every decision made by the Libyan people and expects a peaceful power transition in Libya; Libya's independence, sovereignty and territorial integrity are secured. We hope that the National Transitional Council and other political forces in Libya will adopt effective measures to restore peace and stability, and promptly conduct a general election to elect a national reconciliation government which represents the will and interest of the entire Libyan people. Vietnam look forward to cooperating with the new government to enhance friendship between the two countries and is willing to participate in the reconstruction process in Libya within our capability".

=== Europe ===
- Albania – Prime Minister Sali Berisha said his government supports the Libyan no-fly zone and is standing by to help its enforcement. Albania recognized the National Transitional Council on 18 July.
- Austria – A Defence Ministry spokesman said that the Austrian Army had evacuated 62 European nationals. On 18 June, Austria recognized the National Transitional Council as Libya's sole legitimate representative.
- Belarus – A spokesman for the Ministry for Foreign Affairs declared on 21 February that "we hope for a swift cessation of violence and reinstatement of peace and order in that friendly country". The Stockholm International Peace Research Institute reported it had evidence Belarus made arms shipments to Libya before and during the uprising against Gaddafi, with one Il-76 transport arriving in the North African state just before the UN imposed an arms embargo against Libya, and that Libyan officials close to Gaddafi had flown between Belarus and Libya during the uprising. The Belarusian Ministry for Foreign Affairs dismissed these reports as "lies".
- Belgium – Foreign Minister Steven Vanackere was concerned about the issue. "I don't think the situation in Libya can be compared to what happened in Tunisia or Egypt. The average income is bigger and the wage gap is not so outspoken. I think it's mostly the lack of political and personal freedom that is driving people into the streets... For the European Union, Libya is a country with a particular position. Many African refugees who are on their way to Europe, are being stopped in Libya. The fact that Muammar Gaddafi is threatening to open the door to Europe for refugees, is making some nervous. But it's a ridiculous threat." Belgium, a member of the Libya Contact Group, recognized the National Transitional Council on 13 July.
- Bosnia and Herzegovina – On 17 March, Bosnia and Herzegovina voted for a United Nations Security Council resolution to establish a Libyan no-fly zone in its capacity as a nonpermanent member. The three-member presidency decided on 25 August to recognise the National Transitional Council as "the only legitimate representative of the Libyan people".
- Bulgaria – Prime Minister Boyko Borisov called for Gaddafi to step down. Bulgaria recognized the National Transitional Council on 28 June. It is also a member of the Libya Contact Group.
- Czech Republic – Prime Minister Petr Nečas denounced violence against civilians in Libya, saying, "The bloodshed aimed against the civilian population is an unprecedented violation of human rights and has no place in the civilised world. We are shocked at the brutality of the reaction of the Libyan regime to the civic demonstrations." On 10 June 2011, The government announced it was considering diplomatic contact with rebel leadership and was also considering aid package. Czech lower house foreign committee chairman David Vodrazka will meet Mohamed Allagi who is minister of justice and human rights in the National Transition Council on 14 June. On 29 June, the Czech Republic recognized the National Transitional Council as a "credible representative", but on 29 July, Foreign Minister Karel Schwarzenberg said, "I may like them, but unless they control the whole country, I will not recognise them officially." Even as anti-Gaddafi forces took over most of Tripoli in late August, Schwarzenberg continued to say his government was not prepared to recognise the NTC as Libya's government, though he offered its experience and support to the council in achieving a transition to democracy.
- Denmark – Prime Minister Lars Løkke Rasmussen condemned the attacks against civilians. "Popular protests have been met with violence. It is deeply, deeply disturbing. I condemn in the strongest terms what is completely unacceptable violence that we have witnessed in Libya in recent days... There is every reason to sharply distance oneself from Gaddafis completely unacceptable statements about suspending refugee cooperation with the European Union if the EU continues to support Libya's pro-democracy groups" he said. Danish Foreign Minister Lene Espersen required EU sanctions against Gaddafi. Denmark recognized the National Transitional Council on 22 June.
- Estonia – On 21 February, Foreign Minister Urmas Paet called on Libyan authorities to cease their crackdown on protesters. The government escalated its rhetoric on 26 February, vocally supporting economic sanctions against the Libyan government.
- Finland – Foreign Minister Alexander Stubb condemned the violence against civilians and said: "This is about citizens' right to participate in social decision-making and respect for human rights. Dialogue with citizens must be launched. Finland also considers it important that the violence is investigated and those guilty are brought to account for their acts. Finland demands that Libya cooperates to ease and speed up the evacuation of foreigners."
- France – President Nicolas Sarkozy said that the "violence must cease immediately." He also called for the imposition of a no-fly zone over Libya to prevent the Libyan Air Force from bombing the protesters. Prime Minister François Fillon said he was "horrified by the amount of violence." France also announced they were sending military aircraft to evacuate its citizens on 22 February. EU Affairs Minister Laurent Wauquiez described the repression as "completely unacceptable". On 10 March the French government recognized the National Transitional Council (NTC) as the legitimate government of Libya. France co-sponsored and voted for a UN Security Council resolution establishing a no-fly zone in Libya on 17 March, and began enforcement of the no-fly zone on 19 March.
- Greece – A Greek ship arrived in Ra's Lanuf on 22 February to rescue stranded citizens. Foreign Minister Stavros Lambrindis said on 23 August that Athens recognised the National Transitional Council, with which it had maintained diplomatic relations since 15 May.
- Germany – Foreign Minister Guido Westerwelle demanded the end of violence, while Germany's state secretary for EU affairs Werner Hoyer declared: "We are watching with great concern and indignation the violence used by state authorities in Libya and in other states.". Germany issued a travel warning for Libya. Angela Merkel declared that Gaddafi's [second] speech is "very very frightening" and that "he has declared war against his own people". Germany has sent three planes, a Lufthansa jet as well as two Transall transport planes of the German military, which landed in Tripoli on 22 February and are expected to leave later that day. Germany abstained from voting on a no-fly zone resolution as a nonpermanent member of the UN Security Council on 17 March. However, on 13 June, Germany recognized the National Transitional Council as Libya's sole legitimate representative.
- Hungary – Budapest operated the only EU member state embassy in Libya to function throughout the whole civil war, representing all other European Union members plus the United States of America and Canada. On 24 August, the Foreign Ministry announced it had officially transferred recognition to the National Transitional Council and offered support for its efforts to stabilise Libya.
- Iceland – Foreign Minister Össur Skarphéðinsson said that the Libyan government had committed war crimes by firing at unarmed citizens with heavy artillery and planes. He later added that the government of Iceland harshly condemns the acts of the Libyan government. He also said that he supported the "wave of freedom" in North Africa and that the government of Iceland supports every force which wants Gaddafi out.
- Ireland – Minister of Foreign Affairs Eamon Gilmore said on 18 March 2011, "Colonel Gaddafi has lost all legitimacy to rule and should be encouraged to leave the stage." Speaking in the Dáil, Gilmore expressed support for United Nations Security Council Resolution 1973, which authorised the international community to establish a no-fly zone over Libya He said: "Ireland welcomes the adoption of this resolution, which is clearly intended to halt the violence being waged by the Gadafy regime against the Libyan people and to ensure civilian protection. I have also urged that any military actions taken in pursuit of Resolution 1973 should be in full conformity with its terms and be proportionate, targeted and avoid civilian casualties.". On 22 August, the Ministry of Foreign Affairs recognised the National Transitional Council as "the only authority in Libya" in a statement on its website.
- Italy – On 19 February, Prime Minister Silvio Berlusconi declared his worries about the regional instability. "I haven't yet heard from Gaddafi. The situation is evolving and so I don't feel I should disturb anyone." On 21 February, Berlusconi has called the attacks on protesters "unacceptable." He called on the EU to step in to prevent the situation from escalating into a civil war. Foreign Minister Franco Frattini added on 21 February: "Italy as you know is the closest neighbour of both Tunisia and Libya so we are extremely concerned about the repercussions on the migratory situation in the southern Mediterranean." Frattini spoke of the "possibility of a reform of the constitution that could be taken up soon by the People's Congress." Defence Minister Ignazio La Russa confirmed the dispatch of at least one Italian electronic warfare and reconnaissance naval vessel near Libyan territorial waters. It is believed that some special force soldiers may be aboard the ship, although their purpose was unknown. On 4 April, Italy recognized the National Transitional Council and reportedly dismissed an envoy from Gaddafi. "Tripoli's regime has no future," Frattini told reporters.
- Latvia – The government recognized the National Transitional Council as "the political interlocutor of Libya" on 20 June.
- Luxembourg – Foreign Minister Jean Asselborn said he is "not afraid" of "a dictator who shoots at his own people." Luxembourg sits on the Libya Contact Group and recognized the National Transitional Council on 13 July.
- Macedonia – The government called for a "peaceful and sustainable solution" to the political crisis in the country.
- Malta – On 21 February, Prime Minister Lawrence Gonzi said that the government of Malta was closely watching the events and condemned all forms of violence and bloodshed. Gonzi said the evolving situation was discussed at a cabinet meeting and Malta hoped that the best would come out of this situation for Libya and the region. He added that Libya's territorial integrity was respected. On 27 March, President George Abela expressed optimism that the revolutionary wave in North Africa, including the uprising in Libya, would reduce the amount of illegal immigration to Malta and Southern European countries. "This wave of democratisation should give the people [of North Africa] a future in their own countries," said Abela. On 5 April, Gonzi told a Libyan envoy that Gaddafi must step down and a ceasefire must be honored as a condition for Maltese commitment to any deal between the warring factions in Libya. Gonzi said on 23 August that his government recognised the National Transitional Council as the legitimate government of Libya after previously considering it the Libyan people's legitimate representative but not a governing authority.
- Moldova – The government denied rumors that it has supplied Muammar Gaddafi with Russian- and Soviet-built weaponry.
- Montenegro – On 21 July, the Balkan state recognized the National Transitional Council as Libya's legitimate government.
- Netherlands – The government dispatched a KDC-10 transport to Libya on 22 February. It left later that evening with Dutch and EU citizens. Foreign Minister Uri Rosenthal said he hoped that another aircraft could land the following day. On 13 July, the Netherlands, a member of the Libya Contact Group, recognized the National Transitional Council.
- Norway – In a statement, Foreign Minister Jonas Gahr Støre condemned the violence against "peaceful protesters in Libya, Bahrain and Yemen", saying the protests "are an expression of the people's desire for more participatory democracy. The authorities must respect fundamental human rights such as political, economic and social rights. It is now vital that all parties do their utmost to foster peaceful dialogue on reforms.". Norway is a member of the Libya Contact Group. Støre announced it had officially recognised the National Transitional Council on 23 August.
- Poland – The Foreign Ministry said that they are closely observing the events in Libya. A government aircraft was sent to pick up any Polish citizens in Libya. However, after only fifteen Poles decided to leave the country, the aircraft took British, Danish and Romanian citizens on board. Poland recognized the National Transitional Council on 8 July. It is also a member of the Libya Contact Group.
- Portugal – On 10 March, Portuguese daily Publico reported that Gaddafi would agree to talks on the transition of power, quoting a diplomatic source talking about Foreign Minister Luis Amado's meeting with Gaddafi's envoy in Lisbon. Media also reported Portugal had switched its diplomatic recognition from Gaddafi's government to the National Transitional Council in Benghazi, following France's earlier decision to do so, though the government has not issued an official statement and these reports have not been confirmed as of late April. Portugal voted for the creation of a no-fly zone in Libya in its capacity as a nonpermanent member of the UN Security Council on 17 March.
- Romania – The government sent an aircraft, to evacuate Romanians in Libya. According to the Foreign Ministry, 500 Romanians are in Libya.
- Russia – The government condemned the use of violence against the civilians, and said that Libya has to "respect human rights and international law". Russia abstained from voting on a UN Security Council resolution to create a no-fly zone over Libya rather than use its veto to block the resolution. On 18 July, a government official said Moscow will not recognise the National Transitional Council, believing it would violate the government's policy not to take sides in the civil war. However, on 24 August, President Dmitri Medvedev suggested that the government may revisit its decision, or at least consider establishing diplomatic relations.
- Serbia – Labor and Social Policy Minister Rasim Ljajić stated that Serbia condemns every form of human rights violation, including the events in Libya, but that it is not necessary to create a special policy on the international level. The government organized evacuation of citizens, some 500 were evacuated by planes from Tripoli and another few hundred on ships from Ra's Lanuf port. Serbian planes also evacuated citizens of Bosnia and Herzegovina, Croatia and Ukraine. In total around 1000 people were evacuated and further 250 refused to leave Libya. On 25 August, the Cabinet voted to recognise the National Transitional Council.
  - On 2 March 2011, Serbian Defence Minister Dragan Šutanovac announced that Serbia has suspended all military and economic cooperation with Libya based on the UN decision to impose sanctions on Libya.
  - On 3 March 2011, Foreign Ministry withdrew an agreement on visa-free travel between Libya and Serbia from the ratification process in the Parliament.
- Spain – On 20 February, Foreign Minister Trinidad Jiménez convened a press meeting with fellow EU foreign ministers, at the European Council in the hope of getting them to evacuate the EU's citizens from Libya. All arm sales to Libya were suspended three days later. Spain recognized the National Transitional Council as Libya's sole legitimate representative on 8 June.
- Slovenia – Prime Minister Borut Pahor said that "as the head of the Slovenian Government I condemn the violence used by African governments, especially in Libya, against the people which demand political and social changes. Repression must end; a democratic dialogue must begin about the future of these countries." On 20 July, Slovenia recognized the National Transitional Council as the legitimate representative of Libya.
- Sweden – The government has contributed fighter jets to the international operations in Libya and is a member of the Libya Contact Group.
- Switzerland – The government has stated that Gaddafi's assets in the country will be frozen. It established diplomatic relations with the National Transitional Council on 12 June, though it has not fully recognized the council.
- Ukraine – Foreign Minister Kostyantyn Hryshchenko stated that out of concern for the safety of the more than 2,500 Ukrainians believed to be living and working in Libya at the start of the unrest, his government will not break off relations with Libya. Hryshchenko also said Ukraine was to take a leading role in evacuating nationals of Azerbaijan from Libya. Only 404 Ukrainians had been evacuated as of 4 March, though, the Ministry of Foreign Affairs of Ukraine admitted. Perhaps the most famous Ukrainian to return home from Libya was Halyna Kolotnytska, reportedly Gaddafi's favorite of the several nurses who attended him and a personal confidante of the leader.
- United Kingdom – Prime Minister David Cameron criticised Libya's response to the protests as "unacceptable, counter-productive and wrong." Foreign Secretary William Hague stated that "the United Kingdom condemns what the Libyan government has been doing...and we look to other countries to do the same." The government also announced that in light of the unrest it has decided to revoke some arms export licenses stating that "licenses will not be issued when officials judge that there is a risk that the exports may provoke regional or internal conflicts or be used to facilitate internal repression." The United Kingdom co-sponsored and voted for a UN Security Council resolution to establish a no-fly zone over Libya on 17 March. It recognized the National Transitional Council on 4 June. The UK is a member of the Libya Contact Group.
  - On 27 February, the government revoked the diplomatic immunity for Gaddafi and his family
  - Former Foreign Secretary, David Owen called for a no-fly zone to be imposed immediately. However, the BBC have suggested that the UN would be unlikely to authorise such an action.
  - On 22 February 2011 the Royal Navy ship, HMS Cumberland, was deployed to waters close to Libya in preparation to rescue British nationals. On 23 February, he issued a press release saying that there are "many indications of the structure of the state collapsing in Libya." He also urged the Libyan state to listen to the Libyan people's demands.
  - Chancellor of the Exchequer George Osborne also announced on 27 February that £20 billion of British assets of Gaddafi, his family and "those acting on their behalf " had been frozen "so that they cannot be used against the interests of the Libyan people".

=== Oceania ===
- Australia – Prime Minister Julia Gillard condemned Gaddafi's use of force on protesters, stating "There is no excuse and no tolerance from the Australian government for violence being reaped against peaceful protesters. So our message to the government of Libya, to Colonel Gaddafi, is that they must respect peaceful protest." Foreign Minister Kevin Rudd called for sanctions against Libya. After detailing to Parliament the speech made by Gaddafi on 22 February, Rudd said, "these are not the words of a responsible political leader, these are the words of a dictator out of control". Rudd has also said further steps should be taken, including suspending Libya from the United Nations human rights Commission. During a visit to Egypt he also said, "Libya is in the middle of a civil war and that civil war has now reached the streets of Tripoli. It seems to us increasingly that the days of this regime are numbered. The key thing is to see the unity of international opinion on this matter so that those within Libya know that the world is as one." On 9 June, Australia recognized the National Transitional Council. It is the only Oceanian member of the Libya Contact Group.
- Fiji – On 11 March, Labour Secretary Taito Waqa said his ministry was concerned about Fiji citizens working in Libya, but he did not think the government would be able to track all of them down and assure their safety, as many may have changed employers or locations without advising the Ministry of Labour of Fiji. He warned that any Fiji citizens in Libya who did not advise the government of their home country of their movements were "doing so at their own risk".
- New Zealand – In remarks at a press conference, Prime Minister John Key said the government recognised the "deteriorating situation" in Libya. Key blamed the escalating protests on socioeconomic inequality and "constrained civil liberties" and said that embassy staff in Tripoli were working to locate 26 New Zealanders living in Libya. On 3 March, the New Zealand Foreign Ministry said that all 29 New Zealand nationals in Libya who sought to leave the country had been evacuated with the assistance of the United States, United Kingdom, Canada, and Ireland. Four New Zealanders have remained in Libya voluntarily. On 21 March, Key said Wellington was adopting economic sanctions against Gaddafi's government in line with United Nations Security Council Resolution 1970. On 22 August, Key said New Zealand was recognising the National Transitional Council as Libya's new government and dispatching its ambassador to Egypt to open a diplomatic office in Benghazi. Foreign Minister Murray McCully said the following day that New Zealand would also offer medical supplies to the NTC.
- Papua New Guinea – The Department of Foreign Affairs took note of the devolving situation in Libya in late February after reports of a Papua New Guinean national working in Libya having difficulty leaving the country with his family, according to national media. The United States Navy evacuated the family to Malta on behalf of the Papua New Guinean government by the end of the month as part of a large-scale humanitarian effort.
- Solomon Islands – Foreign Affairs Minister Peter Shannel Agovaka acknowledged the protests in Libya and elsewhere on 27 March, saying, "One thing that these protests have clearly demonstrated is that governments cannot deny the will of the people that calls for recognition of their wellbeing and human rights."

=== Non-UN Member governments ===
- Kosovo – On 26 February, President Behgjet Pacolli stated he "was completely on the side of the people of Libya." On 19 February, the Ministry of Foreign Affairs said that it had identified 50 of its citizens in Libya. In the absence of formal diplomatic relations between Kosovo and Libya, Kosovars in distress were advised to contact Kosovo's embassy in Ankara, Turkey. As of 24 February 27 citizens of Kosovo had been evacuated from Libya. Eight Kosovar students were reported to have left Tripoli on 25 February, and the Foreign Ministry said on 26 February that 20 expatriates were at Tripoli's airport waiting to leave on a Turkish plane. On 27 February, media reports citing foreign ministry officials said that only 24 of 61 Kosovars had left Libya, while the remaining were expected to evacuate soon.
- Palestine – On 2 March, WAFA reported that 104 students from the West Bank and Gaza studying in Libya were requested to leave the country by The Palestinian Authority. It was also reported that the local embassy in Tripoli had asked that any Palestinian in Libya, wishing to leave, apply for a return to the West Bank. On 3 March, The Palestinian Authority's Gen Adnan Damiri made public the fact that 43 PA police officers who had been training in Libya were attempting to get home with help from the PLO's local embassy after PA president Mahmoud Abbas had instructed the embassy to provide the officers with food and shelter. Another 26 officers had been studying at Libya's Naval Academy, but had returned home safely. On 6 March, Ma'an News Agency reported that all the students had left Libya safely.
  - The Gaza Strip's Hamas government issued a statement saying it "strongly condemns massacres, airstrikes and artillery fire against [the] Libyan people by the Libyan regime."
- Republic of China – The Foreign Ministry said it had evacuated 18 ROC nationals from Libya, but one businessman is voluntarily staying in the country. In recognition of the dangerous situation in the North African country, a government spokesman said Taipei is strongly advising its citizens against travel to Libya. On 22 March, Vice Premier Sean Chen called upon Gaddafi to renounce the use of violence and honor a ceasefire.
- Sahrawi Arab Democratic Republic – On 6 March, SPS reported that up to 916 Sahrawi students in Libya (most of them in Tripoli and Benghazi) had returned to the Sahrawi refugee camps. "All the Sahrawi students that were in Libya had come safely to the Sahrawi refugee camps" said Mariem Salek Hamada, SADR's Education Minister. Officials of the Libyan National Transitional Council and Edward Gabriel, a former United States ambassador to Morocco and actual consultant of the Moroccan's kingdom government, had accused the Polisario Front, the national liberation movement of Western Sahara, of sending mercenaries to aid Libyan government forces. Several POLISARIO officials and the government of the SADR have repeatedly denied that allegations.
- Transnistria – The government dismissed rumors that Gaddafi's soldiers were equipped with guns supplied from Transnistria, describing the scenario as "impossible" because Transnistria is unrecognized by the World Trade Organization and as such cannot legally sell weapons to the Libyan government.
- Vatican City – Archbishop Nuncio Silvano Maria Tomasi said the Holy See has asked that Gaddafi "put an end to violence against civilians". Pope Benedict XVI said the unrest in the Arab world, including in Libya, should be resolved. L'Osservatore Romano, a major Vatican City newspaper linked to the clergy, called Gaddafi "merciless" and sharply condemned violence against the Libyan citizenry.

== NGOs and Militant Groups ==
Al-Qaeda in the Islamic Maghreb condemned Gaddafi and expressed solidarity with the protesters. "We were pained by the carnage and the cowardly massacres carried out by the killer of innocents Gaddafi against our people and our unarmed Muslim brothers who only came to lift his oppression, his disbelief, his tyranny and his might." It also said: "[We] will do whatever we can to help you, with power from Allah, because your fight is the fight of every Muslim who loves Allah and His Messenger. It is time for the impostor, sinful, hard-hearted bastard Gaddafi to meet the same end as Hosni Mubarak and Zine El Abidine Ben Ali. We declare our support and aid to the Libyan revolution in its legitimate demands, and we assure our people in Libya that we are with you and we will not let you down." The statement came amid warnings by the Libyan deputy foreign minister that the group has organised an Islamic emirate in Derna, though some residents of the city claimed this was not true and said the Libyan government was trying to "scare Europe".

Avaaz.org, an international civic organisation, initiated an appeal, to international officials to impose specific actions to stop the violence against civilians and prosecute violators, which collected 400,000 signatures as of 23 February.

Doctors Without Borders issued a statement saying that while there were members in Libya working with wounded protesters more needed to be sent with medical supplies, including necessary surgical materials, and faced difficulties due to blocks on entering the country. Arjan Hehenkamp, the director of operations, said: "All information we receive points towards a critical situation in terms of medical care for the injured. We need to be working alongside Libyan health professionals to care for people who have been caught in the violent clashes over recent days. It is unacceptable that medical staff and supplies are kept away from people who need them."

Juventus was said to be concerned about a 7.5 percent stake in the company owned by the Libyan Arab Foreign Investment Company, otherwise known as Lafico. The shares in Juventus fell 2.3 percent to 84.8 euro on 25 February.

The London School of Economics came under fire for its links with Saif al-Islam Gaddafi. After he got a PhD in 2008 the Gaddafi International Charity and Development Foundation (GICDF) gave the school a gift of £1.5m the following year. A professor, David Held, who was a beneficiary of the gift was also appointed a trustee of GICDF before the gift was formally accepted. The LSE was also said to be investigation allegations of plagiarism and said that the degree can be "revoked if there are substantiated concerns about the manner in which it was attained – for example if there is a later discovery of plagiarism."

The president of the online Tuareg community Tamust said there was consternation among the Tuareg over Gaddafi's precarious position, as many see Gaddafi as a lonely advocate for the Saharan tribe on the international stage. He warned that it would be "legitimate" for the Tuareg to turn back to violence if governments did not address their demands.

On 5 April, Al Jazeera and the Committee to Protect Journalists called on Gaddafi's regime to release three Al Jazeera journalists allegedly being held by Tripoli. The statement from Al Jazeera on 5 April accused the regime of deliberately targeting journalists attempting to report on the war and said that "Libyan authorities have not provided any information about why or where the journalists are being held".

== Individuals ==
Egyptian Islamist Sheikh Yusuf al-Qaradawi declared his support for the rebels led by the National Transitional Council in the 2011 Libyan civil war, urging Arab nations to recognize them and "to confront the tyranny of the regime in Tripoli". He suggested weapons be sent to the rebels to assist the, and said "Our Islamic nation should stand against injustice and corruption and I urge the Egyptian government to extend a helping hand to Libyan people and not to Gaddafi." He subsequently issued a fatwa that any Libyan soldier who can shoot Gaddafi should do so "to rid Libya of him."

A French MEP and president of the Front National, Marine Le Pen claimed that the confrontations in Libya pertain to a civil war in which France's interest is not to interfere. She regretted the haste of the French diplomacy which had "prematurely recognized the National Transitional Council which speaks in the name of the Libyan rebels".

United States Senator John McCain, a former presidential candidate, said the U.S. and other states should recognize the National Transitional Council while on a visit to Benghazi in late April. "[The rebels] have earned this right and Gaddafi has forfeited it by waging war on his own people," said McCain, who also expressed concern that the situation could provide an opening for Islamic extremists to gain a foothold in Libya.

== Travel advisories and evacuations ==
=== Overview ===
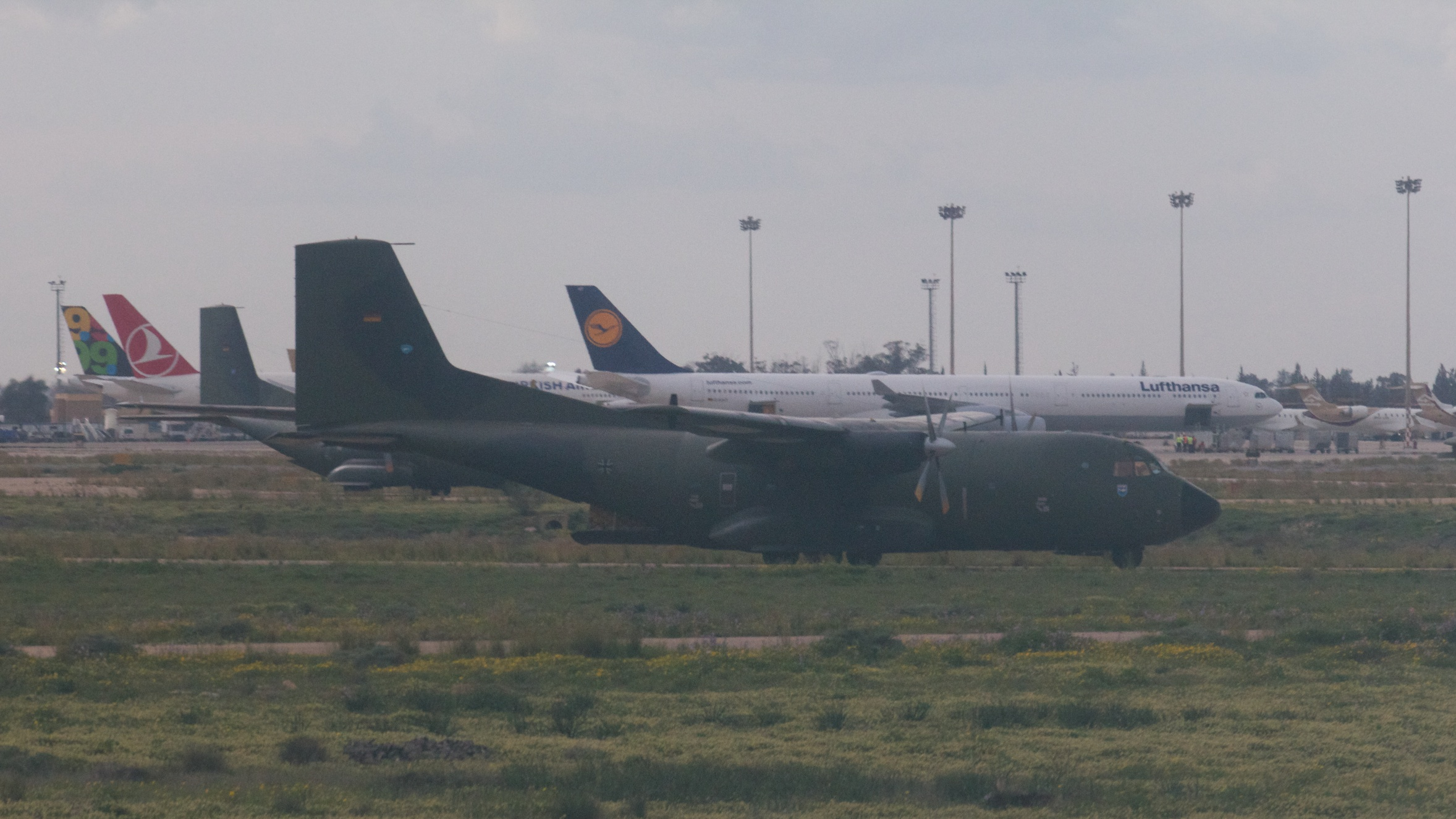
On 22 February, two Luftwaffe C-160s are some of the first foreign military airplanes allowed to land at Tripoli International Airport. Commercial planes from Lufthansa, British Airways, Turkish Airlines, Afriqiyah Airways and Libyan Airlines can be seen in the background.

During the uprising, many states evacuated their citizens. Various states including Britain, the United States, Germany, Italy, France, Pakistan, the Netherlands, Turkey, Peru, China, India, Sri Lanka, Nepal, Bangladesh and Greece put into place arrangements for the evacuation of their citizens from the country on 23 February. However evacuation appeared to be difficult due to "chaos" at the international airport in Tripoli as well as a "destroyed" runway at Benina International Airport and the temporary closure of all Libyan ports. Consequently, many international flights, including those of British Airways, were cancelled, although others appeared to operate. Further reports indicated that Libyan harbours in many cities were closed. To address that problem, many governments have sent civilian and military aircraft and ships to evacuate their citizens. TV coverage indicated that the airport in Malta had turned into a hub for various European rescue missions. Both Italy and Bulgaria joined China in warning against all travel to Libya while Spanish Foreign Minister Trinidad Jimenez said counterparts from around the 27-state EU were considering pulling people out, particularly from the eastern opposition stronghold of Benghazi.

May expats and local refugees were fleeing the violence of Tripoli by road, as many as 4,000 people have been crossing the Libya-Tunisia border daily. Among those escaping the violence are foreign nationals including Egyptians, Tunisians, Vietnamese, Chinese and Turks, as well as war-displaced Libyans. During the uprising many countries evacuated its citizens. On 25 February 500 passengers, mostly Americans, sailed into Malta after a rough eight-hour journey from Tripoli and two-day wait for the seas to calm down. A planned evacuation flight for Canadian citizens from Tripoli, for which 213 people had stated they need to board, was grounded in Rome due to lack of coverage by the airline's insurance. A Canadian Foreign Affairs official described the "deteriorating security situation" in Tripoli as the reason for the cancellation. Greece's Foreign Ministry completed an air evacuation in different cities of Libya for Greek and Cypriot citizens by the use of C-130 military transport planes provided by the Greek Air Force.

=== Timeline of the evacuations ===
On 22 February, British Foreign Secretary William Hague announced that HMS Cumberland had been redeployed to Libyan waters where she will assist in the evacuation of British citizens and other nationals. The Cumberland entered the Port of Benghazi on 24 February, leaving the same day for Malta with an international collection of passengers that included British, Commonwealth, European and American nationals. Cumberland is returning to Benghazi to continue evacuations of foreign nationals.

India has launched a multi-pronged sea and air rescue operation to evacuate the 18,000 Indian nationals currently trapped in Libya. Two Indians have died in the clashes between pro and anti-Gaddafi forces. Two aircraft from Air India will shuttle passengers from Libya to Delhi and Mumbai. A chartered passenger vessel will shuttle Indian citizens from Libya to Malta. The Indian Navy vessels INS Jalashwa, INS Aditya and INS Mysore have been deployed to the region.

Italy sent in an airlift to rescue its 1,500 residents in Libya on 22 February. The Netherlands said it wanted to evacuate 100 of its citizens and prepared an aircraft for the evacuation. It also sent the navy frigate Tromp to lend support by sea. The UK's Royal Navy frigate HMS Cumberland was sent to international waters near Libya to help with the evacuation if necessary.

Greece, Germany, Austria, Portugal and other EU nations planned or conducted airlifts. A Spanish military plane was already on standby on 22 February.

On 23 February, Turkey has evacuated 5099 nationals within 72 hours of evacuations with charter flights and ferries organized by Turkish government. Also, Turkey readied 2 more frigates to make journey to Libya. The ships that will sail on Wednesday will be escorted by a helicopter and special teams to serve as a deterrent against possible attacks. Both Portugal and Austria sent military planes to Tripoli to evacuate their nationals and those of other EU countries as companies with major interests in the country including British energy giant BP and Italy's Eni and Finmeccanica were also preparing to repatriate their employees. Various states including Britain, Chile, the United States, Germany, Spain, Australia, Greece, Portugal, Germany, France, Austria, Italy, France, Serbia, the Netherlands, Peru, India, China, Sri Lanka, Nepal, and Bangladesh put into place arrangements for the evacuation of their citizens from the country on 23 February.

The Brazilian Government deployed a ship from the Greek port of Piraeus on to fetch 180 of an estimated 600 of its nationals in Benghazi and transported them to Malta, from where they traveled to Brazil. Brazil then obtained permission from the Libyan government for five flights to land in Tripoli to rescue the remainder of its citizens. China was sending Greek ships to evacuate 15,000 of the 30,000 Chinese citizens in Libya. Canada had initially chartered a private aircraft to pick up Canadians and now have a Boeing C-17 Globemaster III from the No. 429 Squadron RCAF on standby in Germany to fly to Tripoli via Rome if and when needed. The Governor General of Canada's plane (Bombardier Challenger 600 from No. 412 Squadron RCAF) is also in Rome (there for state visit) and is on standby as well.

India launched a multi-pronged sea and air rescue operation to evacuate its 18,000 nationals trapped in Libya. Two aircraft from Air India shuttled passengers from Libya to Delhi and Mumbai. A chartered passenger vessel will also shuttle Indian citizens from Libya to Egypt or Malta. The Indian Navy vessels INS Jalashwa, INS Aditya and INS Mysore (D60) are being deployed to the region. Two Indians also died during the protests.

On the evening of 25 February a joint British and German operation consisting of two British and two German military transport planes evacuated 22 Germans and about 100 other Europeans, mostly British oil workers from the airport at Nafurah to Crete.

On 27 February, two Royal Air Force C-130 Hercules aircraft with British Special Forces evacuated approximately 100 foreign nationals, mainly UK. Irish, German and Romanian oil workers, to Malta from the desert south of Benghazi, one of which was shot at and suffered some damage, but no one was injured. The same day Gaddafi's trusted nurse Galyna Kolotnytska arrived back in Ukraine.

In the afternoon of 27 February, it is reported that 57 Nepalis, employed to work in Libya, landed at the Tribhuvan International Airport, but over 1,300 Nepalese nationals are yet to be rescued from the chaos in Libya.

By 28 February, China had already evacuated nearly 29,000 nationals by land, sea and air, using both Crete and Malta as staging posts. Two vessels docked in Valletta, Malta bringing 3,200 workers, mostly Chinese.

By 2 March, The total number of people evacuated by Turkey reached 22,554 who are carried on 67 planes, 5 ships, 1 frigate, as well as other ferries organized by the private sector. A total of 3870 of the people evacuated are foreign nationals with the rest being Turkish citizens.

Various petroleum companies evacuated their expatriate employees. BP said that it was preparing to evacuate about 40 expatriate workers from Libya, where it has suspended onshore oil exploration due to the political unrest. Norway's Statoil said it already has started pulling out a handful of international staff and has closed its Tripoli corporate office. Shell said it had completed a withdrawal of its staff on 22 February. Brazilian conglomerate Odebrecht said they were putting into place mandatory evacuations for the nearly 5,000 staff they have in Libya.

Other oil companies also withdrew their employees to ensure their safety, including: Gazprom, Shell, Suncor, Pertamina and BP. Other companies that decided to evacuate their employees include Siemens and Russian Railways.

About 15 Danes who were in Libya working for FLSmidth left on 24 February.

== Protests against the government of Libya ==
A crowd of about 250 Libyans called on the ambassador to Malta, Saadun Suayeh, to resign and for the Libyan embassy to replace the current Libyan flag with the older Libyan monarchy flag. Suayeh said he would not give in to demands. He stated that Libyan leader Muammar Gaddafi "should not go", adding "His (Gaddafi's) presence for the time being is definitely a guarantee for the country's unity,".

About 200 protesters gathered outside the consulate in Istanbul in support of the protesters.

In Albert Square, Manchester in the United Kingdom, over 100 people demonstrated in support of the protesters. In London, protesters gathered outside the embassy. One man scaled the building unchallenged and removed the Libyan flag and replaced it with the flag of the Kingdom of Libya.

Date	City	Country	Notes
17 February	Alexandria	Egypt	
17 February	London	UK	
19 February	Geneva	Switzerland	
19 February	Washington, DC	US	
19 February	Atlanta, GA	US	
19 February	Kansas City, MO	US	
20 February	Toronto, ON	Canada	
20 February	Alexandria	Egypt	
20 February	Portland, OR	US	
21 February	Edmonton	Canada	
21 February	Cairo	Egypt	
21 February	Marseilles	France	
21 February	Valletta	Malta	
21 February	London	UK	
21 February	Manchester	UK	
21 February	Lansing, MI	US	
21 February	Seattle, WA	US	
22 February	Belgrade	Serbia	Libyans stoned the embassy.
22 February	Kyiv	Ukraine	
22 February	Melbourne	Australia	
22 February	Brandon, MB	Canada	
22 February	Ottawa, ON	Canada	
22 February	Montreal, QC	Canada	
22 February	Paris	France	
22 February	Gaza City	Palestine	
22 February	Berlin	Germany	
22 February	Amman	Jordan	
22 February	Kuala Lumpur	Malaysia	
22 February	Budapest	Hungary	
22 February	Tunis	Tunisia	
22 February	Istanbul	Turkey	
22 February	Sacramento, CA	US	
22 February	Orlando, FL	US	
22 February	Pullman, WA	US	
23 February	Sydney	Australia	
23 February	Wellington	New Zealand	
23 February	Cairo	Egypt	
23 February	Athens	Greece	
23 February	Rome	Italy	Protesters said they would stay there till Gaddafi leaves.
23 February	Tokyo	Japan	
23 February	Beirut	Lebanon	
23 February	Edinburgh	UK	
23 February	London	UK	
23 February	Denver, CO	US	
23 February	Columbia, MO	US	
24 February	Detroit, MI	US	
25 February	New York City, NY	US	
26 February	Valletta	Malta	
26 February	San Francisco, CA	US	
26 February	Glasgow	UK	Stop the War said that: "It is very important that people here show their support for the protesters. Let's mobilise and unite in our thousands to send the message that we stand in solidarity with those struggling for a better world."
26 February	Chicago, IL	US	

=== UK squatting by 'Topple the Tyrants' ===
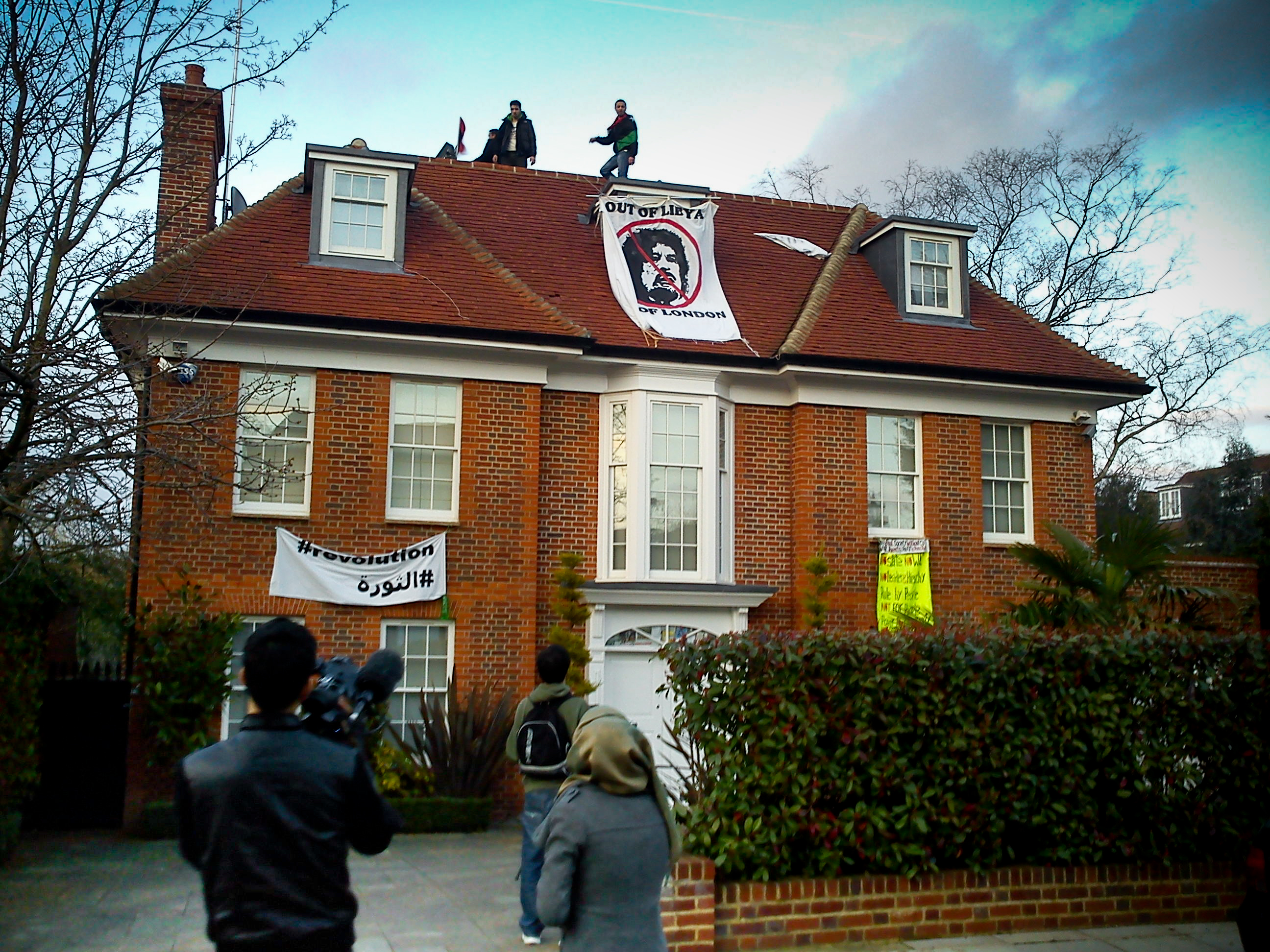
Topple the Tyrants occupation of Saif al-Islam Gaddafi's house

Topple the Tyrants is an activist group which squatted a London home belonging to Saif al-Islam, son of Libyan leader Muammar Gaddafi, in March 2011. The home the group occupied is an eight-bedroom mansion in Hampstead Garden Suburb, London, which had been listed by Saif as for sale for €12.75 million as the 2011 Libyan civil war began.

As of 10 March 2011, Scotland Yard had stated the issue was being treated as a "civil matter", and that no arrests had yet been made.

== Mediation proposals ==
There were several peace mediation prospects during the crisis. The South African government also floated the idea of an African Union-led mediation effort to prevent "civil war".

Another initiative came from Venezuelan president Hugo Chávez. Though Gaddafi accepted in principle a proposal by Chávez to negotiate a settlement between the opposition and the Libyan government, Saif al-Islam, later voiced some skepticism to the proposal. On news of Gaddafi in principle accepting the Chávez's proposal for international mediation, there was a worldwide decrease in oil and gold prices. The proposal is also under consideration by the Arab League, according to chairman Amr Moussa. The Libyan opposition was cold to the proposal, saying that while they are willing to save lives, any deal would have to involve Gaddafi stepping down, while the US and French governments dismissed any initiative that would allow Gaddafi to remain in power.

== International aid ==
On 2 March, the Royal Navy destroyer HMS York had arrived in Benghazi carrying medical supplies and other humanitarian aid donated by the Swedish government. The medical supplies, a donation to the Benghazi Medical Centre, were supposed to have been flown direct to Benghazi airport but when the airport was closed down, they were diverted to Malta. They were transferred from the airport to the frigate at short notice by the Armed Forces of Malta. On 8 March, a convoy of trucks from the United Nations World Food Programme (WFP) had entered Libya and was due to arrive in the eastern port city of Benghazi on the same day, the WFP said in a statement. A convoy carrying seventy metric tonnes of high-energy date bars crossed the Egyptian border overnight on its way to the eastern port. On 7 March, U.N. aid coordinator Valerie Amos stated that fighting across Libya meant that more than a million people fleeing or inside the country needed humanitarian aid.

== Financial markets ==
Regional financial stock-market indices fell on 20 February on concern of spreading instability. Global stock markets fell the next day. On 22 February, crude oil and bonds climbed while Asian stocks fell on concern for stability in OPEC-member state Libya. US stock-market futures also dropped on the first working day following the aerial bombardments of protesters.

On 27 February, Saudi Arabia's Tadawul stock market index fell to a six-month low along with other regional Arab markets due to the clashes in Libya that caused a price increase in oil and amid fears that a recovery from the 2008 financial crisis would slow. The following day Asian stock also declined because of the unrest.

== Media ==
Libya's state television made no mention of the anti-government protests in the eastern provinces of the country, and continued with its usual programming until 17 February. During the morning news bulletin on 16 February, state TV repeatedly showed demonstrations in support of Colonel Gaddafi, which were about 200 to 300 strong and allegedly "from across the country". At one point a crowd could be heard chanting anti-Al Jazeera slogans. The Qatar-based outlet channel had started broadcasting footage from a pro-Gaddafi demonstration live from Sirte, Gaddafi's home town, that numbered 1,000. State TV also showed live coverage of a speech by Gaddafi from the previous evening, in which he denounced both the United States and their alleged "Zionist" allies in front of a cheering crowd on 16 February. It also began broadcasting images of burning buildings and cars in what viewers said was the first time government media had acknowledged the growing unrest in the east, which it suggested was spreading to the point that the government had no choice but to address it directly, possibly even with force of arms on the 20th. Gaddafi was shown with his supporters during a rally in Nalut on 19 February.

Libya's privately owned and London-based electronic newspaper al-Yawm, which reports favourably on Gaddafi's son, Saif al-Islam, was the only Libyan source of any kind to freely report on the anti-Gaddafi protests in both the cities of Benghazi and Bayda. The paper usually carries balanced, un-opinionated reporting published a total of 16 articles on the anti-Gaddafi regime protests, quoting allegedly tapped "trustworthy" sources in Benghazi and Bayda, and carried no reports on the pro-Gaddafi demonstrations in Tripoli. Four protesters were killed in Bayda, the Al-Yawm paper said, as a crowd attempted to storm the Internal Security Building, set fire two cars and the burnt down headquarters of the local traffic police on 16 February.

According to the state-owned Al-Shams and Al-Jamahiriya newspapers, mobile phone users were sent a text message warning them against taking to the streets on 17 February as a result of "directives from the state security service", which is the body that monitors and controls the country's two mobile telecommunications networks. The front page of Al-Jamahiriya was dedicated to pro-Gaddafi demonstrations and his timely public appearance at the Ahly football Club in Tripoli the day before, while state-owned Al-Shams led exclusively with coverage of this event. It later added that additional security forces had been bussed in to "control" the situation and that they had "out-of-town" accents "and foreign agents".

Quryna, which had once been a part of Saif-al-Islam's Al-Ghad Media Corporation but was taken over by the state in 2010, carried an upbeat report about order being restored in Benghazi. One article reported on the families of "17 February martyrs" who met Gaddafi and condemned the protests.

Domestically, BBC News reported on 18 February, that the "leading pro-government newspaper", Al-Zahf Al-Akhdar, has adopted a seemingly uncompromising stance towards the protests, stating:

Any risk from these minuscule groups [protesters] – this people and the noble revolutionary power will violently and thunderously respond, ... The people's power, the Jamahiriya [system of rule], the revolution, and Colonel Gaddafi are all red lines and those who try to cross or come near these lines are suicidal and playing with fire.

State TV broadcast images of Colonel Gaddafi paying a brief visit to Tripoli's Green Square, early on 18 February, during which supporters chanted pro-government slogans. BBC News stated that "diplomats reported the use of heavy weapons in Benghazi," on 18 February. The government imposed a near-total news blackout, and foreign reporters are banned from the country, although at least one BBC reporter has ignored this and is broadcasting from opposition controlled Benghazi, as was Al Jazeera. The British newspaper, the Independent Online, reported on 20 February that at least one state-run newspaper, Al-Zahf Alakhdar, blamed the protests on Zionism.

== Additional developments ==
=== No-fly zone ===
Prime Minister David Cameron of the United Kingdom proposed the idea of a no-fly zone to prevent Gaddafi from airlifting mercenaries and using his military aeroplanes and armoured helicopters against civilians. Italy said it would support a no-fly zone if it was backed by the United Nations. U.S. Secretary of Defense Robert M. Gates was cautious on this option, warning the US Congress that a no-fly zone would have to begin with an attack on Libya's air defenses. This proposal was rejected by Russia and China. On 7 March, US Ambassador to NATO Ivo Daalder announced that NATO decided to step up surveillance missions to 24 hours a day. On the same day it was reported that one UN diplomat confirmed to AFP on condition of anonymity that France and Britain were drawing up a resolution on the no-fly zone and it go before the United Nations Security Council as early as this week.

On 8 March, the GCC issued a joint statement, calling on the UN Security Council to impose a no-fly zone on Libya to protect civilians. On Saturday 12 March the foreign ministers of the Arab League agreed to ask the UN Security Council to impose a no-fly zone over Libya. The Group of Eight met in Paris on 14 March to discuss their potential support of a no-fly zone. On 17 March, the United Nations Security Council voted to impose a no-fly zone, and other measures, to protect the Libyan people.

=== Relations with the rebels ===
On 4 March, one British diplomat, accompanied by a Secret Intelligence Service officer and six Special Forces troops were landed by helicopter close to Benghazi. However, they were quickly surrounded by the local militia who demanded to know who they were and what they were doing. They claimed that they were unarmed but their weapons were discovered and they were detained. Then Richard Northern, the British ambassador to Libya, was purportedly recorded having a conversation with one of the rebel leaders to try to solve the situation (this tape was played on Libyan state television). On 6 March, the British were released but their weapons were confiscated. The British left Libya by the frigate HMS Cumberland, which docked briefly in Benghazi before setting sail to Malta.

On 7 March, Robert Fisk of The Independent reported that the US government had asked Saudi Arabia if it could supply weapons to the rebels in Benghazi. The Saudis have been told that the opponents of Gaddafi need anti-tank rockets, mortars and surface-to-air missiles. However, on 8 March the US State Department denied the reports and that the United States would arm opposition groups without explicit international authorization. It maintained that United Nations Security Council Resolution 1970, which imposed international sanctions on Libya including an arms embargo, applied to both the Gaddafi regime and the rebel groups.

U.S. global security consultancy Stratfor reported that Egypt's special operations force Unit 777 and Tunisian volunteers were in Libya fighting for the rebels.

On 10 March, France became the first nation to recognize the National Transitional Council as the sole representative of Libya.

=== Gaddafi's death ===
On 20 October 2011, Muammar Gaddafi was killed while attempting to flee the Battle of Sirte at the end of the war. NATO forces involved in the military intervention in Libya were among the participants in the battle, and warplanes and at least one unmanned aerial vehicle operated by coalition partners struck Gaddafi's convoy, leaving him seriously injured and forcing him to abandon his retreat from the city. Opposition fighters located Gaddafi and took him into custody later that day, but he died from a gunshot wound to the head before reaching the hospital in Misrata.

Many countries responded to Gaddafi's death by pronouncing it to mark the end of "tyranny" in Libya, with some world leaders even describing it as the end of the war. However, a few countries, such as Venezuela, Russia, met the news with anger, calling his death an "outrage".

== Retrospective assessments ==
In 2016, U.S. President Barack Obama stated that not preparing for a post-Gaddafi Libya was the "worst mistake" of his presidency.

In 2015 through 2016 the British parliament's Foreign Affairs Select Committee conducted an extensive and highly critical inquiry into the British involvement in the civil war. It concluded that the early threat to civilians had been overstated and that the significant Islamist element in the rebel forces had not been recognised, due to an intelligence failure. By summer 2011 the initial limited intervention to protect Libyan civilians had become a policy of regime change. However that new policy did not include proper support and for a new government, leading to a political and economic collapse in Libya and the growth of ISIL in North Africa. The former Prime Minister David Cameron was ultimately responsible for this British policy failure.
