= Libya–United Kingdom relations =

- Libya: United Kingdom

Relations between Libya and the United Kingdom were initially close and positive after the British Armed Forces helped rebel forces to topple Muammar Gaddafi's regime in the 2011 Libyan Civil War. British officials have visited Libya several times since then, including two visits by Prime Minister David Cameron when large crowds turned out to welcome him. The British Armed Forces are also helping to train Libya's National Army as part of wider cooperation on security matters. Security conditions have deteriorated since 2014, when the United Kingdom suspended operations from their embassy in Tripoli, into a second civil war. In June 2022, the United Kingdom re-opened its embassy in Tripoli.

== History ==
=== Colonial years and Kingdom of Libya (1943–1969) ===
Libya was an Italian colony for much of the early 20th century until it was invaded in World War II, with Tripolitania and Cyrenaica being occupied by the UK (British Military Administration of Libya) and Fezzan occupied by France (Fezzan-Ghadames Military Territory). After the war, the United Nations organised negotiations to decolonise Libya. These were successful and on 24 December 1951, the United Kingdom of Libya was established under the leadership of King Idris.

Under Idris, Libya maintained a close relationship with the UK even after London's relations with other Arab nations soured due to the 1956 Suez Crisis.

=== Libya under Gaddafi (1969–2011) ===
Relations after Muammar Gaddafi's 1969 coup were extremely poor, with Gaddafi's government taking a combative anti-Western stance and developing weapons of mass destruction. Poor relations were reinforced by direct confrontations such as the murder of Yvonne Fletcher, the 1986 United States bombing of Libya and the destruction of Pan Am Flight 103.

Despite these setbacks, relations began to improve during the 1990s, and peaked in December 2003 when Libya announced that they would abandon their weapons of mass destruction programmes. UK Prime Minister Tony Blair then travelled to Tripoli, met with Gaddafi and declared a "new relationship" between the countries.

Afterwards, Libyan police officers were trained in Britain in English and security procedures, e.g. Criminal Justice Procedures and Stop & Search Procedures and Techniques.

Relations between Libya and the UK soured in 2009 however after the release of Abdelbaset al-Megrahi, who was given a hero's welcome in Libya, due to the fact that the UK was deeply embarrassed by repeated accusations that Megrahi had been traded in exchange for Libyan oil and gas. As a result of this distancing from Libya, Britain refused to send its ambassador to the celebrations for the 40th anniversary of the Libyan Revolution. With the aim to create close ties with the intelligence agencies of the Arab world, British intelligence agencies helped their Libyan counterparts in their operations against Abdelhakim Belhaj and other Libyan dissidents.

==== Civil war ====
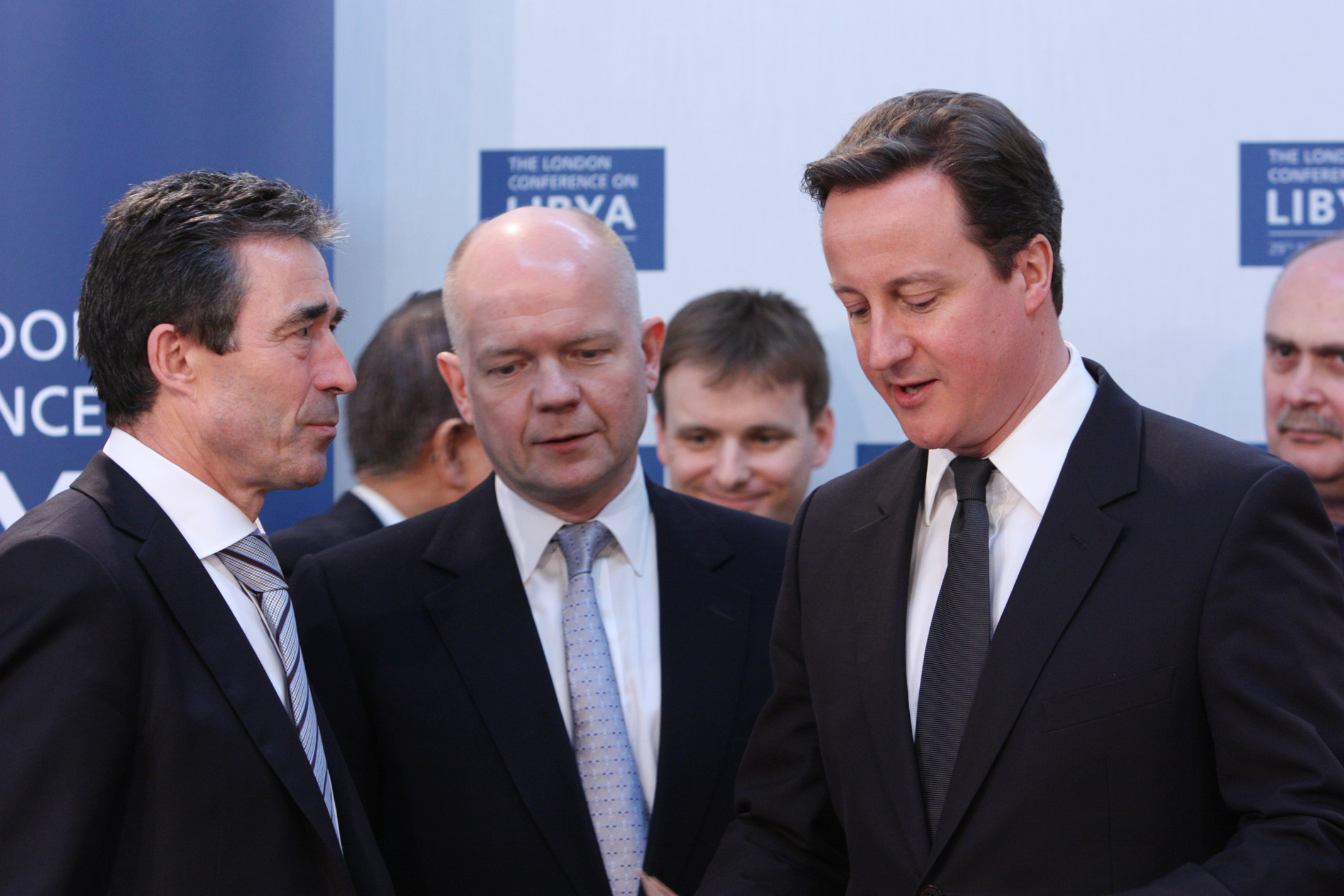
UK Prime Minister David Cameron and Foreign Secretary William Hague speaking to NATO Secretary General Anders Fogh Rasmussen at the London Conference on Libya on 29 March 2011

Although relations had improved under the leaderships of Tony Blair and Gordon Brown, they once again soured in 2011 with the outbreak of the Libyan Civil War. UK Prime Minister David Cameron condemned the "appalling and unacceptable" violence used against protesters, and anti-Gaddafi protests broke out at the Libyan embassy in London. The UK froze the Gaddafi regime's assets in the country and joined France in leading the push for military intervention against Libyan government forces. A group called "Topple the Tyrants" occupied Saif al-Islam Gaddafi's London mansion and called on the Gaddafi family to leave Libya.

After weeks of lobbying by the UK and its allies, on 17 March 2011 the United Nations Security Council approved military intervention in Libya, and two days later the UK and the United States fired more than 110 Tomahawk missiles at regime targets before sending in fighter jets to protect civilians. The Libyan government condemned the intervention as colonialism by its "crusader enemy" and claimed the UK's bombs were targeting civilians.

The UK expelled Gaddafi's ambassador in May and cut its last ties with Gaddafi's Libya on 27 July, by revoking its diplomatic recognition of the Gaddafi regime and transferring it to the National Transitional Council. The Libyan chargé d'affaires and all remaining embassy staff were expelled from the country and its embassy was shut down.

The Gaddafi regime remained defiant even as it was bombed by UK forces; when the 2011 England riots broke out in August 2011, the regime's Deputy Foreign Minister Khaled Kaim urged Cameron to step down saying that "David Cameron has lost all legitimacy and must go", mockingly echoing the comments made by Cameron about Gaddafi. The statement also called for international military intervention in the UK, and Libyan state TV reported false claims that the British government was using Irish and Scottish mercenaries against rioters.

==== LSE Gaddafi links scandal ====
In the wake of the civil war, a scandal erupted at the London School of Economics and Political Science over its ties to the Gaddafi regime. As a result of the revelations the LSE's Director, Sir Howard Davies resigned on 3 March 2011 citing "errors of judgement".

=== Post-Gaddafi Libya (2011-present) ===
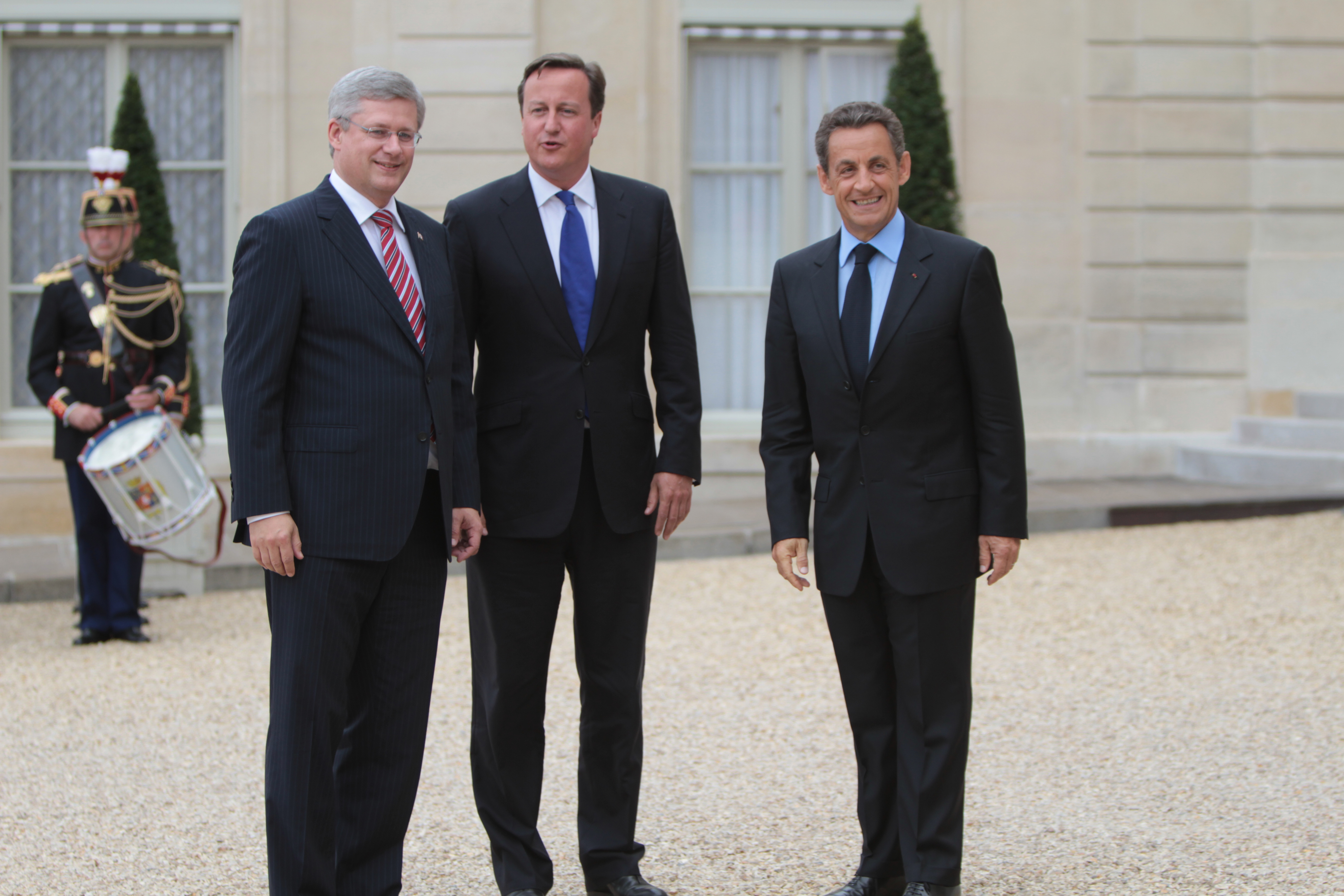
David Cameron at the International Conference in Support of the New Libya in September 2011, where the Friends of Libya group was created

The UK formally recognised the rebel National Transitional Council (NTC) as the government of Libya in July 2011, expelling the Gaddafi regime's remaining diplomats and inviting the NTC to nominate an ambassador and take over the Libyan embassy in London, which they did on 10 August.

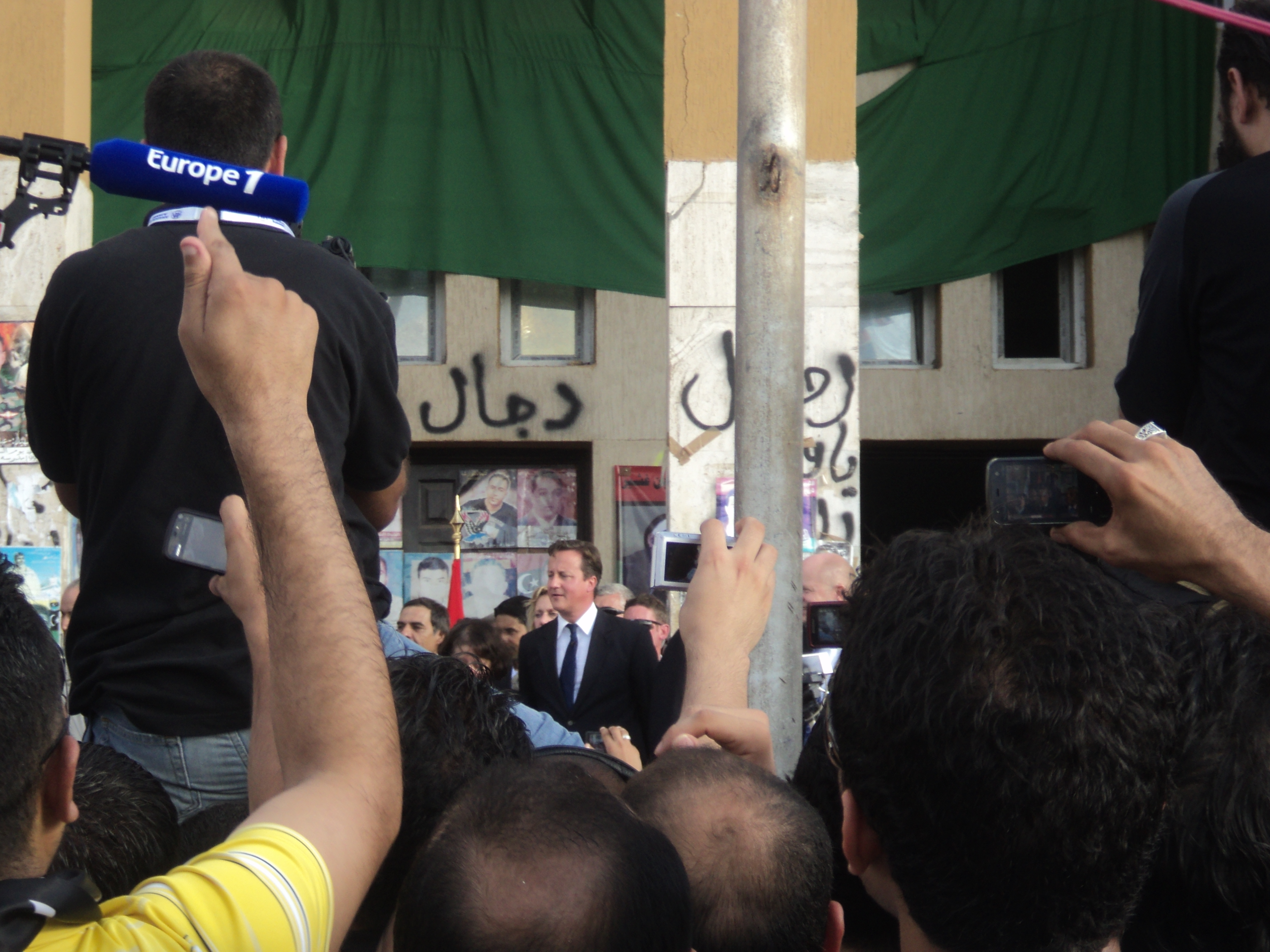
David Cameron visiting Benghazi in September 2011

Following Gaddafi's ousting, UK Prime Minister David Cameron visited Libya with French President Nicolas Sarkozy and was greeted in Benghazi by a crowd of thousands who cheered as he addressed them, saying "It is great to be in free Libya." Cameron pledged support for the new government in rebuilding Libyan infrastructure, and Gaddafi regime assets worth billions of dollars were unfrozen and handed over to the NTC.

Gaddafi's ousting prompted British police to reopen their investigations into the murder of Yvonne Fletcher and the Lockerbie bombing. The NTC promised to cooperate with the investigation and in December 2012 Libya's ambassador to the UK announced that all files relating to Lockerbie would be released, although likely not until Libya's new constitution has been completed and a permanent government is in place. This was followed in January 2013 by the news that Scottish police officers would be visiting Libya to conduct their investigation.

In January 2013, the UK government issued a travel warning urging British citizens to leave the Libyan city of Benghazi due to an unspecified "specific and imminent threat to westerners". Libyan Prime Minister Ali Zeidan said the move was an "exaggeration" but that he could understand the motivations behind it. David Cameron again visited Libya on 31 January, meeting with Zeidan as well as President of Congress Mohammed Magariaf. He promised further cooperation in training Libya's security forces and said that "the British people want to stand with you."

The United Kingdom suspended operations from their embassy in Tripoli on 2 August 2014 due to a rise in post-civil war violence in the city. Diplomatic relations with Libya were retained, as embassy staff continued to work from within neighbouring Tunisia. Embassy staff tweeted that fighting had spread to areas near the embassy and it was unsafe to operate there, but they hoped to return as soon as possible. However the situation developed into an ongoing second Libyan Civil War.

==== Second civil war ====
In July 2015 the Foreign Affairs Select Committee started an investigation into the UK government's intervention in Libya, and subsequent collapse of the Libyan government. The chairman of the committee, Crispin Blunt said "It has turned out to be a catastrophe for the people of Libya. And now it is a growing problem for us, with our undoubted enemy ISIS beginning to establish control of areas of Libya. Plus the migration crisis – any area where state authority collapses obviously poses problems for us all over the world."

In 2018 Foreign Office minister Alistair Burt, who had dealt with Libyan affairs from 2010 to 2013, said:

We rushed to build capacity to enable the new government to govern. But it was all done in the absence of a political settlement which reflected both the interests of the warring elites and the aspirations of the Libyan population. We should have prioritised the politics over technocratic state-building.
