= Contents of the United States diplomatic cables leak (analysis of individual leaders) =

The United States diplomatic cables leaked by WikiLeaks contained personal analyses of world leaders by U.S. ambassadors in their corresponding countries and officials of foreign governments. These details proved quite embarrassing to both those leaders as well as the U.S. officials who worked on the cables.

== Afghanistan ==
Hamid Karzai, President of Afghanistan, was called "paranoid" by diplomats. The diplomats stated that he is considered "an extremely weak man who did not listen to facts but was instead easily swayed by anyone who came to report even the most bizarre stories or plots against him".

== Argentina ==
Cristina Kirchner and Néstor Kirchner, former Presidents of Argentina, are described as "paranoid regarding power" and showing "ineptitude for foreign policy". Also it asks for information on the mental state and health of the current president of Argentina.

== Australia ==
Kevin Rudd, former Prime Minister of Australia, was described as "generally competent". Other text described him as a "control freak" and "a micro-manager obsessed with managing the media cycle rather than engaging in collaborative decision making". Diplomats also criticized Rudd's foreign-policy record.

== Austria ==
- Werner Faymann, Chancellor of Austria, was criticised for a lack of interest in foreign politics.
- Norbert Darabos, Minister of National Defense, was criticised for a lack of interest in foreign politics and international security.
- Michael Spindelegger, Foreign Minister, was criticised for only caring about the expansion of Austrian businesses.

== Azerbaijan ==
- Mehriban Aliyeva, Aliyev's wife, according to U.S. embassy dispatches, was said to have "so much plastic surgery that it is possible to confuse her for one of her daughters from a distance, but that she can barely still move her face". U.S. diplomats also describe Aliyeva as "poorly informed about political issues" despite being a Member of Parliament.

== Brazil ==
- Brazil's Foreign Ministry was described as an "opponent" with an "anti-American slant".
- Brazilian Defense Minister Nelson Jobim confirmed an earlier rumor that the President of Bolivia, Evo Morales, is suffering from a serious sinus tumor.

== Canada ==
- Stephen Harper, Prime Minister of Canada, was described as a "master political strategist", relying on an extremely small circle of advisers and his own instincts. Diplomats note that he has played the game of high-stakes, partisan politics well, although his reputation for decisiveness and shrewdness has been tarnished by a sometimes vindictive pettiness. Another cable refers to Harper's controlling ways within the Conservatives.
- Michael Ignatieff, former Leader of the Official Opposition, was described as an "urbane, articulate, bilingual and with an impressive Rolodex of contacts around the world – including in the new Obama administration". Another cable cites a conversation between the Liberal Party national director Rocco Rossi and American embassy officials that Ignatieff did not typically listen to advisers and seemed unable to absorb helpful critiques on his speech delivery.
- Laureen Harper, Spouse of the Prime Minister, was described by an embassy official as extroverted and friendly. The cables note that she was "personable, free-spirited and with considerable personal charm, a pro at working a room, and many observers believe her to be more at ease in front of cameras and strangers than her husband". The cables had also note that she is "widely credited for 'softening' her more reserved husband's political image".

== China ==
- Hu Jintao, General Secretary of the Chinese Communist Party, was described by Japanese Prime Minister Taro Aso as "confident and relaxed" during their meetings in April 2009. This is in contrast to Wen Jiabao, Premier of the People's Republic of China, who was "very tired and seemed under a lot of pressure", attributed to the 2008 financial crisis.
- Xi Jinping, a senior leader in the Communist Party and its presumed future CCP General Secretary (a presumption proved correct in 2012), is portrayed as an "extremely ambitious" person who is incorruptible and has chosen to survive by becoming "redder than reds". A source close to Xi has revealed that he is neither corrupt nor a fan of democracy. He appears uninterested in leisure pursuits preferred by many high-ranking officials. Women consider him boring, a trait he shares with his stern superior, Hu.

== Egypt ==
Hosni Mubarak, former President of Egypt, was described as "a tried and true realist, innately cautious and conservative, and has little time for idealistic goals".

== Eritrea ==
Isaias Afwerki, President of Eritrea, was described by the U.S. Ambassador to Eritrea as a cruel "unhinged dictator" whose regime was "one bullet away from implosion". "This man is a lunatic", described the Djiboutian foreign minister, Mahmoud Ali Youssouf. A defected bodyguard remarked that Isaias was a recluse who spent his days painting and tinkering with gadgets and carpentry work. He appeared to make decisions in isolation with no discussion with his advisers. It was difficult to tell how Isaias would react each day and his moods changed constantly.

== France ==
Nicolas Sarkozy, President of France, was described by U.S. diplomatic officials as "thin-skinned", "authoritarian" and an "emperor with no clothes".

== Germany ==
Angela Merkel, Chancellor of Germany, is called Angela "Teflon" Merkel. The diplomats stated that "when cornered, Merkel can be tenacious but is risk averse and rarely creative".

== Haiti ==
Cables from the U.S. Embassy in Port-au-Prince paint an exhaustive portrait of René Préval, President of Haiti. Préval is described as fearful of exile, passive, indifferent to his advisors, and at the same time prone to micro-management. There is "special intelligence" on his medical regimen and he is rumored to be drinking heavily. He is skeptical of a U.N.-commissioned report being touted by the international community as a development template for Haiti.

== Iceland ==
Ingibjörg Sólrún Gísladóttir, former Minister for Foreign Affairs, was described as "having strong opinions, being able to compromise easily, being close to Jonas Gahr Støre the Norwegian Minister of Foreign Affairs, and as often having her arms crossed at the beginning of meetings". This was reported by former U.S. Ambassador to Iceland, Carol van Voorst, in early April 2008 to the Department of State in preparation for an official meeting between Gísladóttir and former U.S. Secretary of State, Condoleezza Rice, April 10–12 that same year.

== Iraq ==
Nouri al-Maliki, Prime Minister of Iraq, was labeled a "liar" and "an Iranian agent" by King Abdullah of Saudi Arabia, "saying he would never support him".

== Israel ==
Benjamin Netanyahu is "elegant and charming", according to a cable apparently penned by an official at the U.S. embassy in Egypt, "but never keeps his promises".

== Italy ==
A report of the U.S. Embassy in Rome stated that Senate Defense Committee President Giampiero Cantoni said that Silvio Berlusconi, Prime Minister of Italy, "fainted three times in public in recent years and that his medical tests have come back a complete mess". After describing a "political environment dominated by conspiracy theories", the report concludes that "sex scandals, criminal investigations, family problems and financial concerns appear to be weighing heavily on Berlusconi's personal and political health, as well as on his decision-making ability".

== Kenya ==
Kalonzo Musyoka, the Kenyan Vice President, is described as a "self-interested opportunist" by the US Ambassador to Kenya, Michael Ranneberger. He has expressed concerns about the health of President Mwai Kibaki.

== Libya ==
Muammar Gaddafi, the former de facto leader of Libya, allegedly has a fear of flying over water and he no longer relies on his all-female bodyguard force, only taking one to the U.N. during 2010. Gene Cretz, U.S. Ambassador to Libya, noted that Gaddafi never travels without his "voluptuous blonde" Ukrainian nurse, with whom some claim he is romantically linked. When her visa was not approved in time for Gaddafi's trip to the U.N., he had her privately flown to him afterward. The nurse is identified as Halyna Kolotnytska.

== Malaysia ==
Najib Tun Razak, the Prime Minister of Malaysia, is believed to be in a predicament over allegations of his involvement in the murder of Mongolian Altantuya Shaaribuu.

== Netherlands ==
- In a diplomatic cable, dated 6 July 2009, Jan Peter Balkenende, Prime Minister of the Netherlands from 2002 to 2010, is described as a "cunning politician", although "at first, he was dismissed as a lightweight Harry Potter' look-alike, but he has consistently and skillfully delivered Cabinet support for U.S. policy objectives while balancing fragile parliamentary majorities". It is also said that his last cabinet was "held together more by fear of early elections than any unity of vision".
- In that same diplomatic cable, Geert Wilders, Member of the House of Representatives of the Netherlands, is called a "golden-pompadoured maverick", who is "no friend of the U.S.: he opposes Dutch military involvement in Afghanistan; he believes development assistance is money wasted; he opposes NATO missions outside 'allied' territory; he is against most EU initiatives; and, most troubling, he forments [sic] fear and hatred of immigrants." The cable also says that his "anti-Islam, nationalist Freedom Party remains a thorn in the coalition's side".

== New Zealand ==
John Key, Prime Minister of New Zealand from 2008 to 2016, was described by former American ambassador to New Zealand, Charles Swindells, as having a "personal pro-American outlook".

== North Korea ==
Kim Jong Il, leader of North Korea, was portrayed to diplomats by a source as a "'flabby old chap' and someone who had suffered 'physical and psychological trauma' as a result of his stroke". Chinese diplomats consider Kim irascible and unpredictable, mentioning they do not "like" North Korea, but "they are a neighbour". Kim has a reputation among Chinese diplomats as being "quite a good drinker". One Shanghai source says that he "has a long history of recreational drug use that has resulted in frequent bouts of epilepsy and contributed to his poor health overall".

== Philippines ==
- Gloria Macapagal Arroyo, former President of the Philippines, was praised by Hu Zhengyue, then-Director General for Asian Affairs of the Chinese Ministry of Foreign Affairs. Hu, however noted that poverty is the second-biggest problem in the Philippines and that China "cannot do much about that". He claimed that Arroyo "is in control".
- Chinese Assistant Foreign Minister Cui Tiankai noted that, "While there are persistent rumors about military coups in the Philippines, they rarely happen."
- Visiting US State Department official Eric John noted "the extremely successful approach to counterterrorism the GRP [Government of the Republic of the Philippines] has taken in Mindanao, with the support of the United States". John agreed with the Chinese officials that "President Arroyo has stabilized Philippine leadership and enacted strong fiscal and economic policy, but stressed that Beijing and Washington must encourage Manila to continue working hard to promote transparency and good governance."
- A leaked diplomatic cable also claimed that Arroyo's administration was corrupt, even worse than that of Ferdinand Marcos, and that Arroyo's husband, Jose Miguel Arroyo, is one of the most corrupt.

== Russia ==
- Vladimir Putin, Prime Minister of Russia, wields less power than his "alpha dog" image in the media portrays. He is alleged to bribe Kremlin figures, or else many of his edicts are not implemented. American diplomats have raised concerns over personal corruption, calling Putin's Russia a "mafia state". The Swiss oil-trading company Gunvor is "rumored to be one of Putin's sources of undisclosed wealth", allegedly "bringing its owners billions of dollars in profit". Diplomats have also discussed Putin's very close relationship with Italian Prime Minister Silvio Berlusconi, and "the pair enjoyed such a close relationship that they shared a 'direct line'". It is suspected that Berlusconi's personal relationship with Putin influenced the sale of part of Russian state-owned Gazprom's oil subsidiary Gazpromneft to Italian Eni. At the April 4, 2008, NATO–Russia Council Summit in Bucharest, Romania, Putin "implicitly challenged" the territorial integrity of Ukraine.
- Dmitry Medvedev, the Russian president, was described as "pale" and "indecisive", playing "Robin to Putin's Batman".

== Saudi Arabia ==
King Abdullah was stated by diplomats as "'tending to express himself tersely' because of his lifelong struggle with a 'speech impediment', but added that he is a 'wry and forthright interlocutor'".

== Sri Lanka ==
Chandrika Bandaranaike Kumaratunga, former president of Sri Lanka, was described as "highly volatile". Her track record had involved lashing out routinely at the prime minister Ranil Wickremasinghe and other targets of her displeasure during the period 2001–2004. She had a propensity for making huge issues of matters and then dropping them.

== Sweden ==
Carl Bildt, Swedish minister of foreign affairs, was described as a "Medium size dog with big dog attitude".

== Tunisia ==
Zine El Abidine Ben Ali, former Tunisian president, was described as "deserving credit for continuing the progressive policies of President Bourguiba", however "he and his regime have lost touch with the Tunisian people". It is said the Tunisian leader does not accept domestic or international criticism. US cables also described "high-level corruption, a sclerotic regime, and deep hatred of President Zine el Abidine Ben Ali's wife and her family".

== Turkey ==
Recep Tayyip Erdoğan, Turkish prime minister, was described as a "perfectionist workaholic who sincerely cares for the well-being of those around him". He was also described by U.S. diplomats as having "little understanding of politics beyond Ankara" and as surrounding himself with an "iron ring of sycophantic (but contemptuous) advisors". He is said to be "isolated", and that his MPs and Ministers feel "fearful of Erdogan's wrath". Diplomats state that "he relies on his charisma, instincts, and the filterings of advisors who pull conspiracy theories off the web or are lost in neo-Ottoman Islamist fantasies". Erdogan responded strongly to the claims, threatening a lawsuit. He rejects the allegations of having "eight secret accounts in Swiss banks", stating that the people responsible for the 'slander' will "be crushed under these claims, will be finished and will disappear".

== Ukraine ==
Viktor Yushchenko, President of Ukraine, was described as discredited among the population because of his weakness of leadership; continuous conflicts with Yulia Tymoshenko, Prime Minister of Ukraine; needless hostility regarding Ukraine's relations with Russia; and his NATO ambitions.

== United Kingdom ==
Then-Prime Minister Gordon Brown was evaluated by the cables as having an "abysmal track record" which caused him to go from political "disaster to disaster".

== Venezuela ==
The former diplomatic adviser to French president Nicolas Sarkozy, Jean-David Levitte, told US diplomats that Venezuelan President Hugo Chávez is "crazy" and said that even Brazil was unable to support him anymore. He claimed that Chávez is taking one of the richest countries in Latin America and turning it into another Zimbabwe.

== Yemen ==
President of Yemen Ali Abdullah Saleh was described as a bizarre and extremely poor negotiator, wearing a buttoned-down khaki during a counter-terrorism meeting with US National Security Advisor John O. Brennan, and was described as disdainful and dismissive throughout the meeting. While at times he was conciliatory and congenial in matters such as terrorism and security, he was seemingly uninterested in the fundamental socio-economic issues the country is facing. Despite Brennan being there on the issues of Guantanamo detainees, he summons him on "important intelligence matters" only to claim that he has evidence that pro-Saddam Baathists are reorganizing to overthrow the government in Iraq, much to Brennan's annoyance. He reportedly does not trust his own country and prefers to force the Saudis and Americans to do the dirty work for him, such as infrastructure development and dealing with Islamists, while he prefers to take out his anger against separatists and has claimed on occasion that he is keeping the lid on top of a country that is "worse than Somalia". It is also noted that Saleh is overwhelmed, exhausted by the war, and more and more intolerant of internal criticism.

== Zimbabwe ==
Robert Mugabe, President of Zimbabwe, was described as "the crazy old man."
