= Mahmassani =

Mahmassani (Arabic: محمصاني) is an Arabic surname particularly occurring in Lebanon. Notable people with the surname include:

- Hani Mahmassani (1956–2025), Lebanese-American engineer, transport scientist and member of Northwestern University faculty
- Sobhi Mahmassani (1909–1986), Lebanese legal scholar, lawyer, judge, and politician
- Yahya Mahmassani (born 1935), Lebanese diplomat
