= Sandra McCardell =

Canadian diplomat

Her Excellency Sandra McCardell

Canadian High Commissioner to the Republic of South Africa
- In office August 2015 – Ongoing
- Preceded by: Gaston Barban
- Succeeded by: N/A

Sandra McCardell is a Canadian diplomat. After being appointed on July 20, 2009, McCardell was Ambassador to Libya before the 2011 Libyan civil war. She closed the Canadian Embassy and evacuated in February 2011; she subsequently returned to Tripoli in September 2011 to re-establish diplomatic relations after the fall of Gaddafi and completed her assignment in the fall of 2011. In February 2012, it was reported that McCardell's spouse, Edis Zagorac, was hired by engineering firm SNC-Lavalin to work as part of a military-civilian engineering unit with billions in contracts with the Gadhafi regime, including a $270 million prison project. Following the discovery, Foreign Affairs Minister John Baird requested a review into the potential for conflicts of interest, to which nothing was found. In 2012, she was named Ambassador of Canada to Morocco and Mauritania. In 2015, she became High Commissioner of Canada in South Africa, Namibia, Lesotho and Mauritius and Ambassador to Madagascar.

== Career ==
McCardell began her diplomatic career working in Israel. She is also a former political advisor at the Office of the High Representative in Bosnia and Herzegovina.
