= London Conference on Libya =

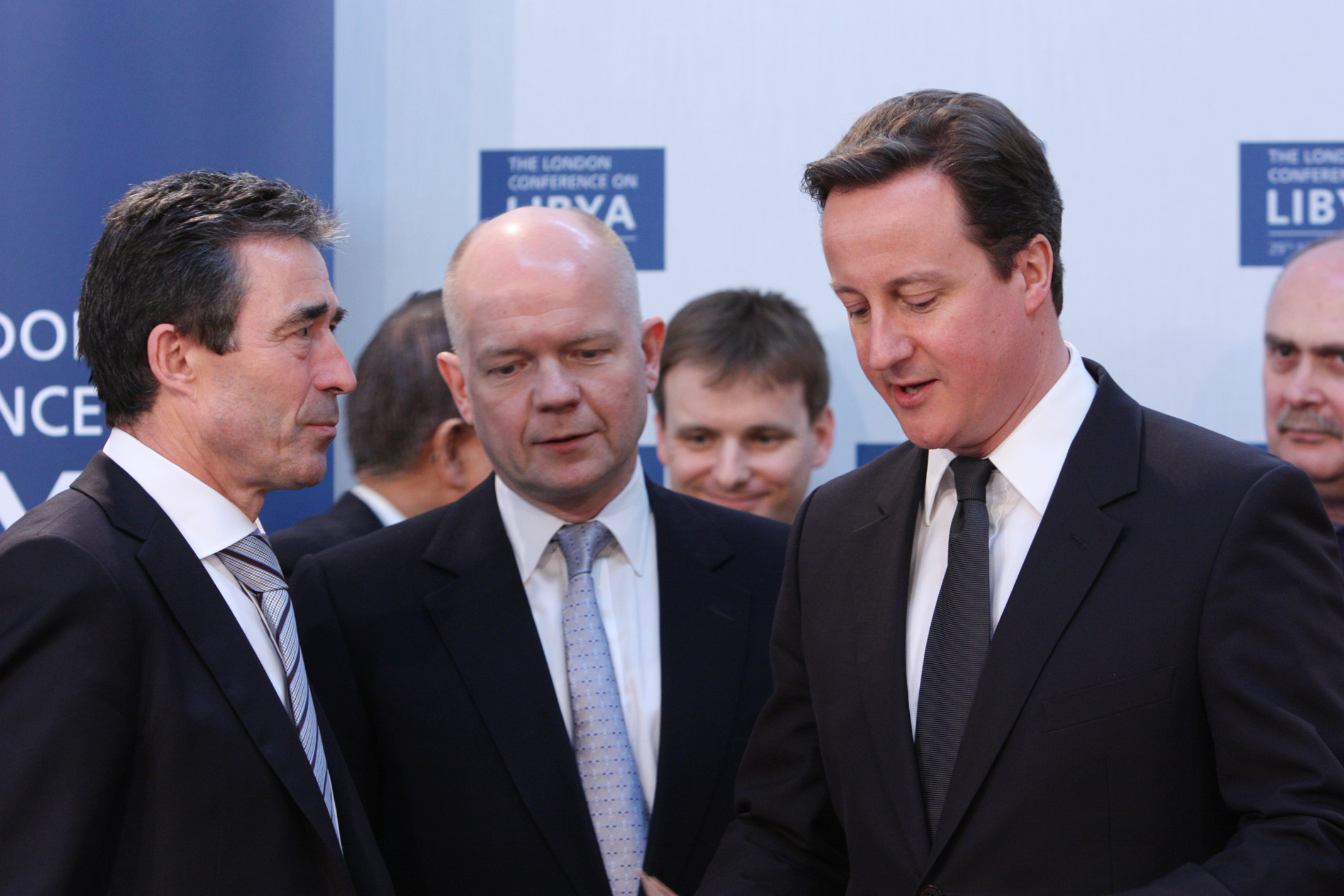
UK Prime Minister David Cameron and Foreign Secretary William Hague speaking to NATO Secretary General Anders Fogh Rasmussen at the London Conference

The London Conference on Libya was an international meeting of government representatives in London on 29 March 2011 to discuss intervention in the Libyan Civil War on behalf of the National Transitional Council. Attendees included foreign ministers and leaders from the United Nations, the League of Arab States, the Organisation of Islamic Cooperation, the European Union and NATO. The meeting was chaired by the British Foreign Secretary William Hague. While leaders of the Libyan opposition including Mahmoud Jibril were consulted prior to the conference, they did not attend.

The meeting resulted in the setting up of the Libya Contact Group, which served as an organizational basis for intervention in Libya until the overthrow of Muammar Gaddafi in August 2011.

== See also ==
- Libya Contact Group
- Libyan Civil War
