= Libya Contact Group =

The Libya Contact Group was an international collective established to support the Libyan National Transitional Council in their effort to overthrow the regime of Muammar Gaddafi in Libya. It was hosted by western nations and members of the Arab League, and known by a variety of other names including the Friends of Libya and the International Contact Group for Libya.

== Formation ==
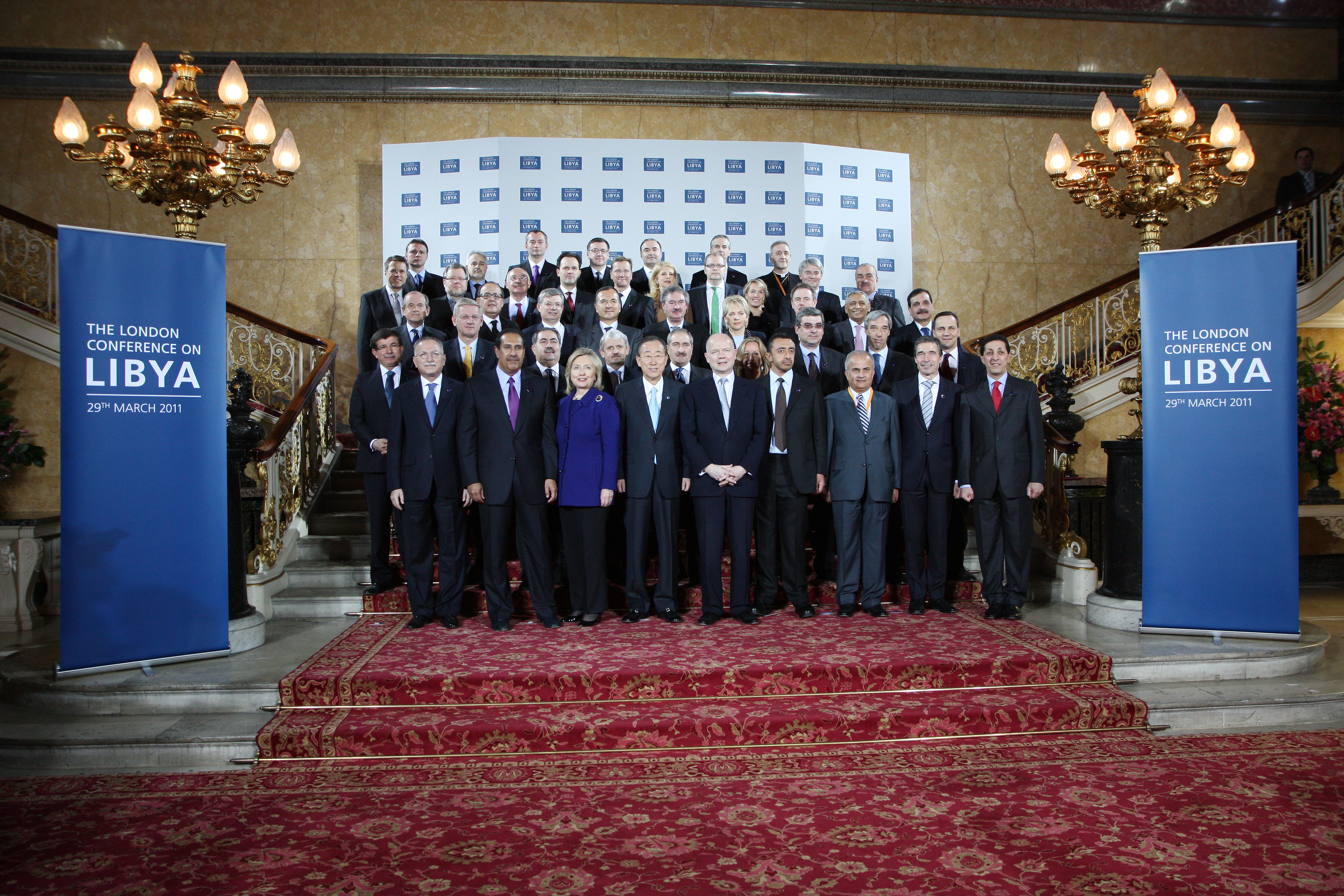
Attendees at the London Conference on Libya on 29 March 2011

The Contact Group was set up following the London Conference on Libya in March 2011. The conference included United Nations Secretary-General Ban Ki-moon, prominent delegates from the Arab League and from European countries, U.S. Secretary of State Hillary Clinton, and representatives from NATO. Leaders of the Libyan National Transitional Council including Mahmoud Jibril were consulted prior to the conference but did not attend.

== Contact Group ==
Its first three meetings were in Doha, Rome and Abu Dhabi.

In its fourth meeting, held in Istanbul in July 2011 and attended by American Secretary of State Hillary Clinton, the Contact Group announced its participants' agreement to deal with the Libyan National Transitional Council, the major coalition of anti-Gaddafi forces, as the "legitimate governing authority in Libya".

The fifth meeting was planned to take place in New York on September, but the events in Tripoli forced the members to meet again in Istanbul on extraordinary meeting on 25 August to set up road map for construction of "new Libya".

The group recognized the progress made by the Libyan people, NTC, and NATO forces, and underlined the importance of continued support from all entities in the formation of a free and democratic Libya.

== Friends of Libya ==
At the meeting on 1 September 2011 in Paris, the Contact Group was dissolved and replaced with a new international meeting group called the Friends of Libya.

A second Friends of Libya conference was held on September 20, 2011 in New York City.

== Members ==
=== Countries ===
- Australia
- Bahrain
- Belgium
- Bulgaria
- Canada
- Denmark
- France
- Germany
- Greece
- Italy
- Japan
- Jordan
- Kuwait
- Lebanon
- Libya (NTC)
- Luxembourg
- Malta
- Morocco
- Netherlands
- Norway
- Poland
- Spain
- Sweden
- Turkey
- United Arab Emirates
- United Kingdom
- United States

Belgium, Luxembourg, and Netherlands shared a rotating Benelux seat. Denmark, Norway, and Sweden had a similar arrangement, sharing a Nordic seat.

==== Observers ====
- Algeria
- Brazil
- Cyprus
- Egypt
- Ethiopia
- Holy See (Vatican City)
- India
- People's Republic of China
- Portugal
- Romania
- Senegal
- South Africa
- South Korea
- Sudan
- Tunisia
- Ukraine

Bulgaria was originally an observer, but it began sitting as a full member at the June meeting in Abu Dhabi and thereafter. South Africa boycotted the September meeting in Paris.

=== International organisations ===
- Arab League
- European Union
- Gulf Cooperation Council
- NATO
- Organisation of Islamic Cooperation
- United Nations

==== Observers ====
- African Union
- World Bank

Arab League, Gulf Cooperation Council and Organisation of Islamic Cooperation were originally observers, but they began sitting as a full members probably from 29 of July.

=== Last meeting in Paris ===
President of France Nicolas Sarkozy invited several new countries and one international organisation on the last meeting of Libya Contact Group:

- Bosnia and Herzegovina
- Chad
- Colombia
- Gabon
- Iraq
- Mali
- Mauritania
- Niger
- Nigeria
- Russia
- Saudi Arabia
- Switzerland
- Union for the Mediterranean

Nigeria and Saudi Arabia reportedly did attend.

== See also ==
- Friends of Syria Group
