= Yahya Mahmassani =

Lebanese diplomat (born 1935)

Ambassador of Lebanon to Austria

Ambassador of Lebanon to Italy
- In office 1992–1996

Ambassador of Lebanon to Yugoslavia
- In office 1982–?

Personal details
- Born: Yahya Ahmed Mahmassani; 1935 (age 90–91) Beirut, Lebanon
- Children: 3
- Education: American University of Beirut

Yahya Mahmassani (born 1935) is a Lebanese diplomat. In addition to his posts at the United Nations (UN) he served as the ambassador of Lebanon in Yugoslavia, Italy and Austria.

== Early life and education ==
Mahmassani was born in Beirut in 1935. His father, Ahmed, was a landlord.

Mahmassani graduated from the American University of Beirut. He also received a master's degree in economics.

== Career ==
Mahmassani is a diplomat by profession and started his career as a first secretary of the Lebanese Embassy at the UN in 1969. The same year he was made the deputy permanent representative of Lebanon to the UN. He was elected as the chair of the United Nations General Assembly's 3rd Committee. He was appointed ambassador of Lebanon to Yugoslavia in 1982. He was the ambassador of Lebanon to Italy between 1992 and 1996 and during the same period he was also the permanent representative of Lebanon to the Food and Agriculture Organization. He also served as the ambassador of Lebanon to Austria.

Mahmassani was the permanent observer of the Arab League at the UN until 2011.

== Personal life ==
Mahmassani married Hoda Abu Zahr in Beirut in 1975. They have three children, two sons and one daughter.
