= Halyna Kolotnytska =

Libyan-Ukrainian nurse

Halyna Kolotnytska (Ukrainian: Галина Колотницька, née Galyna Koschiy, also spelled Galina Kolotnitskaya after the Russian form of her name (Russian: Галина Колотницкая); b.2 January 1976) is a Libyan-Ukrainian nurse and a former member of her country's Antarctic research mission. She is mostly known for her close association with former Libyan leader Muammar Gaddafi.

== Early life ==
Kolotnytska was born on 2 January 1976 in Brovary, in the Ukrainian SSR of the Soviet Union (in present-day Ukraine). She graduated from an unspecified nursing college in Kyiv. Kolotnytska's husband, an electrician at a local factory, died in 1992, after which Kolotnytska moved from her local nursing job to work as a cook at Ukraine's Antarctic research station. There she was described as "harshly enforcing hygiene rules".

== Career ==
Kolotnytska moved to Libya in 2001, with the help of a medical agency acquired abroad, where she first worked at a hospital and then went on to serve Gaddafi. At the time, Libya was a popular destination for Ukrainian doctors because the pay was higher than in Ukraine. According to various estimates, there were about 500 Ukrainian doctors and nurses in Libya in early 2011. It is reported that Gaddafi employed four nurses from Ukraine.

Kolotnytska left Libya in the midst of the Libyan Civil War; evacuated by the Ukrainian ministry of defence she arrived in Kyiv (the capital of Ukraine) on 27 February 2011.

Kolotnytska applied for political asylum in Norway early May 2011. Norwegian authorities swiftly refused to grant asylum to her.

== United States diplomatic cables leak ==
Kolotnytska was described by Gene Cretz, the U.S. ambassador to Libya, as the "voluptuous blonde" without whom Muammar Gaddafi, leader of Libya, never traveled. The characterization surfaced after the secret diplomatic cable sent by Cretz was published as a part of the United States diplomatic cables leak. The cable was sent from the United States embassy in Tripoli on 29 September 2009. It was also revealed that the Libyan government sent a private jet to ferry her from Libya to Portugal, to meet Gaddafi during his rest-stop. Kolotnytska alone is said to have "known Gaddafi's routine". Kolotnytska's daughter Tatyana and her mother Iryna have denied that Kolotnytska was Gaddafi's mistress.
