= Al Khuimat =

Al Khuimat الخويمات
- Village
- Country: Libya
- Region: Cyrenaica
- District: Jabal al Akhdar
- Time zone: UTC+2

Al Khuimat (Arabic: الخويمات) is a village in the Jabal al Akhdar district of eastern Libya. Al Khuimat is located about 125 km southwest of Bayda.

== See also ==
- List of cities in Libya
