= Sayyid Abdulwaḥd =

Sayyid Abdulwaḥd سيدي عبد الواحد
- Village
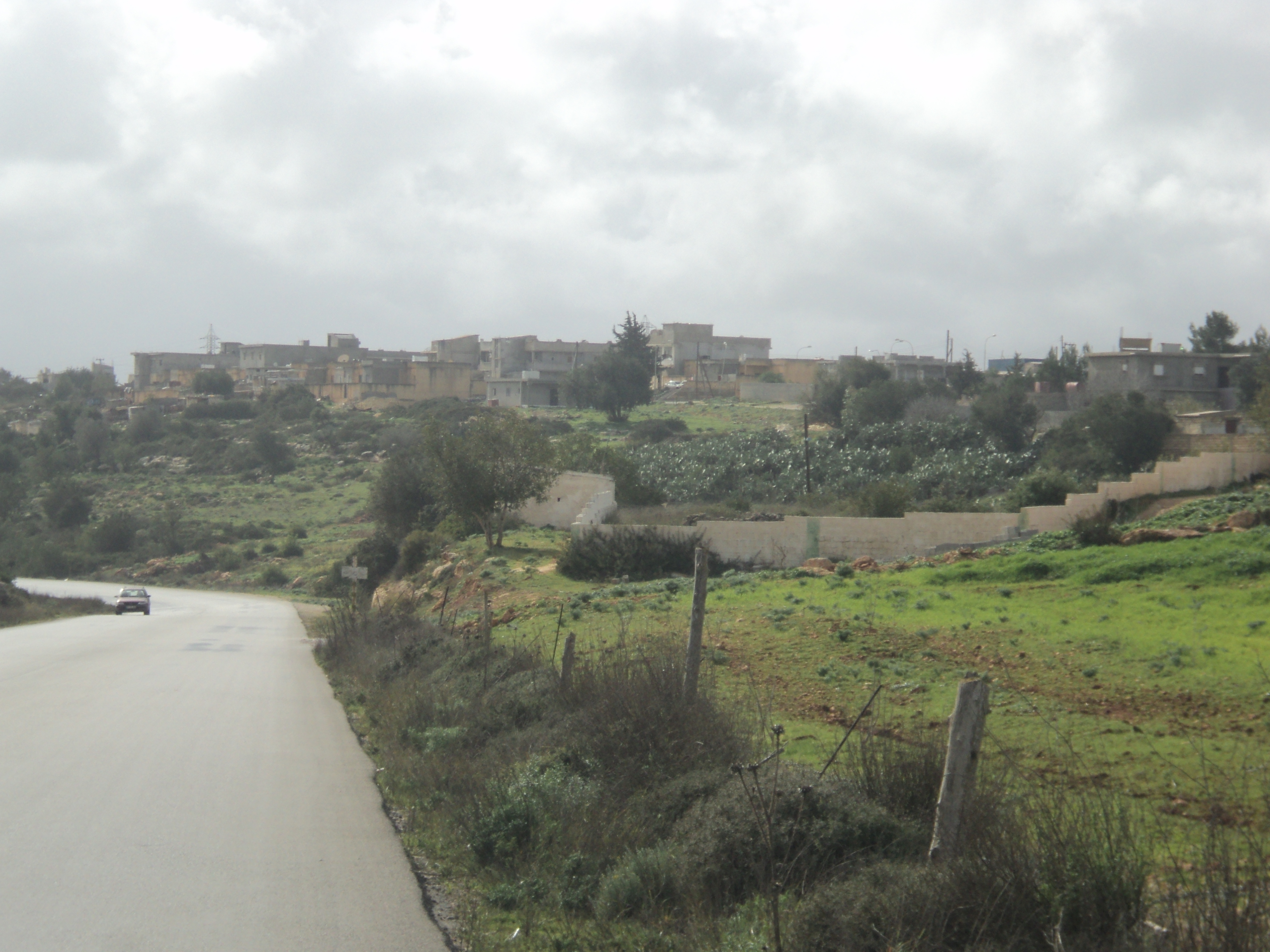

- Location in Libya
- Coordinates: 32°43′27.18″N 21°34′47.94″E
- Country: Libya
- Region: Cyrenaica
- District: Jabal al Akhdar
- Time zone: UTC+2

Sayyid Abdulwaḥd (Arabic: سيدي عبد الواحد) is a village in the District of Jabal al Akhdar in north-eastern Libya. It's located 17 km west of Bayda.
