= Bil Hadid =

Bil Ḥadid بالحديد
- Village
- Location in Libya
- Coordinates: 32°41′26.31″N 21°30′35.08″E
- Country: Libya
- Region: Cyrenaica
- District: Jabal al Akhdar
- Time zone: UTC + 2

Bil Ḥadid (Arabic: بالحديد) is a village in the District of Jabal al Akhdar in north-eastern Libya, 28 kilometres (17 mi) west of Bayda.
