= Aqfanta =

Aqfanta أقفنطة
- Village
- Location in Libya
- Coordinates: 32°45′7.51″N 21°34′44.27″E
- Country: Libya
- Region: Cyrenaica
- District: Jabal al Akhdar
- Time zone: UTC+2

Aqfanta (Arabic: أقفنطة) is a village in the District of Jabal al Akhdar in north-eastern Libya. It's located 17 km northwest of Bayda.
