= Kaf Miyas =

Kaf Miyas كهف مياز
- Village
- Location in Libya
- Coordinates: 32°43′20″N 21°42′10″E
- Country: Libya
- Region: Cyrenaica
- District: Jabal al Akhdar
- Time zone: UTC+2

Kaf Miyas (Arabic: كهف مياز) is a suburb of Bayda. It is located about 2 km south of Bayda.
