= Ahqaf al Jabbarat =

Ahqaf al Jabbarat احقاف الجبرات
- Village
- Location in Libya
- Coordinates: 32°41′14″N 21°54′37″E
- Country: Libya
- Region: Cyrenaica
- District: Jebel el-Akhdar
- Time zone: UTC + 2

Ahqaf al Jabbarat (Arabic: احقاف الجبرات) is a village in the District of Jebel el-Akhdar in north-eastern Cyrenaica, Libya. Ahqaf al Jabbarat is located about 21 km southwest of the city of Beida.
