= Ahqaf al Ruzat =

Ahqaf al Ruzat احقاف الروزات
- Village
- Location in Libya
- Coordinates: 32°49′54″N 21°54′16″E
- Country: Libya
- Region: Cyrenaica
- District: Jebel el-Akhdar
- Time zone: UTC + 2

Ahqaf al Ruzat (Arabic: احقاف الروزات) is a village in the District of Jebel el-Akhdar in north-eastern Libya. Ahqaf al Ruzat is located about 23 km northeast of the city of Beida.
