= Ahqaf al Jabhiya =

Village in Cyrenaica, Libya

Ahqaf al Jabhiya الجبيهيه
- Village
- Location in Libya
- Coordinates: 32°43′27″N 21°43′17″E
- Country: Libya
- Region: Cyrenaica
- District: Jabal al Akhdar
- Time zone: UTC+2

Ahqaf al Jabhiya (Arabic: الجبيهيه) is a city in Libya. It is a suburb located about 3.5km south of Bayda, Libya.
