= Zawiyat al ʽUrqub =

Zawiyat al ʽUrqub زاوية العرقوب
- Town
- Location in Libya
- Coordinates: 32°50′N 21°36′E
- Country: Libya
- Region: Cyrenaica
- District: Jabal al Akhdar
- Time zone: UTC+2

Zawiyat al ʽUrqub (Arabic: زاوية العرقوب) is a town in the District of Jabal al Akhdar in north-eastern Libya. It is located 30 km west of Bayda

== Photo gallery ==
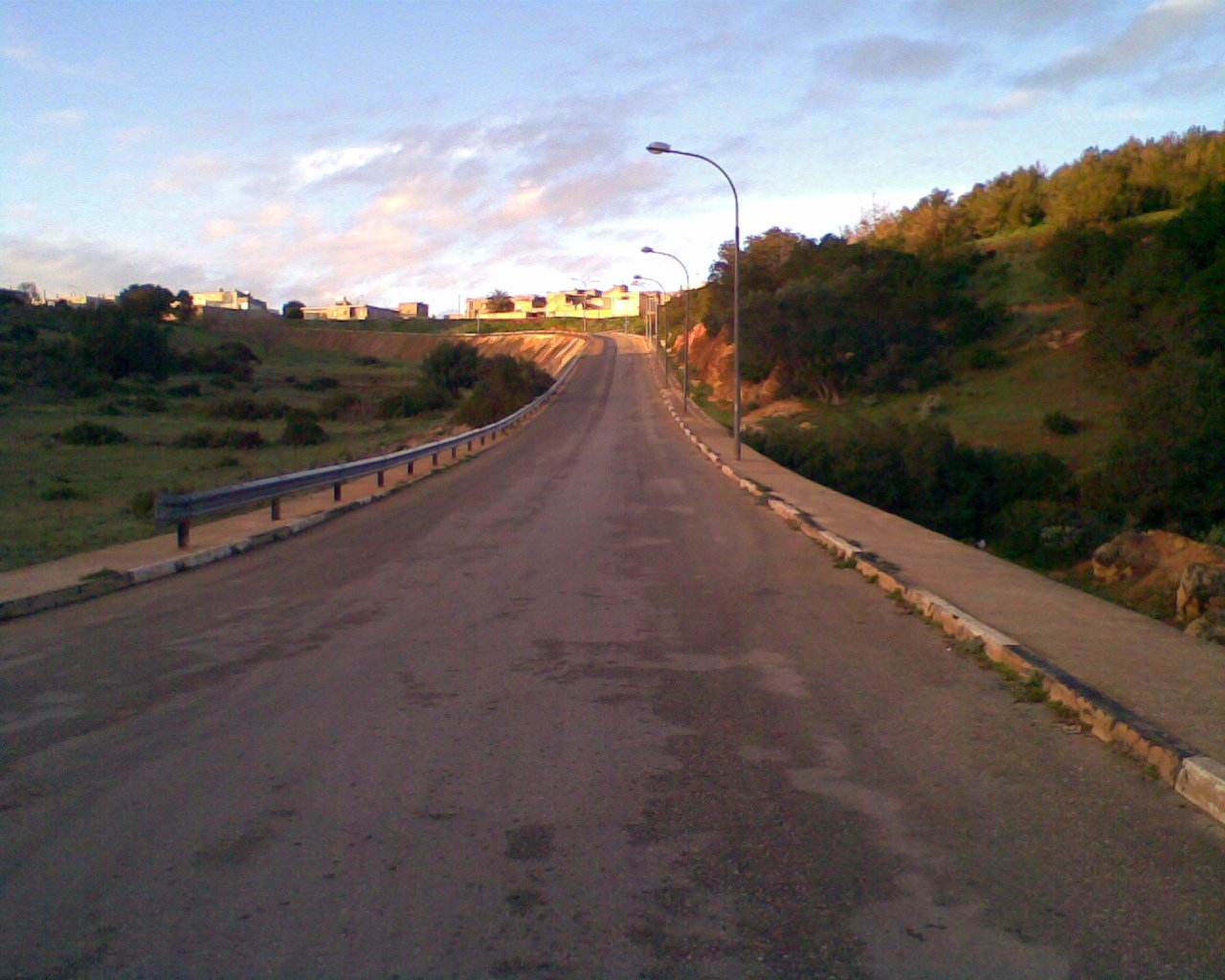
Zawiyat al ‘Urqub's eastern gateway

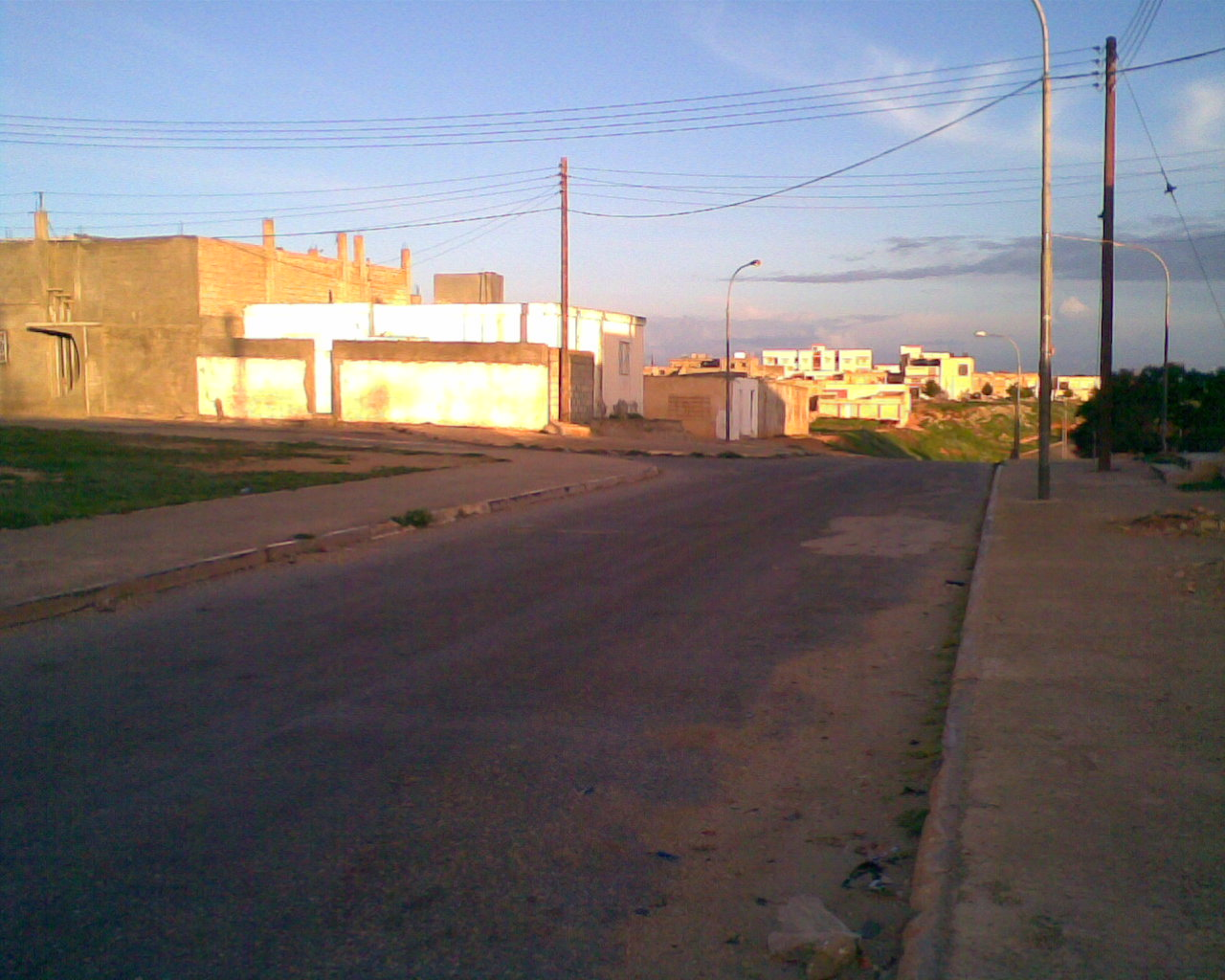
A view inside the village
