= Kuhuf Tuhudiya =

- Village
- Location in Libya
- Coordinates: 32°42′20″N 21°52′43″E
- Country: Libya
- Region: Cyrenaica
- District: Jabal al Akhdar
- Time zone: UTC + 2

Kuhuf Tuhudiya is a village in the District of Jabal al Akhdar in north-eastern Libya. It is located about 13 km southeast of Bayda.
