= Battle of Bayda =

First battle of the First Libyan Civil War

Coordinates: 32°45′59″N 21°44′30″E

- Part of Libyan Civil War (2011)
Date	16–17 February 2011
Location	Bayda, Libya
Result	Anti-Gaddafi victory

Belligerents
(Libya) Anti-Gaddafi forces	(Libya) Libyan Arab Jamahiriya

Strength
Unknown	400 mercenaries

Casualties and losses
150 killed	50 killed

The Battle of Bayda was the first conflict that broke out during the First Libyan Civil War between the brigades of Colonel Muammar Gaddafi and the Libyan rebels in the 4th-largest city in the country, the city of Bayda and its suburbs. The battle took place as a result of the demonstrations calling for the fall of the regime in Bayda, and after that the demonstrators clashed with the personnel of the internal security agency in the city and the Talaa Khamis Brigade and the mercenaries and the Hussein Al-Jouifi Brigade stationed in Shahhat and Al Abraq International Airport in Bayda. The fighting continued one day in Bayda and the city was liberated, and then the Libyan revolutionaries headed to the outskirts of the city in Shahhat and Al-Abraq Airport. The revolutionaries were able to control the city and its suburbs, and thus Bayda was the first city to break out of Gaddafi's control and remained under the rebels' control throughout the revolution.

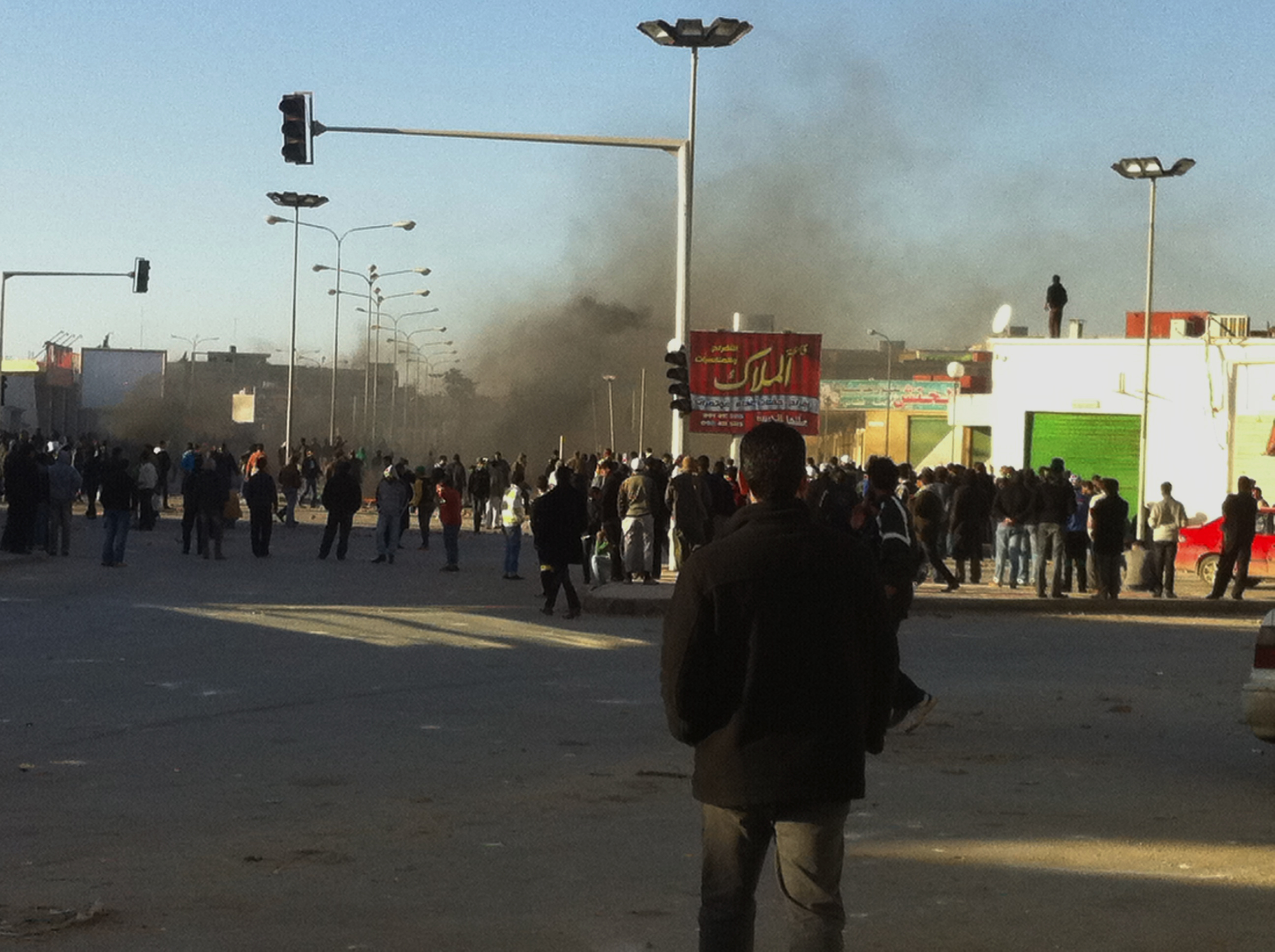
Confrontations between the rebels and the Libyan Army in Bayda.

== Background ==
The first spark of a peaceful popular revolution erupted in Libya for the first time to demand the overthrow of the regime at the Al-Talhi junction, which is now known as Al-Sharara Junction, in Bayda city on 16 February, similar to the Arab revolutions that existed at the time, and then the demonstrators headed to the city center and there was a match that day between the Al-Akhdar Al-Libi Club and the Sudanese Al-Merrikh Club; after the match, the crowd rallied with the demonstrators, and the demonstration became huge so the Internal Security and the Revolutionary Committees' Hussein al-Jouifi Brigade and the Khamis Brigade, located in al-Bayda and Shahat, suppressed the demonstrations, and massacres were committed in Bayda, where live ammunition was sprayed. At the demonstrations on Al Oroba Street and the Hospital Street and city squares, the situation got out of hand in Bayda and pushed the Libyan citizens to attack the Internal Security Agency, Al-Abraq Airport, the Hussein Al-Jouifi Brigade, and the remnants of the mercenaries. On 18 February, the rebels managed to seize the battalion, the airport and some of the planes that landed in it, and destroy the airport runways. Civilians in Bayda seized the weapons they found at the battalion headquarters. Later, on 21 February of the same year, Gaddafi's brigades attacked the airport to try to recapture it from the rebels, but they succeeded in shooting down the first helicopter in the conflict between the rebels and the Gaddafi brigades, and they formed popular committees to protect it. After the liberation of Bayda, other Libyan cities were liberated from the grip of Gaddafi, and Derna, Zintan, Tobruk and Al-Marj were liberated. And Ajdabiya, Benghazi, Zawiya, Zuwara, Misrata and others, until the entire eastern half of Libya, was within a few days, outside Gaddafi's control.

== Importance of Bayda ==
Bayda is the fourth largest city in the country and the second largest city in the eastern region after Benghazi and the largest city in Jabal al Akhdar, where there is a military airport, in addition to the Hussein Al-Jouifi Brigade located in Shahhat, and in the south of the city there are major weapons stores, "Al-Mashlal stores." It also includes many departments such as the Main Department of the National Commercial Bank and others.

== Battle ==
The Internal Security Agency and the Khamis and Hussein Brigade, or known as Gaddafi's Al-Jarih Al-Jouifi Brigade, opened fire on the demonstrators in the city. There, the first three people of the Libyan revolution were killed on Wednesday, 16 February, and the first of them was “Saad Hamad Al-Yamani,” who was 21 years old. The Director of Security of the Jebel al-Akhdar area Brigadier Hassan Al - Qaradawi was sacked from his post Thursday morning and replaced with Colonel Faraj Barasi. Thursday, 17 February was the first appearance of mercenaries in Libya in Casablanca on Al-Orouba Street. The followers of Gaddafi numbered about 400 mercenaries. After that, the situation worsened in the city and massacres took place and the local security (Relief, Central Support) joined the demonstrators. They attacked civilians at the Security Directorate and a training headquarters for the army and the civilians obtained weapons to defend themselves and on the evening of 17 February, the city of Bayda became liberated, and after that the revolutionaries headed with weapons to the Hussein Al-Juwaihi Bashhat Brigade, where the mercenaries were stationed, liberating the battalion and the military and civilian airport.

The palace of Colonel Muammar Gaddafi and Abdullah Al-Senussi and the family of Safia Farkash, Muammar Gaddafi's wife, who was in the city of Al-Bayda, were also stormed and completely destroyed by the rebels. They found books on magic and Talmud and secret trenches with a nuclear bomb shelter in the house. The battle ended with the victory of the revolutionaries over Gaddafi's forces, and thus the city of Bayda became the first city under the control of the revolutionaries and remained under their control throughout the revolution. The number of missing people in the city reached fifty or more people, and it was reported that the number of dead reached 150 of the revolutionaries and 50 of the Gaddafi Brigades. 18 civilians and 63 soldiers were killed in the battle.

== See also ==
- Libyan civil war (2011)
- First Battle of Benghazi
