= List of universities in Libya =

This is a list of accredited public and private non-profit universities according to the data of the Ministry of Higher Education and Scientific Research and the National Center for Quality Assurance and Accreditation of Educational and Training Institutions in the State of Libya.

== Accredited And Recognized Public Universities ==
- Academy of Graduate Studies
- Al-Mergib University
- University of Al-Jabal Al Gharbi
- Al Zawiya University
- Azzaytuna University
- Misrata University
- Sabratha University
- Omar Al-Mukhtar University
- The Islamic University of Asaied Mohamed Bin Ali Al Sanussi
- Open University of Libya
- Sabha University
- University of Benghazi
- College of Electrical and Electronics Technology (CEET), Benghazi
- University of Tripoli
- University of Derna
- University of Sirte
- University of Aljufra
- University of Fezzan
- University of Tobruk
- University of Bani Walid
- University of Aljafara
- University of Nalut
- University of Al-Zintan
- University of Bright Star
- University of Ajdabiya
- Asmarya University for the Islamic Sciences
- Al-Arab Medical University
- Gulf of Sidra University
- Wadi Alshatti University

== Accredited Private Not-For-Profit Universities ==
- Al Rifaq University for Humanitarian and Applied Science - Tripoli City
- Libyan University for Humanitarian and Applied Science - Tajora City
- Africa University for Humanitarian and Applied Science - Tripoli City
- Attahadi Medical Al-Ahlia University (Attahadi University) - Tripoli City
- Faculty of Dentistry Khalij Libya - Janzour City
- Al-Hadera University for Humanities and Applied Sciences - Tripoli City
- Al-Mawakeb International College for Humanities and Applied Sciences - Tripoli City
- University of Tripoli Al-Ahlia - Janzour City
- Libyan International University - Benghazi City
- Benghazi Al-Ahlia University - Benghazi City
- Balagrae university- Benghazi City
- Berenice University of Architecture and Urbanism - Benghazi City
- Al-Furat Al-Ahlia University - Ajdabiya City
- Mediterranean University - Benghazi City
- Benghazi Modern University - Benghazi City
- University of Al-Awael - Ajdabiya City
- University of Al-Awael - Tobruk City Branch
- British Libyan University - Benghazi City
- Assalam International University - Benghazi City
- Modern American University - Benghazi City
- Al-Assema Private University - Tripoli City
