= Misurata University =

University in Misrata, Libya

- Type: Public university
- Established: 1984; 42 years ago
- President: Dr. Muhammed Al-Danfour
- Location: Misurata, 2478, Libya; 32.372936°N 15.078410°E
- Website: https://www.misuratau.edu.ly/en/

Misurata University is a state university in Libya, located in Libya's third largest city 'Misurata'. The university provides nationally and internationally recognized educational services that equip the members of the academic community with competencies and values that will better serve the nation. The university has 19 different faculties around the city and it offers more than 150 undergraduate courses. It endeavors to provide higher education and training quality to its students and staff and prepare them to take part in modernizing and developing the national society and economy. Misurata University also aims to promote, by research and other means, the advancement of knowledge and to apply suggestions and recommendations to economic, social, cultural, and technological problems.

== History ==
Misurata university was originally established in 1984.

In 2010, it was named Misurata university after merging the University of the Seventh of October with the University of Al-Merqib, based on the decision of the General People's Committee No. (149) for the year 2010 AD for restructuring Libyan universities.

== Faculties ==
Misurata University has 19 faculties offering more than 100 areas of study.

- Faculty of Science
- Faculty of Engineering
- Faculty of Education
- College of Economics and Political Science
- Faculty of Information Technology
- Faculty of Agriculture
- Faculty of Arts
- Faculty of Law
- Faculty of Arts and Media
- Faculty of Medicine
- Faculty of Languages and Translation
- Faculty of Islamic Studies
- Faculty of Physical Education and Sports Sciences
- Faculty of Dentistry
- Faculty of Nursing
- Faculty of Pharmacy
- Faculty of Environmental and Natural Resources
- Faculty of Veterinary Medicine
- Faculty of Humanities and Applied Sciences- Taurga

== See also ==
- Education in Libya
- List of universities in Libya
