= Iman al-Obeidi =

Libyan law student

- Eman
- Pronunciation: إيمان
- Born: Iman; Circa 1982; Tobruk, Libya
- Citizenship: Libya
- Education: Omar Al-Mukhtar University
- Alma mater: Omar Al-Mukhtar University, Bayda
- Family: Amal

Iman al-Obeidi (also spelled Eman al-Obeidy; Arabic: إيمان العبيدي pronounced [ʔiːˈmæːn əlʕʊˈbeːdi]; born circa 1982) is a former Libyan postgraduate law student who received worldwide media attention during the Libyan Civil War. This was because she burst into the restaurant of the Rixos Hotel in Tripoli and told the international press corps there that Libyan troops had beaten and gang-raped her. Her public statement challenged both the Gaddafi government and the taboo against discussing sex crimes in Libya.

Government security forces dragged her out of the hotel to an unknown destination, and attacked journalists who tried to help her. Government representatives claimed she was drunk, mentally ill, a prostitute, and a thief, and said she would be charged with slander. The Washington Post described her as a "symbol of defiance against Gaddafi."

She was released from government detention after three days, and was interviewed several times by Libya TV—an opposition satellite channel—and by CNN, during which she offered graphic details of her rape and subsequent detention by government officials. She fled Libya with a defecting military officer, who helped her cross into Tunisia, dressed in a Berber tribal costume to hide her identity. She was initially offered protection by European diplomats in Qatar and applied for refugee status there. After initially protecting her, in early June 2011 Qatar forcibly deported her back to Libya. On June 4, 2011, she was granted asylum in the United States with the help of Hillary Clinton.

Al-Obeidi settled in Colorado under the name Eman Ali. She was later charged with a number of violent offenses, including a February 2014 assault on two patrons at a downtown bar in Boulder, Colorado for which she was convicted in May 2015 of a Class 4 felony.

== Background ==
Iman al-Obeidi was one of ten children born in Tobruk to Aisha and Atik al-Obeidi. Her father was a customs agent. Her mother told CNN that Iman had always wanted to be a journalist, but due to the lack of press freedom in Libya, Iman decided to study law instead. She graduated in law from the Omar Al-Mukhtar University in Bayda, and had been living in Tripoli for the past year with her sister, Amal, either interning at a law firm or working in a tourism office, while pursuing postgraduate studies.

== March 2011 controversy ==
=== Appearance at the Rixos Al Nasr hotel ===
Al-Obeidi entered the Rixos Al Nasr hotel on March 26, 2011, later telling CNN she had gained entry by pretending to be a member of staff. After finding foreign journalists in the restaurant, she showed them her injuries, which The New York Times described as "a broad bruise on her face, a large scar on her upper thigh, several narrow and deep scratch marks lower on her leg, and marks that seemed to come from binding around her hands and feet."

She told the journalists she had been stopped two days earlier at a checkpoint on Salahiddeen Road in Tripoli, while in a car with her sister's husband, later reported as Salih Hamid al-Aguri. When the security personnel heard her eastern Libyan accent, she was ordered to produce her identity card, and when they learned she was from Tobruk—where rebel forces were active—they detained her. She named the leader of the group who took her as Mansour Ibrahim Ali. She was held for two days, during which she said she was tied up, urinated and defecated upon, and raped by 15 men, some of them videotaping the attack. She said local residents near the place she was held had helped her escape.

There was a scuffle in the hotel as government officials and hotel staff tried to silence her. Several journalists were kicked, punched, and knocked over as they tried to help or speak to her. Security forces punched Jonathan Miller of Channel 4 News in the face for coming to her defense, pushed Charles Clover of the Financial Times to the ground and kicked him, smashed a CNN camera, and pointed a gun at a television crew.

Clover was later deported; before the incident, he had been told there were "inaccuracies in his reports." A member of the hotel's staff told Miller that the people involved in the violence, who were wearing hotel uniforms, did not in fact work for the hotel. Her attackers accused al-Obeidi of being a "traitor to Gaddafi"; two women grabbed table knives to threaten both her and the journalists, one then throwing a blanket over al-Obeidi's head in an attempt to muffle her. She had specifically asked to speak to Reuters and The New York Times; Michael Georgy of Reuters was able to talk to her briefly before she was taken away. She was finally subdued, dragged out of the hotel, and driven in an unmarked car to an unknown location.

=== Gaddafi government response ===
There was confusion for several days as to whether she was in government custody or with her family. At a press conference on March 26, government spokesman Moussa Ibrahim said investigators had found al-Obeidi was drunk and possibly mentally ill, a suggestion that raised fears she would face indefinite incarceration in a government-controlled mental institution, continuing the list of forced disappearances the opposition charges the Gaddafi regime with.

After journalists demanded to see her, Libyan Deputy Foreign Minister Khaled Kaim told CNN that five men, including the son of a high-ranking Libyan police officer, had been arrested in connection with the alleged rape. Kaim said al-Obeidi was being held at the headquarters of Libyan National Intelligence, was doing well, and would be provided with legal aid. Ibrahim withdrew the allegation that she was mentally ill, but then suggested she was a thief and a prostitute (Arabic: sharmuta) who had been on a prearranged meeting with one of the alleged rapists. This was rejected by al-Obeidi's 21-year-old sister Mawra: "We come from a good family. We study at university. Is this the type of people who engage in such horrible acts?"

Ibrahim expressed frustration about the international furore over al-Obeidi while Libya was suffering daily air-raids and massive civilian casualties. On March 27 he said al-Obeidi had been released and was with her sister. On March 28 her parents denied this, saying she was being held at Gaddafi's compound in Bab al-Azizia. According to one rebel activist, Gaddafi government representatives telephoned her mother at three o'clock in the morning on March 27, offering al-Obeidi "a new house and a lot of money and anything she wanted" if she would change her story. Her mother is reported to have spoken to al-Obeidi by telephone, and she replied, "I will die rather than change my words."

On March 29 Ibrahim told reporters that the men al-Obeidi accused of rape were making a case against her, and that she was facing criminal charges: "The boys she accused are bringing a case against her because it's a very grave offense to accuse someone of a sexual crime." He said al-Obeidi's criminal case against her alleged rapists had been dropped because she refused to undergo a medical examination. On April 3 Gaddafi supporters posted on the Web what they said was a pornographic video made by al-Obeidi. A state media reporter gave a copy to The New York Times, which described it as a homemade video of a belly dancer, relatively chaste according to the newspaper, and bearing little resemblance to al-Obeidi.

== Release from detention, interviews ==
=== April 3: Telephone interview with Libya TV ===
Al-Obeidi was first heard from again in public on April 3, when she talked by telephone to Libya TV, a new opposition satellite channel. During an emotional interview, she told them she had been in government detention for three days, but had been released and was in Tripoli; she said the Attorney-General had refused a request for her to visit her family in Tobruk. She said that during her detention she had been interrogated by Libyan intelligence—the Jamahiriya el-Mukhabarat—as well as the Criminal Investigation Department, and the Directorate of Security. Their "only request," she said, was that she "come out on the Libyan state channel and say that those who kidnapped [her] were not from Gaddafi's security forces, rather they were from the revolutionaries and armed gangs." She refused. She said a medical examiner confirmed her rape claim and the Attorney-General's office said it would "take all necessary measures to arrest those who were responsible."

=== April 3–5: Telephone interviews with CNN ===
She spoke to CNN by telephone several times between April 3 and 5, interviewed via an interpreter by Anderson Cooper, and on April 6 Gaddafi's son, Saadi, arranged for CNN reporter Nic Robertson to interview her on camera.

During the first telephone interview, she offered graphic details of her ordeal at the hands of 15 members of Libya's security forces. She said they poured alcohol into her eyes so she could not see them; raped her; sodomized her with a Kalashnikov; tied her up; bit her; and would not allow her to use the bathroom, eat, or drink. "One man would leave and another would enter," she said. "He would finish and then another man would come in." She said they told her: "Let the men from Eastern Libya come and see what we are doing to their women and how we treat them, how we rape them." There were other women held with her, including a 16-year-old who was able to untie al-Obeidi's hands and feet. This allowed her to escape, and she caught a taxi to the Rixos Hotel, where she heard there was some form of fact-finding team. She was able to enter the hotel by telling the taxi driver she worked there to get round the restriction on meeting foreign journalists. After security forces removed her from the hotel, Libyan officials bought her new clothes, and said they expected her to go on state television to say she had been kidnapped by rebels, not government forces. When she refused, she said she was taken to jail. She said interrogators pointed guns at her, poured water on her face, threw food at her, and accused her of being a traitor, in an effort to persuade her to retract her statement. Eventually, a medical exam confirmed she had been raped, and they released her. She told Cooper other girls were still being held in the building where she was assaulted, and that local residents had complained to the police about it, but that no one had acted to help them.

She said her life and reputation had been ruined by the assault and the subsequent allegations on state television that she was a whore, a prostitute, drunk, and mentally ill, and that people were laughing at her. She said there was no safe place for her in Tripoli, and that she was unable to leave the house she was staying in; when she tried to, she had been taken to the police station, then released again. She alleged that officials abducted her three times in all: once from the hotel, once when she tried thereafter to escape to Tunisia, and again on April 3 to stop her from complaining to police. She said: "My life is in danger, and I call on all human rights organization [...] to expose the truth and to let me leave now. I am being held hostage here. They have threatened me with death and told me I will never leave prison again, if I go to the journalists or tell them anything about what's happening in Tripoli."

She paid tribute to her family for standing by her, saying they had allowed her sister to study overseas without a male chaperone, and had raised both women well. When asked whether she feared someone would kill her, she replied: "I don't know. My emotions change. Sometimes I feel no, they are going to kill me. But at the same time I feel afraid but I have a motivation that says there is nothing to be afraid of. We have lost everything. What is left to be afraid of? It is done." She told Cooper: "I have reached the end of my tolerance for this as a human."

On April 5, CNN connected her by satellite phone to her mother in Tobruk, and broadcast part of the conversation. She told her mother she had been threatened in court that day by a court official, who al-Obeidi said told her he was going to "kill this failure who reports on our brigades." Other people pulled him away, and a car took her back to the house she is staying in, which she said belongs to one of her sister's friends. The next day, Nic Robertson of CNN was able to meet her and take photographs, but without sound or video.

=== April 6: On-camera interview with CNN ===
Nic Robertson and cameraman Khalil Abdallah of CNN recorded an on-camera interview with her on April 6, an interview arranged by Al-Saadi Gaddafi, one of Gaddafi's seven sons. He made his office available and sent a car for al-Obeidi. Transmission of the interview was delayed by 18 hours because Saadi Gaddafi wanted the Libyan government to review it. A spokesman did look at it and was heavily critical, but Gaddafi waved that off, according to Robertson. It was first broadcast on April 7, the first time al-Obeidi had been seen by the wider public since March 26. Ten seconds of the interview—during which al-Obeidi expressed support for people in the rebel-held east of the country and in Misrata—triggered an objection from Gaddafi. Al-Obeidi did not consent to her comments being removed, and said if they were, she would withdraw consent for the entire interview, but she later agreed to the removal so long as the interview made clear which comments had been cut.

She told Robertson she had been kidnapped by two cars belonging to the armed forces and the Gaddafi brigades. They were drunk, and took her to one of their residences, where she was tortured and raped. She said her hands and legs were tied behind her for two days. When she was released, she used her cell phone to take photographs of the bruises and marks on her body. She said she wanted to follow up on her case legally, though when she tried to begin the process in a courthouse, a court employee took a gun and threatened to kill her. She told Robertson she is an ordinary Libyan citizen, a well-educated, conservative Muslim from a good family, and everything that has been said about her by Libyan state television was a lie. She said she wanted to pursue justice and her rights under the law, had appealed to Gaddafi, and wanted Libya to be seen as a country of law: "If there is no law, I call upon all judges, district attorneys, prosecutors to stay home, and tell them that the Libyan TV is the one who investigates, and questions, and judges people, so there is no need for you." She also spoke privately to Saadi Gaddafi, describing him later as a humble and understanding man, who treated her well. Robertson wrote that Gaddafi appeared shocked after the meeting, and commented on al-Obeidi's strong character and willingness to disagree with him. He said he would take up her case, and told Robertson: "The people responsible for raping her should face charges. She is a strong woman."

During a telephone interview on April 11, al-Obeidi told Anderson Cooper she had seen one of the men who raped her; she said she saw him on the street the previous week. She said he was related to a public official who was part of Gaddafi's circle, and that she feared he might kill her.

=== April 11: Interview with NPR and AP ===
On April 11 al-Obeidi gave her first uncensored interview since March 26, after Lourdes Garcia-Navarro of National Public Radio and an Associated Press reporter managed to avoid their government minders to interview her. Al-Obeidi repeated many of the details she'd given in previous interviews, and added that the most brutal of her attackers was the son of a government minister. She also explained how she had escaped. She told NPR that, after the 16-year-old girl held with her untied al-Obeidi's hands and feet, she managed to jump out of a window, covered only in a tablecloth. The compound was surrounded by a wall, and there were two African guards sleeping by the electric gate. She said she grabbed a piece of metal and ran at them, screaming, and they opened the gate for her. After that, she was helped by people in the neighborhood, who put her in a taxi, paid the fare, and told the driver to take her to the Rixos Hotel.

She told NPR she was under intense pressure to recant her allegations; even her own lawyers want her to change her story. Garcia-Navarro reported that the government no longer denies al-Obeidi was raped, but continues to discredit her. She interviewed government spokesman Moussa Ibrahim, who said al-Obeidi "has a file" proving that she was a prostitute. For some time afterward, Libyan state television continued to run the video purportedly showing al-Obeidi dancing suggestively, but Garcia-Navarro said al-Obeidi has only nine fingers, and has scars on her stomach from an operation. The woman in the video has all 10 fingers, and no scars.

== Escape from Libya ==
On May 8, 2011, CNN announced that on May 5, she had escaped to Tunisia with the help of a defecting military officer and Libyan rebels. She wore a traditional Berber headdress to cross the border, which concealed her face, apart from one eye.

On May 11, Al Jazeera English reported that al-Obeidi had fled to Doha, the capital of Qatar, citing a report by the rebel diplomat Ali Zaidan at a press conference the same day. According to CNN, after fleeing to Tunisia, she was met at the border by French diplomats, who handed her off to Transitional National Council officials who helped her escape to Qatar.

On May 18, she granted an interview with CNN's Nic Robertson at her new home in Qatar. She said that she felt "liberated" now that she was out of Libya.

On June 2, Sybella Wilkes, a spokeswoman for the UNHCR, said that al-Obeidi had been deported from Qatar and was back in Libya, in the rebel stronghold of Benghazi. Reportedly, the National Transitional Council had pressured the Qatari government, which is allied with the rebels, to deport her. She had been in Qatar awaiting resettlement as a refugee.

=== Refugee status in the United States ===
On June 5, 2011, her sister announced that the previous day al-Obeidi had been granted asylum in the United States. On July 27, after spending 54 days at a UN refugee center in Timișoara, Romania, al-Obeidi arrived in New York City. In an interview to CNN she thanked the U.S. government and Secretary of State Hillary Clinton for their support and assistance. A refugee agency helped al-Obeidi to settle into life in the USA.

In mid-December 2011, al-Obeidi said she suffered from depression and could not find a job. She visited the Libyan Embassy in Washington, D.C. and Ambassador Ali Aujali gave her an educational scholarship and health insurance. In 2012, al-Obeidi lived in Denver where she was studying ESL.

As of 2014, she was residing in Boulder, Colorado and was living on a monthly stipend of $1,800 from the Libyan embassy.

== Response ==
=== Governments and international organizations ===
The Libyan National Transitional Council released a statement on March 27, 2011, condemning the treatment of al-Obeidi as "criminal, barbaric, and an unpardonable violence against her dignity, the dignity of the Libyan people, and all of humanity" and demanding the immediate release of both al-Obeidi and all other women, children, journalists, and civilians being held by Gaddafi and his regime.

Britain's Foreign Secretary William Hague said incidents of such sexual violence in Libya were a demonstration of Gaddafi government's "absolute disregard for any understanding of human rights." The Human Rights Sub-Committee of the European Parliament demanded her immediate release, and said the incident was "emblematic of the situation of dissident women in Libya." Amnesty International called al-Obeidi's story "stomach-churning", and demanded that she be released that an investigation be opened.

=== Mainstream and social media ===
The story spread within hours around the world, with video and photos going viral on the Internet. Time magazine called the story "the Libyan regime's other crisis," adding that her charges "could not have been more dramatic—or more badly timed for the regime of Libyan dictator". Canadian journalist Neil Macdonald dismissed the Libyan government's response as "ham-fisted, dull-witted" damage control, based on his experience in the Arab world where "rape ... is routinely used as a punishment by security forces." He called her act "not just incredibly courageous but near-suicidal", because of the social repercussions suffered by rape victims in societies like Gaddafi's Libya. He suggested she was a real hero who deserved to be seated beside the First Lady of the United States during the next State of the Union address.

A number of hashtags associated with her story appeared on Twitter, including #EmanAlObeidy, #EmanAlObeidi, #EmanAlObaidy and #WhereIsEmanAlObeidy. A petition was launched on Avaaz.org calling on the Turkish government to intervene on her behalf and had collected 500,000 signatures by April 3.

=== Public protests ===
External image
- Libyan-American women from around the DC metropolitan area demonstrate to show solidarity with Iman Al-Obaidi in Lafayette Park in front of the White House. (Arabian Business/Getty Images)

A group of mostly women in Benghazi marched with posters in support of al-Obeidi on March 27.

On March 30, a group of North African women held a rally along Pennsylvania Avenue near the White House. They dismissed the Libyan officials' allegations that al-Obeidi was drunk, mentally unstable, or a prostitute, as signs of oppression, and said that "what happened to Eman has been happening to thousands of male and female Libyans. That's how Gadhafi retaliates against civilians, by violating their honor." The group said they planned to rally every week until al-Obeidi was found.

== Recognition ==
Recognizing the prominence that Iman al-Obeidi incident gained worldwide, BBC included her in the list of "Faces of the year 2011", or women who made international headlines, for the month of March. The list featured al-Obeidi along with US Congresswomen Gabby Giffords and Michele Bachmann, Brazilian president Dilma Rousseff, and Prince Albert of Monaco spouse Charlene Wittstock.

== Position of sex-crime victims in Libya ==
David Kirkpatrick of The New York Times writes that rape is often seen in Libya as a crime against the honor of a woman or her family, rather than an attack against an individual. Women who have been raped risked being shunned, or forced to marry the rapist. They may be confined for years in rehabilitation centers, where according to human rights advocates they are deprived of education except for lessons about Islam, placed in solitary confinement or handcuffed if they resist, and subjected to what Kirkpatrick calls unscientific virginity tests. They are allowed to leave only when released by a husband, or when a man offers to marry them. Kirkpatrick writes that, according to one Human Rights Watch source, men arrive at the centers looking, in part, for docile wives.

== Legal troubles in the US and assault convictions ==
In February 2014, al-Obeidi was arrested in Boulder, Colorado on a second-degree assault charge after physically attacking two patrons at a downtown bar, seriously wounding one. In May 2015, she was convicted of the 2014 assault after the jury rejected her claim of self-defense. A Class 4 felony, the charge carries a sentence of up to 6 years in prison.

Prior to this incident, she had been arrested three times in Colorado: for disorderly conduct, resisting arrest and assault. In the second of these incidents, in August 2013, she was initially charged with second-degree felony assault on a police officer and misdemeanor counts of third-degree assault, obstructing a police officer and resisting arrest. The following September, the charges were reduced to a single misdemeanor count of attempted third-degree assault to which al-Obeidi pleaded guilty, and the court imposed one year of probation and ordered her to seek mental health counseling and help for alcohol abuse. While still on probation and while on bond for the February 2014 assault, she was arrested in November 2014 for having tested positive for opiates and alcohol. The following December, she was sentenced to seven months of work release for that violation. However, after violating the terms of that program, al-Obeidi was confined at the Boulder County Jail in January 2015.

On September 2, 2015, al-Obeidi was sentenced in Boulder District Court to 6 years in prison for the February 2014 assault. In denying a request by al-Obeidi's attorney Eric Zale for reconsideration of the sentence after 120 days and possible probation, Judge Andrew Macdonald said, "It's terrible, I don't know how else to describe it... It is really clear to me that Ms. Ali has a pretty serious mental health issue, most likely related to the trauma in Libya. But it's also concerning that she is refusing to get treatment." Concluding the hearing, Judge Macdonald told al-Obeidi, "I have grave concerns that when you get out, you'll be right back in this situation."
