= Sabratha University =

University in Libya

Sabratha University (SBU)
- جامعة صبراتة
- Motto: Arabic: وَقُل رَّبِّ زِدْنِي عِلْمًا
- Motto in English: O my Lord! advance me in knowledge
- Type: Public
- Established: 2015; 11 years ago
- Location: Sabratha, Libya
- Colors: Blue Sky and Sunglow
- Website: http://www.sabu.edu.ly/

Sabratha University (Arabic: جامعة صبراتة "Jamaa't Subrata") is one of Libya's largest public universities. It was established in 2015 in the city of Sabratha, Libya with 18 campuses spread throughout cities on the coast west of the capital Tripoli.

== See also ==
- List of universities in Libya
- Education in Libya
