= El Mehrass Mosque =

Mosque in Tunis, Tunisia

- جامع المهراس
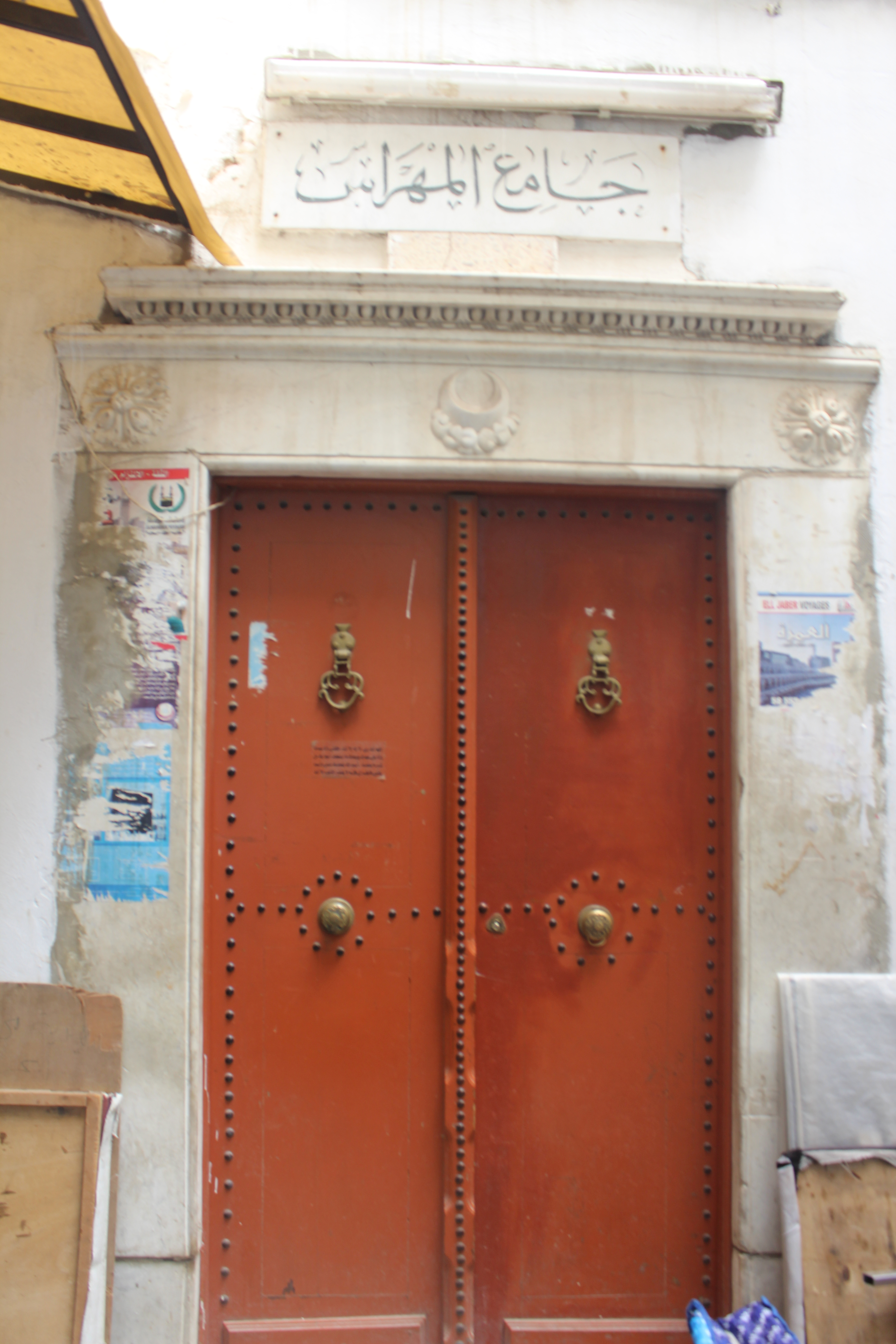

- Tunisia

Religion
- Affiliation: Sunni Islam

Location
- Location: Tunis, Tunisia
- Interactive map of El Mehrass Mosque
- Coordinates: 36.799351944444°N 10.1749875°E

Architecture
- Type: Mosque

El Mehrass Mosque ' (Arabic: جامع المهراس) is a small mosque in the east of the medina of Tunis.

== Localization ==
It is located in 1 Jemaa Al-Zaytuna Street, originally named the Church Street.

== History ==
According to the historian Mohamed Belkodja, the mosque was built during the Khurasanid era, a local dystany that ruled Tunis between 1059 and 1158. It was restored after the independence of the country. At the entrance of the mosque, there are some Kufi quotes inscribed on the stones that allowed the historians to get an idea about the period of construction. Abû El-Abas Ahmad El-Karoui (Arabic: أبو العباس أحمد القروي) was one of the imams who studied in Al-Zaytuna university and died in 1855.

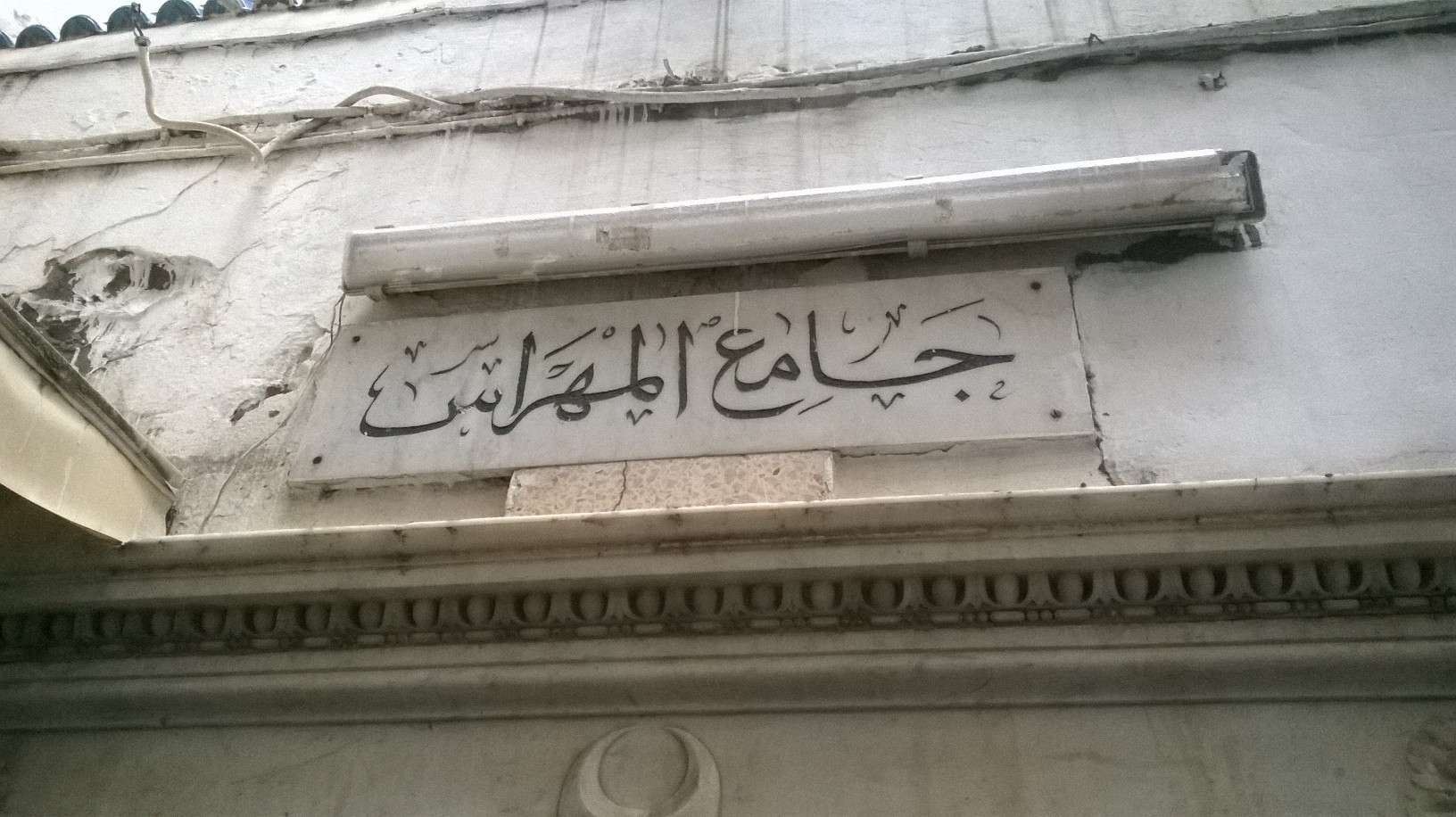
Marbel panel with the name of the mosque

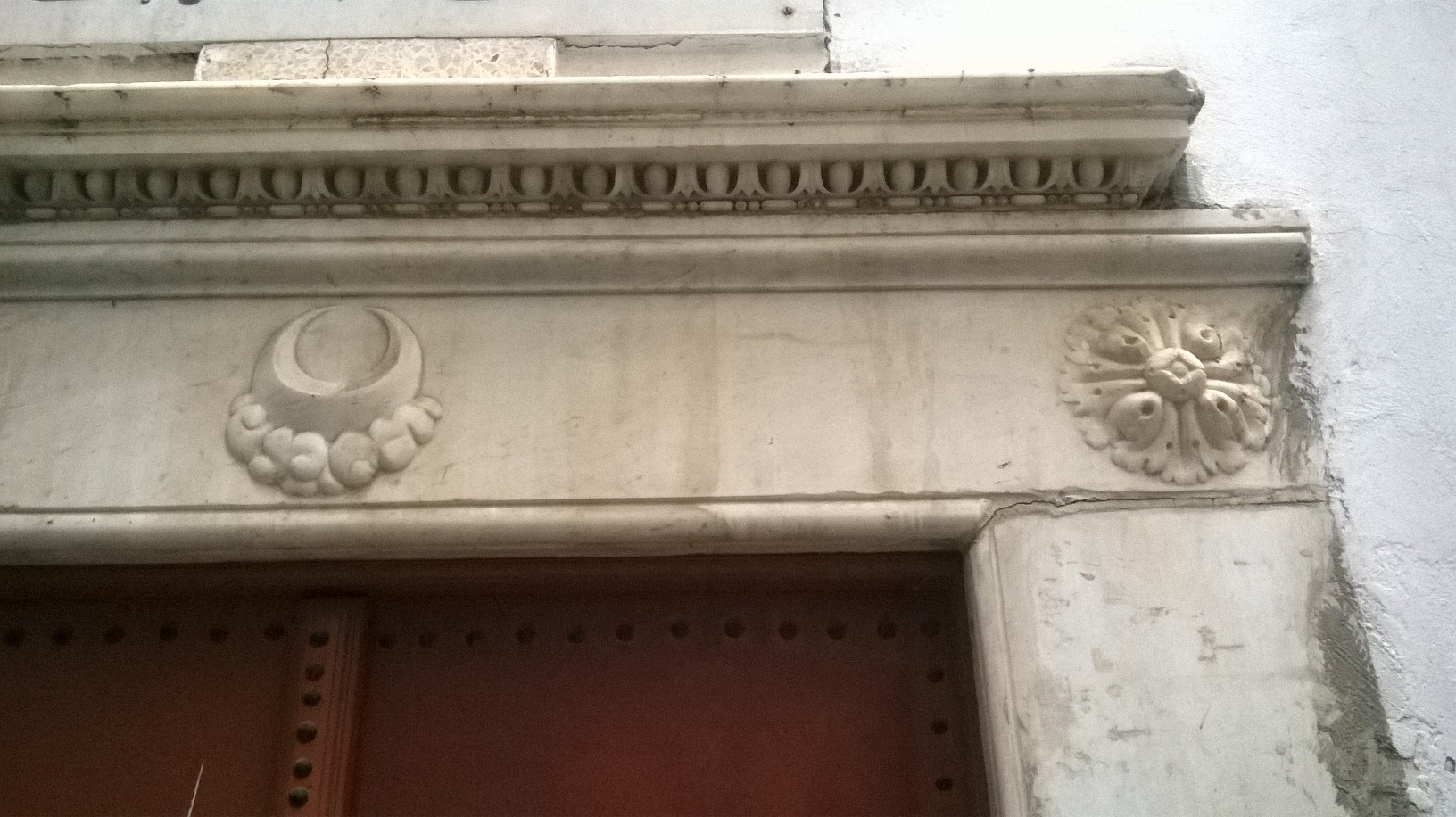
Symbols at the entrance of the mosque

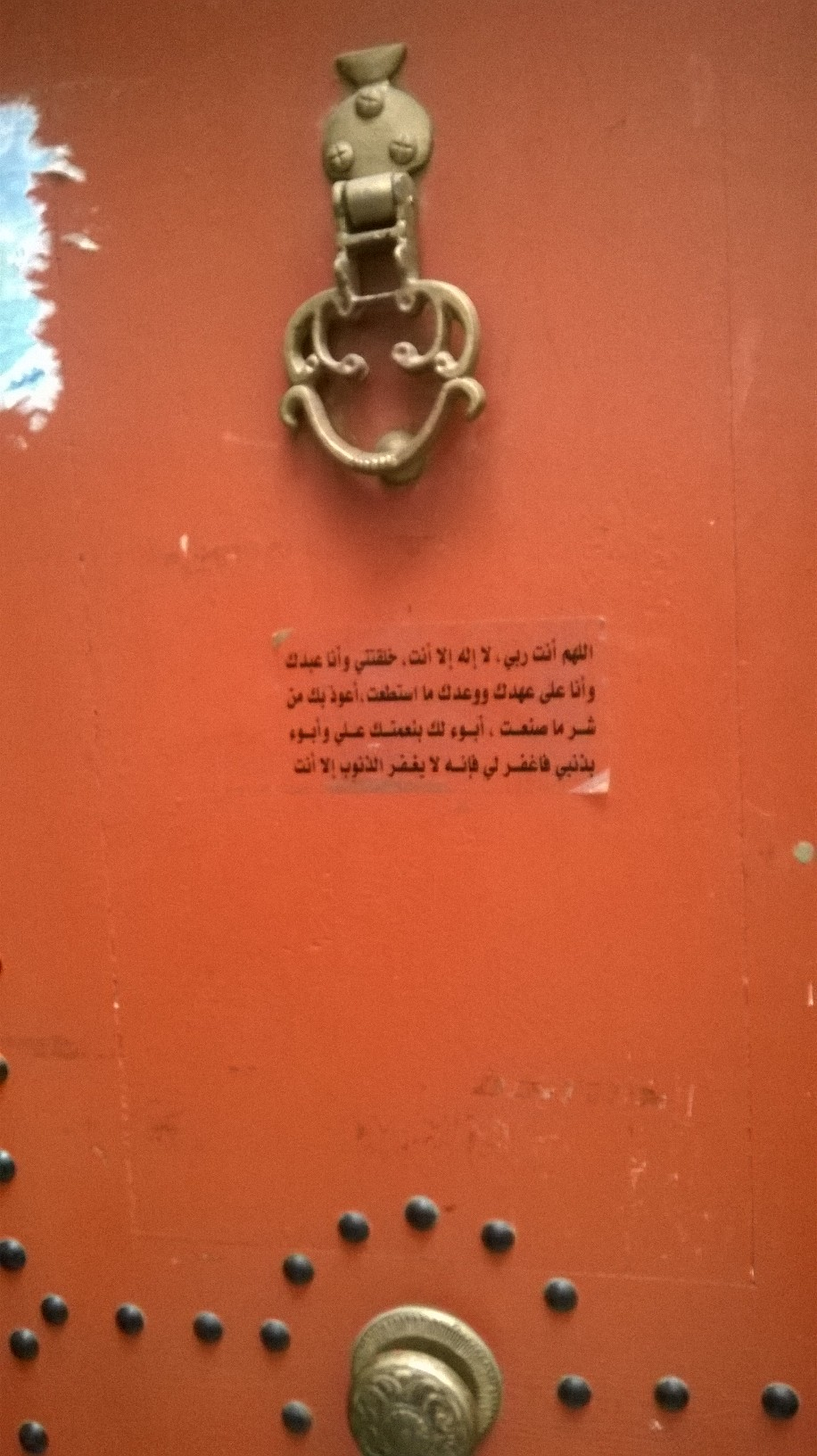
Decoration of the entrance

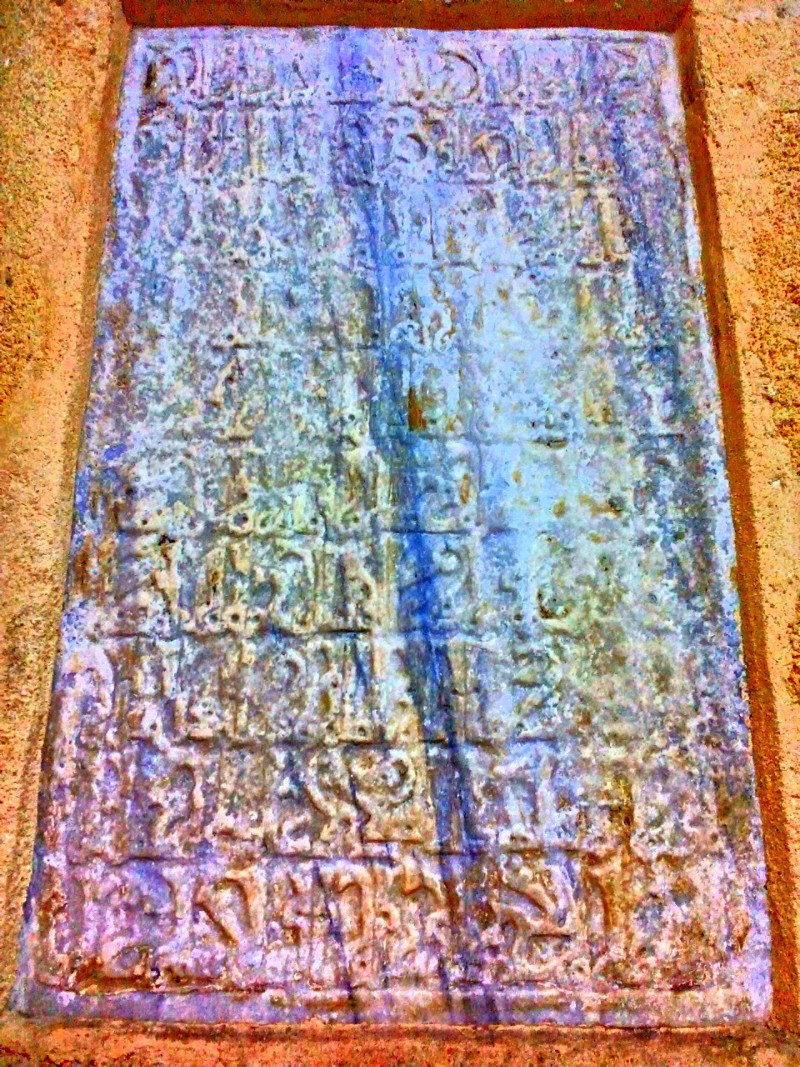
Quotes with the Kufi style
