= Libya–Qatar relations =

- Libya: Qatar

Libya–Qatar relations are the bilateral relations between Libya and State of Qatar. The two countries are members of the Arab League, Organisation of Islamic Cooperation and the United Nations.

== History ==
=== Pre-Civil War ===
Qatar was a staunch ally of Gaddafi’s Libya, with Qatari Emir Hamad bin Khalifa Al Thani crediting Gaddafi with standing with Qatar in the face of bigger countries, according to leaked recordings.

=== Libyan civil wars ===
Qatar was the second country to recognise the NTC and the first to announce a trade agreement with it, declaring on 27 March 2011 that it would market Libyan oil exports from eastern terminals controlled by anti-Gaddafi elements. It was also the first Arab country to join international military operations in Libya, sending interceptors to help enforce the no-fly zone starting on 25 March. The Qatari government is also closely tied to Al Jazeera, one of the first international news networks to begin covering the 2011 civil war.

The NTC faced one of its first diplomatic quandaries after Iman al-Obeidi, a Libyan woman who accused Gaddafi-loyal militiamen of beating and gang-raping her at a checkpoint in a high-profile appearance before journalists at the Rixos Al Nasr in Tripoli, was granted asylum in Qatar. Despite the protests of the United Nations High Commissioner for Refugees, Qatar then forcibly deported Obeidi back to Benghazi on 2 June 2011 for unknown reasons, and Obeidi publicly blamed the NTC for her deportation. Despite this incident, Qatari cooperation with the NTC remained close throughout the war, with close consultations between officials of the two governments in Doha becoming so frequent that some anti-Gaddafi fighters complained that their leadership was spending too much time in Qatar and not enough time in Libya. Qatari military advisers also reportedly accompanied some anti-Gaddafi brigades in the Nafusa Mountains and during the coastal offensive in Tripolitania, even helping to direct some fighters in the storming of Gaddafi's Bab al-Azizia compound in central Tripoli.

On 16 October 2011, the Qatari and Libyan governments signed a memorandum of understanding in Doha for cooperation between the justice ministries of the two states. Officials said the fledgling government of Libya could benefit from Qatar's experience in establishing justice, law and order. Libya, which supported Saudi Arabia during the 2017 Qatar diplomatic crisis, also cut diplomatic ties with Qatar.

During the Second Libyan Civil War, Qatar provided political and financial support for the UN-backed Government of National Accord (GNA).

== Resident diplomatic missions ==
- Libya has an embassy in Doha.
- Qatar has an embassy in Tripoli.
