= Al Said Mustafa Ahmad Abu Al Kheir =

Egyptian lawyer and writer

- Born: 4 March 1957 (age 69); Egypt
- Occupations: Lawyer, writer, lecturer

Al Said Mustafa Ahmad Abu Al Kheir (Arabic: السيد مصطفى أحمد أبو الخير) is an Egyptian lawyer and writer, specializing in legal literature; he is the author of many research papers and published books.

== Education ==
He obtained a Bachelor of Laws from the Faculty of Law at Zagazig University in 1983. He then obtained a master of law degree in public international law in 1997 from the Faculty of Law at Ain Shams University, and a PhD in public international law from the Faculty of Law at Zagazig University in 2005 with a thesis entitled "The General Theory of Military Blocs According to the Rules of Public International Law" (Original title: alnazariat aleamat liltakatulat aleaskariat wfqan liqawaeid alqanun alduwalii aleama). He also got a diploma in international law in 1990 and another diploma in public law in 1997.

== Career ==
He worked as a lawyer from 1984 until 2002, when he retired early, to begin his work as a freelance lawyer before the Court of Cassation, the Supreme Constitutional Court, the Supreme Administrative Court and the Supreme Values in 2002. Academically, he is an academic supervisor at the International Academy of Studies and the Faculty of International Law at the Scandinavian University in Norway . He also worked as a lecturer in international law and international relations at the National Defense College at Nasser Military Academy in Cairo, and in public international law, international organizations and international relations at the Faculty of Law of Omar Al-Mukhtar University in Libya.

== Works ==
=== Scientific research ===
· The Iraq-Iran conflict (first Gulf War) according to the rules of public international law, 1989

· The principle of the right to self-determination and its application to the Palestinian people, research submitted to the General Bar Association in Egypt, 1990

· Criminal responsibility for crimes against the environment, research presented to the Egyptian Association of Criminal Law, 1992

· Law and human rights, research presented to the General Bar, 1994

· Extent of the Supreme Constitutional Court's Jurisdiction to Decide on the Validity of Membership in the People's Assembly, 1997

· The political philosophy of His Majesty and Highness King Abdulaziz Al Saud, a paper presented to the Saudi Consulate in Suez on the occasion of the National Day of the Kingdom of Saudi Arabia, 2000

· The Waqf and its Political and Social Effects, Research Presented to the Waqf Foundation in Kuwait, 2001.

· Law No. (1) of 2000 and its Legal Effects, Research Presented to the General Bar, 2001.

· Customary Marriage in Sharia and Law, Research Presented to the General Bar Association, 2002

· A legal study on the subpoena for the chairman and editor-in-chief of Al-Ahram Press Foundation, 2002.

· The Role of Law, Legitimacy and Human Rights in Supporting Arab Right, Research Presented to the Permanent Office of Asian and African Writers in Cairo, 2002

· The impact of the World Trade Organization (GATT) on the Arab region, 2003

· The theory of war between Islamic law and contemporary international law, research submitted to the International Commission for Scientific Miracles in the Book and the Sunnah, 2006

· Violation of international legitimacy in Guantanamo, research published in the Journal of International Politics, Center for Political and Strategic Studies, Al-Ahram Press Foundation, Cairo, 2006

· Private education between rejection and acceptance, research published in the Journal of Sultan Qaboos University in Oman, issue file, 2006

· International legitimacy and Guantanamo Bay, research in the Journal of Law issued by the College of Law, University of Aden, Yemen Arab Republic, issue fourteen, 2007

· Embassies of the Sovereign Military Order of the Knights of Malta and Contemporary International Law, 2007

· Legal Aspects of Private International Military and Security Companies in Contemporary International Law, 2007

· National liberation movements in contemporary international law

· Legal protection for the consumer, a research published in the Kingdom of Saudi Arabia in the Economic Journal

· Some of Sudan's internal crises and contemporary international law, a research that will be published in the Journal of Law, College of Law, Kuwait University

· Legal and Policy Aspects of International Private Military Companies

==== Books ====
#	Book name	Year published	Publisher	No. of pages	ISBN	References
1	The texts of human rights charters, declarations and conventions (Original title: nusus almawathiq wal'iielanat walaitifaqiaat lihuquq al'iinsan)	2005	Itrak for printing, publishing and distribution, Cairo	376	978-977-383-049-6	
2	Military globalization alliances and international law (Original title: tahalufat aleawlamat aleaskariat walqanun alduwliu)	2005	Itrak for printing, publishing and distribution, Cairo	368	978-977-383-029-8	
3	Military Globalization Alliance Documents (Original title: wathayiq tahaluf aleawlamat aleaskaria)	2005	Itrak for printing, publishing and distribution, Cairo	295	978-977-383-048-9	
4	The Statute of the International Criminal Court: The Rules of Procedure, Evidence and Elements of International Crimes (Original title: alnizam al'asasiu lilmahkamat aljinayiyat alduwliati: walqawaeid al'iijrayiyat waqawaeid al'iithbat wa'arkan aljarayim alduwalia)	2005	Itrak for printing, publishing and distribution, Cairo	385	978-977-383-039-7	
5	General theory of military alliances (Original title: alnazariat aleamat lil'ahlaf aleaskaria)	2005	Itrak for printing, publishing and distribution, Cairo	597	978-977-383-032-8	
6	General principles in contemporary international law (Original title: almabadi aleamat fi alqanun alduwlaa almueasir)	2006	Itrak for printing, publishing and distribution, Cairo	371	978-977-383-077-9	
7	Syrian withdrawal from Lebanon and international law (with documents) (Original title: alainsihab alsuwriu min lubnan walqanun alduwlii (bialwathayiqi))	2006	Itrak for printing, publishing and distribution, Cairo	179	978-977-383-053-3	
8	Separation wall fatwa and international law (Original title: fatwaa aljidar aleazil walqanun aldawliu)	2006	Itrak for printing, publishing and distribution, Cairo	153	978-977-383-054-0	
9	Sudan's internal crises and contemporary international law (Original title: 'azamat alsuwdan aldaakhiliat walqanun alduwliu almueasir)	2006	Itrak for printing, publishing and distribution, Cairo	312	978-977-383-055-7	
10	The final say in drawing the vowels of cutting and connection, a study of the characteristics of Arabic writing and its most important foundations (Original title: alqawl alfasl fi rasm himazataa alqitae walwasl bahath fi khasayis alkitabat alearabiat wa'ahamu asisiha)	2006	Nancy Library	92	–	
11	Latin America and Brazil: Researches on language, place, and human history (Original title: Latin America and Brazil: Researches on language, place, and human history)	2006	Friends House (Arabic: دار الأصدقاء)	238	–	
12	The morals of the pharaoh as told by the Holy Qur’an and a hadith about the status of Aaron and Moses, peace be upon them (Original title: 'akhlaq alfireawn kama hakaaha alquran alkarim wahadith ean manzilat harun wamusaa ealayhima alsalam)	2007	Nancy Library	167	–	
13	technology transfer contracts (Original title: euqud naql altiknulujia)	2007	Itrak for printing, publishing and distribution, Cairo	591	978-977-383-109-7	
14	The strategy of imposing globalization, mechanisms and means of protection (Original title: 'iistratijiat fard aleawlamat alaliat wawasayil alhimaya)	2008	Itrak for printing, publishing and distribution, Cairo	294	978-977-383-135-6	
15	International Convention for the Protection of Cultural Diversity (read and note) (Original title: alaitifaqiat alduwliat lihimayat altanawue althaqafii (qira'at wamulahazatun))	2008	Personal publication	98	–	
16	Private international military and security companies: a legal and political study (Original title: alsharikat aleaskariat wal'amniat aldawaliat alkhasatu: dirasat qanuniat siasia)	2008	Itrak for printing, publishing and distribution, Cairo	268	978-977-383-136-3	
17	International Law of Border Disputes: An Applied Study on Arab and Islamic Borders (Original title: alqanun alduwaliu limunazaeat alhududi: dirasat tatbiqiat ealaa alhudud alearabiat wal'iislamia)	2009	Itrak for printing, publishing and distribution, Cairo	335	978-977-383-203-2	
18	Legal ways to try Israel leaders and individuals in international law with documents (Original title: alturuq alqanuniat limuhakamat 'iisrayiyl qadat wa'afrad fi alqanun alduwalii bialwathayiq)	2009	Itrak for printing, publishing and distribution, Cairo	281	978-977-383-170-7	
19	The recent war on Gaza in light of public international law: the Palestinian crossings..a legal and political vision (Original title: alharb al'akhirat ealaa ghazat fi daw' alqanun alduwalii aleami: almaeabir alfilastiniati.. ruyat qanuniat siasia)	2009	Itrak for printing, publishing and distribution, Cairo	205	978-977-383-165-3	
20	The state in public international law (Original title: aldawlat fi alqanun alduwalii aleami)	2009	Itrak for printing, publishing and distribution, Cairo	411	978-977-383-162-2	
21	The future of war: studies and documents: the four Geneva Conventions of 1949 and the two Additional Protocols of 1977 (Original title: mustaqbal alhuruba: dirasat wawathayiqi: atifaqiaat jinif al'arbaeat 1949 walburutukulin al'iidafiayn 1977)	2009	Egypt Arab Publishing and Distribution, Cairo	431	978-977-5471-70-3	
22	The general theory of military alliances and blocs according to the rules of public international law (Original title: alnazariat aleamat fi al'ahlaf waltakatulat aleaskariat tbqaan liqawaeid alqanun alduwalii aleami)	2010	Center for Arab Unity Studies	400	978-9953-82-300-3	
23	Arab and Islamic resistance in contemporary international law (Original title: almuqawamat alearabiat wal'iislamiat fi alqanun alduwalii almueasir)	2011	Itrak for printing, publishing and distribution, Cairo	354	978-977-383-211-6	
24	Settlement and Palestinian refugees between the right of return and the settlement plot (Original title: altawtin wallaajiuwn alfilastiniuwn bayn haqi aleawdat wamuamarat altawtin)	2012	Itrak for printing, publishing and distribution, Cairo	–	–	
25	The Palestinian issue in international law (Original title: alqadiat alfilastiniat fi alqanun alduwalii)	2012	Itrak for printing, publishing and distribution, Cairo	279	–	
26	The legal system to protect the rights of victims of human trafficking: a comparative study between Islamic jurisprudence and positive systems in light of the statute of the International Criminal Court and related conventions and laws (presentation) (Original title: alnizam alqanuniu lihimayat huquq dahaya alaitijar bialbashari: dirasat muqaranat bayn alfiqh al'iislamii wal'anzimat alwadeiat fi daw' alnizam al'asasii lilmahkamat aljinayiyat alduwaliat walaitifaqiaat walqawanin dhat alsila (taqdimi))	2014	National Center for Legal Publications, Cairo	340	978-977-6223-86-8	
27	International treaties: the principle of prohibition of the use of force, the right to legitimate defense and the right to self-determination (Original title: almueahadat alduwliatu: mabda hazr aistikhdam alquat wahaqi aldifae alshareii wahaqi taqrir almisi)	2016	Curriculum House for Publishing and Distribution, Amman	328	978-9957-18-397-4	
28	A legal and political view of the events of the Egyptian revolution (Original title: ruyat qanuniat siasiat li'ahdath althawrat almisria)	2016	Curriculum House for Publishing and Distribution, Amman	360	978-9957-18-381-3	
29	Legal ways to prosecute perpetrators of international crimes in Syria in international law (Original title: alturuq alqanuniat limuhakamat murtakibi aljarayim alduwliat bisuria fi alqanun alduwalii)	2016	Curriculum House for Publishing and Distribution, Amman	240	978-9957-18-380-6	

== Memberships ==
· Member of the General Secretariat of the Arab and Islamic Gathering to Support the Choice of Resistance, Beirut

· Member of the Scientific Advisory Committee of the Encyclopedia of Scientific Miracles in the Qur’an and Sunnah

· Member of the International Commission for Scientific Miracles in the Qur’an and Sunnah

· Member of the International Coalition to Combat Impunity, Beirut

· Member of the General Secretariat of the National Alliance to Support Arab and Islamic Resistance, Beirut

· Member of the Scientific Advisory Board of the Nadwa Journal for Legal Studies, Algeria

· Member of the advisory board of the Law Journal, Faculty of Law, University of Jerash, Jordan

· Member of the scientific committee of the Jill Research Center for Human Rights

· Faculty Member, Faculty of Law and Politics, Department of Law, Ibn Rushd University, The Netherlands

· Member of the Islamic Bar Association of the Organization of the Islamic Conference

· Member of the Scientific Advisory Board of the Journal of Jurisprudence and Legal Nawazil in Laghouat, Algeria, issued by the Research Center in Islamic Sciences and Civilization
