= Mabrouka al-Tabiba =

Libyan midwife

- مبروكة الطبيبة
- Born: 1926; At Tamimi
- Died: 2017 (aged 90–91); Bayda
- Monuments: Mabrouka al-Tabiba Mosque; Mabrouka al-Tabiba Market
- Occupation: Midwife

Mabrouka al-Tabiba, in Arabic: مبروكة الطبيبة was a midwife from Libya. Born in 1926 in the village of At Tamimi in northeastern Libya, she grew up fluent in Italian. In 1941, she joined a nursing study program in the Italian capital, Rome. She returned in 1951 to work as a midwife in the Jebel Akhdar region, settling in the city of Bayda. During her career, she supervised more than 30,000 births.

Al-Tabiba was considered one of the symbols of Bayda. The people called her 'Mother of the City', and the neighborhood she lived in was called Mabrouka al-Tabiba in her honour; her name was also given to its market and mosque. She died on 5 January 2017, at the age of 91.
