= Al Zawiya University =

University in Zawia, Libya

Coordinates: 32°45′N 12°43′E

University of Zawia
- Type: Independent university
- Established: 1988; 37 years ago
- Location: Zawiya, Libya

The University of Zawia (Arabic: جامعة الزاوية, romanized: Jamaa't Azzawia, previously known as Seventh of April University) is a university located in the city of Zawiya, Libya. It was established as an independent university in 1988. The campus is six kilometres south of the city centre, and serves the Zawiya, Jafara and Nuqat al Khams districts.

== History ==
In 1983, University of Tripoli established a branch of their College of Education in Zawia. In 1988, the institution was established as an independent university, called the Seventh of April University, with separate administration and funding. The reference to 7 April was officially described by the university as referring to "the great student event on the seventh of April 1976". On 7 April 1976, student protests took place in Tripoli and Benghazi protesting against human rights violations, calling for a civilian government and free and fair elections. Counterdemonstrations took place on the same day and "many students were detained for months". The date of 7 April was used from the first anniversary on 7 April 1977 and annually to the late 1980s as a date for public executions in Libya in reference to the "great student event". The Organizing Committee for the April Demonstration referred to the usage of the 7 April anniversary as a "trademark" of Muammar Gaddafi's government.

The university was renamed in 2011, the year of the Libyan Revolution that overthrew Gaddafi, as the University of Zawia.

== See also ==
- List of Islamic educational institutions
- List of universities in Uganda
- Education in Libya
