= Azzaytuna University =

Public university in Libya

- جامعة الزيتونة
- Former names: Al-Naser
- Type: Public
- Established: 1986; 39 years ago
- Administrative staff: 750–1200
- Location: Tarhuna, Libya
- Website: https://azu.edu.ly/

The Azzaytuna University (AZU) (Arabic: جامعة الزيتونة), previously known as Naser National University University, is the one of public universities in Libya. It is located in Tarhuna city – Libya. It was established in 1986, and it was renamed as Azzaytuna University in 2012 by the Cabinet Decree No. 168/2012.

== Degrees ==
The university provides undergraduate and postgraduate levels of study and awards the following degrees:

- Intermediate Certificate (Diploma).
- Bachelor's degree.
- Licentiate's degree
- Master's degree

== Faculties ==
Azzaytuna University has 5 campuses (Tarhuna, Souk Al-Ahad, Al-Qusay'ah, Al-Awata and Souk Al-Juma'a).

Faculties of Azzaytuna University
- Faculty of Engineering
- Faculty Of Economics and Political Sciences
- Faculty of Science
- Faculty of Education
- Faculty of Law
- Faculty of Languages
- Faculty of Arts
- Faculty of Fine Arts & Media
- Faculty of Agriculture
- Faculty of Physical Education
- Faculty of Social Sciences
- Faculty of Sharia
- Faculty of Veterinary Medicine
- Faculty of Tourism And Archeology
- Faculty of Information Technology
- Faculty of Medicine And Health Sciences
- Faculty of Medical Technology
- Faculty of Managerial And Financial Sciences
- Faculty of Graduate Studies

=== Departments ===
- Department of Computer Engineering.
- Department of Civil Engineering.
- Department of Mechanical and Industrial Engineering.
  - Division of Power
  - Division of Industrial
  - Division of Applied
- Department of Electrical and Electronic Engineering.
  - Division of Power
  - Division of Control
  - Division of Telecommunication

=== Faculty of Sciences ===
==== Departments ====
- Department of Agricultural Science.
- Department of Computer science.
- Department of Environmental Sciences.
- Department of Technical Biology.

=== Faculty of Education ===
Study at faculty is by year system (four years) to academic year 2007/2008; then the study changed to academic class from 2008/2009; as the study period depends on what the student has fulfilled of courses as requirements for graduation, then the student grants the bachelor's degree of science and education or bachelor's degree of arts and education. All branches of specialized high schools are accepted in the faculty.

==== Departments ====
- Department of Arabic Language.
- Department of Classroom Teacher.
- Department of English Language.
- Department of Kindergarten.
- Department of Physics.
- Department of Chemistry.
- Department of Biology.
- Department of Math.
- Department of Art and Music Education.

=== Faculty Of Economics and Political Sciences ===
==== Departments ====
- Department of Economics.
- Department of Management.
- Department of Accountancy.
- Department of Political Science.
- Department of Banking and Finance.
- Department of Financial Planning

=== Faculty of Languages ===
==== Departments ====
- Department of Arabic Language.
- Department of English Language.

=== Faculty of Law ===
==== Departments ====
- Department of Public Law.
- Department of Private Law.
- Department of General Subjects.

== See also ==
- Education in Libya
- List of universities in Libya
