= Ministry of Technical and Vocational Education (Libya) =

- وزارة التعليم التقني والفني

Agency overview
- Formed: March 2021; 5 years ago
- Jurisdiction: Libya
- Headquarters: Tripoli, Libya
- Minister responsible: Yakhlef Al-Sifao, Minister of Technical and Vocational Education (Acting)
- Parent agency: Government of National Unity
- Website: tve.gov.ly

The Ministry of Technical and Vocational Education (Arabic: وزارة التعليم التقني والفني) is one of the ministries of the Government of National Unity in Libya. It is the government body responsible for organizing and developing the technical education and vocational training sector in the country. The ministry aims to train people to meet labor market requirements and support economic development. As of 2022, it supervised about 520 vocational schools with more than 48,000 total students.

== History ==
Historically, the technical and vocational education sector was a department within the Ministry of General Education. However, recognizing the importance of this type of education as an independent sector, it was separated, and an autonomous ministry was established.

The Ministry of Technical and Vocational Education was founded in its current form with the formation of the Government of National Unity in March 2021, headed by Abdul Hamid Dbeibeh.

== See also ==
- Education in Libya
