= Al-Mergib University =

Public university in Al Khums, Libya

- Type: public university
- Location: Al Khums, Libya

Elmergib University is a public university in Al Khums, Libya. It was previously known as Intifada University and Nasser University.

== See also ==
- List of universities in Uganda
- Education in Libya
