= Nic Robertson =

British journalist

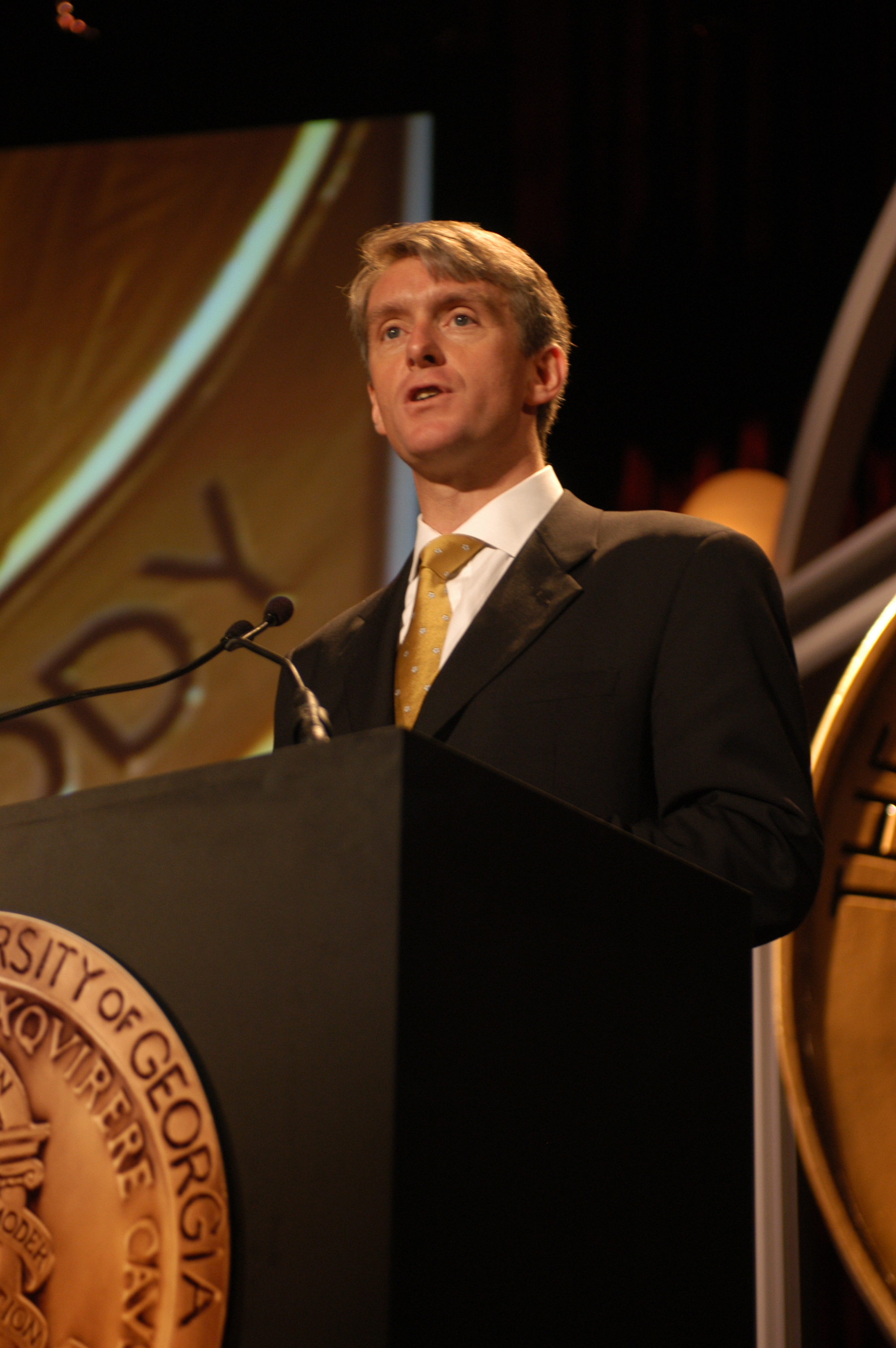
- Accepting a Peabody Award in May 2003
- Born: Dominic Robertson; 1962 (age 63–64); United Kingdom
- Occupation: Journalist
- Years active: 1984 – present
- Spouse: Margaret Lowrie

Dominic Robertson (born 1962) is the international diplomatic editor of CNN.

== Career ==
Robertson joined CNN in 1990 and is currently the network's international diplomatic editor, based in London. His reporting has focused on global terrorism and armed conflict, particularly in Afghanistan, the former Yugoslavia, Pakistan, Afghanistan, Syria, and Libya.

In the 1990s, Robertson covered the breakup of Yugoslavia as a producer and reported from Baghdad, Iraq, during the First Gulf War. He was one of very few Western broadcast journalists reporting from Afghanistan at the time of the September 11 attacks in 2001. He reported from Iraq in 2002 and early 2003 in the lead-up to the invasion of Iraq by the United States; from New Orleans in 2005 in the aftermath of Hurricane Katrina; from Beirut in 2006 during the Israel-Lebanon crisis; and from Norway in the aftermath of the 2011 massacre perpetrated by Anders Behring Breivik. During the Arab Spring, Robertson reported from Libya, covering the Libyan Civil War and interviewing Saif al-Islam Gaddafi and Al-Saadi Gaddafi (the sons of Muammar Gaddafi) and Iman al-Obeidi. Robertson reported from Bahrain during the Bahraini uprising of 2011 and was the only Western television journalist to interview Salman, Crown Prince of Bahrain. He went into Gaza on an embed with the Israeli army during the 2023 Israel-Hamas war. In 2024, Robertson was accused by Al Jazeera of knowingly publishing false information related to the 2023 Israel-Hamas war.

== Awards ==
Robertson has won two Overseas Press Club Awards, two Peabody Awards (2002 and 2012), an Alfred I. duPont-Columbia Award, and several Emmy Awards, including a 1992 News & Documentary Emmy for Saving Somalia. Robertson's 2002 Peabody Award was for Terror on Tape, his reporting on al-Qaeda training videos in Afghanistan.

Robertson's CNN report Syria: Frontline Town – Zabadani won him both the 2012 Prix Bayeux TV War Correspondent of the Year award and The New York Festivals 2013 Award for Coverage of a Continuing News Story.

Robertson's documentary World's Untold Stories: Secrets of the Belfast Project, which revealed new evidence on Sinn Féin-IRA connections, won a Foreign Press Association Member Award.

People magazine voted him "Sexiest News Correspondent" in 2001.

== Film portrayal ==
Robertson was portrayed by the actor Matt Keeslar in the movie Live from Baghdad.

== Personal life ==
Robertson is a native of the UK and is married to former CNN correspondent Margaret Lowrie. The couple have two daughters. They live in London.
