= Omar Al-Mukhtar University =

University in Bayda, Libya

- Type: Public
- Established: 1961; 65 years ago
- Students: 26.220(as of 2023)
- Location: Bayda, Libya; 32°45′30″N 21°42′44″E
- Campus: 460 acres (1.9 km^{2})
- Website: http://www.omu.edu.ly/

Omar Al-Mukhtar University (Arabic: جامعة عمر المختار) Is a public university in Bayda, Libya. it is the third largest university in Libya after the University of Tripoli and the University of Benghazi. It was founded in 1961 and grew to be a moderately religious institute that taught practice regarding scripture reading and interpretation. However, after Muammar Gaddafi's 1969 coup d'état, educational reforms were implemented that caused the shutdown of the Islamic departments, replacing them with scientific departments.

The first University in Bayda city, it has four campuses in the following cities, Bayda (the Old University and the New University), Al Qubah, Derna (Derna University) and Tobruk (Tobruk University). it has twenty faculties on all campuses, and educates students from many locations, including Malta, Cyprus, Egypt, Malaysia, Indonesia, Sudan, and Chad.

The Agriculture Building is the oldest on the Bayda campus and is alone capable of housing several thousand students, OAMU now hosts twenty-three faculties on four campuses which follow the General People's Committee for Higher Education and is officially accredited and recognized by the Ministry of Higher Education and Scientific Research, Libya.

== See also ==
- Education in Libya
- List of universities in Libya
