= Education in Libya =

Education in Libya begins with primary education, which is both free and compulsory. Children in Libya between the ages of 6 and 15 attend primary school and then attend secondary school for three additional years (15- to 18-year-olds). About 60 percent of students are assigned to a vocational secondary program, while the remaining 40 percent are assigned to a more academic-focused secondary program, based on test scores and interests. Under Gaddafi, primary and secondary education focused on his treatise on political philosophy, the Green Book, with older students studying "Jamahiriya studies".

== Brief overview ==
About 766,807 students in 2000 attended primary school and had 97,334 teachers; approximately 717,000 students were enrolled in secondary, technical, and vocational schools; and about 287,172 students were enrolled in Libya's universities.

In 2001 public expenditures on education amounted to about 2.7 percent of the gross domestic product (GDP). Although no figures were found for government expenditures on education, Libyan television announced on September 1, 2004, that a new ministry for education had been formed, the General People's Committee for Higher Education. As of 2005, the quality of the education system in Libya has been ranked 110 out of 111 countries.

In the early 1980s, estimates of total literacy were between 50 and 60 percent, or about 70 percent for men and 35 percent for women, but the gender gap has since narrowed, especially because of increased female school attendance. For 2001 the United Nations Development Programme's Human Development Report estimates that the adult literacy rate climbed to about 80.8 percent, or 91.3 percent for males and 69.3 percent for females. According to 2004 U.S. government estimates, 82 percent of the total adult population (age 15 and older) is literate, or 92 percent of males and 72 percent of females. The United Nations Development Programme recorded about an 89.9 percent adult literacy rate in 2014, while UNICEF estimated that as high 99.9 percent literacy rates among youths ages 15 to 24 for both sexes in 2012.

== History ==
=== The Kingdom of Libya (1951–1969) ===
Despite the poor economic situation in the 1950s, the Kingdom of Libya decreed the creation of its first modern university, the University of Libya in Benghazi, on December 15, 1955. The "Al-Manar" palace was assigned to be the first campus of the University. The university originally hired faculty from outside of Libya, and relied on the Egyptian government to pay the many staff members' salaries for the first four years.

The Kingdom of Libya founded many new institutions and revived many old ones. These institutions included koranic schools and were largely religious in nature.

=== Gaddafi Regime (1969–2011) ===
Education during Muammar Gaddafi's rule in Libya was defined by his treatise on political philosophy, known as the Green Book and belief in an eventual decentralization of various government institutions. The book was a central part of the Libyan curriculum for primary and secondary education under his regime. Students from ages 9 to 18 were required to study Gaddafi's government in classes referred to as "Jamahiriya studies". Jamahiriya covered various aspects of Libya's government, either taken directly from the Green Book or compiled from the Green Book into various companion texts. British author George Tremlett reported that students would study the Green Book for two hours each week in 1993. Other subjects also integrated these political philosophies, such as Geography texts denying current national borders to promote pan-arabist beliefs. In order to enforce these views, all curriculum designers were required to be part of the lijan thawriya, local committees dedicated to the interpretation of the Green Book.

Starting in 1972, the number of teacher training schools increased as well as enrollment in vocational schools. There was a large increase in students pursuing post-secondary education in both universities and in the technical and vocational sector. In 1975, there were only two universities and around 13,418 students enrolled in post-secondary education. By 2004, there were nine universities and 84 technical and vocational schools with over 270,000 post-secondary students.

By the 1980s, Libya's government realized it could not meet the demands for skilled workers and post-secondary educators, and began reforms to help meet these demands. In 1988, then secretary of education Maatouq M. Maatouq helped establish the Ministry of Technical and Vocational training, which oversaw trade schools and secondary-level vocational programs. That year, Gaddafi also asked Dr. Saleh Ibrahim to create Libya's first postgraduate school, which by 2004 had trained 80 percent of Libya's post-secondary teaching staff.

=== Post-Gaddafi Era (2011–present) ===
The Libyan Civil War in 2011 resulted in a delay to the start of the next year's classes on all levels which drew criticism for the National Transitional Council. It also drew attention several faults in the education system under Gaddafi. According to the Tripoli Post, students at the University of Tripoli felt that the Gaddafi regime had provided them with low quality education.

Following the 2011 civil war, the new education ministry began efforts to rewrite curricula. New curricula and texts began implementation in January 2012. Under the interim regime, efforts have been made to remove Gaddafi's influence from all levels education until it can be addressed appropriately. Acting education minister Suliman El-Sahli stated the ministry hopes "All historical eras will be presented objectively, without propaganda".

Under the Gaddafi regime, vocational education was tailored largely for domestic, public sector jobs. Efforts to shift focus in vocational towards private sector jobs and improved international relations became an important issue for the new government in Libya. In 2013, the Libyan Board for Technical and Vocational Education signed a memorandum of understanding with UK based TVET UK in order to facilitate efforts to modernize the institutions established in the 1970s and 1980s and overhaul vocational education in Libya. TVET UK agreed to work with UK based suppliers to set up workshops in Libya to prepare the transition of skilled works into new private sector industries. In May 2013, the General National Congress began a funding initiative to send students to study overseas. The program had chosen 2,004 educators with master's degrees and 5,692 students to complete their education abroad at its inception, with plans to send another 3,616 top students over the coming years and to provide another 31,000 students with English language training. Initially, the fund gave scholarships to students who fought in militias during the civil war, but was later expanded to allow women and handicapped students to receive scholarships as well.

The Ministry of Technical and Vocational Education was established to support development of the technical education and vocational training sector in the country.
