= Jabal al Akhdar =

District of Libya

Coordinates: 30.7667°N 21.7333°E

Jabal al Akhdar الجبل الأخضر
- District
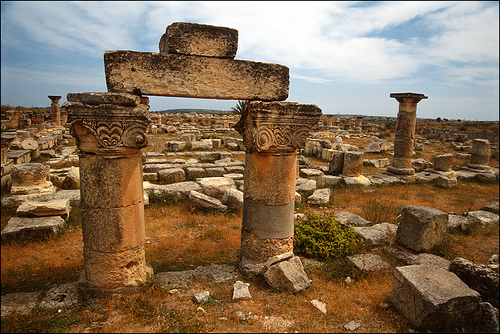
- Asclepium Balagrae

- Map of Libya with Jabal al Akhdar district highlighted
- Country: Libya
- Capital: Bayda

Area
  - Total: 7,800 km^{2} (3,000 sq mi)

Population (2006)
  - Total: 206,180
  - Density: 26/km^{2} (68/sq mi)
- License Plate Code: 2, 35, 45

Jabal al Akhdar or The Green Mountain (Arabic: الجبل الأخضر al-Jabal al-Akhḍar) is one of the districts of Libya. It lies in the northeast of the country. The capital is Bayda. In its territory, close to the city of Shahhat, can be found the remains of the ancient Greek colony of Cyrene, and the neighbouring city of Apollonia, a major port in the Mediterranean Sea in antiquity. On land, it borders Derna in the east, Al Wahat in the south and Marj in the west.

Per the census of 2012, the total population in was 157,747, with 150,353 Libyans. Average household size was 6.9, compared to 3.7 for non-Libyans. There were a total of 22,713 households, 20,907 of them Libyan. The population density was 1.86 persons per km^{2}. Per the 2006 census, there were 70,321 economically active people.

== Demographics ==
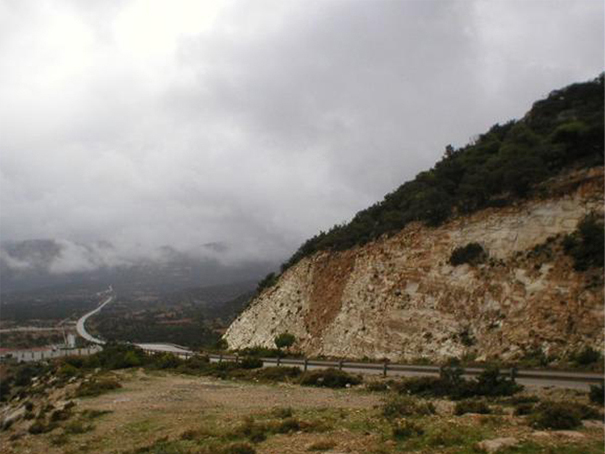
Road in the district

There were 44,972 government employees, 6,436 employers, 26,710 first level workers and 069 second level workers. There were 18,290 workers in state administration, 2,749 in agriculture, animal husbandry and forestry, 3,148 in agriculture & hunting, 22,772 in education, 4,954 in private enterprises, 3,319 in health & social work, 4,465 in production, 22,846 in technical work and 1,341 service workers. The total enrollment in schools was 71,229 and the number of people above secondary stage and less than graduation was 3,628. As per the report from World Health Organization (WHO), there were two communicable disease centres, seven dental clinics, three general clinics, no inpatient clinics, 16 outpatient clinics, 55 pharmacies, 157 PHC centres, one polyclinics, six rural clinics and no specialized clinics. Islam is the state and major religion of the country.

== Geography ==
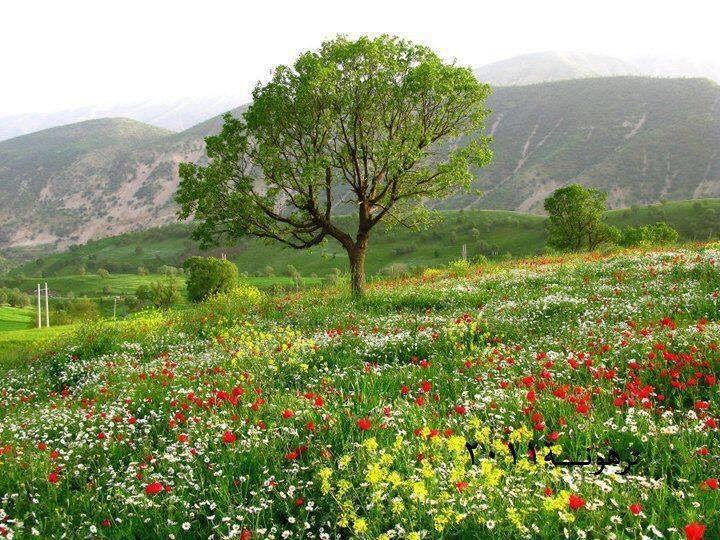
Nature in Ras Elhelal

In its southern part is the fertile upland area of Jebel Akhdar. North of this is a dry, sub-desert area between the uplands and the Mediterranean on its northern edge. Libya has mostly a flat undulating plain and occasional plateau, with an average elevation of around 423 m (1,388 ft). Around 91 per cent of the land is covered by desert, with only 8.8 per cent agricultural land (with only 1% arable lands) and 0.1 per cent of forests. The major resources are petroleum, gypsum and natural gas. Along the coastal regions, the climate is Mediterranean in coastal areas, while it is desert climate in all other parts. Dust storms lasting four to eight days is pretty common during spring. Triplotania is the northwest region, while it is Cyrenacia in the east and Fezzen in the southwest. Cyrenacia is the largest region in Libya, which is mostly semi arid in nature. The region receives an annual rainfall of 5 in (130 mm). There are no perennial rivers in the region, but the region is abundant with groundwater aquifers.

== Administration ==
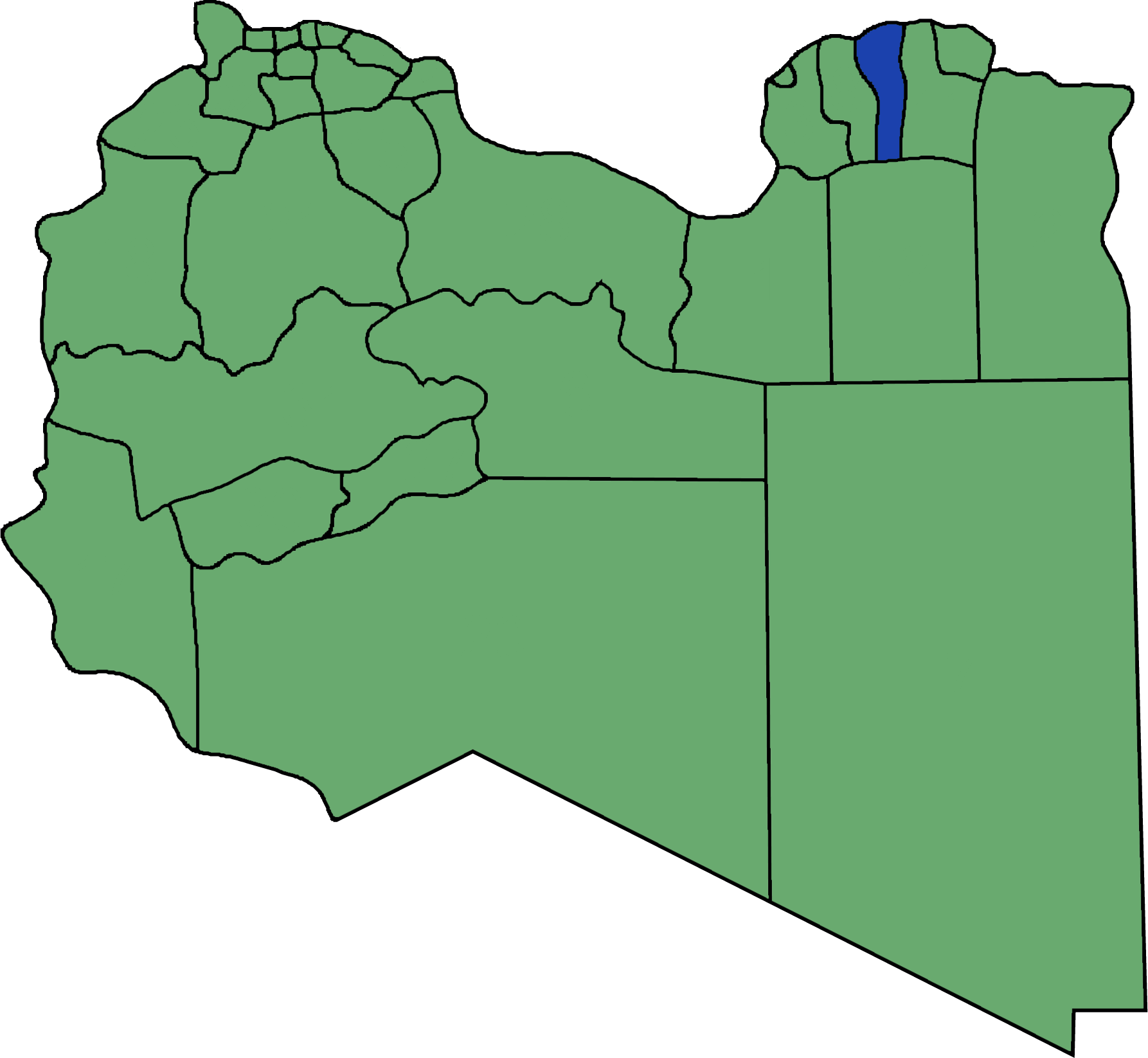
The same district between 2001 and 2007

Libya became independent in 1951 from the colonial empire and generally known for its oil-rich resources. All the powers rested centrally with the Brotherly Leader Gaddafi, for 42 years till the 2011 armed rebellion which topple him. As per the constitution, Libya is the most decentralized Arab nation, but practically all powers are vested on central government on account of control over the oil revenues. Local governmental institutions manage the administration of education, industry, and communities. As a part of decentralization in 2012, the country is administratively split into 13 regions from the original 25 municipalities, which were further divided in 1,500 communes. Since 2015, the chief of the state is a chairman of Presidential Council, while the prime minister is the head of the state. The House of Representatives is an elected body that is elected on universal suffrage and popular vote. As of 2016, there were 22 administrative divisions in the country in the form of districts.

== See also ==
- Bayda Governorate
