= Bayda, Libya =

Bayda البيضاء Elbeida
- City
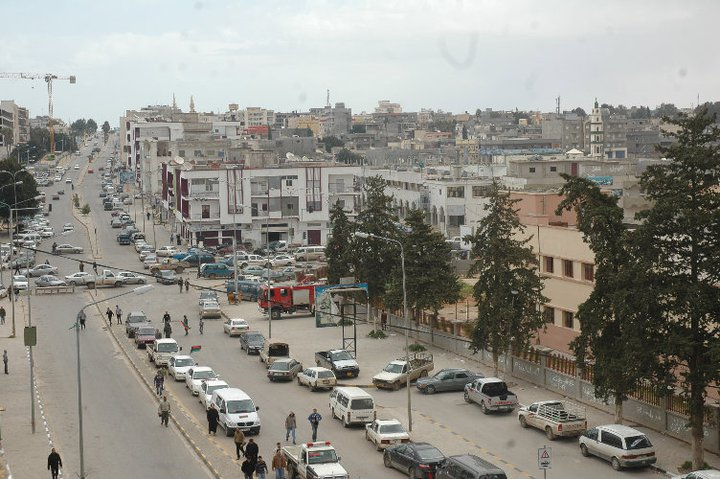
- Al Akhdar, Bayda

- Location in Libya
- Coordinates: 32°45′59″N 21°44′30″E
- Country: Libya
- Region: Cyrenaica
- District: Jabal al Akhdar
- Settled: Balagrae: c. early 1st millennium BCE; az-Zāwiyat al-Bayḍāʾ: 1840; Beda Littoria: 1933; Bayda/Elbeida: 1950s
- Elevation: 623 m (2,044 ft)

Population (2010)
  - Total: 380,000
- Time zone: UTC+2 (EET)
- License Plate Code: 2

Bayda (Note: /ˈbaɪdə/ BY-də or /ˈbeɪdə/ BAY-də; also spelt Beida.) or Elbeida (Note: Also spelt El Beida.) (Arabic: البيضاء, romanized: al-Bayḍāʾ, pronounced [al.bajˈdˤaːʔ]), known as Beda Littoria under Italian colonial rule, is a commercial and industrial city in northern Cyrenaica, eastern Libya. With a population of 250,000 people, Bayda is the 4th-largest city in Libya after Tripoli, Benghazi and Misrata. It is the capital city of the Jabal al Akhdar district.

== Name and history ==
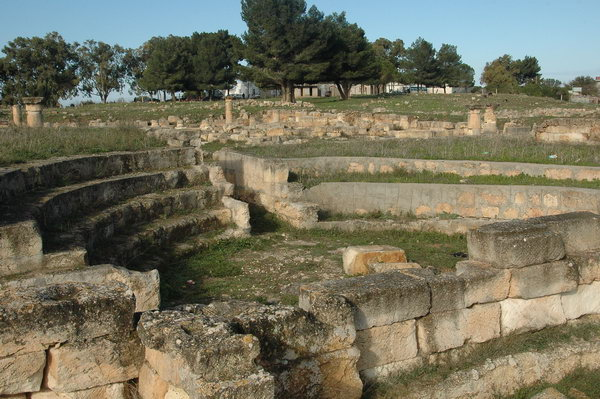
The ruins of the ancient Greek city of Balagrae in Bayda.

Bayda's history stretches back to classical antiquity, when it was known as Balagrae. The 2,000-year-old ruins of the ancient Greek colony of Cyrene are located nearby in Shahat.

One of the greatest attractions in the city is the tomb of a famous companion (sahabah) of the Islamic prophet Muhammad, Ruwaifi bin Thabit al-Ansari. For that reason, the city was known as Sidi Rafaa after him. After the arrival of Muhammad ibn Ali as-Senussi in the area in the 19th century, and the construction of a white-painted zāwiyah (located on top of a high hill and clearly visible from a distance), the city was renamed az-Zāwiyat al-Bayḍāʾ (الزاوية البيضاء, "the White Monastery"). Over time, the word zāwiyah was dropped and the city became known simply as (al-)Bayḍāʾ. The Senussi movement had dedicated zāwiyahs in the town to educate local people in fiqh, Quranic memorisation to the young, as well as local and tribal conflict resolution, as was customary at the time. The zāwiyah still exists, but it is in a neglected state and sits near Omar Al-Mukhtar University at the western entrance to the city.

During Fascist Italian rule, the city was known as Beda Littoria, after the fascio littorio, the main fascist symbol. The modern city, which dropped the fascist name under the Kingdom of Libya, was built in the 1950s. It was originally intended to be the new capital of Libya and most of the necessary government buildings were constructed there. Eventually, the plan to move the capital from Tripoli to Bayḍāʾ was abandoned.

During the First Libyan Civil War, the city was the first to fall to anti-Gaddafi forces, on 17 February 2011, after the Battle of Bayda.

== Geography ==
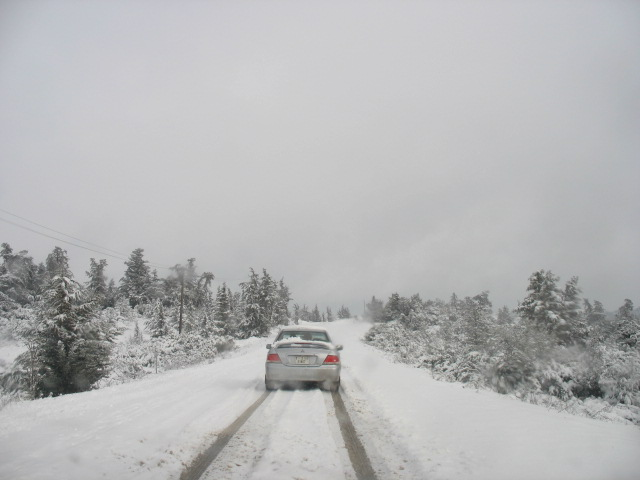
A snowy road on the outskirts of the city

The city is famous for the valleys and forests nearby, which are not found in the other cities of the 'Green Mountains'—Akhdar Mountains. It is named the "Green Mountains" because they are covered by dense forests and woodlands, of which the best known are the Hamri, Alpellnj, and Belaid forests. The highest point in the Akhdar Mountains is around 850 metres (2,790 ft), located in the Hamri area.

=== Native habitat ===
The Akhdar mountain range lies within the Mediterranean dry woodlands and steppe ecoregion. The region has many native plants closely related to those found in similar Greek, Italian, and Spanish coastal mountains and forests. There are about 1,800 species of Mediterranean forests, woodlands, and scrub trees, plants, and flowers. The forests are characterized by many species of oak, juniper, pine, carob, cypress, hawthorn, Luffa aegyptiaca, and olives. There is a network of natural springs in most parts of the mountains, which makes them one of the most fertile areas of coastal Maghreb. The forested areas and springs provide habitat supportive of a diversity of birds and wildlife.

The Akhdar Mountains are part of the larger Jabal al Akhdar Plateau, an area of 15,000 square kilometres (5,800 sq mi), with a length of 200 km (120 mi) from the Albakur in the west to the Valley of Bef to the east of Derna, and a width of 75 km (47 mi). Beaches stretch along the chain for about 350 kilometres (220 mi), in a diverse terrain with many coastal bays and inlets. Bayda is famous for the neighboring locale of Susa, a seaside resort on the Mediterranean Sea.

=== Agriculture ===
Cultivated plants include many fruit trees, including apples, grapes, nuts, and other fruits estimated at four million trees, as well as many medicinal and herbal plants, such as thyme, wandering herb Alkhalap, and rosemary. In the past the mountains probably also had the Silphium plant, which was treasured in antiquity but is now believed to be extinct. Honey is also found in this region, due to the abundance of herbs. Bozharh is a center for the production of honey, for which Jabal al Akhdar is famous. The finest honey comes from bees which feed on the thyme and lotus plants. Honey is also extracted from the chammari or strawberry plant, Arbutus unedo, which blooms in the months of December and January. Honey-murr from the cove region has proved to be useful for the treatment of liver diseases, such as diabetes.

=== Climate ===
The city of Bayda has a mild Mediterranean climate (Csb, according to the Köppen climate classification) with an average annual precipitation of 540 millimetres or 21 inches. It is famous for recurring snow falls and heavy rains, where the temperature rises in the summer time to 30 °C (86 °F), but in the winter snow and freezing temperatures can occur. The city is in a Mediterranean-Berber/Arab area about 241 kilometres (150 mi) south of Crete, and is referred to as the City of Snow, which distinguishes it from the rest of the cities of Libya. The altitude added to the northern location sustains the nival precipitation (even if hardly accumulates), different from other nearby coastal areas. The region of Jabal al-Akhda is characterized by a moderate climate, being cooler in the winter with an average annual rainfall of about 540 millimetres or 21 inches.

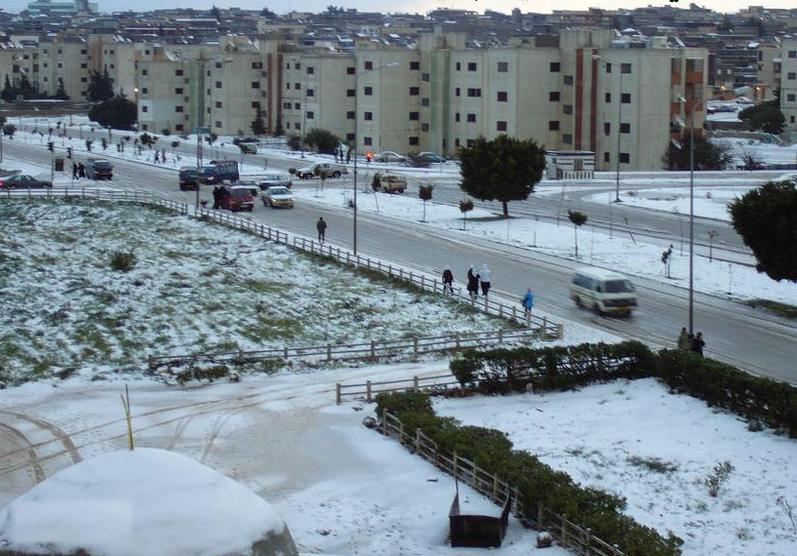
New Bayda neighborhood

Climate data for Bayda
Month	Jan	Feb	Mar	Apr	May	Jun	Jul	Aug	Sep	Oct	Nov	Dec	Year
Mean daily maximum °C (°F)	11.8 (53.2)	12.9 (55.2)	15.6 (60.1)	19.6 (67.3)	23.4 (74.1)	27.2 (81.0)	26.9 (80.4)	26.7 (80.1)	25.5 (77.9)	23.7 (74.7)	19.0 (66.2)	14.5 (58.1)	20.6 (69.0)
Daily mean °C (°F)	7.9 (46.2)	8.4 (47.1)	10.6 (51.1)	13.7 (56.7)	17.1 (62.8)	20.6 (69.1)	21.4 (70.5)	21.4 (70.5)	20.0 (68.0)	18.1 (64.6)	14.2 (57.6)	10.3 (50.5)	15.3 (59.6)
Mean daily minimum °C (°F)	4.0 (39.2)	4.0 (39.2)	5.6 (42.1)	7.8 (46.0)	10.8 (51.4)	14.0 (57.2)	16.0 (60.8)	16.1 (61.0)	14.5 (58.1)	12.6 (54.7)	9.0 (48.2)	5.1 (41.2)	10.0 (49.9)
Average precipitation mm (inches)	121 (4.8)	105 (4.1)	58 (2.3)	25 (1.0)	9 (0.4)	2 (0.1)	0 (0)	0 (0)	6 (0.2)	38 (1.5)	55 (2.2)	121 (4.8)	540 (21.4)
Source: Climate-data.org

== Economy ==
Bayda is one of the major cities in eastern Libya, and one of its major economic centers. It is also the industrial and commercial center in Libya. The major manufactured goods include food products, fertilizers and agricultural products, food processing, and imported goods, and produce from villages near the city in the Akhdar region, including cereals, dates, olives, wool, and meat. Bayda also has one of the most important markets of vegetables and fruits in Libya, because of the naturally fertile lands.

Financing is also important, and the city's National Commercial Bank is the second largest bank in Libya. It also has a number of other large banks, including the Office of the Central Bank of Libya in the city center. There is also the Agricultural Research Centre and the main animal and large national firms, such as Brega Oil Marketing Company and Gulf Oil, are important to the city's economy. Coupled with an increase in consumer prices, is an increase in the importance of the retail sector in the economy of the city. In recent years, international companies such as United Colors of Benetton, H & M, and Nike, have opened in Bayda.

=== Tourism ===
Tourism as an industry is still in the very early stages in Libya. Bayda is an important tourist city in Libya, a base to explore the nearby tourist areas such as the Ancient Greece ruins of Cyrene and Apollonia, and Libyan Desert trips south into Kufra. The village Balagrae contains several large hotels, due to the tourist population.

== Demographics ==
As with other cities in Libya, there is a reasonable amount of ethnic diversity in Bayda. The people of eastern Libya, Bayda included, have in recent centuries been of predominantly Arab descent. The earliest inhabitants were Berber peoples, and from the 7th century BCE until the 7th century CE, the main ethnic group was Greek. In recent times, there has been an influx of African immigrants into Bayda. The city also hosts many Egyptian immigrants. A small Greek community is also present. The Greek island of Crete is a short distance from Bayda, and many modern families in the city bear Cretan surnames.

The majority of Libyans in Bayda are of Arab, Berber and Greek descendants century, historically controlled a section of Libya. Bayda and its surrounding areas were controlled by the Barasa clan. In modern times, a large number of Libyans from different parts of the country have moved into the city.

=== Education ===
Education in Bayda, as is the case throughout Libya, is compulsory and free. Compulsory education continues up until ninth grade. There are many public primary and secondary schools throughout the city, as well as some private and international school and others. Omar Al-Mukhtar University education is also free for all Libyan citizens in Bayda. It holds the country's second largest university, the former Al-Jami'a al-Libiya.

Omar Al-Mukhtar University is the second university established in the country, and the first Islamic university, but after the Revolution of 1960, it was changed to the University of Agriculture, and then to a regular university. It now includes 14 colleges in several cities, such as Tobruq and Derna, Libya.

=== Religion ===
The predominant religion in Bayda is Islam. Almost all of the city's inhabitants are Sunni Muslim. During Muslim holidays such as Ramadan, most abstain from food; restaurants are usually empty during the day, with the exception of some expatriates and tourists. Alcohol is banned by law in Bayda and throughout Libya in accordance with Islamic principles. The conservative Islamic nature of Bayda creates a strong sense of family life in the city: almost all teenagers and young adults live at home until they marry. Many in Bayda adhere to the traditional Maliki school of Islamic jurisprudence. In recent years however, some people are beginning to practice schools of thought popular in Saudi Arabia such as Salafism, with an increase in the number of literalist-inclined Islamic television channels. It is not uncommon, therefore, to see women wearing black niqabs and men with full beards.

There are many mosques throughout the city; the oldest and best known is the Mosque Ruwayfi bin Thabit Al-Ansari; the oldest mosques are located in and around the medina. There is also a small foreign Christian community in the city: the Franciscan-run Maria Immacolata Parish Church serves Bayda's Catholic community of roughly 4000, as well as a Protestant church belonging to the Church of Christ.

=== Sports ===
Bayda has some of the best sports facilities in the country. The city has various sporting centres of different standards, such as football stadiums, as well as several other public and private facilities. Football is the most popular sport in Bayda, and one of the country's most successful football clubs, Alakhdhar, is based in the city.

The largest sporting centre in Bayda is the Medina al-Riyadhia (Sports City). The complex is situated just north of the city centre, and houses the Al Bayda Stadium and athletics stadium, and the Slayman al Tharrat basketball stadium. Several matches of the 2009 FIBA Africa Championship were hosted at the arena.

Judo and taekwondo are popular men's sports in Bayda. In recent times, rugby sevens has seen great success, with three clubs to its name. Gyms have also become more popular in the city in recent years, because of a greater concern for healthy living amongst Libyans.

== Transportation ==
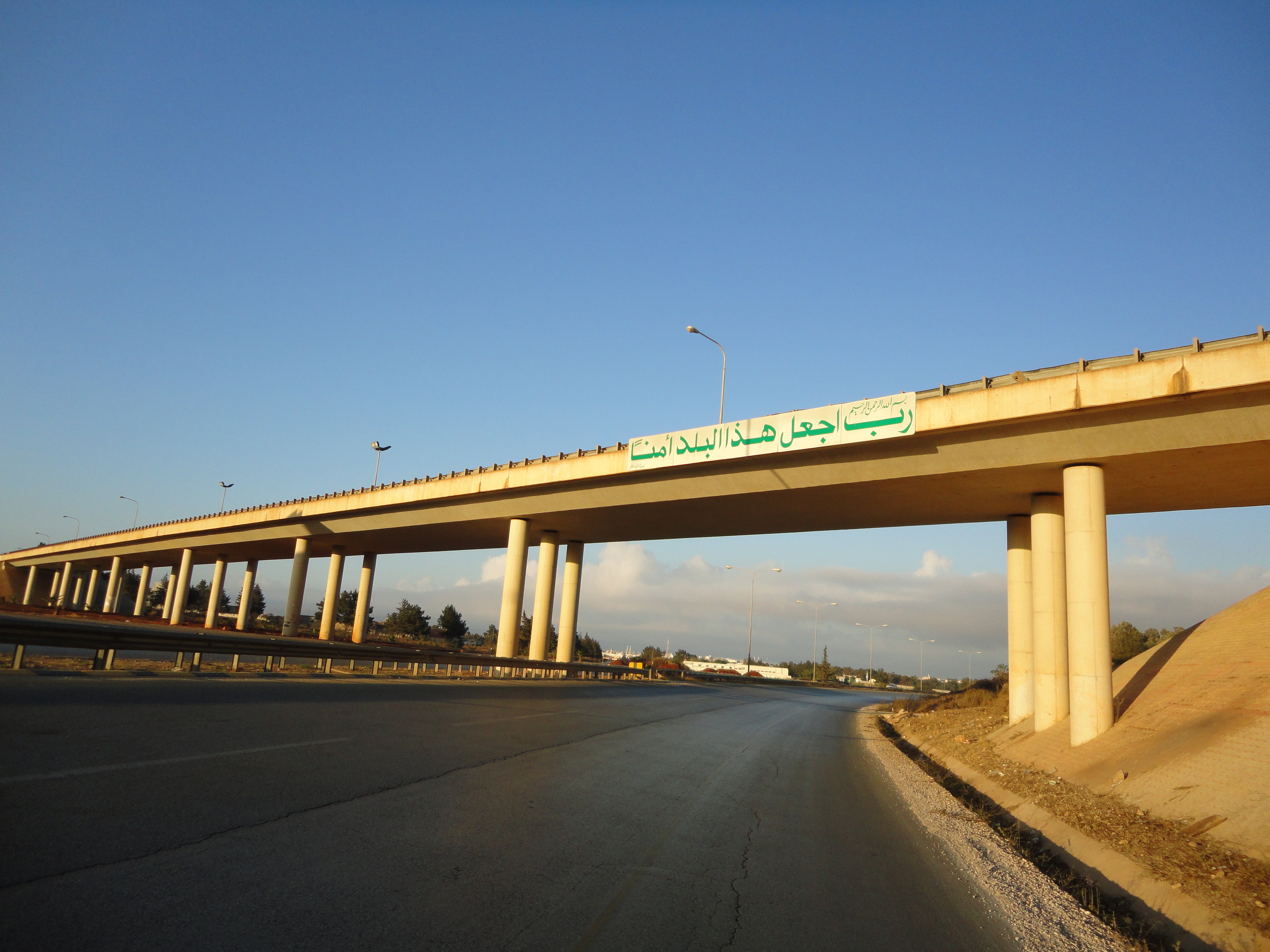
Libyan Coastal Highway with bridge overpass, to the east of Bayda

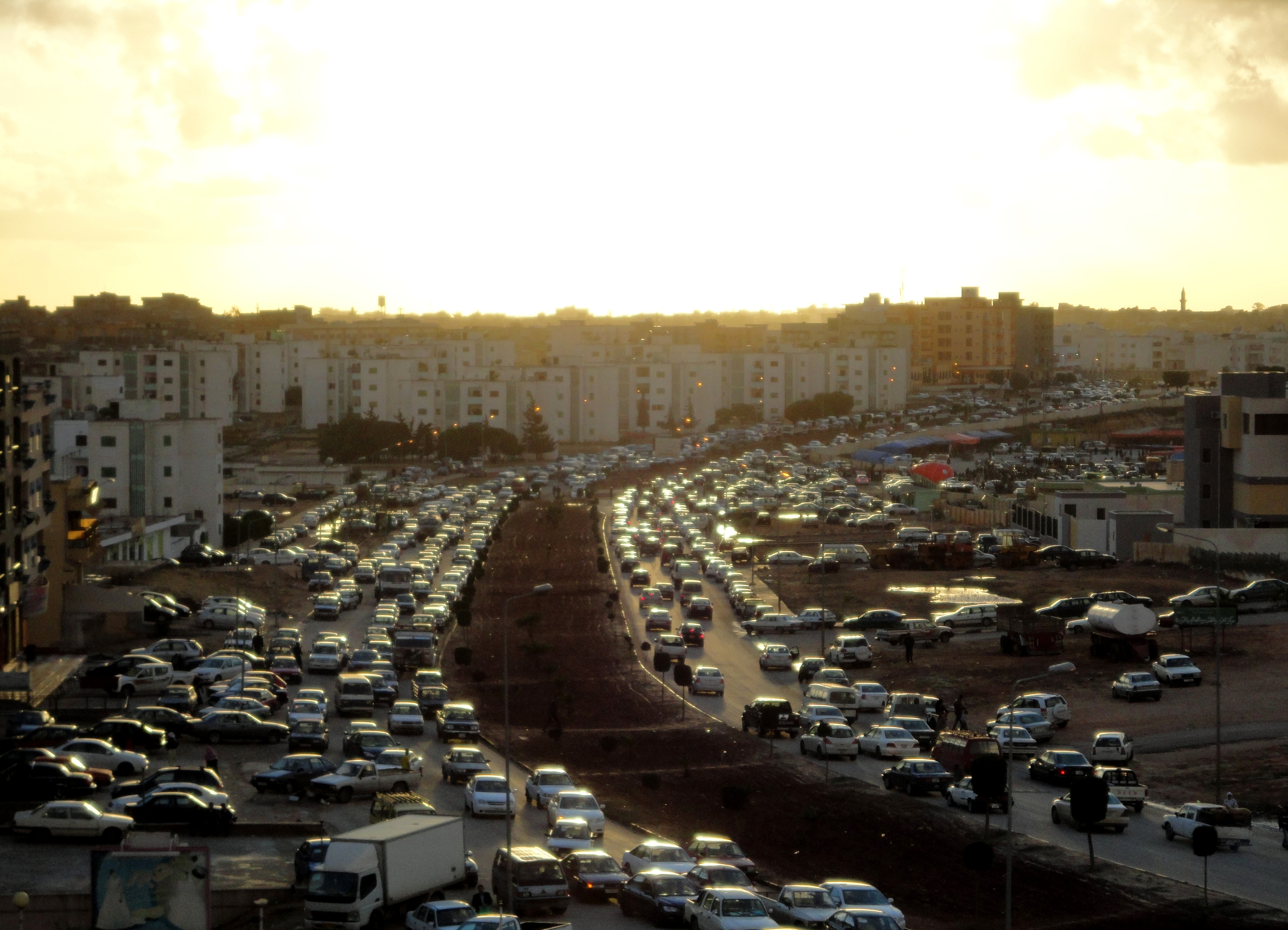
Traffic congestion in Bayda

=== Road network ===
Bayda is on the historic Libyan Coastal Highway. The local road network is generally well designed. An efficient system of highways, flyovers, ringroads and underpasses serve the city, and allow for the transport of goods and vehicles. The roads are not always well-maintained however, and often have incorrect, poorly visible or no road markings, as well as potholes in some roads and inner city streets. In recent years, a rapid increase in car ownership has meant that traffic jams, lack of parking spaces and overcrowding are also common, especially on smaller streets. Road accidents are also on the rise because of the increase in vehicles and the subsequent lax attention given by authorities to dangerous driving.

=== Public transit ===
There is no systematic public transport system in Bayda, despite the city's size and significance. A popular system of microbuses has developed in recent years and covers many areas of the city, they run on fixed routes and passengers embark and disembark anywhere on the route. There are also international services to Cairo and Alexandria.

==== Railway ====
As of 2010, earthworks are underway in the city for a rail network which will traverse northern Libya. Russian Railways is responsible for the three-year contract. In the future, a rail link may be built to both Tunisia and Egypt, forming a North African coastal rail network.

==== Airports ====
The Al Abraq International Airport serves domestic and international flights.

== Notable people ==
- Mabrouka al-Tabiba, widely-known midwife

== Twin towns and sister cities ==
Bayda is twinned with:

- Carinthia, Austria
- İzmit, Turkey
