= Japan–Oceania relations =

International relation

- Japan: Oceania

Japan

Oceania

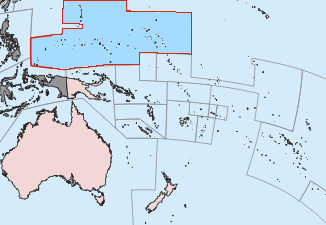
The former South Seas Mandate

Japan–Oceania relations refers to relations between Japan and the countries of Oceania.

Japan's relations with Oceania developed through strategic interests since the end of the 19th century.

Following the COVID-19 pandemic, Japan, having shifted its approach regarding security issues in Oceania, increased its involvement in the region's regional security programme.

Japan significantly increased its involvement in the region due to China expanding its presence "in terms of investment, assistance, and infrastructure projects".

== Japan's foreign relations with Oceanian countries ==
- Australia–Japan relations
- Fiji–Japan relations
- Japan–Kiribati relations
- Japan–Marshall Islands relations
- Japan–Federated States of Micronesia relations
- Japan–Nauru relations
- Japan–New Zealand relations
- Japan–Palau relations
- Japan–Papua New Guinea relations
- Japan–Samoa relations
- Japan–Solomon Islands relations
- Japan–Tonga relations
- Japan–Tuvalu relations
- Japan–Vanuatu relations

== See also ==
- Pacific Alliance Leaders Meeting
- Oceania
- South Seas Mandate (1919–1945)
- China-Pacific relations
