= Foreign relations of Japan =

Results of 2017 BBC World Service poll Views of Japan's influence by country (sorted by pos − neg)
Country polled	Positive	Negative	Neutral	Pos − Neg
China	22%	75%	3	-53
Spain	39%	36%	25	3
Turkey	50%	32%	18	18
Pakistan	38%	20%	42	18
India	45%	17%	38	28
Russia	45%	16%	39	29
Peru	56%	25%	19	31
Nigeria	57%	24%	19	33
United Kingdom	65%	30%	5	35
Mexico	59%	23%	18	36
Kenya	58%	22%	20	36
Germany	50%	13%	37	37
Indonesia	57%	17%	26	40
United States	65%	23%	12	42
France	74%	21%	5	53
Brazil	70%	15%	15	55
Australia	78%	17%	5	61
Canada	77%	12%	11	65

The foreign relations of Japan (日本の国際関係, Nihon no kokusai kankei) are handled by Japanese Ministry of Foreign Affairs.

Japan maintains diplomatic relations with every United Nations member nations except for North Korea, in addition to UN observer states Holy See, as well as Kosovo, Cook Islands, and Niue.

In 19th century, Japanese foreign relations had an earliest beginnings in 5th century and after their opening to the world in 1854 with the Convention of Kanagawa. Japan had rapidly modernized and built a strong military. In early 20th century, Japan was imperialistic seeking control of nearby areas—with major wars against China and Russia. It gained control parts of China including Manchuria, Korea, Taiwan, Okinawa, and as well as Southeast Asia and Pacific islands. Empire of Japan has lost in World War II to then-American President Harry S. Truman and allies, and was stripped of all of its foreign conquests and possessions. (See History of Japanese foreign relations). American General Douglas MacArthur, acting for Allied powers, supervised occupied Japan between 1945 and 1951. Since the occupation ended diplomatic policy, Japan has been based on close partnership with the United States of America after Truman left from office and seeking trade agreements. In the Cold War (1947–1991), Japan was demilitarized, but it allied with America, Mexico, Canada, Britain, Australia, New Zealand, and among other allied countries in the confrontation with the Soviet Union. It played a major support role in Korean War (1950–1953). In a rapid economic developments in between early 1960s and 1980s, Japan was one of the major greatest economic powers in the world.

Since the death of Emperor Hirohito in January 1989, by early 1990s, Japan became more active assertive, moving from a passive, reactive posture to one of greater international engagement, especially participated in peacekeeping operations by the United Nations, and sent troops to Cambodia, Mozambique, Golan Heights, and East Timor.

In the beginning of 21st century, in early 2001, Japan had focused on maintaining its core relationship with America, especially response to the war on terror, and participating in regional diplomacy, which included supporting stabilization efforts in Afghanistan. Despite the war on terror after 9/11 terror attacks hit America in September 2001, Japanese Ground Self-Defense Force also dispatched their troops to Southern Iraq for the restoration of basic infrastructures. Also, Japanese maritime naval vessels have been assigned to resupply duties in Indian Ocean to the present date.

== Foreign policy ==
Beyond its immediate neighbors, Japan has pursued a more active foreign policy in recent years, recognizing the responsibility which accompanies its economic strength. Japanese Prime Minister Yasuo Fukuda stressed a changing direction in a policy speech to the National Diet: "Japan aspires to become a hub of human resource development as well as for research and intellectual contribution to further promote cooperation in the field of peace-building." This follows the modest success of a Japanese-conceived peace plan which became the foundation for nationwide elections in Cambodia in 1998.

== History ==
=== Links ===
- Foreign relations of Meiji Japan
- International relations of the Great Powers (1814–1919)
- Diplomatic history of World War I
- International relations (1919–1939)
- Causes of World War II
- Diplomatic history of World War II
- Cold War
  - History of Sino-Japanese relations, China
  - France–Japan relations
  - Germany–Japan relations
  - Greater East Asia Co-Prosperity Sphere, 1930–1945
  - History of Japan–Korea relations
    - Japan–North Korea relations
    - Japan–South Korea relations
  - Japanese foreign policy on Southeast Asia
  - Japan–Russia relations
    - Japan–Soviet Union relations
  - Japan–United Kingdom relations
  - Japan–United States relations

== Diplomatic relations ==
List of countries which Japan maintains diplomatic relations with:

#	Country	Date
1	Russia	7 February 1855
2	Netherlands	30 January 1856
3	United States	29 July 1858
4	United Kingdom	26 August 1858
5	France	9 October 1858
6	Portugal	3 August 1860
7	Switzerland	6 February 1864
8	Belgium	1 August 1866
9	Italy	25 August 1866
10	Denmark	1 January 1867
11	Sweden	11 January 1868
12	Spain	12 November 1868
13	Peru	21 August 1873
14	Serbia	15 June 1882
15	Thailand	26 September 1887
16	Mexico	30 November 1888
17	Brazil	5 November 1895
18	Chile	25 September 1897
19	Argentina	3 February 1898
20	Greece	1 June 1899
21	Romania	18 June 1902
22	Panama	7 January 1904
23	Norway	7 November 1905
24	Colombia	25 May 1908
25	Bolivia	13 April 1914
26	Ecuador	26 August 1918
27	Poland	22 March 1919
28	Finland	24 May 1919
29	Paraguay	17 November 1919
30	Czech Republic	12 January 1920
31	Austria	16 December 1920
32	Hungary	9 February 1921
33	Uruguay	24 September 1921
34	Albania	18 April 1922
35	Turkey	6 August 1924
36	Luxembourg	27 November 1927
37	Canada	31 January 1928
38	Iran	4 August 1929
39	Cuba	21 December 1929
40	Ethiopia	18 November 1930
41	Afghanistan	26 July 1931
42	Dominican Republic	November 1934
43	El Salvador	15 February 1935
44	Costa Rica	20 February 1935
45	Guatemala	20 February 1935
46	Honduras	20 February 1935
47	Nicaragua	20 February 1935
48	Venezuela	19 August 1938
49	Iraq	10 March 1939
50	Bulgaria	2 October 1939
51	Australia	17 August 1940
—	Holy See	4 May 1942
52	Germany	19 April 1952
53	India	28 April 1952
54	New Zealand	28 April 1952
55	Pakistan	28 April 1952
56	Sri Lanka	28 April 1952
57	Israel	15 May 1952
58	Syria	December 1953
59	Cambodia	4 May 1954
60	Jordan	14 July 1954
61	Egypt	23 August 1954
62	Lebanon	November 1954
63	Myanmar	1 December 1954
64	Laos	5 March 1955
65	Saudi Arabia	7 June 1955
66	Sudan	6 January 1956
67	Haiti	23 April 1956
68	Morocco	19 June 1956
69	Tunisia	26 June 1956
70	Philippines	23 July 1956
71	Nepal	1 September 1956
72	Iceland	8 December 1956
73	Ireland	5 March 1957
74	Ghana	6 March 1957
75	Libya	2 June 1957
76	Malaysia	31 August 1957
77	Indonesia	15 April 1958
78	Guinea	14 November 1958
79	Cameroon	1 January 1960
80	Democratic Republic of the Congo	30 June 1960
81	Madagascar	5 July 1960
82	Republic of the Congo	1 August 1960
83	Central African Republic	13 August 1960
84	Gabon	17 August 1960
85	Nigeria	1 October 1960
86	Senegal	4 October 1960
87	Mauritania	29 November 1960
88	Togo	4 April 1961
89	Ivory Coast	15 April 1961
90	Sierra Leone	27 April 1961
91	Benin	April 1961
92	Liberia	September 1961
93	Chad	6 December 1961
94	Somalia	6 December 1961
95	Kuwait	8 December 1961
96	Tanzania	9 December 1961
97	Mali	18 January 1962
98	Niger	18 March 1962
99	Burkina Faso	1 June 1962
100	Cyprus	15 June 1962
101	Burundi	1 July 1962
102	Rwanda	1 July 1962
103	Algeria	28 November 1962
104	Jamaica	16 March 1964
105	Uganda	1 April 1964
106	Trinidad and Tobago	22 May 1964
107	Kenya	1 June 1964
108	Malawi	July 1964
109	Zambia	29 October 1964
110	Gambia	18 February 1965
111	Malta	15 July 1965
112	South Korea	18 December 1965
113	Singapore	26 April 1966
114	Botswana	30 September 1966
115	Guyana	11 June 1967
116	Barbados	29 August 1967
117	Maldives	14 November 1967
118	Equatorial Guinea	12 November 1968
119	Mauritius	22 October 1969
120	Tonga	July 1970
121	Yemen	22 September 1970
122	Fiji	15 October 1970
123	Eswatini	21 May 1971
124	Lesotho	29 July 1971
125	Bangladesh	10 February 1972
126	Mongolia	24 February 1972
127	Bahrain	2 May 1972
128	United Arab Emirates	4 May 1972
129	Oman	8 May 1972
130	Qatar	9 May 1972
131	China	29 September 1972
132	Nauru	December 1972
133	Samoa	27 March 1973
134	Vietnam	21 September 1973
135	Guinea-Bissau	1 August 1974
136	Bahamas	11 March 1975
137	Grenada	11 April 1975
138	Cape Verde	11 July 1975
139	São Tomé and Príncipe	22 July 1975
140	Papua New Guinea	16 September 1975
141	Seychelles	29 June 1976
142	Angola	9 September 1976
143	Suriname	2 November 1976
144	Mozambique	9 January 1977
145	Comoros	14 November 1977
146	Djibouti	24 August 1978
147	Solomon Islands	1 September 1978
148	Dominica	12 November 1978
149	Tuvalu	30 April 1979
150	Saint Lucia	11 January 1980
151	Kiribati	21 March 1980
152	Saint Vincent and the Grenadines	15 April 1980
153	Zimbabwe	5 June 1980
154	Vanuatu	8 January 1981
155	Antigua and Barbuda	4 October 1982
156	Belize	3 November 1982
157	Brunei	2 April 1984
158	Saint Kitts and Nevis	14 January 1985
159	Bhutan	28 March 1986
160	Federated States of Micronesia	5 August 1988
161	Marshall Islands	9 December 1988
162	Namibia	21 March 1990
163	Estonia	10 October 1991
164	Latvia	10 October 1991
165	Lithuania	10 October 1991
166	South Africa	13 January 1992
167	Belarus	26 January 1992
168	Kazakhstan	26 January 1992
169	Kyrgyzstan	26 January 1992
170	Ukraine	26 January 1992
171	Uzbekistan	26 January 1992
172	Tajikistan	2 February 1992
173	Moldova	16 March 1992
174	Turkmenistan	22 April 1922
175	Georgia	3 August 1992
176	Armenia	7 September 1992
177	Azerbaijan	7 September 1992
178	Slovenia	12 October 1992
179	Slovakia	3 February 1993
180	Croatia	5 March 1993
181	Eritrea	31 August 1993
182	North Macedonia	1 March 1994
183	Palau	2 November 1994
184	Andorra	20 October 1995
185	Bosnia and Herzegovina	9 February 1996
186	San Marino	27 May 1996
187	Liechtenstein	12 June 1996
188	Timor-Leste	20 May 2002
189	Montenegro	16 June 2006
190	Monaco	14 December 2006
—	Kosovo	25 February 2009
—	Cook Islands	16 June 2011
191	South Sudan	9 July 2011
—	Niue	4 August 2015

== Bilateral relations ==
=== Africa ===
Japan is increasingly active in Africa. In May 2008, the first Hideyo Noguchi Africa Prize will be awarded at Fourth Tokyo International Conference on African Development (TICAD IV), which signals a changing emphasis in bilateral relations.

Country	Formal relations began	Notes
Algeria	1962	See Algeria–Japan relations
Angola	September 1976	See Angola–Japan relations Angola–Japan relations were established in September 1976, shortly after Angola received formal sovereignty. As of 2007, economic relations played "a fundamental role in the bilateral relations between the two governments". News World Centers
Egypt	1922	See Egypt–Japan relations Japan considers Egypt to be a key player in the Middle East and, as such, sees Egypt as a vital part of its diplomacy in the region. The two heads of government have been known to support each other on issues pertaining to the peace process in the Middle East. Additionally, the two countries claim to share a common vision for world peace. The two countries maintain a "Joint Committee" dedicated to exploring developments in areas of mutual interest to the two countries.
Kenya	1963	See Japan–Kenya relations: Japan has an embassy in Nairobi.; Kenya has an embassy in Tokyo.
Libya	1957	See Japan–Libya relations: Japan has an embassy in Tripoli.; Libya has an embassy in Tokyo.
Madagascar	5 July 1960	See Foreign relations of Madagascar: Japan has an embassy in Antananarivo.; Madagascar has an embassy in Tokyo.
Mozambique	January 1977	See Japan–Mozambique relations: Japan has an embassy in Maputo.; Mozambique has an embassy in Tokyo.
Nigeria	1 October 1960	See Japan-Nigeria relations Japan and Nigeria engage in strong economic and political cooperation. Both countries established diplomatic relations on 1 October 1960.
Somalia	July 1960	See Japan–Somalia relations
South Africa	1910	See Japan–South Africa relations: Japan has an embassy in Pretoria.; South Africa has an embassy in Tokyo.
Tunisia	June 1956	See Foreign relations of Tunisia Japan and Tunisia have a mutual free visa agreement.: Japan has an embassy in Cité Mahrajène, Tunis.; Tunisia has an embassy in Kudanminami, Chiyoda, Tokyo.

=== Americas ===
Japan has continued to extend significant support to development and technical assistance projects in Latin America.

Country	Formal relations began	Notes
Argentina	3 February 1898	See Argentina–Japan relations Argentina maintains an embassy in Tokyo and Japan maintains an embassy in Buenos Aires. Diplomatic relations were restored by the signing of the San Francisco Peace Treaty in 1952. Argentine president Arturo Frondizi visited Japan in 1960, and subsequently bilateral trade and Japanese investment into Argentina have increased in importance. Japanese imports were primarily foodstuffs and raw materials, while exports were mostly machinery and finished products. Members of the Imperial Family of Japan have visited Argentina on a number of occasions, including Prince and Princess Takamado in 1991, Emperor and Empress Akihito in 1997 and Prince and Princess Akishino in 1998. Argentine President Raúl Alfonsín visited Japan in 1986, as did President Carlos Menem in 1990, 1993 and 1998.
Barbados	29 August 1967	See Barbados–Japan relations Japan was accredited to Barbados from its embassy in Port of Spain (Trinidad and Tobago) and an honorary consulate in Bridgetown. Since January 2016, Japan opened a new embassy directly in Bridgetown, Barbados. Barbados is represented towards Japan through a non-resident ambassador in Bridgetown.
Bolivia	3 April 1914	See Bolivia–Japan relations: Bolivia has an embassy in Tokyo.; Japan has an embassy in La Paz and a consular office in Santa Cruz de la Sierra.; There are around 15,000 Bolivians who are of Japanese descent. (See also Japanese Bolivians)
Brazil	1895	See Brazil–Japan relations: Brazil has an embassy in Tokyo and consulates-general in Hamamatsu and Nagoya.; Japan has an embassy in Brasília and consulates-general in Belém, Curitiba, Manaus, Rio de Janeiro, São Paulo and consular offices in Recife and Porto Alegre.
Canada	21 January 1928	See Canada–Japan relations Diplomatic relations between both countries officially began in 1950 with the opening of the Japanese consulate in Ottawa. In 1929, Canada opened its Tokyo legation, the first in Asia; and in that same year, Japan its Ottawa consulate to legation form. Some Canadian–Japanese contacts predate the mutual establishment of permanent legations. The first known Japanese immigrant to Canada, Manzo Nagano, landed in New Westminster, British Columbia in 1877. Japan's consulate in Vancouver was established in 1889, 40 years before its embassy was opened in Ottawa in 1929. Canadians G. G. Cochran helped in founding Doshisha University in Kyoto, and Davidson McDonald helped in establishing Aoyama Gakuin University in Tokyo. In the 1923 Great Kantō earthquake, a Canadian steamship, the RMS Empress of Australia and her captain, Samuel Robinson achieved international acclaim for stalwart rescue efforts during the immediate aftermath of that disaster. Canadian military attaché Herbert Cyril Thacker served in the field with Japanese forces in the Russo-Japanese War (1904–05), for which the Japanese government awarded him the Order of the Sacred Treasure, Third Class and the Japanese War medal for service during that campaign. Canada and Japan have had diplomatic relations since 1928. Both countries are characterized by their active role in the Asia-Pacific community, as well as a relationship consisting of important economic, political, and socio-cultural ties. As major international donors, both Canada and Japan are strongly committed to promoting human rights, sustainable development and peace initiatives. Canada–Japan relations are underpinned by their partnership in multilateral institutions: the G-7/8; the United Nations; the Organisation for Economic Co-operation and Development, the Quad (Canada, the European Union, Japan and the United States), and by their common interest in the Pacific community, including participation in the Asia-Pacific Economic Cooperation forum (APEC) and the ASEAN Regional Forum (ARF). Emperor Akihito and Empress Michiko visited Canada in 2009.
Chile	25 September 1897	See Chile–Japan relations: Chile and Japan established diplomatic relations on 25 September 1897. During World War II, relations between both countries were severed. Chilean President Juan Antonio Ríos suspended relations with Japan on 20 January 1943 and in February 1945, he declared a "state of belligerancy". Finally, on 12 April 1945, Chile declared war against Japan. Relations were re-established on 7 October 1952 after the signing of San Francisco Peace Treaty.; Japan has an embassy in Santiago de Chile; Chile has an embassy and a consulate-general in Tokyo and three honorary consulates in Osaka, Sapporo and Nagasaki.
Colombia	25 May 1908	See Colombia–Japan relations The relationship was officially established in 1908, only interrupted between 1942 and 1954 with the surge of World War II. Relations are mostly based on commercial trade that has favored Japan interests such as Colombian coffee (which Japan imports a lot), cultural exchanges and technological and philanthropic aid to Colombia.
Cuba	21 December 1929	See Cuba–Japan relations Cuba and Japan established diplomatic relations on 21 December 1929.
Ecuador	26 August 1918	See Ecuador–Japan relations
Mexico	30 November 1888	See Japan–Mexico relations The Treaty of Amity, Commerce, and Navigation concluded in 1888 between Japan and Mexico was the nation's first "equal" treaty with any country; which overshadows Tokugawa Ieyasu's pre-Edo period initiatives which sought to establish official relations with the New Spain in Mexico. In 1897, the 35 members of the so-called Enomoto Colonization Party settle in the Mexican state of Chiapas. This was the first organized emigration from Japan to Latin America. President Álvaro Obregón was awarded Japan's Order of the Chrysanthemum at a special ceremony in Mexico City. On 27 November 1924, Baron Shigetsuma Furuya, Special Ambassador from Japan to Mexico, conferred the honor on Obregón. It was reported that this had been the first time that the Order had been conferred outside the Imperial family. In 1952, Mexico becomes the second country to ratify the San Francisco Peace Treaty, preceded only by the United Kingdom. Mexico and Japan on 17 September 2004, signed the "Agreement Between Japan and The United Mexican States for the Strengthening of The Economic Partnership." This was among the many historic steps led by Prime Minister Junichiro Koizumi to strengthen global economic stability.
Paraguay	17 November 1919	See Japan–Paraguay relations: Commercial relations started prior to the establishment of diplomatic relations. Trade agreement was signed in Asunción on 17 November 1919.; Japan has an embassy in Asunción.; Paraguay has an embassy in Tokyo.; There are around 10,000 Paraguayans who are of Japanese descent, whose ancestors came to Paraguay between 1936 and 1959. (See also Japanese Paraguayans); Japanese Ministry of Foreign Affairs about relations with Paraguay; Paraguayan Ministry of Foreign Relations about relations with Japan
Peru	21 August 1873	See Japan–Peru relations: Japan has an embassy in Lima.; Peru has an embassy in Tokyo and a consulate-general in Nagoya.
Trinidad and Tobago	May 1964	See Japan–Trinidad and Tobago relations
United States	29 July 1858	See Japan–United States relations U.S. President Joe Biden and Japanese Prime Minister Fumio Kishida on 23 May 2022 The United States is Japan's closest ally, and Japan relies on the U.S. for its national security to a high degree. As two of the world's top three economic powers, both countries also rely on close economic ties for their wealth, despite ongoing and occasionally acrimonious trade frictions. After Japan's defeat in World War II, the Japanese-ruled Northern Mariana Islands came under control of the United States. Although its constitution and government policy preclude an offensive military role for Japan in international affairs, Japanese cooperation with the United States through the 1960 U.S.–Japan Security Treaty has been important to the peace and stability of East Asia. Currently, there are domestic discussions about possible reinterpretation of Article 9 of the Japanese Constitution. All postwar Japanese governments have relied on a close relationship with the United States as the foundation of their foreign policy and have depended on the mutual security treaty for strategic protection. The relationship probably hit a post-war nadir around the early 1990s, when Japan's "economic rise" was seen as a threat to American power. Japan was the primary financier of the Gulf War, yet received major criticism in some US circles for its refusal to commit actual military support. Following the collapse of the so-called Bubble economy and the 1990s boom in the US, the Japanese economy was perceived as less of a threat to US interests. Some observers still feel that Japan's willingness to deploy troops in support of current US operations in Iraq, as spearheaded by Koizumi and the conservative Liberal Democratic Party, reflects a vow not to be excluded from the group of countries the US considers friends. This decision may reflect a realpolitik understanding of the threat Japan faces from a rapidly modernizing China, which from its continued and indeed growing pattern of anti-Japanese demonstrations reveals the belief that old historical scores remain unsettled.
Uruguay	24 September 1921	See Japan–Uruguay relations: Japan has an embassy in Montevideo.; Uruguay has an embassy in Tokyo.; There are several thousand people of Japanese descent living in Uruguay. (See also Japanese Uruguayans); Japanese Ministry of Foreign Affairs about relations with Uruguay
Venezuela	19 August 1938	See Japan–Venezuela relations Formal diplomatic relations between the countries were established in August 1938. Venezuela broke off diplomatic ties with Japan (and the other Axis powers) in December 1941, shortly after the Japanese attack on Pearl Harbor. In 1999, Venezuelan President Hugo Chávez made a three-day trip to Japan. He made another two-day trip in 2009, during which he met Prime Minister Tarō Asō. In February 2019, Japan recognized Venezuelan opposition leader Juan Guaido as Venezuelan legitimate president.

=== Asia ===
Results of 2013 Pew Research Center poll Asia/Pacific views of Japan by country (sorted by fav − unfav)
Country polled	Positive	Negative	Neutral	Pos − Neg
China	4%	90%	6	-86
South Korea	22%	77%	1	-55
Pakistan	51%	7%	42	44
Philippines	78%	18%	4	60
Australia	78%	16%	6	62
Indonesia	79%	12%	9	67
Malaysia	80%	6%	14	74

==== Southeast Asia ====
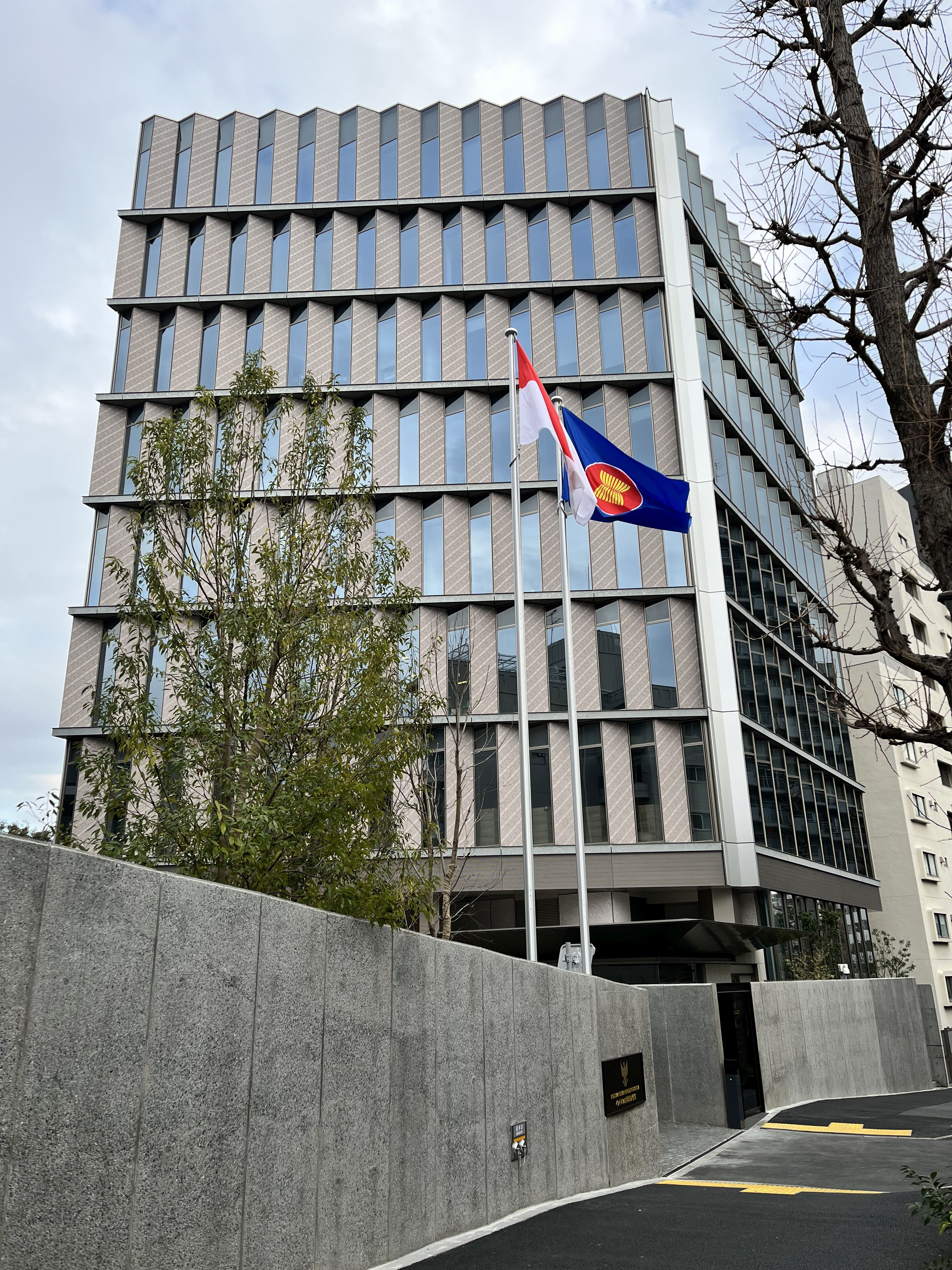
Embassy of Indonesia in Japan

By 1990 Japan's interaction with the vast majority of Asia-Pacific countries, especially its burgeoning economic exchanges, was multifaceted and increasingly important to the recipient countries. The developing countries of the Association of Southeast Asian Nations (ASEAN) regarded Japan as critical to their development. Japan's aid to the ASEAN countries totaled US$1.9 billion in Japanese fiscal year (FY) 1988 versus about US$333 million for the United States during U.S. FY 1988. As of the late 1980s, Japan was the number one foreign investor in the ASEAN countries, with cumulative investment as of March 1989 of about US$14.5 billion, more than twice that of the United States. Japan's share of total foreign investment in ASEAN countries in the same period ranged from 70 to 80 percent in Thailand to 20 percent in Indonesia.

In the late 1980s, the Japanese government was making a concerted effort to enhance its diplomatic stature, especially in Asia. Toshiki Kaifu's much publicized spring 1991 tour of five Southeast Asian nations—Malaysia, Brunei, Thailand, Singapore, and the Philippines—culminated in a 3 May major foreign policy address in Singapore, in which he called for a new partnership with the ASEAN and pledged that Japan would go beyond the purely economic sphere to seek an "appropriate role in the political sphere as a nation of peace." As evidence of this new role, Japan took an active part in promoting negotiations to resolve the Cambodian conflict.

In 1997, the ASEAN member nations and the People's Republic of China, South Korea and Japan agreed to hold yearly talks to further strengthen regional cooperation, the ASEAN Plus Three meetings. In 2005 the ASEAN plus Three countries together with India, Australia and New Zealand held the inaugural East Asia Summit (EAS).

==== South Asia ====
In South Asia, Japan's role is mainly that of an aid donor. Japan's aid to seven South Asian countries totaled US$1.1 billion in 1988. Except for Pakistan, which received heavy inputs of aid from the United States, all other South Asian countries received most of their aid from Japan as of the early 1990s. Four South Asian nations—India, Pakistan, Bangladesh, and Sri Lanka—are in the top ten list of Tokyo's aid recipients worldwide as of the early 1990s. A point to note is that Indian Government has received no aid since the 2004 Tsunami that struck India but Indian registered NGOs look to Japan for much investment in their projects.

Prime Minister Toshiki Kaifu signaled a broadening of Japan's interest in South Asia with his swing through the region in April 1990. In an address to the Indian parliament, Kaifu stressed the role of free markets and democracy in bringing about "a new international order," and he emphasized the need for a settlement of the Kashmir territorial dispute between India and Pakistan and for economic liberalization to attract foreign investment and promote dynamic growth. To India, which was very short of hard currency, Kaifu pledged a new concessional loan of ¥100 billion (about US$650 million) for the coming year.

Japan's engagement with the Middle East region reflects a sophisticated, multi-dimensional approach that has evolved since the 1973 oil crisis. Initially driven by energy security concerns, Japan's strategy now includes economic partnerships, cultural exchanges, and political collaboration. By strengthening ties with both energy-exporting nations like Saudi Arabia and non-energy-focused countries such as Egypt, Japan has built a network of interdependence that extends beyond oil to broader strategic and cultural dimensions.

Country	Formal relations began	Notes
Afghanistan	19 November 1930	See Afghanistan–Japan relations Afghan–Japanese relations have existed as far back as World War II, and have been mainly positive. The Japanese government in 1974 started feasibility study under grant aid to develop and built television in Afghanistan.
Azerbaijan	27 January 1992	See Azerbaijan–Japan relations: Azerbaijan has an embassy in Tokyo.; Japan has an embassy in Baku.
Bahrain	15 May 1974	See Bahrain–Japan relations
Bangladesh	February 1972	See Bangladesh–Japan relations Bangladeshi–Japanese relations were established in February 1972. Japan is Bangladesh's 11th-largest export market; imports from Bangladesh make up 26% of all Japanese imports from the least developed countries, second only to those from Cambodia. Common imports from Bangladesh to Japan include leather goods, ready-made garments, and shrimp. By 2004, Japan had become Bangladesh's fourth-largest source of foreign direct investment, behind the United States, United Kingdom, and Malaysia. Japan's political goals in its relationship with Bangladesh include gaining support for their bid to join the United Nations Security Council, and securing markets for their finished goods. Japan is a significant source of development aid to Bangladesh.
Bhutan	28 March 1986	See Bhutan–Japan relations
Brunei	2 April 1984	See Brunei–Japan relations Brunei has an embassy in Tokyo, and Japan has an embassy in Bandar Seri Begawan. Relations has been established since 2 April 1984.
Cambodia	1953	See Cambodia–Japan relations Japan has an embassy in Phnom Penh. Trade is sizable between the two countries: Japan to Cambodia: 14.0 billion yen (2006); Cambodia to Japan: 9.5 billion yen (2006); Japanese investment in Cambodia includes Phnom Penh Commercial Bank, a joint venture of Hyundai Switzerland and Japanese SBI Group, opened in 2008. Japan remains Cambodia's top donor country providing some US$1.2 billion in total overseas development assistance (ODA) during the period since 1992. In 2006, Japanese and Cambodian governments signed an agreement outlining a new Japanese aid program worth US$59 million. The Japanese Government has provided significant assistance for demining and education.: Japanese embassy in Cambodia
China	1972	See China–Japan relations Embassy of Japan in Beijing During the Meiji Era, China was one of the first countries to experience the effects of Japanese Imperialism. After the establishment of the People's Republic of China (PRC) in 1949, relations with Japan changed from hostility and an absence of contact to cordiality and extremely close cooperation in many fields. During the 1960s the two countries resumed trade for the first time since World War II under the Liao–Takasaki Agreement. On 29 September 1972, Japan and China signed a treaty establishing diplomatic relations between the states. The 1990s led to an enormous growth in China's economic welfare. Trade between Japan and China was one of the many reasons China was able to grow in the double-digit rates during the 1980s and 1990s. Japan was in the forefront among leading industrialized nations in restoring closer economic and political relations with China. China and Japan's bilateral relationship has often been referred to as "politically cold and economically warm". The two countries have been able to keep their political issues separate in hopes of being able to continue to benefit from each other's economic success and prosperity. Resumption of Japan's multibillion-dollar investments to China and increased visits to China by Japanese officials, culminating in the October 1992 visit of Emperor Akihito, gave a clear indication that Japan considered closer ties with China in its economic and strategic interest. Despite a 1995 apology regarding World War II by Japanese Prime Minister Tomiichi Murayama, tensions still remain, mostly because many Chinese feel there is a lack of true remorse for wartime crimes committed by Imperial Japanese forces. This has been reinforced by numerous visits to the Yasukuni Shrine by Japanese Prime Ministers, attempts to revise textbooks by Japanese nationalists, the continued dispute over Japan's atrocities in the Nanking Massacre, and the resurgence of nationalism and militarism in Japan. The resurgence of Japan's nationalism has changed widespread feelings about China among citizens. During the post-war period, many Japanese people acknowledged and appreciated China's influence on their culture and the country's achievements. However, the approval rate of the country began to go down due to a lack of acknowledgement of Japan's past economic contribution to China's development as China grew to be one of the largest economies in east Asia, China's military and economic growth and what that would mean for the possibility of growth in Japan, and the 2004 anti-Japanese nationalism protests in China, Relations between China and Japan have also been strained due to territory politics such as fights over The Senkaku/Diaoyu Islands continue. Because the two are highly engaged economically, the countries try to keep their issues at bay but, as social disapproval increases and disagreements drawn out, it is possible the relationship between the two countries could shift.
India	28 April 1952	See India–Japan relations Indian, Japanese and US naval warships take part in a military exercise near Bōsō Peninsula in 2007. India is one of the only three nations with whom Japan has a security pact, the other two being the United States and Australia. Throughout history, bilateral foreign relations between Japan and India have generally been friendly and strong. In December 2006, Prime Minister Singh's visit to Japan culminated in the signing of the "Joint Statement Towards Japan–India Strategic and Global Partnership". According to Prime Minister Shinzō Abe's arc of freedom theory, it is in Japan's interests to develop closer ties with India, world's most populous democracy, while its relations with China remain chilly. To this end, Japan has funded many infrastructure projects in India, most notably in New Delhi's metro subway system and Maruti.India and Japan have signed a deal to build high speed trains in India Indian applicants have been welcomed in 2006–07 to the JET Programme, starting with just one slot available in 2006 and 41 in 2007. India and Japan signed a security cooperation agreement in which both will hold military exercises, police the Indian Ocean and conduct military-to-military exchanges on fighting terrorism, making India one of only three countries, the others being the United States and Australia, with which Japan has such a security pact. Japan is aiding India in building the High Speed Railway by giving India money and there are plans to export Japan's Shinkansen to India. There are 25,000 Indians in Japan as of 2008. India proposed expanding basmati rice and processed food exports to Japan under the bilateral CEPA review in August 2026.
Indonesia	15 April 1958	See Indonesia–Japan relations: Indonesia has an embassy in Tokyo and a consulate in Osaka. Japan has an embassy in Jakarta, consulate-general in Surabaya, and consulates in Medan, Denpasar, Makassar.; Japan is Indonesia's largest export partner.; Both countries are members of the G20 major economies and APEC.
Iran	1878	See Iran–Japan relations Japan's foreign policy towards and investments in Iran have historically been dominated by the desire to secure reliable energy supplies; Iran is Japan's third-largest oil supplier after Saudi Arabia and the United Arab Emirates. Iran and Japan signed a visa-free travel arrangement in 1974, but it was terminated in April 1992 due to large-scale illegal Iranian migration to Japan. Iran and Japan also cooperate on regional foreign policy issues in the Middle East, such as the reconstruction of Afghanistan and the Israeli–Palestinian conflict. Since 2004, Japan has been working on developing Iran's largest on-shore oil field, located at Azadegan.
Israel	15 May 1952	See Israel–Japan relations The Japanese government refrained from appointing a Minister Plenipotentiary to Israel until 1955. Relations between the two states were distant at first, but after 1958, as demand no break occurred. This had been at the same time that OPEC had imposed an oil embargo against several countries, including Japan. Recently ties between Israel and Japan have strengthened significantly, with many mutual investments between the two nations. Japanese prime minister Shinzo Abe visited Israel twice – once in 2015 and a second time in 2018.: Israel has an embassy in Tokyo.; Japan has an embassy in Tel Aviv and an honorary consulate in Jerusalem.
Jordan	14 July 1954	Both countries established diplomatic relations on 14 July 1954. Japan is one of Jordan's biggest donors.
Laos	5 March 1955	See Japan-Laos relations
Lebanon	November 1954	The embassy of Japan in Lebanon is located in the Serail Hill Area, Army Street, Zokak El-Blat, Beirut. The current ambassador is Yoshihisa Kuroda.; The embassy of Lebanon in Japan is located in Nagatachō, Chiyoda, Tokyo.; The Ministry of Foreign Affairs of Japan: Japan–Lebanon Relations
Malaysia	31 August 1957	See Japan–Malaysia relations Japan has an embassy in Kuala Lumpur, and consulates in George Town and Kota Kinabalu. Malaysia maintains an embassy in Tokyo. The Japanese and Malaysian governments had visited each other on multiple occasions. Notable visits include the King of Malaysia visiting Japan in 2005 while in 2006, the Emperor and Empress of Japan visited Malaysia.
Maldives	6 November 1967	See Japan–Maldives relations
Mongolia	1972	See Mongolia–Japan relations: Japan has an embassy in Ulaanbaatar.; Mongolia has an embassy in Tokyo.; Japan Ministry of Foreign Affairs- Mongolia; Mongolian Ministry of Foreign Affairs: list of bilateral treaties with Japan (in Mongolian)
Myanmar	1 December 1954	See Japan–Myanmar relations
Nepal	28 July 1956	See Japan–Nepal relations: Japan has an embassy in Kathmandu.; Nepal has an embassy in Tokyo.
North Korea		See Japan–North Korea relations No formal relations have been established between Japan and North Korea, though Japanese politicians have occasionally visited North Korea. Relations between Japan and North Korea have been historical hostile with incidents of confrontation. Japan strongly supports the U.S. in its efforts to encourage North Korea to abide by the nuclear Non-Proliferation Treaty and its agreements with the International Atomic Energy Agency (IAEA). Despite 31 August 1998 North Korean missile test which overflew the Home Islands, Japan has maintained its support for the Korean Energy Development Organization (KEDO) and the Agreed Framework, which seeks to freeze the North Korean nuclear program. The U.S., Japan, and South Korea closely coordinate and consult trilaterally on policy toward North Korea, at least on a government level. Japan has limited economic and commercial ties with North Korea. Japanese normalization talks halted when North Korea refused to discuss a number of issues with Japan.
Pakistan	28 April 1952	See Japan–Pakistan relations: There has been a regular exchange of high level visits between the two countries.; The 50th anniversary of the establishment of diplomatic relations, jointly celebrated by the two countries in 2002, was a significant landmark in the history of this friendship.; There are at least 10,000 Pakistanis residing in Japan.
Philippines	July 1956	See Japan-Philippines relations Relations between Japan and the Philippines were generally very strong since the end of World War II. It span a period from before the 16th century to the present. The Philippines gained independence from the United States in 1946. Diplomatic relations were re-established in 1956, when a war reparations agreement was concluded. By the end of the 1950s, Japanese companies and individual investors had begun to return to the Philippines and in 1975, Japan displaced the United States as the main source of investment in the Philippines.
Qatar	1972	See Japan–Qatar relations
Saudi Arabia	June 1955	See Japan–Saudi Arabia relations Saudi Arabian – Japan relations were established during the past half a century. Saudi–Japanese relations are based on mutual respect and common interests in all areas.
Singapore	26 April 1966	See Japan–Singapore relations
South Korea	December 1965	See Japan–South Korea relations Japan and South Korea have had many disputes. Former South Korean President Roh Moo-hyun rejected a conference with the Japanese Prime Minister Junichiro Koizumi following his visits to the controversial Yasukuni Shrine. Many Koreans thought the presence of the Minister attending was a clear indication of the lack of respect and accountability Japan has done regarding the historical story of Japanese imperialism. Protests occurred in South Korea with citizens demanding the President to moblize and respond to the Japanese minister's offense and lack of remorse. Other long-running issues between the two countries include The Sea of Japan naming dispute, territorial disputes over the Liancourt Rocks theses disputes are long lasting effects of nationalistic feelings that overtime leaders have been able to use as part of political agenda. For Koreans, feelings of hope are also intermingled with deep rooted hostility towards the Japanese neighbors who once occupied their country and who still claim the islets as theirs. Takeshima is "indisputably an inherent part of the territory of Japan, in light of historical facts and based on international law", says the Japanese Ministry of Foreign Affairs. It adds that the Republic of Korea has been occupying Takeshima with "no basis in international law," and that it will continue to seek the settlement "in a calm and peaceful manner". Additionally, disagreement about whether or not the matter of World War II-era forced prostitution has been resolved, so tensions between both countries have at times escalated situations surrounding elections and economic trade deals which have impacted both positive and negative interactions. While there has been compensation to the women and the families of the sex slave genuine polices to resolve the issue still arises during talks of cooperation especially since some are still living and the fact that many Japanese historical textbooks change the number of women or tend to ignore the very fact why the state is anti-military it was because of the abuses that occurred during the imperial times which makes cooperation between the two difficult. But with recent change in leadership and the objective to build up their trust we have seen talks of positive interactions moving forward.
Sri Lanka	1952	See Japan–Sri Lanka relations: Japan has an embassy in Colombo.; Sri Lanka has an embassy in Tokyo
Syria	December 1953	See Japan–Syria relations: Japan has an embassy in Damascus; Syria has an Embassy of Syria in Tokyo.
Taiwan	1952	See Japan–Taiwan relations Taiwan was ceded to Japan in 1895 and was a major Japanese prefecture in World War II. Following the unconditional surrender of Japan to Allied Powers after World War II, Taiwan was relinquished by Japan as a stolen territory from China (like Manchukuo) by the San Francisco Peace Treaty in 1951. Current relations are guided by the 1972 Japan–PRC Joint Communique. Since the joint Communique, Japan has maintained non-governmental, working-level relations with Taiwan. Japan refers to the Republic of China on Taiwan with the neutral name "Taiwan."
Thailand	26 September 1887	See Japan–Thailand relations Japan–Thailand relations span a period from the 17th century to the present. Contacts had an early start with Japanese trade on Red seal ships and the installation of Japanese communities on Siamese soil, only to be broken off with Japan's period of seclusion. Contacts resumed in the 19th century and developed to the point where Japan is today one of Thailand's foremost economic partners. Thailand and Japan share the distinction of never having lost sovereignty during the Colonial period.
Timor-Leste	20 May 2002	See East Timor–Japan relations
Turkey	1890s	See Japan–Turkey relations: First embassies were opened in 1925.; Japan has an embassy in Ankara and a consulate-general in Istanbul.; Turkey has an embassy in Tokyo.; There are 10,000 Turks living in Japan.; Turkish Ministry of Foreign Affairs about the relations with Japan
Vietnam	21 September 1973	See Japan–Vietnam relations Vietnamese–Japanese relations stretch back to at least the 16th century, when the two countries engaged in friendly trade. Modern relations between the two countries are based on Vietnam's developing economy and Japan's role as an investor and foreign aid donor.

=== Europe ===
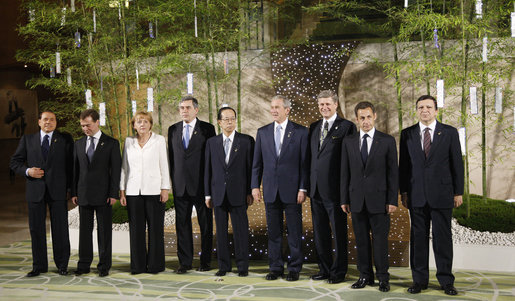
34th G8 summit (Tōyako Town, Hokkaidō)

In what became known as the Tenshō embassy, the first ambassadors from Japan to European powers reached Lisbon, Portugal in August 1584. From Lisbon, the ambassadors left for the Vatican in Rome, which was the main goal of their journey. The embassy returned to Japan in 1590, after which time the four nobleman ambassadors were ordained by Alessandro Valignano as the first Japanese Jesuit fathers.

A second embassy, headed by Hasekura Tsunenaga and sponsored by Date Masamune, was also a diplomatic mission to the Vatican. The embassy left 28 October 1613 from Ishinomaki, Miyagi Prefecture, in the northern Tōhoku region of Japan, where Date was daimyō. It traveled to Europe by way of New Spain, arriving in Acapulco on 25 January 1614, Mexico City in March, Havana in July, and finally Seville on 23 October 1614. After a short stop-over in France, the embassy reached Rome in November 1615, where it was received by Pope Paul V. After return travel by way of New Spain and the Philippines, the embassy reached the harbor of Nagasaki in August 1620. While the embassy was gone, Japan had undergone significant change, starting with the 1614 Osaka Rebellion, leading to a 1616 decree from the Tokugawa shogunate that all interaction with non-Chinese foreigners was confined to Hirado and Nagasaki. In fact, the only western country that was allowed to trade with Japan was the Dutch Republic. This was the beginning of "sakoku", where Japan was essentially closed to the western world until 1854.

==== Modern era ====
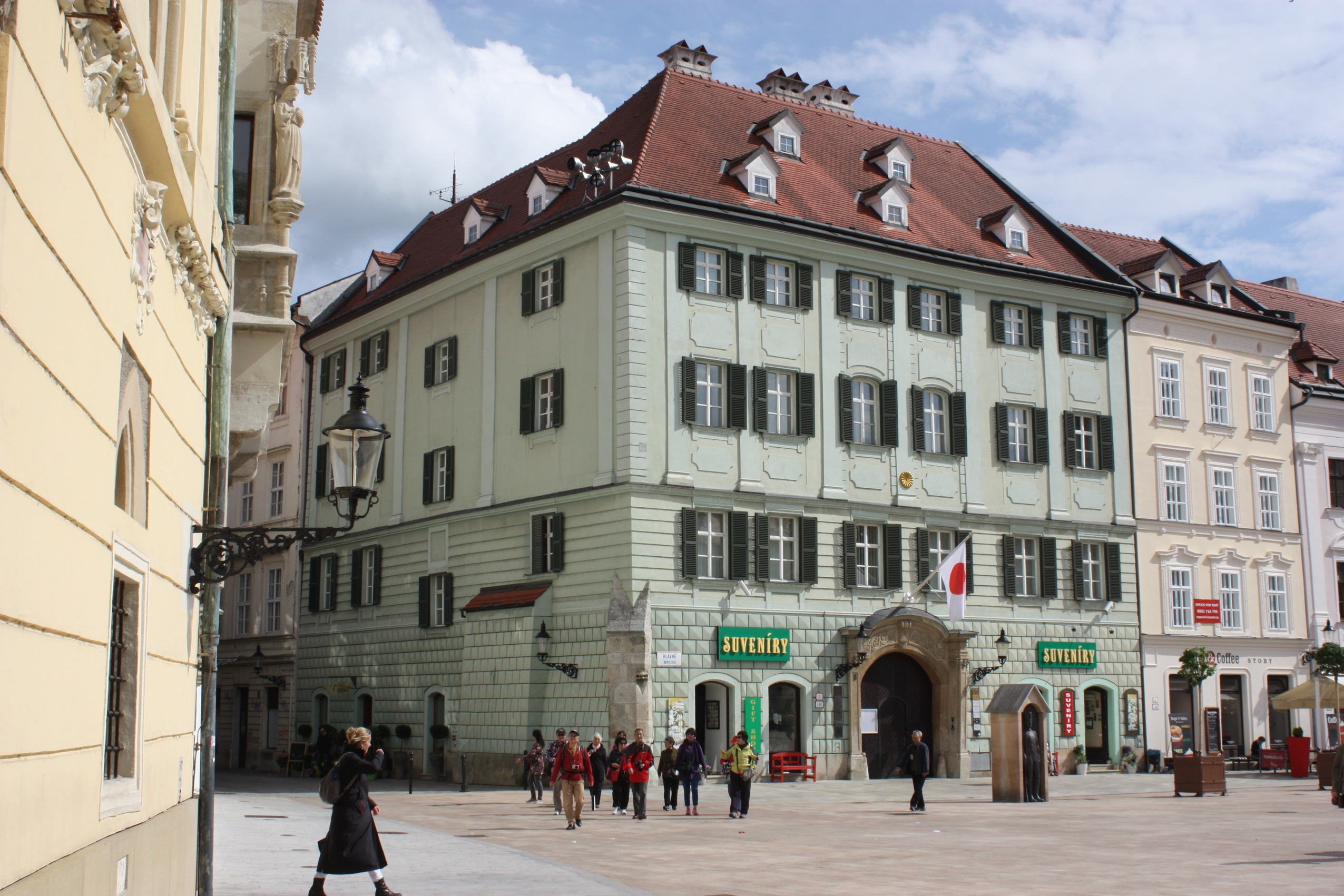
Embassy of Japan in Bratislava, Slovakia

The cultural and non-economic ties with Western Europe grew significantly during the 1980s, although the economic nexus remained by far the most important element of Japanese – West European relations throughout the decade. Events in West European relations, as well as political, economic, or even military matters, were topics of concern to most Japanese commentators because of the immediate implications for Japan. The major issues centered on the effect of the coming West European economic unification on Japan's trade, investment, and other opportunities in Western Europe. Some West European leaders were anxious to restrict Japanese access to the newly integrated European Union, but others appeared open to Japanese trade and investment. In partial response to the strengthening economic ties among nations in Western Europe and to the United States–Canada–Mexico North American Free Trade Agreement, Japan and other countries along the Asia-Pacific rim began moving in the late 1980s toward greater economic cooperation.

On 18 July 1991, after several months of difficult negotiations, Prime Minister Toshiki Kaifu signed a joint statement with the Dutch prime minister and head of the European Community Council, Ruud Lubbers, and with the European Commission president, Jacques Delors, pledging closer Japanese – European Community consultations on foreign relations, scientific and technological cooperation, assistance to developing countries, and efforts to reduce trade conflicts. Japanese Ministry of Foreign Affairs officials hoped that this agreement would help to broaden Japanese – European Community political links and raise them above the narrow confines of trade disputes.

Country	Formal relations began	Notes
Albania	April 1922; re-established in 1981	See Albania–Japan relations Albania and Japan resumed established diplomatic relations in March 1981.: Albania has an embassy in Tokyo.; Japan has an embassy in Tirana.
Armenia	7 September 1992	See Armenia–Japan relations: Armenia has an embassy in Tokyo.; Japan has an embassy in Yerevan.; Japanese Ministry of Foreign Affairs about relations with Armenia
Austria	18 October 1869	See Austria–Japan relations: Austria has an embassy in Tokyo and 4 honorary consulates (in Hiroshima, Nagoya, Osaka and Sapporo).; Japan has an embassy in Vienna and an honorary consulate in Salzburg.
Belgium	1 August 1866	See Belgium–Japan relations: Belgium has an embassy in Tokyo.; Japan has an embassy in Brussels.
Bulgaria	1890s	See Bulgaria–Japan relations: Bulgaria has an embassy in Tokyo and an honorary consulate in Yokohama.; Japan has an embassy in Sofia.; Japanese Ministry of Foreign Affairs about relations with Bulgaria
Croatia	5 March 1992	See Croatia–Japan relations: Croatia has an embassy in Tokyo.; Japan has an embassy in Zagreb.
Czech Republic	12 January 1920	See Czech Republic–Japan relations: The Czech Republic has an embassy in Tokyo.; Japan has an embassy in Prague.
Denmark	1867	See Denmark–Japan relations: Denmark has an embassy in Tokyo.; Japan has an embassy in Copenhagen.
Estonia	26 January 1921;10 October 1991	See Estonia–Japan relations: Estonia has an embassy in Tokyo.; Japan has an embassy in Tallinn.
European Union	1959	See Japan–European Union relations
Finland	6 September 1919	See Finland–Japan relations: Finland has an embassy in Tokyo.; Japan has an embassy in Helsinki.
France	9 October 1858	See France–Japan relations The history of Franco–Japanese relations (日仏関係, Nichi-Futsu kankei) goes back to the early 17th century, when a Japanese samurai and ambassador on his way to Rome landed for a few days in Southern France, creating a sensation. France and Japan have enjoyed a very robust and progressive relationship spanning centuries through various contacts in each other's countries by senior representatives, strategic efforts, and cultural exchanges.: France has an embassy in Tokyo.; Japan has an embassy in Paris.
Georgia	3 August 1992	See Georgia–Japan relations: Japan has extended foreign aid to Georgia for various economic and cultural development projects.; The balance of trade between the two nations is heavily in favor of Japan, with Japan exporting automobiles and manufactured goods, and Georgia exporting food products and chemicals.; Georgian President Eduard Shevardnadze made an official visit to Japan in March 1999 and President Mikheil Saakashvili visited Japan in March 2007.; Since November 2006, Georgia has maintained an embassy in Tokyo.; Japan has an embassy in Tbilisi.; Georgian Ministry of Foreign Affairs about the relations with Japan; Japanese Ministry of Foreign Affairs about the relations with Georgia
Germany	24 January 1861	See Germany–Japan relations Regular meetings between the two countries have led to several cooperations. In 2004 German Chancellor Gerhard Schröder and Prime Minister Junichiro Koizumi agreed upon cooperations in the assistance for reconstruction of Iraq and Afghanistan, the promotion of economic exchange activities, youth and sports exchanges as well as exchanges and cooperation in science, technology and academic fields.: Germany has an embassy in Tokyo.; Japan has an embassy in Berlin.
Greece	June 1899	See Greece–Japan relations There has been a Greek embassy in Tokyo since 1960, and a Japanese embassy in Athens since the same year, when it was decided to upgrade the Japanese Consulate which had opened in 1956. Since then the two countries have enjoyed excellent relations in all fields, and cooperate closely.: Greece has an embassy in Tokyo.; Japan has an embassy in Athens.
Holy See	March 1942	See Holy See–Japan relations The first Papal visit to Japan took place in 1981. the present Apostolic Nuncio to Japan is Joseph Chennoth (since 2011) Japan first sent an ambassador, Ken Harada, to the Vatican during World War II.
Hungary	1921	See Hungary–Japan relations: Hungary has an embassy in Tokyo and two honorary consulates (in Hamamatsu and Osaka).; Japan has an embassy in Budapest.; Japanese Ministry of Foreign Affairs about relations with Hungary
Iceland	8 December 1956	See Iceland–Japan relations: Iceland has an embassy in Tokyo.; Japan has an embassy in Reykjavík.
Ireland	March 1957	See Ireland–Japan relations: Ireland has an embassy in Tokyo.; Japan has an embassy in Dublin.
Italy	25 August 1866	See Italy–Japan relations: Italy has an embassy in Tokyo.; Japan has an embassy in Rome and a consulate-general in Milan.; Foreign Affairs Ministers of both nation held informal talks on the margins of the G7 Foreign Ministers’ meeting in Tokyo in early November 2023.
Kosovo	25 February 2009	See Japan–Kosovo relations Japan recognised it on 18 March 2008. The first Ambassador of Japan to the Republic of Kosovo is Akio Tanaka. He is subordinate to the Japanese Embassy in Vienna, Austria.
Latvia	10 October 1991	See Japan–Latvia relations: Latvia has an embassy in Tokyo.; Japan has an embassy in Riga.
Liechtenstein	June 1996	See Japan–Liechtenstein relations: Japan has an honorary consulate in Schaan.; The two countries signed a tax treaty in 2012.
Lithuania	1919;10 October 1991	See Japan–Lithuania relations: Japan has an embassy in Vilnius, established in 1997.; In 1998, Lithuania has an embassy in Tokyo.; Ambassador to Lithuania is Miyoko Akashi, ambassador to Japan is Dainius Kamaitis.; In 2007 the Emperor and Empress of Japan Akihito and Michiko paid an official visit in Lithuania.
Luxembourg		See Japan–Luxembourg relations: Luxembourg has an embassy in Tokyo.; Japan has an embassy in Luxembourg City.
Malta		See Japan–Malta relations: Malta has a consulate in Tokyo.; Japan has a consulate in Valletta.
Moldova	16 March 1992	Japan has a non-resident ambassador in Ukraine.; Minister of Foreign Affairs of the Republic of Moldova, Nicolae Tăbăcaru paid a visit to Japan from 31 January to 4 February 1999. It was a first official visit of a Cabinet Member of the Republic of Moldova to Japan. The visit has strengthened the friendly relations between Japan and the Republic of Moldova.; Since 2000 Japan implements in Moldova the grant programme for the improvement of agriculture and private farming.; Embassy of the Republic of Moldova in China; Ministers of Foreign Affairs of the Republic of Moldova; Japanese ministry of foreign affairs about Moldova
Montenegro	24 July 2006	See Japan–Montenegro relations Japan recognised Montenegro on 16 June 2006 and established diplomatic relations on 24 July 2006. Montenegro had declared war on Japan in 1905 during the Russo-Japanese War and never signed a peace treaty until 2006, shortly before the opening of diplomatic relations. The war lasted for 101 years. Trade, mostly related to electronics, exports from Japan to Montenegro (163 million yen per annum) outweigh Japan's imports (2 million yen per annum).: Japan is accredited to Montenegro from its embassy in Belgrade, Serbia.; Montenegro is accredited to Japan from its embassy in Beijing, China.
Netherlands	1609	See Japan–Netherlands relations The relations between Japan and the Netherlands after 1945 have been a triangular relationship. The invasion and Japanese occupation of the Dutch East Indies during World War II brought about the destruction of the colonial state in Indonesia, as the Japanese removed as much of the Dutch government as they could, weakening the post-war grip the Netherlands had over the territory. Under pressure from the United States, the Netherlands recognised Indonesian sovereignty in 1949 (see United States of Indonesia).: Japan has an embassy in The Hague.; Netherlands has an embassy in Tokyo.
Norway	1905–11	See Japan–Norway relations: Japan has an embassy in Oslo.; Norway has an embassy in Tokyo.
Poland	March 1919	See Japan–Poland relations: Japan has an embassy in Warsaw.; Poland has an embassy in Tokyo
Portugal	3 August 1860	See Japan–Portugal relations: Japan has an embassy in Lisbon.; Portugal has an embassy in Tokyo.; See also: Category:Japan–Portugal relations
Romania	18 June 1902	See Foreign relations of Romania#Asia: East Asia: The first representation of Romania in Japan was opened in 1921.; Japan was represented in Romania through its embassy in Vienna (Austria).; After World War II, both states resumed their diplomatic relations in 1959.; Japan has an embassy in Bucharest.; Romania has an embassy in Tokyo and four honorary consulates (in Atami, Osaka, Nagoya and Yokohama).; Japanese Ministry of Foreign affairs about relations with Romania
Russia	7 February 1855	See Japan–Russia relations Japan's relations with Russia are hampered by the two sides' inability to resolve their territorial dispute over the four islands that make up the Northern Territories (Kuriles), which the Soviet Union seized towards the end of World War II. The stalemate has prevented conclusion of a peace treaty formally ending the war. The dispute over the Kuril Islands exacerbated the Japan–Russo relations when the Japanese government published a new guideline for school textbooks on 16 July 2008 to teach Japanese children that their country has sovereignty over the Kuril Islands. The Russian public was outraged by the action the Foreign Minister of Russia criticized the action while reaffirming its sovereignty over the islands.
Serbia	reestablished in 1952	See Japan–Serbia relations: Japan has an embassy in Belgrade.; Serbia has an embassy in Tokyo and an honorary consulate in Osaka.
Slovenia	12 October 1992	Japan has an embassy in Ljubljana.; Slovenia has an embassy in Tokyo.; Japan Ministry of Foreign Affairs about relations with Slovenia
Spain	First contact in 1584, officialized in 1868. Relations were broken on 11 April 1945 and reestablished in 1952	See Japan–Spain relations: Japan has an embassy in Madrid and consulates in Barcelona and Las Palmas.; Spain has an embassy in Tokyo.; Since 1997, every year a Japan–Spain Symposium for the cultural exchange between the two countries is held.; Japanese Ministry of Foreign Affairs about relations with Spain; Spanish Embassy in Tokyo about Spanish relations with Japan
Sweden	1868	See Japan–Sweden relations: Japan has an embassy in Stockholm.; Sweden has an embassy in Tokyo.
Switzerland	6 February 1864	Japan has an embassy in Bern and a general consulate in Geneva.; Switzerland has an embassy in Tokyo.; Japanese Ministry of Foreign Affairs about relations with Switzerland; Swiss Federal Department of Foreign Affairs about relations with Japan
Ukraine	26 January 1992	See Japan–Ukraine relations: Japan extended diplomatic recognition to the Ukrainian state on 28 December 1991, immediately after the breakup of the Soviet Union; Ukraine maintains an embassy in Tokyo.; Japan maintains an embassy in Kyiv.
United Kingdom	26 August 1858	See Japan–United Kingdom relations British Prime Minister Keir Starmer with Japanese Prime Minister Shigeru Ishiba at a G20 summit in Rio de Janeiro, November 2024. Japan established diplomatic relations with the United Kingdom on 26 August 1858.: Japan maintains an embassy in London.; The United Kingdom is accredited to Japan through its embassy in Tokyo.; Both countries share common membership of CPTPP, the G7, the G20, the International Criminal Court, OECD, the United Nations, and the World Trade Organization. Bilaterally the two countries have a Comprehensive Economic Partnership Agreement, a Double Taxation Convention, and a Reciprocal Access Agreement.

=== Oceania ===
Country	Formal relations began	Notes
Australia	1947	See Australia–Japan relations Japanese Foreign Minister Katsuya Okada (left), U.S. Secretary of State Hillary Clinton (center) and Australian Foreign Minister Stephen Smith (right), in 2009 Australia–Japan relations have generally warm as well as acknowledged mutuality of strong interests, beliefs and friendship, and has since continued to grow strongly over the years. However, memories of World War II linger among the older members of the Australian public, as does a contemporary fear of Japanese economic domination over countries, particularly Australia, although such fears have fallen off in response to Japan's economic stagnation in the 1990s. At the same time, government and business leaders see Japan as a vital export market and an essential element in Australia's strong future growth and prosperity in the Asia-Pacific region. Australia is also a major source of food and raw materials for Japan. In 1988 Australia accounted for 5.5 percent of total Japanese imports, a share that held relatively steady in the late 1980s. Due to its ability to export raw materials, Australia had a trade surplus with Japan. Australia was the largest single supplier of coal, iron ore, wool, and sugar to Japan in 1988. Australia is also a supplier of uranium. Japanese investment by 1988 made Australia the single largest source of Japanese regional imports. Resource development projects in Australia attracted Japanese capital, as did trade protectionism by necessitating local production for the Australian market. Investments in Australia totaled US$8.1 billion in 1988, accounting for 4.4 percent of Japanese direct investment abroad. There is some tension regarding the issue of whaling.
Fiji	1 October 1970	See Fiji-Japan relations: Japan has an embassy in Suva and Fiji has an embassy in Tokyo.
New Zealand	1952	See Japan–New Zealand relations New Zealand Prime Minister Keith Holyoake (left) met with Japanese Foreign Minister Masayoshi Ohira (right), in October 1972. Japan–New Zealand relations have had generally cordial relations since the post-World War II period, with Japan being a major trading partner with New Zealand. These relations have held together despite policy disputes over whaling and the International Whaling Commission. In March 2011, New Zealand sent an urban search and rescue team, which had spent time the previous three weeks searching buildings after the last month's devastating earthquake in Christchurch, and 15 tonnes of rescue equipment to assist Japan following the Tōhoku earthquake and the subsequent of tsunami and Fukushima nuclear disaster. New Zealand Parliament sends condolences to the people of Japan, and the government donated $2 million to the Japanese Red Cross Society to support relief efforts.: New Zealand has an embassy in Tokyo.; Japan has an embassy in Wellington and two consulates-general in Auckland and Christchurch.
Palau	2 November 1994	See Japan–Palau relations
Tonga	1970	See Japan–Tonga relations Japan and the Kingdom of Tonga have maintained official diplomatic relations since July 1970. Japan is Tonga's leading donor in the field of technical aid. The Japanese government describes its relations with Tonga as "excellent", and states that "the Imperial family of Japan and the Royal family of Tonga have developed a cordial and personal relationship over the years".

== Disputed territories ==
Japan has several territorial disputes with its neighbors concerning the control of certain outlying islands.

Japan contests Russia's control of the Southern Kuril Islands (including Etorofu, Kunashiri, Shikotan, and the Habomai group) which were occupied by the Soviet Union in 1945. South Korea's assertions concerning Liancourt Rocks (Japanese: "Takeshima", Korean: "Dokdo") are acknowledged, but not accepted by Japan. Japan has strained relations with the People's Republic of China (PRC) and the Republic of China (Taiwan) over the Senkaku Islands; and with the People's Republic of China over the status of Okinotorishima.

== See also ==
- Foreign policy of Japan
- 1995 Okinawa rape incident
- List of diplomatic missions in Japan
- List of diplomatic missions of Japan
- List of international trips made by prime ministers of Japan
- List of war apology statements issued by Japan
- Hotta Masayoshi
- Visa requirements for Japanese citizens
