= Japan–Palau relations =

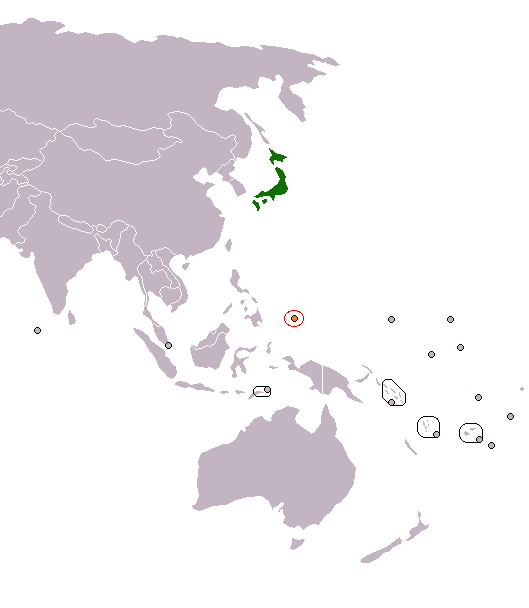
- Japan: Palau

Diplomatic mission
- Embassy of Japan, Koror: Embassy of Palau, Tokyo

Envoy
- Ambassador Hiroyuki Orikasa: Ambassador Peter Adelbai

Diplomatic relations are maintained between Japan and Palau, a small island country in the western Pacific Ocean that was once a trust territory governed by imperial Japan. There is a Japanese embassy at Ngerekebesang in Koror, and a Palauan embassy in Minato-ku, Tokyo.

== History ==
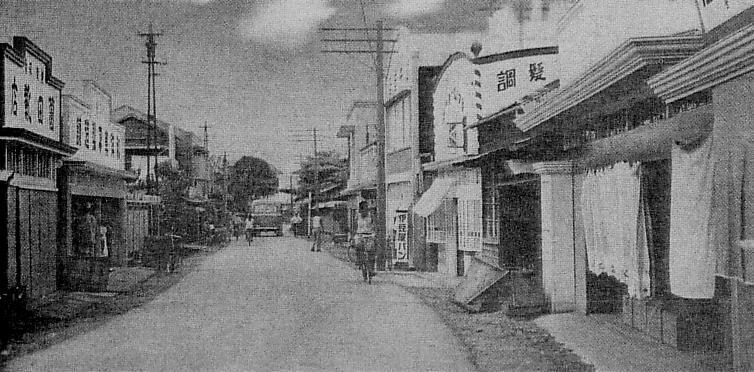
Koror under Japanese administration

In the 19th century and early 20th century, the Japanese used the term Nan’yō (South Sea) to refer to Micronesian islands including Palau, as well as neighboring areas such as Australia and Indonesia. By the 1920s, the term evolved into two distinct subgroupings that divided the space into inner and outer parts: the inner or UchiNan’yō referred to the Micronesian island groups encompassing Palau, the Caroline Islands, the Mariana Islands, the Marshall Islands, and the Gilbert Islands; the outer or UraNan’yō took on a wider expanse of territory, extending into the Indonesian archipelago and stretching as far as Australia.

The bilateral ties between the two countries originated in 1920, when Japan assumed control over the island colonies of the German colonial empire in the Pacific which included the present-day Federated States of Micronesia, the Marshall Islands, the Northern Marianas and Palau. The islands became part of the South Seas Mandate under the League of Nations and Koror was designated as the administrative center of the mandate. Under Japanese rule, Palau experienced significant development of its fishing, agriculture and mining industry. Palau achieved self-sufficiency to some degree during the period. Palau also served as a Japanese military base during World War II. Japanese administration over the islands ended following the defeat of Japan in the World War II. The South Seas Mandate became the Trust Territory of the Pacific Islands and it was administrated by the United States.

Japan recognized the independence of Palau from the United States on 1 October 1994 and established formal relations with Palau during the same year on November 2. The Japanese embassy in Koror opened in 1999. In 1995, Palau became a member of the Pacific Islands Forum, a regional body for Pacific Island countries. The organization was founded in 1971, and included the two large developed countries of Australia and New Zealand as founding members, but not island countries near Asia such as Japan and the Philippines. Since 1989, Japan has been a dialogue partner of the Pacific Islands Forum, and in 1997, it launched the Pacific Islands Leaders Meeting (PALM). This is a summit held every three years between Japan and the Pacific Islands Forum members to discuss regional goals.

== Cultural relations ==
As a former trust territory governed by imperial Japan, Palau was influenced by Japanese culture and as a result, many older residents speak Japanese and it is an official language in the state of Angaur. Contemporary Palauan has many words derived from Japanese such as "daijobu", "okyaku", "denki" and "senkyo". Local cuisine has also been influenced by the Japanese.

== Economic relations ==
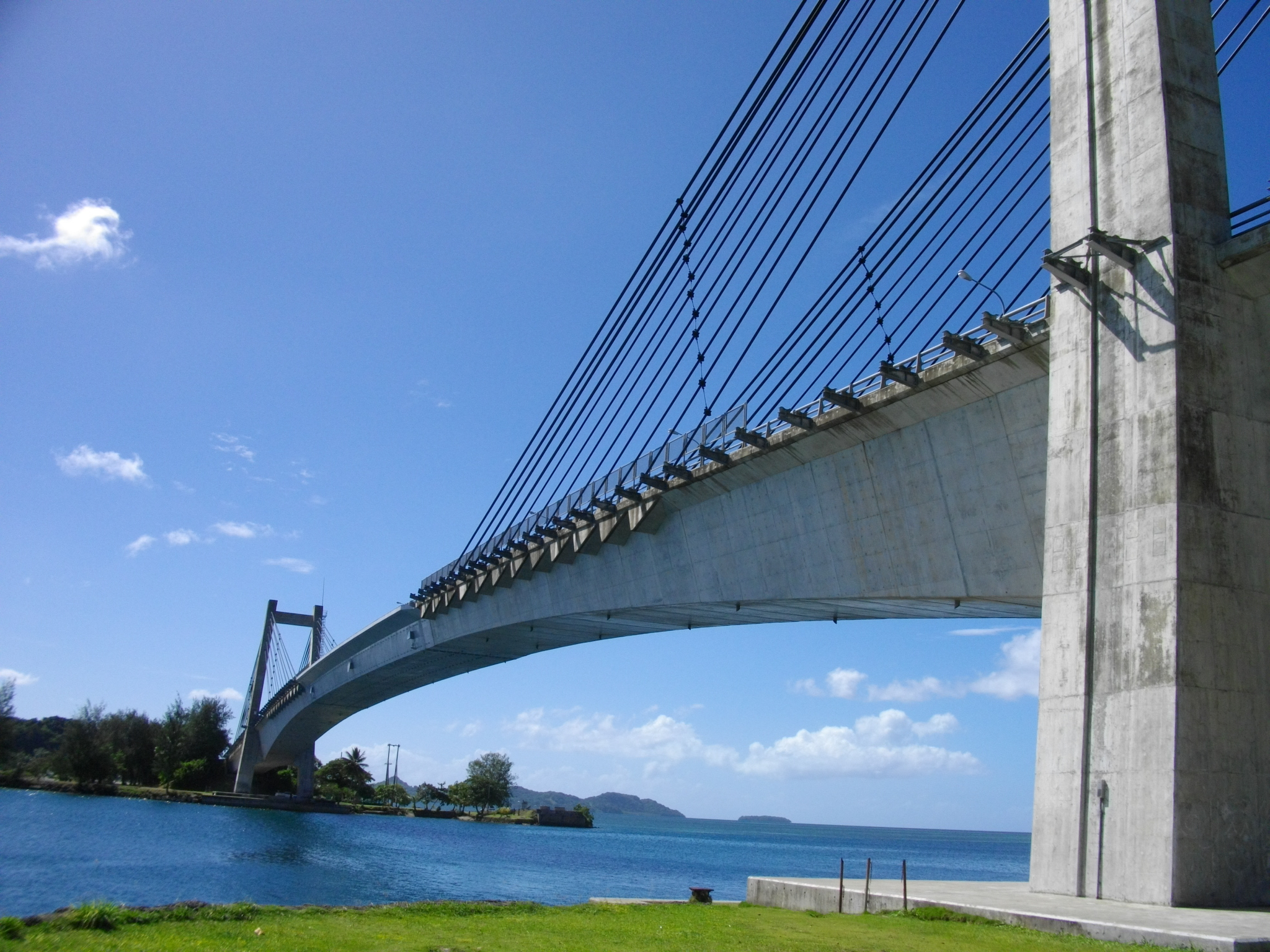
The Japan-Palau Friendship Bridge

Japan has supported Palau for more than 40 years as an important partner. The Japan-Palau Friendship Bridge, completed in 2002, represents Japan's long-standing support and friendship. The bridge is an essential part of Palau's daily transportation infrastructure.

Palau-based tuna shipping companies mainly export sashimi grade tuna to Japan. Licensing of fishing vessels from Japan remains a source of foreign exchange between Palau and Japan.

Palau has supported Japan's whaling rights in the past but has since abandoned its support in June 2010 in favor of catch quota proposal being considered by the International Whaling Commission. Johnson Toribiong asserted that his country's policy change won't affect Japan–Palau relations and claimed that Japan is "mature enough" to accept Palau's stand on whaling.

In October 2025, at the Japan-Palau Foreign Ministers' Meeting, based on the spacial relationship between Palau and Japan, Foreign Minister Gustav Aitaro responded and committed to work closely with Japan toward the realization of a Free and Open Indo-Pacific (FOIP).

On 29 October 2025, United Airlines reinstated and began operating direct scheduled flight course between Narita (NRT) and Koror (ROR) the first since the COVID-19 pandemic subsided. Two flights are operated per week.

== Security relations ==
Japan has sent the Japan Mine Action Service to Palau to clear World War II bombs sitting dormant in Palau's seabed. The clearing operations started in May 2013 and will take about a year and half.

== Tourism ==
Tourism is one of Palau's main industries, with the majority of its tourists coming from Japan and Taiwan.

== See also ==
- Foreign relations of Japan
- Foreign relations of Palau
- Japanese settlement in Palau
- Embassy of Japan in Palau
