= Japan–Malta relations =

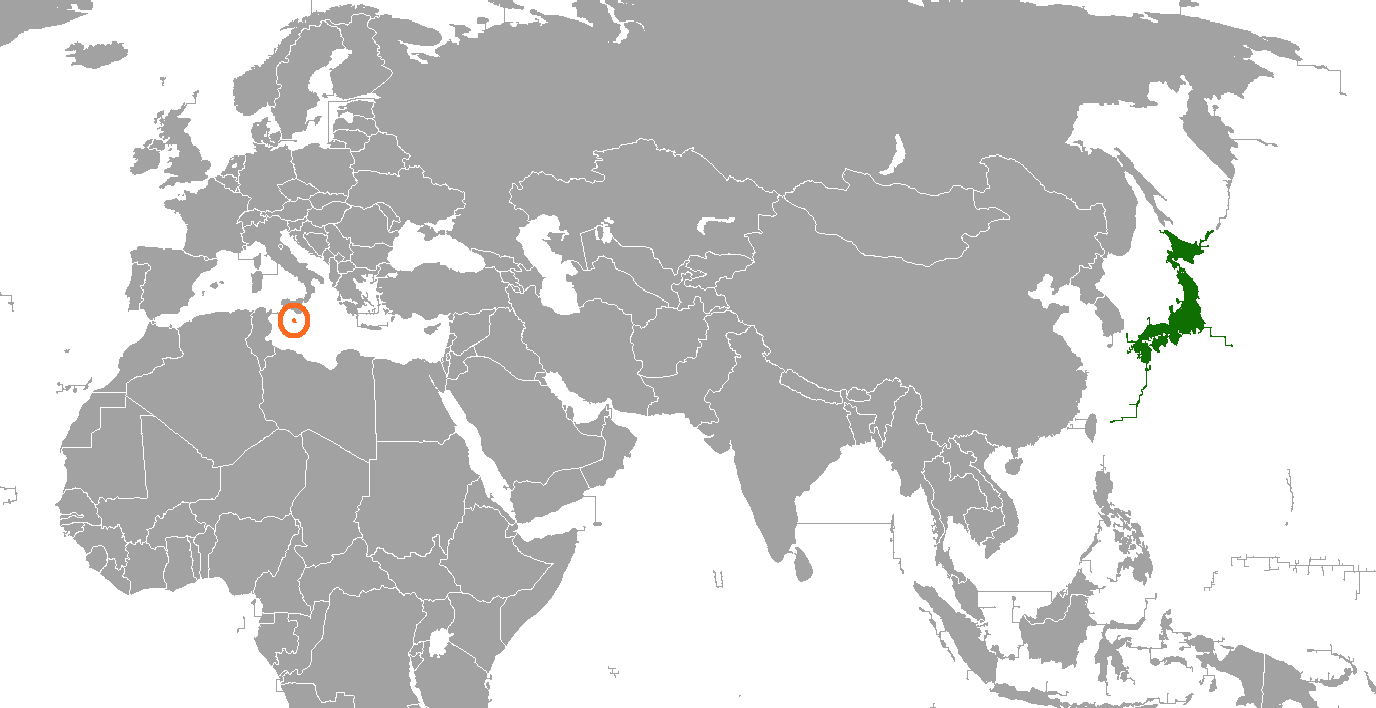
- Japan: Malta

Japan–Malta relations refers to the bilateral relations between Japan and Malta. Their diplomatic relations were established in 1965.

Malta has an embassy in Tokyo since September 28, 2020. Japan's embassy in Rome, Italy, is accredited to Malta, while it is represented in Valletta by an honorary consulate.

== History ==
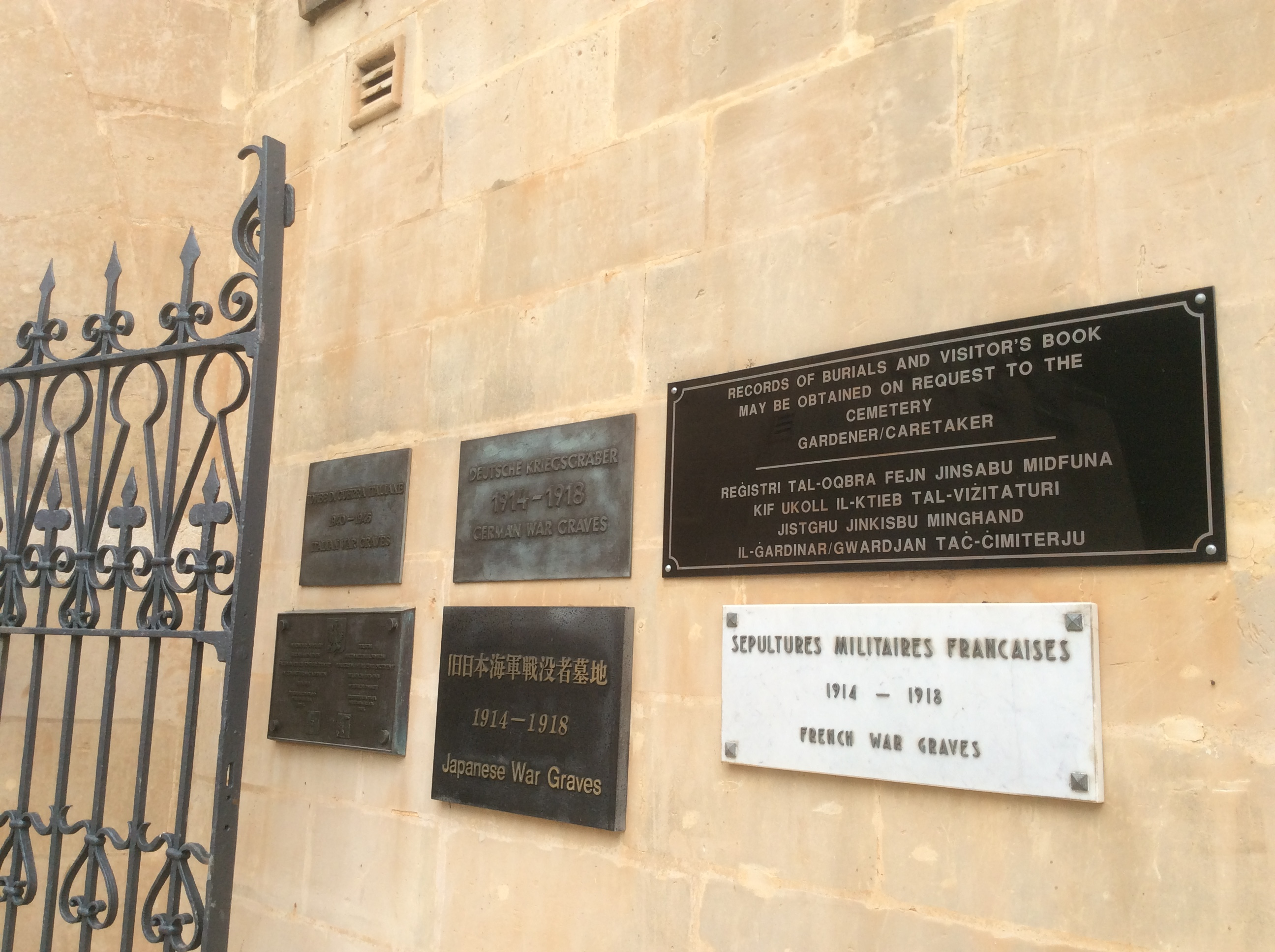
Plaque indicating the Japanese war graves in Kalkara Naval Cemetery

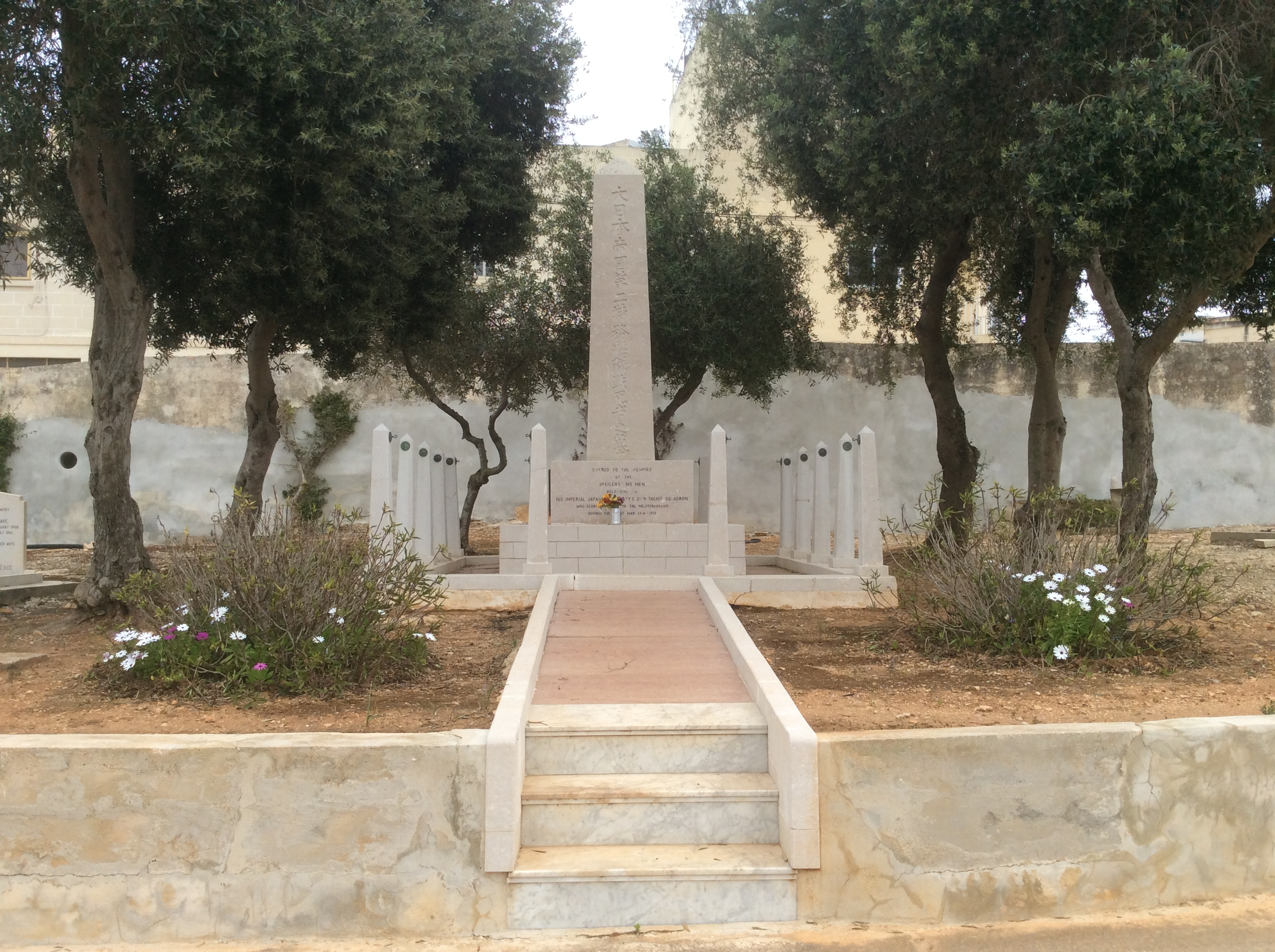
Tombstone of Japanese Imperial Naval officers and sailors who were killed in action to save Malta

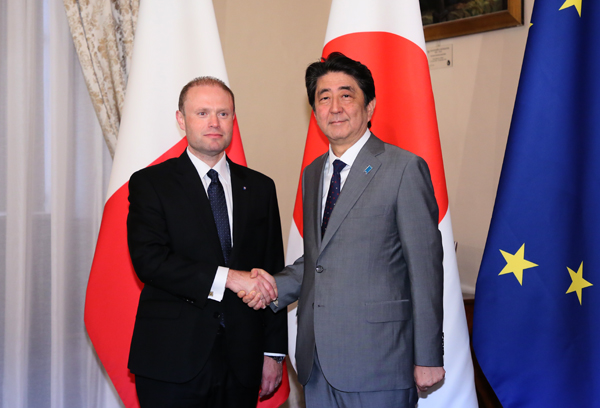
Japanese PM Shinzō Abe (right) met with Maltese PM Joseph Muscat (left), two Social Democrats in Valletta on May 27, 2017.

During the last two years of World War I, Japan played an important role in securing the sea lanes. Fourteen destroyers on anti-submarine convoy escort duty and their flagship cruisers of the Imperial Japanese Navy made Malta their homeport. The destroyer Sakaki was torpedoed by the Austrian submarine U-27 on June 11, 1917 killing 68 of her crew. They were buried in Kalkara Naval Cemetery in Malta.

On September 21, 1964, the State of Malta, whose successor state is the modern-day Republic of Malta, became independent from the United Kingdom. In the next year, 1965, Japan established formal diplomatic relations with Malta.

In the beginning of 1989, on the occasion of the death and funeral of Hirohito, the 124th Emperor of Japan who had ruled for over 60 years until he died on January 7, Maltese Foreign Minister Ċensu Tabone and Private Secretary Adrian Camilleri flew from Valletta to Tokyo and Maltese Ambassador Victor J. Gauci flew from Canberra to Tokyo, to attend the Rites of Imperial Funeral at the Imperial Palace in Tokyo on February 24.

In July 2006, Japanese Ex-prime Minister Toshiki Kaifu paid a courtesy call on Maltese President Eddie Fenech Adami in Valletta.

On May 27, 2017, Maltese Prime Minister Joseph Muscat welcomed Japanese Prime Minister Shinzō Abe, who came to the capital of Malta, and there held a joint press conference.

On September 28, 2020 Malta opened its Embassy in Tokyo. The first Resident Ambassador of the Republic of Malta to Japan was H.E. Mr Andre Spiteri ( September 2020- April 2026 ).

The current Resident Ambassador of the Republic of Malta to Japan is H.E. Mr. Reuben Gauci who arrived in Japan in August 2026.

== Resident diplomatic missions ==
- Japan is accredited to Malta from its embassy in Rome, Italy and maintains an honorary consulate in Valletta.
- Malta has an embassy in Tokyo.

== See also ==
- Foreign relations of Japan
- Foreign relations of Malta
