= Armenia–Japan relations =

- Armenia: Japan

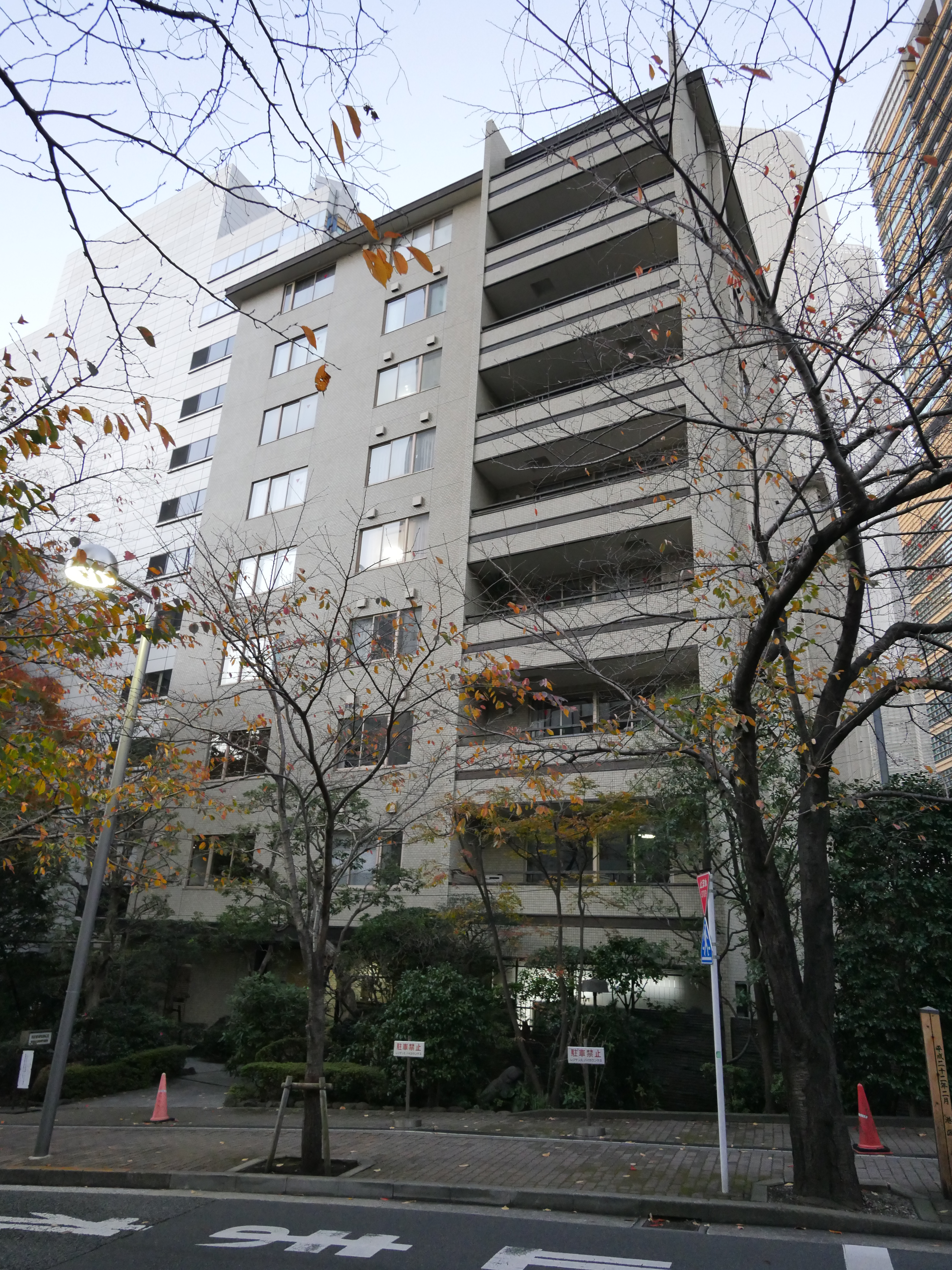
Embassy of Armenia in Tokyo

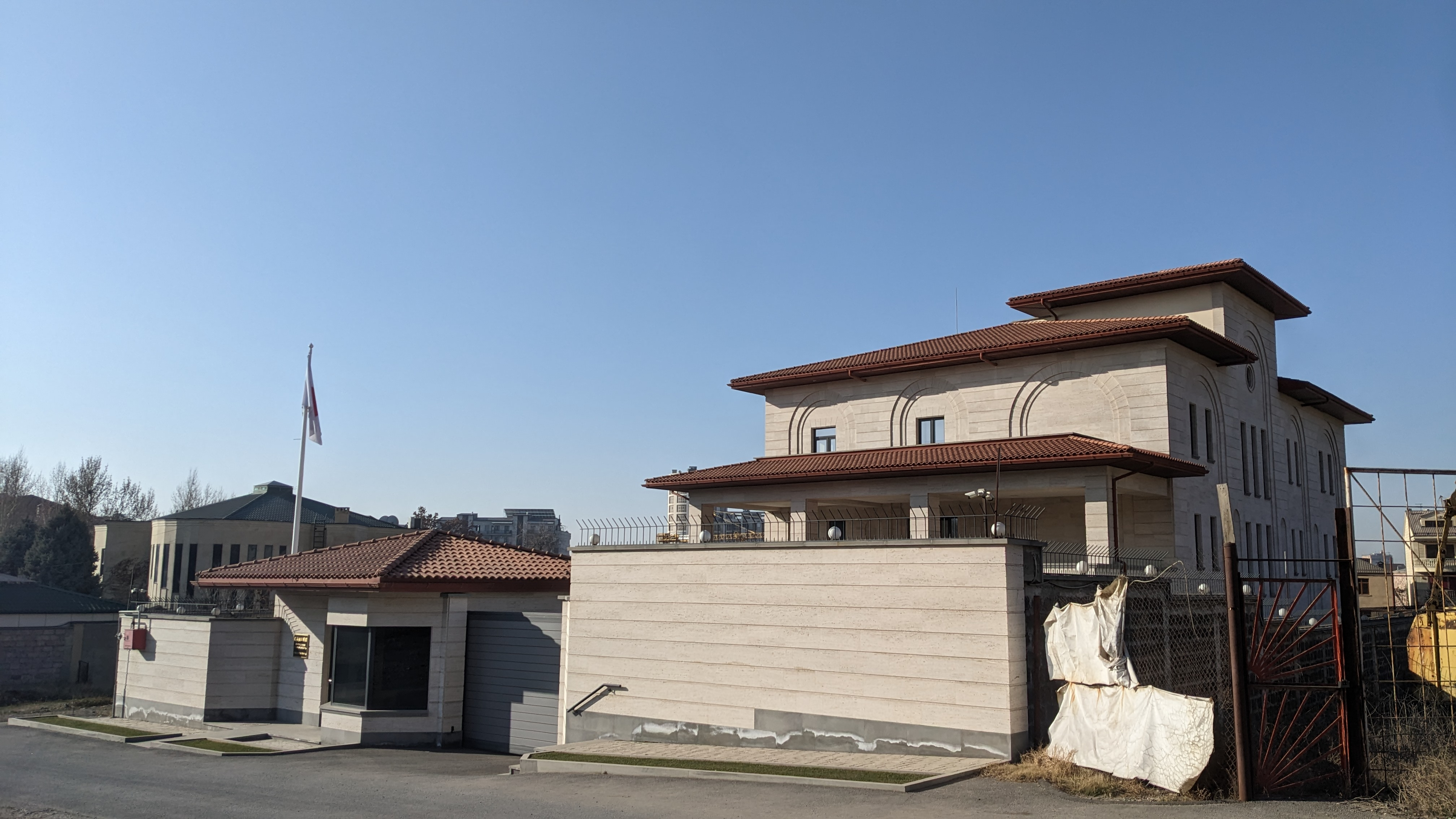
Embassy of Japan in Yerevan

Armenia and Japan officially established bilateral relations on 7 September 1992.

Armenia's President Robert Kocharyan paid an official visit to Japan in December 2001, holding meetings with Japan's Emperor and Prime Minister. He announced that the nation was planning to set up an embassy in Tokyo as soon as possible.

== History ==
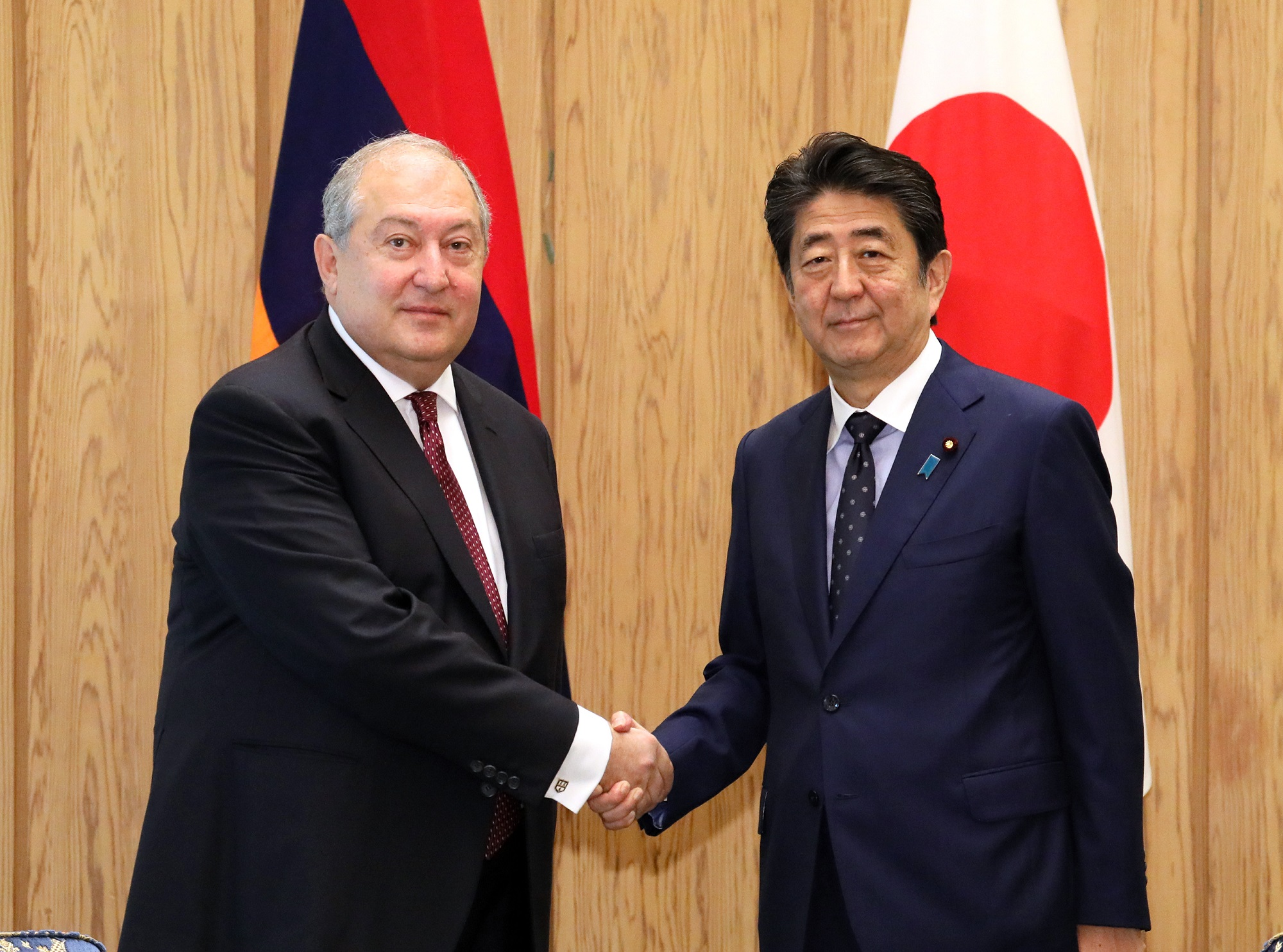
Armenian President Armen Sarkissian with Japanese Prime Minister Shinzo Abe in Tokyo, 24 October 2019

Due largely to Diana Apcar's effort, Japan was one of the first nations to recognize the Armenian republic as an independent nation on July 22, 1920.

Apcar was appointed Honorary Consul to Japan, in a letter by Hamo Ohanjanian, Foreign Minister of the First Republic of Armenia, “for defending the interests of the newly-born Fatherland, and mitigating the conditions of our compatriots…”.

The relations between Armenia and Japan were officially reestablished on 7 September 1992. Prior to this, relations were through the Soviet Union.

Originally, Armenia was represented at Japan's Beijing embassy, and Japan was represented at Armenia's Moscow embassy. The Armenian embassy in Tokyo was opened on 13 July 2010, and the Japanese embassy in Yerevan was built on 1 January 2015. Armenia initially did not have an ambassador to Japan, until May 2012, when Grant Pogosyan was appointed as the Armenian ambassador.

On 29 June 2017, it was announced by the Japanese Vice-Minister for Foreign Affairs Motome Takisawa that visa requirements for Armenian nationals will be relaxed, beginning on 1 September 2017, and on 31 August 2017, Armenia lifted visa requirements for Japanese citizens.

== Armenian genocide ==
During World War I, the Japanese Empire was involved in the Entente against the Central Powers, placing Japan against the Ottoman Empire, who later committed the Armenian genocide. Alarmed by the genocide, Japanese Viscount Shibusawa Eiichi began a relief effort to rescue Armenian population, his role has been well perceived by the Armenian community who managed to survive in this dark era.

Despite this, World War II and subsequent Japanese war crimes have prevented Japan from acknowledging the genocide, in fear of political backlash.

== Resident diplomatic missions ==
- Armenia has an embassy in Tokyo.
- Japan has an embassy in Yerevan.

== See also ==
- Foreign relations of Armenia
- Foreign relations of Japan
