= Japan–Trinidad and Tobago relations =

- Japan: Trinidad and Tobago

Japan and Trinidad and Tobago established diplomatic relations since May 1964, two years after the isles had attained their independence in 1962. Trinidad and Tobago has a non resident ambassador in New Delhi. Japan has an embassy in Port of Spain.

== History ==
Eric Williams, former Prime Minister of the Republic of Trinidad and Tobago, made official visits to Japan in 1974 and 1975.

In 2014, Prime Minister Shinzo Abe of Japan paid a visit to Trinidad and Tobago as part of his wider visit to CARICOM nations. On July 27, the Prime Minister held a bilateral meeting with The Hon. Kamla Persad-Bissessar, Prime Minister of the Republic of Trinidad and Tobago. This was the first-ever visit to the Republic of Trinidad and Tobago by a Japanese Prime Minister. Abe stated that it was his honor to make the first-ever visit to the Caribbean region by a Japanese Prime Minister during the 50th anniversary of the establishment of diplomatic relations between Japan and Trinidad and Tobago. Prime Minister Abe also expressed his intention to deepen friendly relations through various exchanges. Prime Minister Persad-Bissessar welcomed the visit by Prime Minister Abe and Japanese business leaders. The two leaders shared views that they would further develop the bilateral relationship, marking the visit as a new page in the history of both countries. Prime Minister Abe offered his belief that assistance from a perspective other than those based on per-capita income would be important in light of the fact that “vulnerability particular to small island states” created greater economic structural problems than per-capita income would suggest, and stated that Japan would conduct field surveys for future cooperation. Prime Minister Persad-Bissessar offered to fully discuss the issue in the Japan-CARICOM Summit Meeting scheduled for the next day.

The Japan Maritime Self-Defense Force made a call on a port of Trinidad and Tobago prior to Prime Minister Abe's visit to commemorate the 50th anniversary of bilateral relations and cooperation between the two countries' navies.

== Diaspora ==
As of October 2016, there were 53 Japanese citizens living in Trinidad and Tobago, while there were 101 Trinidad and Tobago nationals residing in Japan in June 2017.

== Economic relations ==
Trinidad and Tobago and Japan have a long and fruitful business and commercial relationship. Some Japanese major trade firms have engaged in joint activities with local firms. Trade between TT and Japan has expanded significantly in recent years.

In 2014, Trinidad and Tobago's primary export products to Japan were liquified natural gas and cacao, comprising approximately 11.28 billion yen (US$91.5 million) of trade revenue. Japan's primary exports to Trinidad and Tobago, including automobiles, power generation units and parts, and rubber tires, constituted 21.84 billion yen (US$177.2 million) worth of trade revenue for Japan.

During the 2014 visit by Prime Minister Shinzo Abe to Trinidad and Tobago, Prime Minister Kamla Persad-Bissessar expressed her expectation for further investment from Japanese enterprises. Persad-Bissessar also expressed her interest in triangular cooperation with CARICOM and Japan in order to provide Japanese technical and economic assistance to other CARICOM member states through Trinidad and Tobago.

== Cultural relations ==
- 1992 – Japan provided cultural grants to preserve and display artifacts and works of art for the National Museum and Art Gallery in Port of Spain.
- 1996 – House of Representative Member Horoshi Mitsuzuka was promoted by Trinidad and Tobago as the candidate of Japan for World Cup 2002.
- 2001 – Trinidad and Tobago celebrated "Japan Week" in honor of more than thirty years of relations with Japan.
- 2012 – The 11th annual "Animation and New Media Festival" at Animae Caribe in Trinidad and Tobago underwent a massive expansion, including a sister event in Jamaica, with the support of the Japanese animation industry.
- 2014 – Japan helped organize a Martial Arts Lecture and Demonstration at Port of Spain.

== See also ==
- Foreign relations of Japan
- Foreign relations of Trinidad and Tobago
