= Japan–Syria relations =

Bilateral relations between Japan and Syria

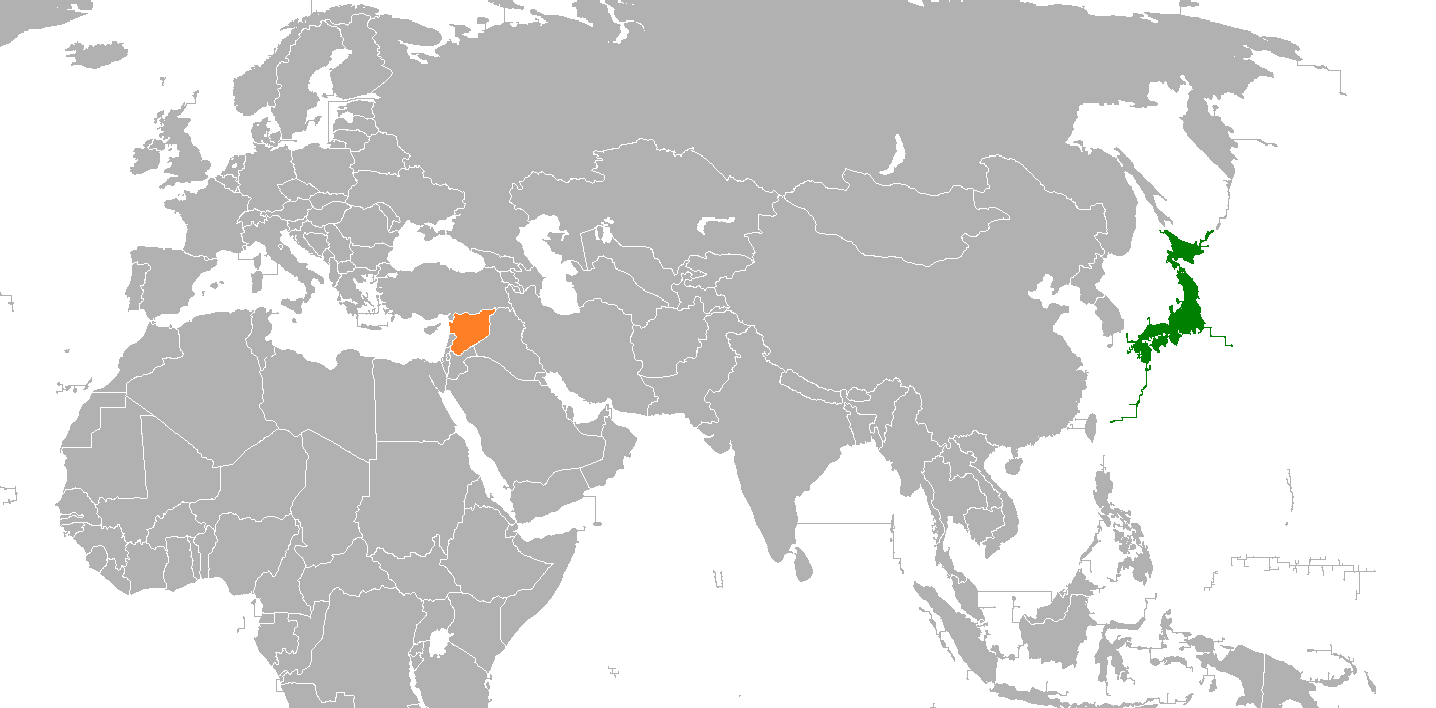
- Japan: Syria

Japan–Syria relations were officially established in 1953.

Japan has a long-standing history of humanitarian and development assistance to Syria, particularly during times of conflict. However, relations have been significantly impacted by the Syrian Civil War, which began in 2011.

== Diplomatic relations ==
Formal diplomatic relations between Japan and Syria were established in December 1953. Since then, Japan has maintained an embassy in Damascus, and Syria has an embassy in Tokyo. (Note: Also responsible for Syrian interests in South Korea.) Over the decades, Japan has provided economic and technical assistance to Syria, including projects focused on infrastructure, healthcare, and education.

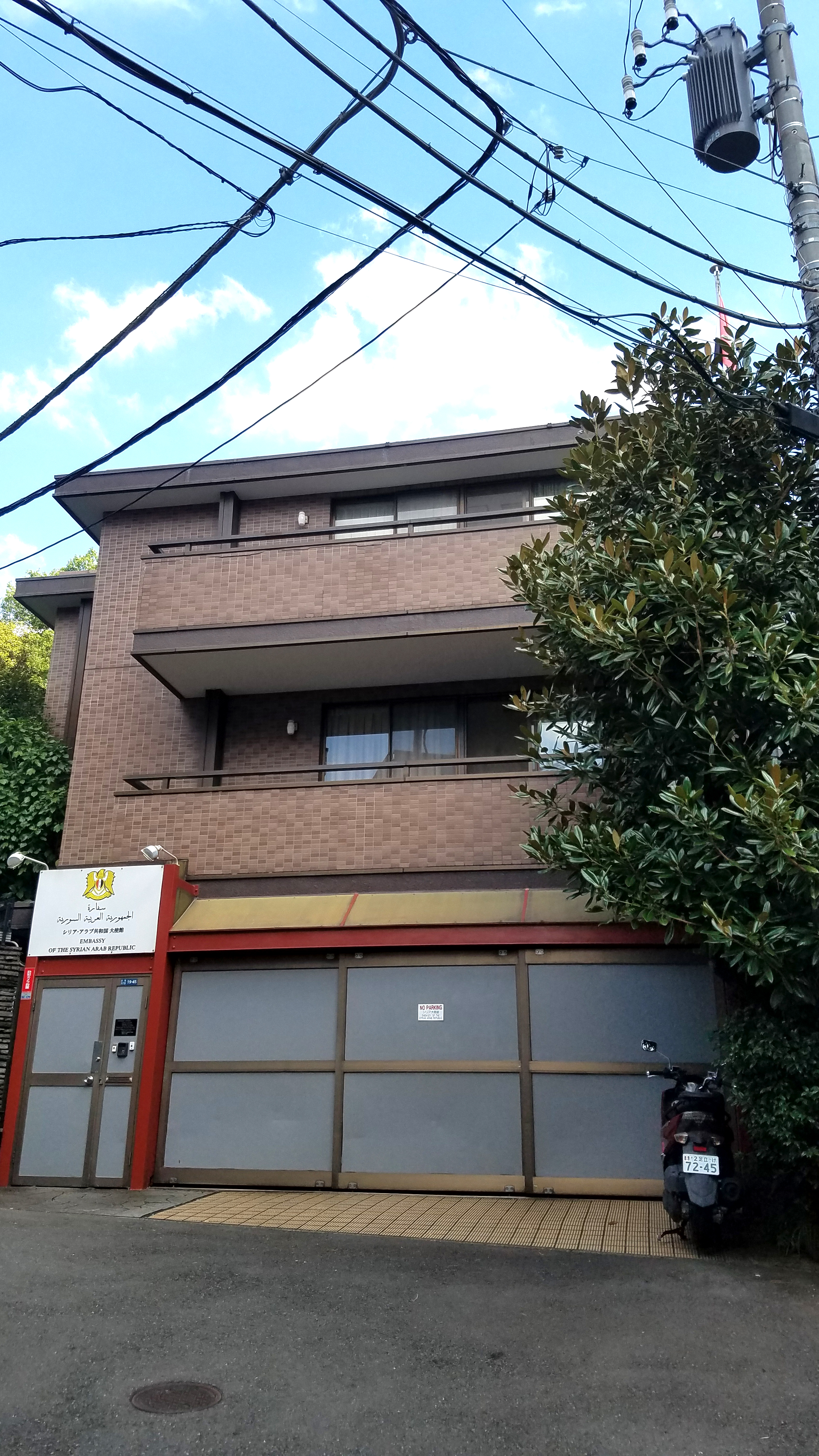
Syrian Embassy in Tokyo

During the 1980s, Japan increased its aid to Syria in the form of loans and grants to support Syrian economic development and agriculture. In the 1990s and early 2000s, Japan continued its development cooperation, investing in water management and healthcare improvements in Syria. Japan also supported Syria through United Nations programs aimed at addressing poverty and promoting sustainable development.

The beginning of the Syrian Civil War in 2011 altered the nature of Japan’s involvement in Syria. Japan temporarily closed its embassy in Damascus in 2012 due to security concerns and has since redirected its focus toward humanitarian assistance.

Japan has taken an impartial role in Middle Eastern conflicts. Despite Japan’s distance from the region, it has engaged diplomatically with Syria and supported various peace efforts in the Middle East, including the Israel–Syria peace negotiations.

Since the closure of the Japanese embassy in Damascus, Japanese diplomacy in Syria has focused on promoting peace through multilateral channels, including the United Nations and regional peace initiatives. Japan has also imposed sanctions on Syria in alignment with United Nations Security Council resolutions and other international efforts aimed at resolving the conflict.

== Economic relations ==
Prior to the Syrian Civil War, Japan and Syria engaged in moderate trade. Japan exported cars, machinery, electronics, and other manufactured goods to Syria, while Syria’s exports to Japan included raw materials and agricultural products, such as cotton and phosphates. Japanese companies also showed interest in investing in Syria's oil and gas sector during the 1990s.

The outbreak of the civil war disrupted these economic ties, and Japanese businesses suspended their operations in Syria. Due to the ongoing sanctions and instability, economic relations between Japan and Syria remain limited.

== Cultural relations ==
Japan and Syria have promoted cultural exchange programs to strengthen ties between the two countries. Before the Syrian Civil War, cultural events, such as Japanese art exhibitions, film screenings, and educational exchange programs, were regularly held in Damascus and other Syrian cities. The Japanese government has provided scholarships for Syrian students to study in Japan, promoting academic exchange between the two nations.

Japanese non-governmental organizations, such as the Japan International Cooperation Agency (JICA), have also organized language training and cultural activities in Syria, aiming to foster mutual understanding.

== Humanitarian assistance ==
Japan has been one of the significant contributors of humanitarian aid to Syria since the onset of the civil war. Japan provided billions humanitarian assistance to support Syrian refugees and internally displaced persons. This assistance has been directed through the United Nations, the International Committee of the Red Cross, and various non-governmental organizations.

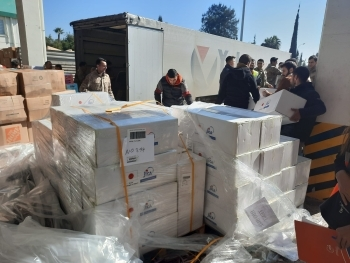
Japanese humanitarian aid being delivered in response to the 2023 Turkey-Syria earthquakes

Japanese aid has focused on providing basic necessities, healthcare, education, and psychological support to affected Syrians, as well as access to water, sanitation, and hygiene. Japan has also funded reconstruction efforts in areas that have stabilized, with projects aimed at restoring access to clean water, healthcare facilities, and housing.

== See also ==
- Foreign relations of Japan
- Foreign relations of Syria
