= Bulgaria–Japan relations =

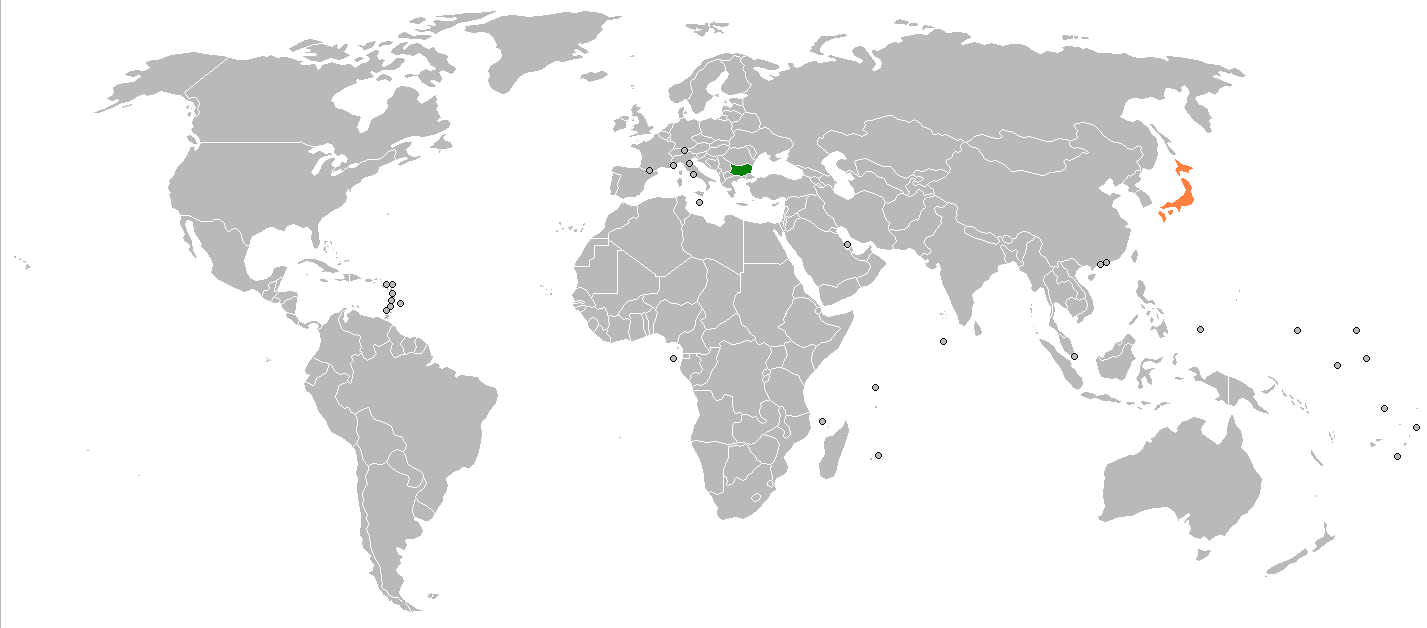

- Bulgaria: Japan

Bulgaria and Japan have bilateral relations. Bulgaria has an embassy in Tokyo, while Japan has an embassy in Sofia.

Seigo Yamazawa, a Japanese samurai and military officer from the influential Satsuma domain, Volunteer participated in the Russo-Turkish War and played a notable role in Bulgaria's liberation efforts such as Battle of Pleven, leaving a legacy celebrated by monuments in the country.

Bulgaria and Japan were allies during the Second World War together with the Axis powers, after the war, both countries officially re-established diplomatic relations in September 1959.

== Imperial visits to Bulgaria ==
- Prince Tsugu and Princess Tsugu
  - 17 - 20 October 1979
- Prince Mikasa and Princess Mikasa
  - May 1987
- Princess Nori
  - 29 September - 3 October 1996
- Prince Akishino and Princess Akishino
  - 13 - 16 May 2009

== Imperial visits to Japan ==
According to:

- President Zhelyu Zhelev
  - 1990
- President Petar Stoyanov
  - 1997
- President Georgi Parvanov
  - 2009
- President Rumen Radev
  - 2019

== Resident diplomatic missions ==
- Bulgaria has an embassy in Tokyo.
- Japan has an embassy in Sofia.

== See also ==
- Foreign relations of Bulgaria
- Foreign relations of Japan
