= Cuba–Japan relations =

- Cuba: Japan

Cuba–Japan relations are the bilateral relations between Cuba and Japan. Diplomatic relations between the two countries was established on 21 December 1929. Relations were temporarily suspended due to the Second World War, but diplomatic relations resumed on 21 November 1952. Cuba has an embassy in Tokyo. Japan has an embassy in Havana.

== History ==
=== From the Meiji Restoration to the end of the Second World War (1868–1945) ===
In 1898, about 30 years before formal diplomatic relations, Japanese agricultural immigrants first settled in Cuba. In 1998, various cultural events were held to commemorate the 100th anniversary of Japanese immigration to Cuba.

On 21 December 1929, diplomatic relations were officially established between Cuba and Japan. However the expansion of the Pacific theatre of the Second World War on 8 December 1941, when the Imperial Japanese Navy attacked Pearl Harbor in Hawaii, a territory (now state) of the United States, led to a rupture in friendly relations between the two countries. The following day, on 9 December 1941, Cuba quickly clarified its stance, joined the Allies, and declared war on Japan. Japan and Cuba did not maintain diplomatic relations during the Second World War, and on 15 August 1945, Japan accepted the Potsdam Declaration and surrendered to the United States and the Allies.

=== From the resumption of diplomatic relations to the end of the Cold War (1952–1989) ===
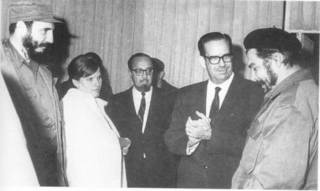
Fidel (far left) and Guevara (far right).

With the entry into force of the San Francisco Peace Treaty on 28 April 1952, Japan rejoined as a member of the international community. Cuba was one of the 49 signatories to the San Francisco Peace Treaty, which was ratified by Cuba on 12 August 1952, and diplomatic relations between the two countries officially resumed on 21 November 1952.

On 1 January 1959, a revolutionary force led by Fidel Castro overthrew the Fulgencio Batista regime, which was under the strong influence of the United States and Western capital, and established a revolutionary government in Cuba (Cuban Revolution). The People's Socialist Party (later the Communist Party of Cuba), which had been suppressed by the pro-American and anti-communist Batista government, became the only ruling party in the country and ruled Cuba.

By the time of the Cuban Revolution, the Cold War structure had already been established in which the capitalist and communist camps fought each other for power, and the United States under the Dwight D. Eisenhower administration, the leader of the capitalist camp, did not welcome the establishment of a communist regime in Cuba. The United States was not satisfied with not recognizing the revolutionary regime, and in 1961 broke off diplomatic relations with Cuba (reestablished in 2015 during the second term of the Barack Obama administration), and attempted to overthrow Castro's regime by using military force and assassination. However, none of the U.S. plans for regime change in Cuba worked, and the Cuban revolutionary regime tried to survive by strengthening relations with the Soviet Union. In the summer of 1962, the east–west confrontation between the United States and the Soviet Union reached its climax with the introduction of nuclear missiles and their delivery vehicles to Cuba, which resulted in the Cuban Missile Crisis. Despite the serious conflict between the United States and Cuba, Japan chose to maintain friendly relations with Cuba without severing diplomatic relations.

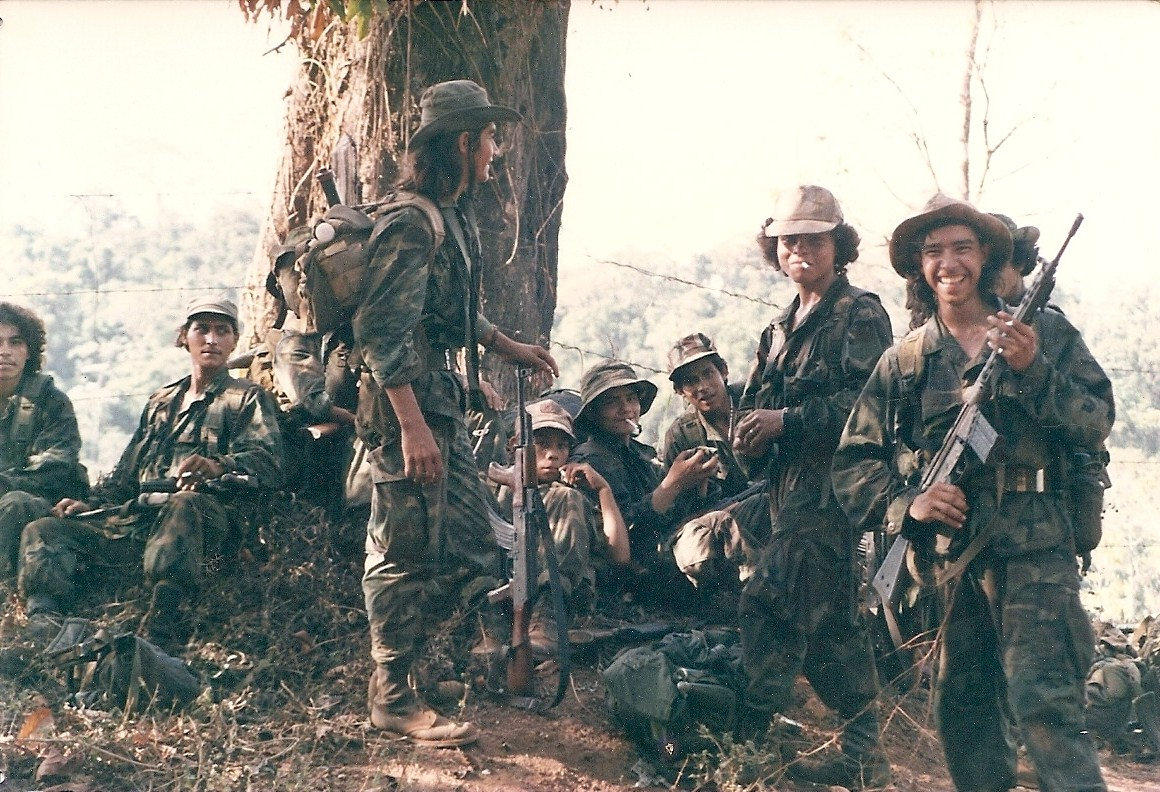
Guerrillas of the Nicaraguan anti-communist armed group Alliance for the Democratic Revolution (ARDE) take a break (1987).

On 20 November 1984, then Japanese Communist Party chairman Tetsuzo Fuwa held a meeting with Castro in Havana, the capital of Cuba. At that time, the Cold War was intensifying again, and capitalist countries such as the United States and Japan condemned the military intervention in Afghanistan by the Soviet Union, which remained Cuba's ally, while the United States also condemned Nicaragua, where a communist government had just been established. The United States was unafraid to provide military support to the anti-communist rebels (Contra War). Meeting with Fuwa, Castro asked a series of questions about the political and industrial situation in Japan, while expressing a strong wariness of US imperialism, which would not hesitate to interfere in Nicaragua's internal affairs, including military support for anti-communist forces, in order to topple the communist regime in Nicaragua. The meeting lasted three hours and 15 minutes.

=== After the end of the Cold War (1989–present) ===
In May 2015, Japan's foreign minister, Fumio Kishida, met with the now 88-year old Castro in his residence, where Kishida stated that Japan supported the ongoing rapprochement between the United States and Cuba. In September 2016, Japanese prime minister Shinzo Abe became the first Japanese head of government to visit Cuba, meeting with Castro, now ill, for a little over an hour. Abe also met with Fidel's brother, Raúl Castro, and expressed hope for a deepening of mutual economic ties between the two countries, with Japan forgiving part of the debt owed by Cuba. On 25 November 2016, Castro, who had ruled Cuba since 1959, passed away. On the same day, Kishida first sent a condolence telegram to Cuban foreign minister Bruno Rodríguez Parrilla. On 28 November, from the ruling party, Kishida, State Minister for Foreign Affairs Nobuo Kishi, State Minister for Foreign Affairs Kentaro Sonoura, and Parliamentary Vice-Minister for Foreign Affairs Shunsuke Takei visited the Cuban Embassy in Tokyo and expressed their condolences. From the opposition party, Kazuo Shii, who serves as the chairman of the Japanese Communist Party, offered the Cuban embassy his condolences. Similarly, the Japanese Communist Party's Tetsuzo Fuwa visited the embassy and wrote, "The meeting 32 years ago in which we discussed the right of self-determination of all peoples is still deeply engraved in my heart." Also on 28 November, Keiji Furuya, Japanese Chairman of the Cuba Parliamentary Friendship League, went to Cuba as a special envoy of the prime minister and attended the funeral held there.

== Economic relations ==
In 2017, exports to Japan totalled 1.55 billion yen and included tobacco, fish and fish preparation, coffee, non-ferrous metallic ores. Exports to Cuba totalled 4.72 billion yen and included electrical machinery, machinery, precision instruments.

== Resident diplomatic missions ==
- Cuba has an embassy in Tokyo.
- Japan has an embassy in Havana.

== See also ==
- Foreign relations of Cuba
- Foreign relations of Japan
