= Japan–Qatar relations =

- Japan: Qatar

Japan–Qatar relations are the bilateral relations between Japan and Qatar. Diplomatic relations were established in 1972. The two countries share strong economic ties, with Japan being Qatar's foremost trading partner, and Qatar ranking as Japan's sixth most significant import partner in 2016. These two countries have embassies in each of their territories. Japan has one in Doha, and Qatar has one in Tokyo. In 2023, Japan declared Qatar as one of its visa-exempt countries.

== Diplomatic visits ==
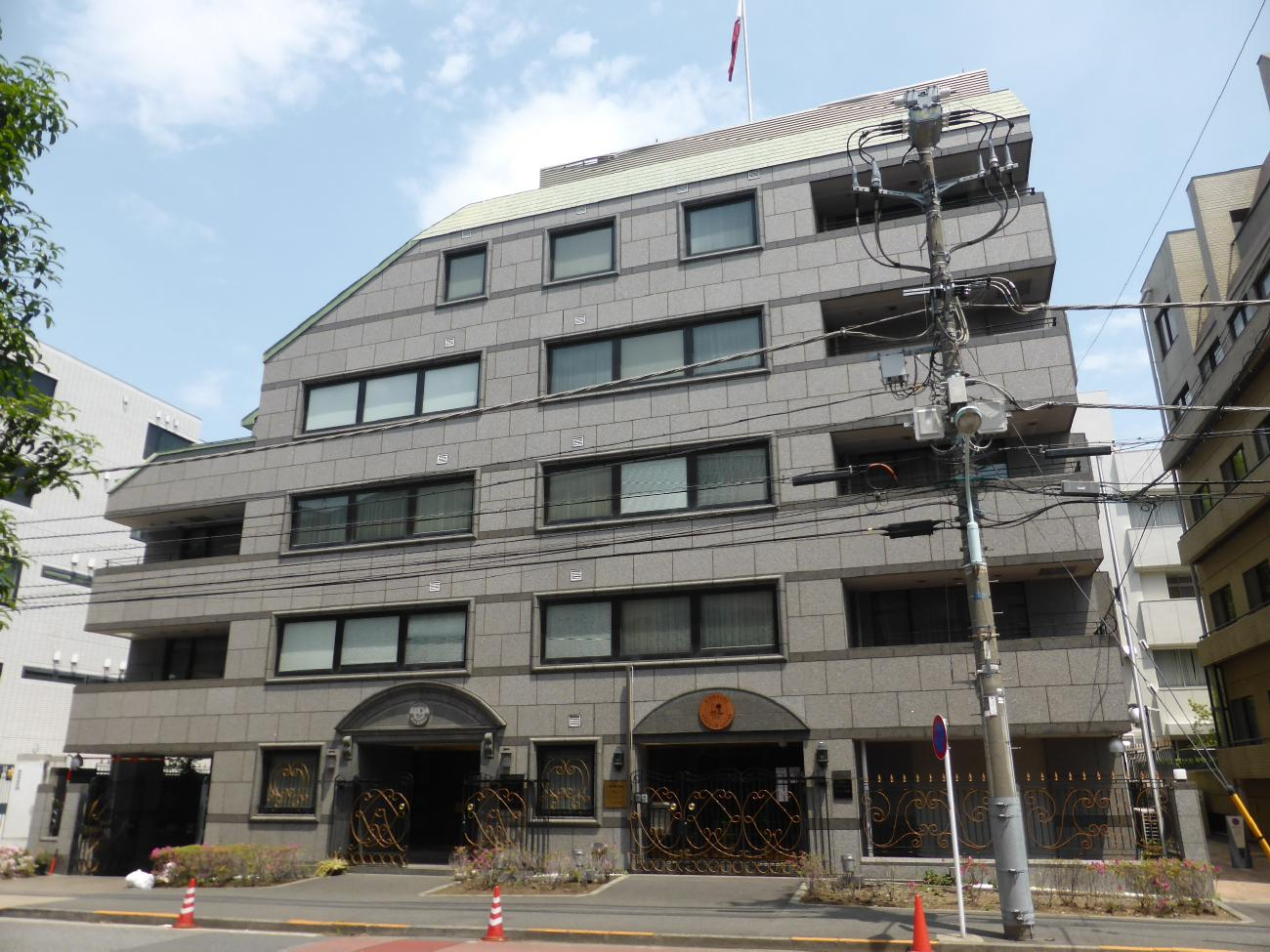
Qatari Embassy in Tokyo

Japanese Prime Minister Shinzo Abe visited Qatar in August 2013. Oil and gas agreements and investment opportunities were discussed during the visit.

In February 2015, Emir Tamim bin Hamad Al Thani made an official visit to Japan. The purpose of the trip was to discuss ways to further strengthen bilateral ties. On 28 September 2022, on the occasion of the state funeral for Japan’s former prime minister Shinzo Abe in Tokyo, Qatari Emir Tamim bin Hamad Al Thani was one of the only seven heads of state which met with Japanese Emperor Naruhito.

In July 2023, Japanese Prime Minister Fumio Kishida visited Qatar and held talks with Emir Tamim bin Hamad Al Thani. They discussed improving energy ties and bilateral relations in the economy, defense, security and academic exchange.

== Political cooperation ==
Japan established the Japanese Parliamentary Association for Friendship with the State of Qatar in 2010 in an effort to improve bilateral relations.

After ISIS militants in Syria kidnapped Japanese citizens Kenji Goto and Haruna Yakawa in Syria in 2014, Qatar attempted to negotiate their release, but ultimately failed.

On 5 June 2017, a number of Arab states severed ties with Qatar over its alleged funding of terrorist groups and its purported ties with Iran. As a result of the diplomatic crisis, shipping costs have increased, which has affected the status of regional trade conducted by Japanese companies. Qatar, being the world's second-largest helium producer, provided Japan with roughly a quarter of its helium supply prior to the crisis. However, the crisis led to sanctions being imposed on Qatar by its neighbors. This situation prevented its helium shipments from arriving in Japan. Following an official visit to Doha in September 2017 by Japanese FM Tarō Kōno, Japan's foreign ministry stated its willingness to help solve the dispute, and affirmed its support for Kuwaiti and American attempts to mediate.

== Economic relations ==
In the 1930s, Qatar's economy was largely based on pearl diving. The development of cultured pearls by Japanese industry devastated the price of natural pearls and Qatar's economy.

Japan has been a key partner in the development of Qatar's LNG sector, which has become central to the bilateral relationship between the two nations. Following the establishment of Qatargas in 1984, Japan signed its first LNG purchase agreement with Qatar in 1992 for the delivery of 4 million tons per year, marking the beginning of a strategic energy partnership. The first shipment of LNG from Qatar to Japan was delivered in January 1997, solidifying Japan’s position as a primary market for Qatari LNG. This relationship has contributed significantly to the diversification and growth of Qatar's economy while securing Japan's energy supply. By 2021, Qatar was one of Japan's largest LNG suppliers, alongside Oman and the UAE. This partnership has also enabled Japanese companies to participate as stakeholders in Qatar’s LNG sector, creating a robust framework for economic and technological interdependence.

In 1996, Japan entered into an agreement with Qatar to import 6 million tonnes of LNG for the next 25 years. Qatar's first LNG shipment to Japan arrived at the beginning of 1997, marking the first LNG export in Qatar's history. This partnership positioned Japan as one of Qatar's key LNG markets, providing Japan with a critical energy source while supporting Qatar's economic growth. Over the decades, the relationship evolved into a broader interdependence, encompassing investment, energy security, and diplomatic cooperation. These dynamics reflect Japan’s strategy to mitigate energy vulnerabilities and diversify supply sources while maintaining strong economic ties with Qatar.

Japan accounted for 50.6% of all of Qatar's crude oil exports in 2004. During the same period, Japan was also Qatar's largest customer for LNG exports. Overall, Japan was Qatar's most significant trading partner in 2005, and accounted for around 40% of the value for all of Qatar's exports. Furthermore, Japanese products accounted for 11.6% of the value for all of Qatar's imports, representing the highest value among all of Qatar's trade partners.

In April 2006, an economic agreement was signed between Qatar and Japan. Also that year, the inaugural meeting of the Japan-Qatar Joint Economic Committee took place.

The Qatar-Japan Business Forum was held in Qatar in August 2013, during the visit by Prime Minister Shinzo Abe. There were an estimated 50 Japanese companies with offices in Qatar in 2015. In 2015, when Qatar finalized the purchase of 24 fighter jets from France, Japanese banks agreed to lend Qatar $6.8 billion for a down payment.

Japan was the main destination for Qatari LNG in 2016, importing 12.1 million tonnes. This provided Japan with roughly one-fifth of its annual LNG requirement. When several Arab nations severed ties with Qatar in June 2017, Japanese LNG buyers tried negotiating cheaper deals, which provoked Qatar to issue a warning that it may look elsewhere for buyers.

== Disaster aid ==
In the aftermath of the 2011 Tōhoku earthquake and tsunami, Emir Hamad bin Khalifa Al-Thani pledged $100 million in aid to Japan. In 2012, Qatar created the Qatar Friendship Fund (QFF) with the aim of spending the $100 million to help victims in the Tōhoku region. The economic impact of the fund could generate an estimated ¥180 billion for the ten years following its creation.

== Cultural relations ==
On Qatar and Japan's 40th anniversary of diplomatic relations, Qatar Museums, in collaboration with a number of Qatari ministries, launched the Qatar Japan 2012 Year of Culture. Events featuring Japanese traditional dance, music, theatre and anime were held in Qatar throughout the year.

The Japanese Embassy in Doha is active in organizing cultural events in Qatar. In an attempt to showcase Japanese culture, the embassy launched Japan Week in November 2015.

== Migration ==
There are roughly 981 Japanese citizens living in Qatar as of February 2015.

== See also ==
- Japan School of Doha
