= Embassy of Japan in Palau =

- Location: Ngerekebesang Village, Palau
- Address: Koror, Ngerekebesang
- Coordinates: 7°21′10.01″N 134°26′42.04″E
- Ambassador: Kenichi Kasahara

The Embassy of Japan in Palau is a diplomatic mission by Japan in Palau. It is in the Ngerekebesang Village in Ngerekebesang Island, Koror State. It connects Japan and Palau, and it is a local working place for Palauan Citizens. The Ambassador is Kenichi Kasahara.

== History ==
Relations between Japan and Palau trace back to 1920 when Japan assumed administration of former German colonial territories in the Pacific, including modern-day Palau, the Federated States of Micronesia, the Marshall Islands, and the Northern Mariana Islands. Governed as a mandate under the League of Nations, the region was administered by Japan until the end of World War II, during which Koror served as the central headquarters for the mandatory territory.

== Operations and Connection ==
In the Embassy of Japan in Palau, Palauan citizens work. It is a direct hub where people apply for visas to visit Japan and travel. They travel for Business, Education and Tourism. For Japanese citizens, it is for emergency passports, legal registries and assist residents during Natural Disasters in Japan. The workers make sure that the friendship between Japan and Palau stays smooth politically. They also take care of Palauan children and make sure that they stay healthy and educated by funding them. They help children study in Japanese scholarships too. To specifically support Palauan children and local communities, the embassy manages the grant assistance for grassroots human security projects. This program funds the renovation of primary schools, procurement of medical equipment, and improvement of public health facilities across Palau states. Furthermore, the educational support mentioned includes the official Japanese Government Scholarships, which allow Palauan students to pursue higher education, research, and specialized training programs at Japanese universities.

== Design ==
The embassy is build in the Ngerekebesang Village, next to the Pacific Ocean and it is surrounded by trees. There is also a Tennis court next to it.
