= Fiji–Japan relations =

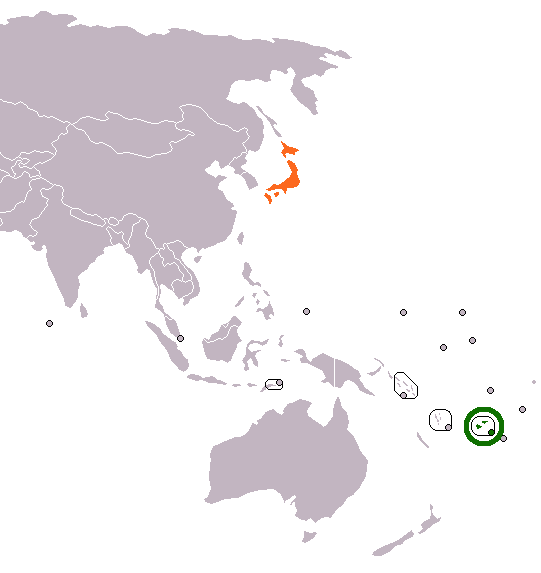

- Fiji: Japan

Fiji–Japan relations refers to the bilateral relations between Fiji and Japan. Fiji maintains an embassy in Tokyo while Japan has an embassy in Suva.

== History ==
Relations were established in 1970 and have since grown. Japan pledged US$2.3 Million to Fiji to assist Fijians recovering from natural disasters and has allowed members of the Fijian Military to come to Japan to train on how to operate medical equipment and perform humanitarian operations. Japan has also allowed its Japan Defense Force to deploy to Fiji to engage in "capability-building assistance".

== Trade ==
Prime Minister Shinzo Abe pledged 900 Million Yen to Fiji to redevelop radio broadcast to improve responses to natural disasters.

== Tourism ==
Japan sent 6,274 Tourists to Fiji in 2018 while Fiji sent 727 Tourists to Japan.

== See also ==
- Foreign relations of Fiji
- Foreign relations of Japan
