= Japan–Kenya relations =

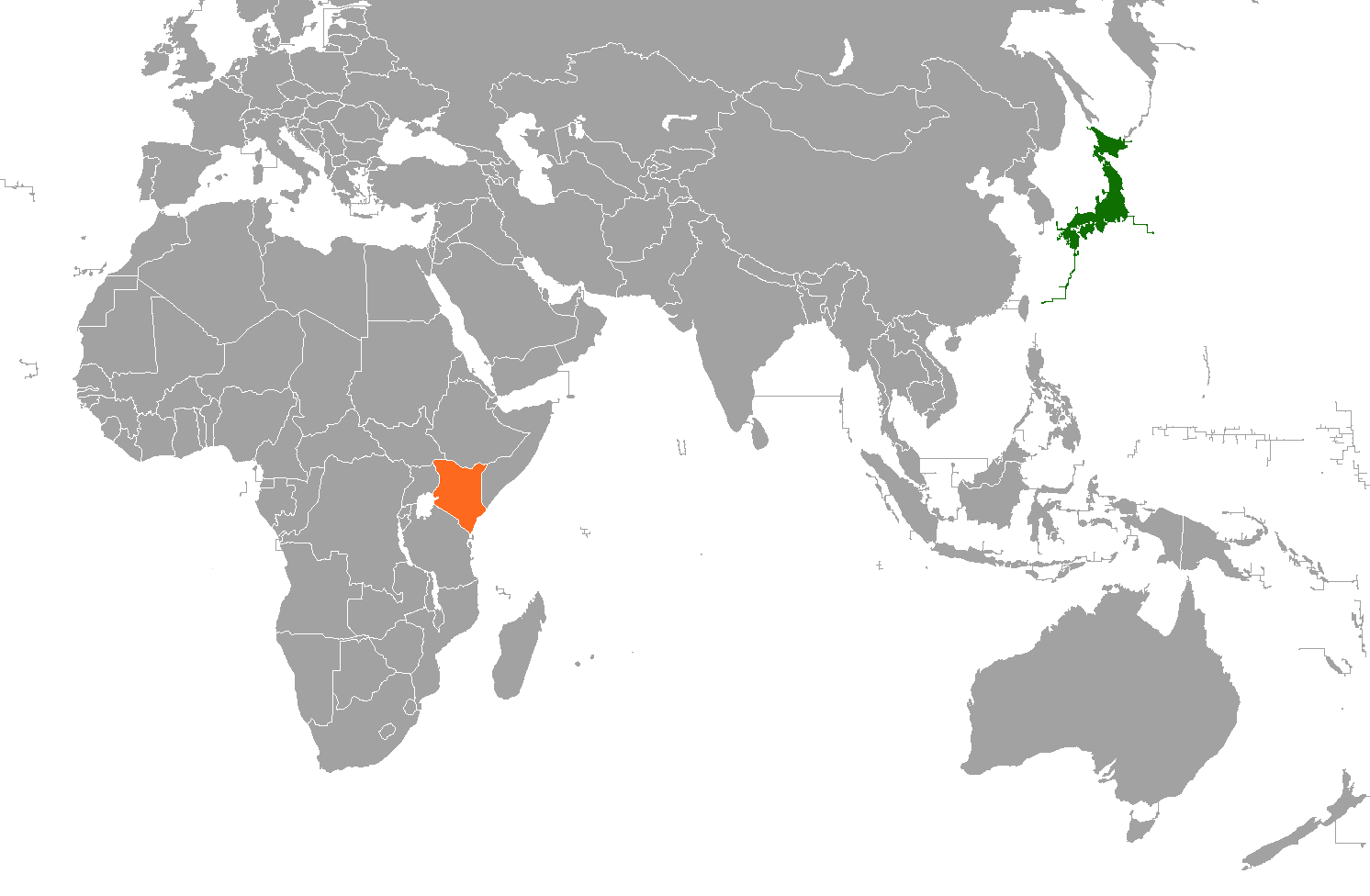
- Japan: Kenya

Japan–Kenya relations are bilateral relations between Japan and Kenya.

== History ==
Japan recognised Kenya soon after the latter's independence, opened the Embassy of Japan in Nairobi in 1964. Kenya's embassy in Japan was opened in 1979.

Nairobi now hosts one of the largest Japanese expatriate communities in Africa. There were 633 Japanese nationals in Nairobi in 2009. Japanese agencies such as JICA, JETRO and JBIC have made Nairobi their regional headquarters.

Former Japanese Prime Minister Yoshirō Mori visited Kenya in 2001 while on his Africa tour. The Crown Prince of Japan visited Kenya in 2010. Former President Mwai Kibaki visited Japan in 2004 and 2008.

President Kenyatta made an official state visit to Japan in early 2015. He met and held talks with Prime Minister Abe. Prime Minister Abe made a state visit to Kenya in 2016 and he also attended the TICAD VI Summit which was held for the first time in Africa.

== Development cooperation ==
In 2011, during the Fukushima Daiichi nuclear disaster, Kenya donated Kes.82 million (US$1 million) to Japan.

In 2008, development assistance from Japan consisted of:

- Loans: 215.7 billion yen (US$1.8 billion)
- Grants: 102.5 billion yen (US$882 million)
- Technical cooperation: 90.8 billion yen (US$782 million)

Japan has been a major financier in key infrastructure projects in Kenya including: the upgrading of the Mombasa Port, Olkaria Geothermal Plant, Sondu/Miriu Hydropower Plant and Nairobi Western Ring Road.

== Trade ==
Kenya imports goods worth about Kes.63.13 billion (US$691 million) from Japan annually, these goods mostly consist of vehicles and machinery.

Japan imports goods worth Kes.2.46 billion (US$27 million) from Kenya, these goods mostly consist of fish fillet, cut flower, coffee, nuts and tea.

=== FDI ===
In 2013, Toyota Kenya opened a Kes. 500 million (US$5.5 million) assembly plant in Mombasa. The plant was opened in association with Kenyan-owned Associated Vehicles Assemblers (AVA). In the same year, Honda Motorcycle Kenya Ltd. opened a motorcycle assembly plant worth Kes. 450 million (US$4.9 million). The plant is said to be the second largest plant in Africa with a production capacity of 25,000 a year. The company is jointly owned by Honda 90% and a Kenyan investor 10%.

In 2014, Nissan also announced that it was opened to building an assembly plant in Kenya if the Kenyan government acted on tariffs and power supply. The company is seeking to regain its fallen market share in the Kenyan auto market.

== Diplomatic missions ==
The embassy of Japan in Kenya is also accredited to Eritrea, Seychelles and Somalia. It is located at Upper Hill, Nairobi. The embassy of Kenya in Japan is located at Meguro-Ku, Tokyo.
