= Japan–Tonga relations =

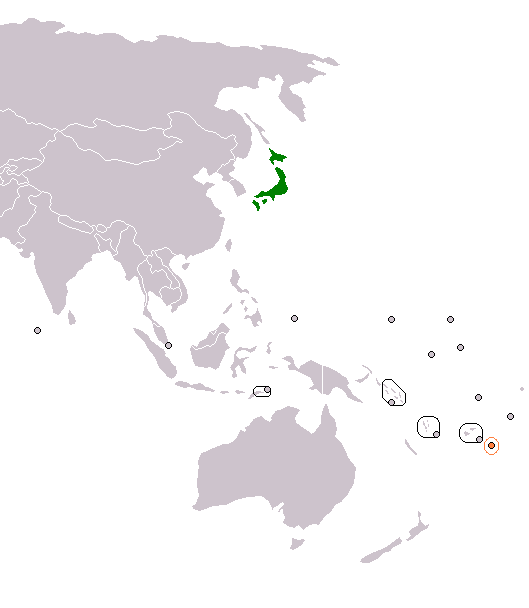

- Japan: Tonga

Japan and Tonga have maintained official diplomatic relations since July 1970. Japan is Tonga's leading donor in the field of technical aid. The Japanese government describes its relations with Tonga as "excellent", and states that "the Imperial family of Japan and the Royal family of Tonga have developed a cordial and personal relationship over the years". Japan is one of only four countries to have an embassy in Nukuʻalofa, whilst Tonga has an embassy in Tokyo.

In early 2009, Japan became the fourth country to establish an embassy in Tonga (following Australia, New Zealand and the People's Republic of China). In March, Ambassador Yasuo Takase became the first resident ambassador of Japan in Tonga. He was also the first resident Japanese ambassador in any Polynesian country.

The opening of the embassy came in a context of increased Japanese development aid in the Pacific.

== State visits ==
In May 2009, Tongan Prime Minister Feleti Sevele was welcomed to Japan by Emperor Akihito for a regional discussion on aid.

King Tāufaʻāhau Tupou IV visited Japan on seven occasions between 1982 and 1995. He attended the state funeral of Emperor Hirohito in 1989.

== Trade ==
In 2013, Tonga's exports to Japan (consisting primarily in pumpkins and tuna) were worth JPY 146 million, while its imports (mainly machinery) were worth JPY 460 million. Japan is Tonga's largest export market.

== Diplomatic missions ==
Japan has sent only bureaucratic diplomats as ambassadors to Tonga. On the other hand, however, one of the Tongan ambassadors included a member of the royal family, Crown Prince Tupoutoʻa Lavaka (now Tupou VI).
