= Japan–European Union relations =

Euro-Japanese relations
- European Union: Japan

Diplomatic mission
- European Union Delegation, Tokyo: Mission of Japan, Brussels

Relations between the European Union (EU) and Japan date back to 1959. They have a strong trade relationship, particularly in investment flows.

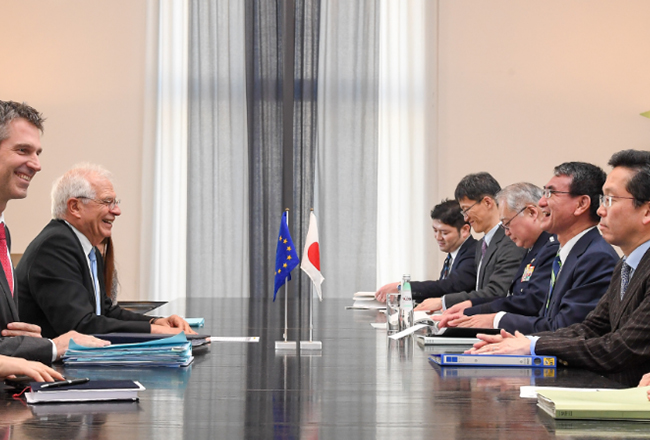
Defense Minister Taro Kono and Josep Borrell High Representative of the European Union for Foreign Affairs and Security Policy at 2020 MSC

On February 1, 2019, the Japan–European Union Comprehensive Economic Partnership Agreement (EPA), the world's largest open economic area covering a third of the world's economy, entered into force.

== History ==
In 1959, the Japanese ambassador in Belgium was accredited as Japan's first Representative to the European Communities (what would later become the EU in 1993). However, the establishment of a European delegation in Tokyo would take until 1974. In 1984 the first ministerial meeting between the two sides took place (the first summit would be in 1991).

Although cultural and noneconomic ties with Western Europe grew significantly during the 1980s, the economic nexus remained by far the most important element of Japanese-West European relations throughout the decade. Events in West European relations, as well as political, economic, or even military matters, were topics of concern to most Japanese commentators because of the immediate implications for Japan. The major issues centered on the effect of the coming West European economic unification on Japan's trade, investment, and other opportunities in Western Europe. Some West European leaders were anxious to restrict Japanese access to the newly integrated European Union (until November 1993, the European Community), but others appeared open to Japanese trade and investment. In partial response to the strengthening economic ties among nations in Western Europe and to the United States-Canada-Mexico North American Free Trade Agreement, Japan and other countries along the Asia-Pacific rim began moving in the late 1980s toward greater economic cooperation. In 1987, The Japanese government (METI) and the European Commission (Directorate General for Enterprises and Industry) established the EU-Japan Centre for Industrial Cooperation (originally called the EC-Japan Centre for Industrial Cooperation), a non-profit organization aimed at enhancing all forms of industrial, trade and investment cooperation between Japan and the EU. On July 18, 1991, after several months of difficult negotiations, Japanese Prime Minister Toshiki Kaifu signed a joint statement with the Dutch prime minister and head of the European Council, Ruud Lubbers, and with the European Commission president, Jacques Delors, pledging closer Japanese-European Community consultations on foreign relations, scientific and technological cooperation, assistance to developing countries, and efforts to reduce trade conflicts.

== Political relations and agreements ==
The EU and Japan share values of democracy, human rights, and market economics. Both are global actors and cooperate in international fora. They also cooperate in each other's regions: Japan contributes to the reconstruction of the western Balkans and the EU supports international efforts to maintain peace in Korea and the rest of Asia.

The EU Japanese relationship is anchored on two documents: the Joint Declaration of 1991 and the Action Plan for EU-Japan Cooperation of 2001. There are also a range of fora between the two, including an annual summit of leaders and an inter-parliamentary body. Both sides have now agreed to work towards a deep and comprehensive free trade agreement, discussed at the 42nd G7 summit on May 27, 2016. Four agreements thus far have been signed by the two sides;

- The EU-Japan Mutual Recognition Agreement (entered force on January 1, 2002)
- An Agreement on Co-operation on Anti-competitive Activities (adopted June 16, 2003)
- A Science and Technology Agreement between the EU and Japan (signed November 30, 2009)
- The Agreement on Co-operation and Mutual Administrative Assistance (entered force on February 1, 2008)

On December 8, 2017, Japan and the European Union finalized an Economic Partnership Agreement after an agreement in principle was reached in July 2017.

The EU-Japan Economic Partnership Agreement was officially signed on July 17, 2018, becoming the world's largest bilateral free trade deal, creating an open trade zone covering nearly one-third of global GDP.

== Trade ==
Japan and the EU are members of the Japan–European Union Comprehensive Economic Partnership Agreement (EPA), the world's largest open economic area, covering a third of the world's economy since February 1, 2019. Japan is the EU's 6th largest export market (3.3% in 2018 with a value of €64.75 billion). EU exports are primarily in machinery and transport equipment (31.3%), chemical products (14.1%) and agricultural products (11.0%). Despite a global growth in EU exports, since 2006 EU exports to Japan have been declining slightly. In 2009, due to the 2008 financial crisis, exports saw a 14.7% drop; however, in 2010 they recovered again by 21.3%. Japan is also the 6th largest source of imports to the EU (3.6% in 2018 with a value of €70.47 billion). Japanese exports to Europe are primarily machinery and transport equipment (66.7%). The EU is Japan's 3rd largest trading partner (11.1% of imports, 13.3% exports).

The trend in the goods trade since 2000 has been characterized by a significant reduction in the EU27 trade deficit with Japan due to a marked drop in latter's share in total EU imports from 9.3% in 2000 to 3.6% in 2012. For details, see the table below:

In 2013, automakers from EU exported 245,363 vehicles, worth €6.4 billion. On the other hand, 365,897 vehicles of €5.7 billion were imported from Japan.

Direction of trade	2000	2001	2002	2003	2004	2005	2006	2007	2008	2009	2010	2011	2012
EU to Japan € billion	45.5	45.5	43.5	41.0	43.4	43.7	44.7	43.7	42.3	35.9	43.9	49.0	55.5
Japan to EU € billion	92.1	81.1	73.7	72.4	74.7	74.1	78.2	78.9	76.2	58.2	67.3	69.2	63.8
Balance	−46.6	−35.6	−30.2	−31.4	−31.3	−30.4	−33.5	−35.3	−33.9	−22.3	−23.3	−20.2	−8.3

Between 2009 and 2011 the trade in commercial services between the two partners increased with the EU maintaining a stable surplus and Japan's share in total EU imports also remaining stable at just over 3%.

Direction of trade	2009	2010	2011
EU to Japan € billion	18.6	19.8	21.8
Japan to EU € billion	13.4	15.2	15.9
Balance	5.2	4.6	5.9

== Investment ==
Recently, foreign direct investment (FDI) flows have switched from an EU to Japanese centred flow to one from Japan to the EU. In 2006 the EU invested 16.2 billion euro and Japan disinvested 1.6 billion euro. By the end of 2009, 5.0% of the EU inward FDI stock came from Japan and 2.3% of EU outward FDI stock was in Japan. The EU has been attracting the largest portion of Japanese investment: €78 billion in investment stocks. For details, see the table below:

Direction	2008	2009	2010	2011
EU FDI to Japan € billion	1.726	1.301	−1.785	2.360
Japan FDI to EU € billion	2.324	2.607	2.952	12.068

Doing business and investing in Japan can be difficult for European companies and there have been some trade disputes between the two parties. However the slowdown in the Japanese economy encouraged it to open up more to EU business and investment. While working on reducing trade barriers, the main focus is on opening up investment flows.

== Organisations ==
The Delegation of the European Union to Japan, a formal diplomatic mission, and the European Business Council in Japan (EBC) are both based in Tokyo.

== Japan's foreign relations with EU member states ==
- Austria
- Belgium
- Bulgaria
- Croatia
- Cyprus
- Czech Republic
- Denmark
- Estonia
- Finland
- France
- Germany
- Greece
- Hungary
- (Republic of Ireland) Ireland
- Italy
- Latvia
- Lithuania
- Luxembourg
- Malta
- Netherlands
- Poland
- Portugal
- Romania
- Slovakia
- Slovenia
- Spain
- Sweden

== Summits ==
European Union–Japan summits
#	Date	Country	City	Ref	Image
14	2 May 2005	Luxembourg	Luxembourg City		
15	24 April 2006	Japan	Tokyo		
16	5 June 2007	Germany	Berlin		
17	23 April 2008	Japan	Tokyo		
18	4 May 2009	Czech Republic	Prague		
19	28 April 2010	Japan	Tokyo		
20	28 May 2011	Belgium	Brussels		
21	19 November 2013	Japan	Tokyo		
22	7 May 2014	Belgium	Brussels		
23	29 May 2015	Japan	Tokyo		
24	6 July 2017	Belgium	Brussels		
25	17 July 2018	Japan	Tokyo		
26	25 April 2019	Belgium	Brussels		
27	27 May 2021	Virtual meeting (Video conference)			
28	12 May 2022	Japan	Tokyo		
29	13 July 2023	Belgium	Brussels		
30	23 July 2025	Japan	Tokyo		

== See also ==
- Economy of the European Union
- Economy of Japan
- Foreign relations of the European Union
- Foreign relations of Japan
- EU–Japan Fest
- Rules of Origin
- Market access
- Free-trade area
