= East-East =

Japanese-Lithuanian architecture festival

East-East is a multiplex architectural event jointly held by the Lithuanian and Japanese architects and students of architecture.

== History ==
The concept of the Lithuania-Japan architectural event was conceived and its implementation coordinated by Dainius Kamaitis, a Lithuanian diplomat and former ambassador to Japan. He paved the way for the bilateral exchange in architecture domain by approaching both sides with a proposal to establish links which had not existed before. The idea was successfully implemented in Kaunas in cooperation with the Kaunas City Municipality and the Kaunas Section of the Architects Association of Lithuania in 2002. As the event enjoyed a considerable acclaim on both sides, following new initiatives by D.Kamaitis, subsequent architectural forums were implemented in Vilnius, Tokyo and Kaunas, in 2009, 2011, 2013 and 2022, accordingly. All the events received full support from the Architects Association of Lithuania and Japan Institute of Architects.

In 2019, the Government of Japan awarded D.Kamaitis with The Order of the Rising Sun, Gold and Silver Star, in recognition to his contribution to strengthening and promoting friendly relations between Japan and Lithuania.

== Origin of name ==
The name East-East is derived from the concept that Lithuania is located in the east of Europe, while Japan lies in the east of Asia. It implies mutual understanding, close cooperation and harmony.

== Objectives and structure ==
The initial target of establishing the links between the Lithuanian and Japanese architects has been achieved already. The long-term objectives are to strengthen the ties and make the joint events into a tradition, in order to foster continuous interaction not only between architects, but between students of architecture as well. The students' exchange is recognized by both sides as bearing particular importance to developing the future relations.

East-East spans almost a week and is built on three pillars:

- exhibition of architectural works
- public forum
- students workshop.

== East-East 1 ==
The first event was held between July 30 and August 1, 2002, in Kaunas, at Mykolas Žilinskas Art Gallery. The Japanese delegation was led by the 1993 Pritzker Prize (often referred to as the Nobel Prize of architecture) winner Fumihiko Maki and included seven leading Japanese architects Taro Ashihara, Chiaki Arai, Tetsuo Furuichi, George Kunihiro, Koh Kitayama, Hidetoshi Ohno and Kengo Kuma.

The keynote presentation by Fumihiko Maki who was awarded with the honorary membership of the Architects Association of Lithuania, aroused considerable public interest. On behalf of the host side, Linas Tuleikis, Chairman of the Kaunas Section of the Architects Association of Lithuania, gave a lecture on the contemporary Lithuanian architecture.

=== Exhibition ===
Joint exhibition of works by the Lithuanian and Japanese architects kicked off at the very outset of the event. It was honoured by the very presence of Valdas Adamkus, President of Lithuania. Besides the works of the Japanese architects present at the event, those of Nobuaki Furuya, Kazuo Iwamura, Atsushi Kitagawara, Hiroshi Naito, Tadasu Ohe and Ken Yokogawa were exhibited as well. On the Lithuanian side of the exhibition, the works of Vilius Adomavičius, Audrius Ambrasas, Artūras Asauskas, Gintaras Čaikauskas, Darius Čiuta, Gediminas Jurevičius, (late) Algimantas Kančas, Audrys Karalius, Šarūnas Kiaunė, Kęstutis Kisielius, Sigitas Kuncevičius, Saulius Mikštas, Gintautas Natkevičius, Rolandas Palekas, Saulius Pamerneckis, Kęstutis Pempė, Ramūnas Raslavičius were presented.

=== Public forum ===
A public forum was held on July 30–31. It was divided into the following five sessions:

- New program
- New building type
- New order
- New material
- East meets East.

A broad and interesting discussion on the above topics evolved. The Japanese architects presented their ideas featuring their own practical applications, while their Lithuanian counterparts Tomas Grunskis, Jūratė Tutlytė, Vytautas Petrušonis and Jonas Audėjaitis were more concerned with theoretical generalization.

=== Students workshop ===
The workshop was held between July 27 and August 1 at Kaunas Art Institute of Vilnius Academy of Arts, dealing with the acute issue which Kaunas is facing in relation to adjacent rivers. During the Soviet period of the Lithuanian history, rapidly developing industry in Kaunas city left a significant trace in its urban fabric. After the restoration of independence, most of the bigger industrial plants built on the bank of Nemunas river were closed. As a result, and also due to the transport reorganization scheme implemented during the Soviet period, despite its unique location on the confluence of two rivers, the city has virtually lost any contact with them.

The workshop groups were given the task to find effective points and propose a unique architectural concept which would facilitate the return of picturesque but desolated riverside areas back to the city.

A group of 17 Japanese and 19 Lithuanian students were split into 6 mixed teams. Design named "Tunnels" (by Io Kato, Shunsuke Tomida, Hiroaki Kishimoto, Tomas Kučinskas, Aurėja Leskauskaitė, Eivaras Rastauskas) was selected as the winning entry. "Parasite" was awarded with the second prize, and the third award went to "Magic Box".

The students represented the following higher institutions:

- in Japan – Tokyo University of the Arts, Yokohama National University, Nihon University, University of Tokyo, Kokushikan University, Chiba Institute of Technology and Tokyo University of Science
- in Lithuania – Kaunas University of Technology, Vilnius Academy of Arts, Kaunas Faculty of Vilnius Academy of Arts, Vilnius Gediminas Technical University.

== East-East 2 ==
The second event took place in Vilnius and was held at Vilnius City Municipality and Contemporary Art Centre between June 30 and July 4, 2009. The renowned architect Riken Yamamoto led the Japanese delegation which included Taro Ashihara, George Kunihiro, Ken Yokogawa, Nobuaki Furuya, Takaharu Tezuka, Taira Nishizawa, Manabu Chiba and Hiroshi Sambuichi. At the opening of the event, Riken Yamamoto delivered the keynote lecture at Vilnius City Municipality.

=== Exhibition ===
Five Japanese architects Takaharu Tezuka, Taira Nishizawa, Manabu Chiba, Hiroshi Sambuichi and Shuhei Endo (the latter was not present at the event himself) exhibited their works under the title "New Wave of Japanese Architecture 2009" at Vilnius City Municipality.

=== Public forum ===
On July 1, a public forum was held at Contemporary Art Centre, featuring lectures by two speakers from each side, followed by a discussion. Taro Ashihara and Tomas Grunskis presented their views on public space as the focus of life in a city, and the philosophy of the traditional house was introduced by Ken Yokogawa and Gintaras Čaikauskas.

Discussion on architecture was continued on July 3 at the international conference "Architecture: a Part of Culture (?)" held at Vilnius Town Hall. George Kunihiro and Nobuaki Furuya were among the lecturers.

=== Students workshop ===
Four mixed groups comprising 10 students each from Japan and Lithuania generated ideas aimed at the recovery of a problematic area. The point at issue – Park of Architecture, an area of about 58 hectares in one of the most beautiful locations in close proximity to Vilnius Old Town. Since the 19th century, noxious and polluting industries were developed there, which resulted in the loss of interface between the area and its natural environment, architectural integrity and broken functional and social links with the city. The workshop was therefore tasked with proposing "hot spots" which would help in resurrecting the Park of Architecture and give new life to this socially degraded part of Vilnius city.

On July 4, during the presentation of works at Cultural Platform KultFlux located next to Mindaugas Bridge, the design named "Valley" (by Hiroshi Yamada, Hiroyuki Nogami, Ježi Stankevič, Marius Ščerbinskas and Rasa Chmieliauskaitė, consultant architects George Kunihiro and Gintaras Čaikauskas) was selected as the winner. The idea of a valley was proposed as a public space, part of which would have to be flooded with water. Thus the once industrial plants surrounded with water would be turned into buildings for public use: swimming pool, theater, cinema etc. Elevated horizontal surfaces would be erected between the buildings in order to link the former plants with the land, serving as public spaces for communication and leisure.

The students represented the following higher institutions:

- in Japan – Waseda University, Tokai University, Kyoto Institute of Technology, Kokushikan University
- in Lithuania – Kaunas University of Technology, Vilnius Academy of Arts, Kaunas Faculty of Vilnius Academy of Arts, Vilnius Gediminas Technical University.

== East-East 3 ==
The third event was held in Tokyo at Japan Institute of Architects, Ginza TS Building and Gyoko-dori Underground Gallery between May 31 and June 4, 2011. The Lithuanian delegation included ten leading architects Gražina Janulytė-Bernotienė, Gintaras Balčytis, Linas Tuleikis, (late) Algimantas Kančas, Gintaras Čaikauskas, Linas Naujokaitis, Rolandas Palekas, Marius Šaliamoras, Donaldas Trainauskas, Gintautas Vieversys and 10 students of architecture.

=== Exhibition ===
Japanese and Lithuanian architects exhibited their designs at Gyoko-dori Underground Gallery between June 1 and 29. It was a part of an exhibition UIA2011 TOKYO 111 Days Before which kicked off as a pre-event to the 24th World Congress of Architecture in Tokyo (UIA2011).

The Lithuanian part of the exhibition included works by architectural firms, project teams and individual architects. Firms represented:

Kančo studija, Ambraso architektų biuras, G.Natkevičius ir partneriai, E.Miliūno studija, R.Paleko Arch-studija, Architektūros estetikos studija, Vilius ir partneriai, Vilniaus architektūros studija, Laimos ir Ginto projektai, G.Janulytės-Bernotienės studija, 4PLIUS, Architektūros linija, Gečia, Dviejų grupė, Urbanistika.

Project teams and individual architects included:

Tadas Balčiūnas, Vytautas Biekša, Marius Kanevičius; Jūras Balkevičius, (late) Vytautas Čekanauskas, Lina Masliukienė, Marius Šaliamoras, Algirdas Umbrasas; Kęstutis Pempė, (late) Gytis Ramunis; Darius Čiuta, Gintaras Auželis; Alvydas Šeibokas, Gabrielis Malžinskas; Andrius Skiezgelas, Aleksandras Kavaliauskas, Martynas Nagelė; Kęstutis Lupeikis.

Japanese participants displayed their own individual designs:

Fumihiko Maki, Riken Yamamoto, Chiaki Arai, Kazuo Iwamura, Tetsuo Furuichi, Ken Yokogawa, Hidetoshi Ohno, Taro Ashihara, Koh Kitajama, George Kunihiro, Kengo Kuma, Nobuaki Furuya, Tadasu Ohe, Manabu Chiba, Shuhei Endo, Makoto Yokomizo, Takaharu Tezuka+Yui Tezuka, Atelier Bow-Wow, Hiroshi Sambuichi, Takenori Naka, Masakatsu Matsuyama, Kumiko Inui, Yoshiaki Tanaka, Yukihide Mizuno, Shinichiro Akasaka, Osamu Fujita, Makoto Maeda, Ryuichi Ashizawa, Shogo Aratani, Yasutaka Yoshimura, Kazuhide Doi, Koichi Furumori, Tsukasa Kinjo, Yukiko Nadamoto, Hiroshi Nakamura, TNA Makoto Takei+Chie Nabeshima, Keisuke Maeda, Yuuoh Mino, Koji Kimi, Koji Nakawatase.

=== Public forum ===
On June 4, a public forum under the title 'Billows Over the Architecture and Cities in the 21st century' was held at Japan Institute of Architects. It provided a platform to exchange ideas for a better future of architecture, emerging from the need to address the issues of climate change, population decrease in industrialized countries, economic conflict between the old developed countries and rising economies and safety of nuclear power. These changes are on par with the industrial revolution in the 19th century, and will be followed by the paradigm shift in the fundamentals of knowledge, economy and society.

The forum featured lectures by three speakers from each side. Gintaras Čaikauskas, Linas Naujokaitis and Linas Tuleikis presented the Lithuanian views, while Hidetoshi Ohno, Nobuaki Furuya and Manabu Chiba discussed the topic from the Japanese perspective.

=== Students workshop ===
The workshop was held between May 31 and June 3 at Ginza TS Building. 10 Lithuanian and 11 Japanese students were split into four mixed groups and tasked with creating an attractive Ginza District in central Tokyo by means of new urban interventions.

For that purpose, each group made research and design proposals on one of the four themes: conservation and contemporary interpretation of historical buildings, vertical circulation between small-sized commercial buildings, facade/skin design of a humongous redeveloped building, and open space utilization of public/private properties. The completed designs were presented at the seminar on June 4.

The students represented the following higher institutions:

- in Japan – Meiji University, Keio University, Shibaura Institute of Technology, Tama Art University
- in Lithuania – Kaunas University of Technology, Vilnius Academy of Arts, Kaunas Faculty of Vilnius Academy of Arts, Vilnius Gediminas Technical University.

The students participants list:

Japanese students Shogo Nagata, Eri Ohara, Kenta Sasaki, Hinako Hagino, Rei Yamaguchi, Masamitsu Tanikawa, Takeaki Yokoi, Masaru Iijima, Takahiro Idenoshita, Mayumi Suzumoto, Rei Koizumi. Lithuanian students Mykolas Svirskis, Antanas Šarkauskas, Ieva Bartkevičiūtė, Matas Šiupšinskas, Ieva Cicėnaitė, Vytenis Raugala, Rasa Marozaitė, Aistė Tarutytė, Mantas Gipas, Andrius Vilčinskas.

== East-East 4 ==
For the first time, the fourth East-East forum was incorporated in the framework of another event and was held on September 23–27, 2013 in Kaunas at Žalgiris Arena as part of Kaunas Architecture Festival (KAFe), an international event of contemporary architecture spanning two months.

Notably, East-East 4 received support from the Asia-Europe Foundation (ASEF) and its partners under the second edition of Creative Encounters – Cultural Partnerships between Asia and Europe. Creative Encounters is a programme developed by ASEF in partnership with Arts Network Asia (ANA), an Asia-wide network of artists and arts organisations, and in cooperation with Trans Europe Halles (TEH), the European Network of Creative Arts Spaces.

The Japanese delegation included architects Manabu Chiba, Nobuaki Furuya, Kazuko Akamatsu, Masahiro Harada, Koichi Yasuda, Toshikatsu Ienari, Akiko Miya and Takeshi Hosaka.

At the closing of the event, Ryue Nishizawa, laureate of the Pritzker Prize (2010), delivered a keynote lecture on behalf of Sejima and Nishizawa and Associates (SANAA).

=== Exhibition ===
On September 24, Japanese and Lithuanian architects unveiled their works at a joint exhibition which lasted until October 16. Besides the works of the Japanese architects who were present at the event, SANAA, Sou Fujimoto and Kazuhiro Kojima displayed their designs as well.

The Lithuanian architects represented at the exhibition were: Šarūno Kiaunės projektavimo studija, R.Paleko Arch-studija, a.s.a. Sigito Kuncevičiaus projektavimo firma, Andrė Baldi, Aketuri architektai, L&G projektai, G.Natkevičius ir partneriai, E.Miliūno studija, Kančo studija, G.Janulytės-Bernotienės studija, Baltas fonas, Gintaras Kuginys, Darius Čaplinskas, Andrius Ciplijauskas, Gediminas Bulavas, Eventus Pro, Projektavimo ir restauravimo institutas, Darius Čiuta, 4PLIUS.

=== Public forum ===
For the first time, the forum was substituted by two sets of lectures by the Japanese architects. On September 24, Toshikatsu Ienari, Akiko Miya and Koichi Yasuda presented their views on architecture, while Nobuaki Furuya and Manabu Chiba lectured on September 27.

=== Students workshop ===
The workshop was held between September 24 and 26. 11 Lithuanian and 7 Japanese students formed four mixed groups to challenge the task "The City Centre and Its Relationship With Rivers".

The idea of re-designing the waterfront area of Kaunas city was revisited after 11 years since East-East 1. Kaunas has exceptional features, as it had been built on the confluence of two large rivers. However, this authentic geographic context remains almost unused in the urban life. Therefore, finding ways to bring the waterfront to the center of everyday life was the core architectural task for the workshop.

On September 27, the presentation and exhibition of completed designs was held. The jury made of Japanese and Lithuanian architects selected the winning proposal "Floating Towers" (by Ayako Motai, Medeina Kurtinaitytė, Simon Tsing Shan Mok, Antanas Šarkauskas and Vytautas Lelys).

The students represented the following higher institutions:

- in Japan – Waseda University, University of Tokyo, Shibaura Institute of Technology, Tokyo Institute of Technology, Japan Women's University
- in Lithuania – Kaunas University of Technology, Vilnius Academy of Arts, Kaunas Faculty of Vilnius Academy of Arts, Vilnius Gediminas Technical University.

== East-East 5 ==
The fifth East-East edition was held at Žalgiris Arena in Kaunas on September 23-26, 2022, featuring Recovery as the overarching theme. It was the main focus of the 2022 Kaunas Architecture Festival (KAFe). Recovery theme was chosen to draw attention to the fact that human activity has so profoundly altered the surrounding environment that technological innovation, industrial development and urban sprawl have distorted sustainable living, depleting natural resources. East-East 5 therefore called for reflection on how to live in an increasingly hostile environment, and for recovery through well-thought-out healing of the urban fabric of the city, so as to make a pivot towards nature the priority for human activity.

=== Exhibition ===
Exhibition curators: Paulius Vaitiekūnas, Shinichi Kawakatsu.

Human activity has transformed natural landscapes and ecosystems, changing land use and the global climate. The exhibition presented architectural approaches to environmental recovery.

The East-East 5 exhibition presented the “Recipe for Recovery” - the architectural techniques and philosophy and the architectural process of the best Japanese and Lithuanian architects: models, plans, cross-sections, details, hand drawings, diagrams, axonometric views etc.

The exhibition took place in the former Kaunas Central Post Office building, one of the most iconic examples of Kaunas modernist architecture. It was closed in 2019 and is planned to be transformed into an Architecture Centre.

The exhibition displayed 40 projects by Lithuanian and Japanese architects and architectural studios.

Participants from Japan: Kei Kaihoh, Osamu Nishida, Tsuyoshi Tane, Yasutaka Yoshimura, Suzuko Yamada, Eri Tsugawa, Miho Tominaga, Shingo Masuda, Kenichi Teramoto, Fuminori Nousaku, Kozo Kadowaki.

Participants from Lithuania: Audrius Ambrasas Architects, Do Architects, Gintaras Balčytis, A2SM Architektai, Aketuri Architektai, G. Natkevičius ir partneriai, Paleko architektų studija + architektų studija Plazma, Office de Architectura, Processoffice, Vilniaus architektūros studija, Arches, Šarūno Kiaunės projektavimo studija, Archinova + PLH Arkitekter, Nebrau, Laurynas Žakevičius, LG projektai & GAL architektai.

=== Public forum ===
Curators: Andrius Ropolas, Yasutaka Yoshimura

Japanese architects Osamu Nishida, Suzuko Yamada, Kei Kaihoh, Yasutaka Yoshimura, Kenichi Teramoto, Shingo Masuda took part in the forum, while the Lithuanian side was represented by Gabrielė Šarkauskienė and Antanas Šarkauskas, Vytautas Biekša, Gabrielė Ubarevičiūtė and Giedrius Mamavičius, Edgaras Neniškis.

George Kunihiro and Gintaras Balčytis, principal curators of East-East 5, summarized the discussion.

The highlight of the forum was the lecture "Back to Nature" by Kengo Kuma, one of Japan's leading contemporary architects.

On 26 September, Japanese architects Tsuyoshi Tane, Eri Tsugawa and Shinichi Kawakatsu gave lectures at the Faculty of Construction and Architecture of Kaunas University of Technology.

=== Students workshop ===
Curators: Martynas Marozas, Kei Kaihoh.

The theme of recovery was also reflected in the title of the students' workshop "A Playground for Recovery". The unfinished Hotel Britanika in the very center of Kaunas served as the venue for the workshop.

Five teams were made of 10 Japanese and 8 Lithuanian students and tried out five different approaches to Hotel Britanika:

- Cultural Playground in Kaunas (Patricija Markevičiūtė, Mako Kijima, Ignas Arlauskas, Naoki Kitagaki) : playing with culture - an innovative cultural centre,

- Eat.Sleep.Work.Repeat (Akiha Shimizu, Adelė Astrauskaitė, Gabrielė Ibėnaitė, Motoki Susa) : playing with economy - an independent mechanism that generates added value to the city's economy,

- ECOctopus (Martynas Stakvilevičius, Tautvydas Zykevičius, Keika Sato, Naoya Ando) : playing with ecosystems - a place for reinforcing city's ecosystems,

- Play Energy! (Auksė Vilkevičiūtė, Erina Shibagaki, Masato Sako) : playing with energy - a building that generates energy and shares it with the neighbourhood,

- Neighbourhood-ing (Vilius Jagminas, Yumeno Noda, Tetsu Kimura) : playing with people - a bridge between various public spaces.

The preparation for the workshop started with video conference on August 22-26, and the workshop itself was held at the Faculty of Construction and Architecture of Kaunas University of Technology on September 24-25. It was rounded up by a public presentation of the workshop results on September 26.

The students represented the following higher institutions:

- in Japan – Waseda University, University of Tokyo, Shibaura Institute of Technology, Tokyo University of Science, Meiji University, Hosei University, Kyoto University, Shinshu University.
- in Lithuania – Kaunas University of Technology, Vilnius Academy of Arts, Kaunas Faculty of Vilnius Academy of Arts.
