= Kanazawa Umimirai Library =

Public library in Kanazawa city, Ishikawa Prefecture, Japan

Coordinates: 36.5943°N 136.6043°E

- 金沢海みらい図書館
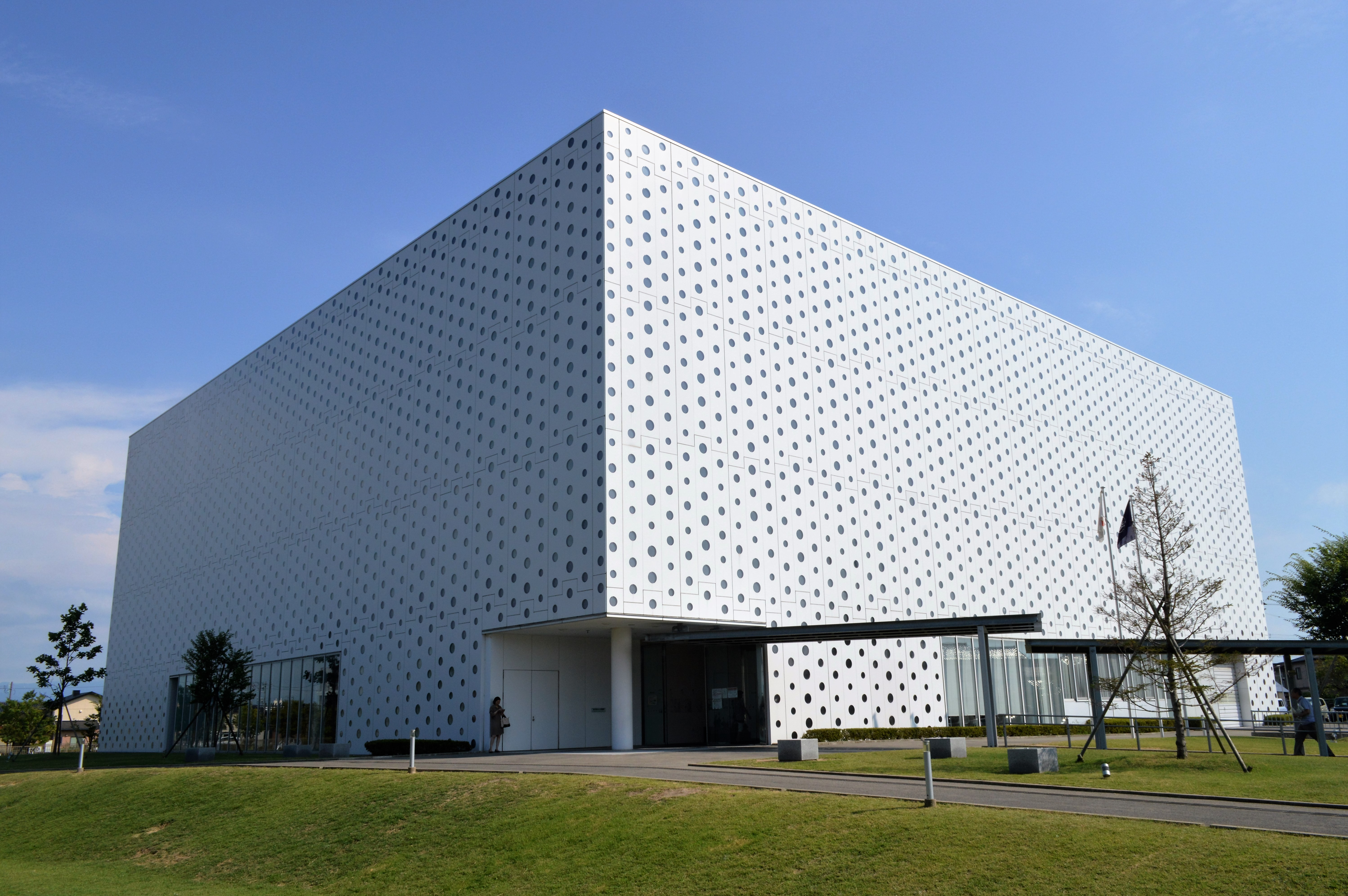
- Location: Kanazawa city, Ishikawa Prefecture, Japan
- Type: Public library
- Established: 2011
- Architects: Coelacanth K&H Architects

Collection
- Size: 228,000 items

Access and use
- Population served: General public

Kanazawa Umimirai Library is a public library located in Kanazawa city, Ishikawa Prefecture, Japan. This is a contemporary building by the Japanese architects Kazumi Kudo and Hiroshi Horiba, completed in 2011. Its surface creates a decorative grid made of some 6000 small circular blocks of glass which puncture the concrete surface of the building in a triangular array.

== Building ==
The firm that designed the library, Coelacanth K&H, describe the building as a "simple space" of 45m by 45m and 12m high. It was completed in March 2011. The floor area is 5,641.9 square metres; the building's area is 2,311.9 square metres. The "single quiet and tranquil room ... resembles a forest, filled with soft light and a feeling of openness reminiscent of the outdoors".

== Prize ==
Hiroshi Horiba and Kazumi Kudo won a Japan Institute of Architects Prize for the library in 2013.

== Gallery ==
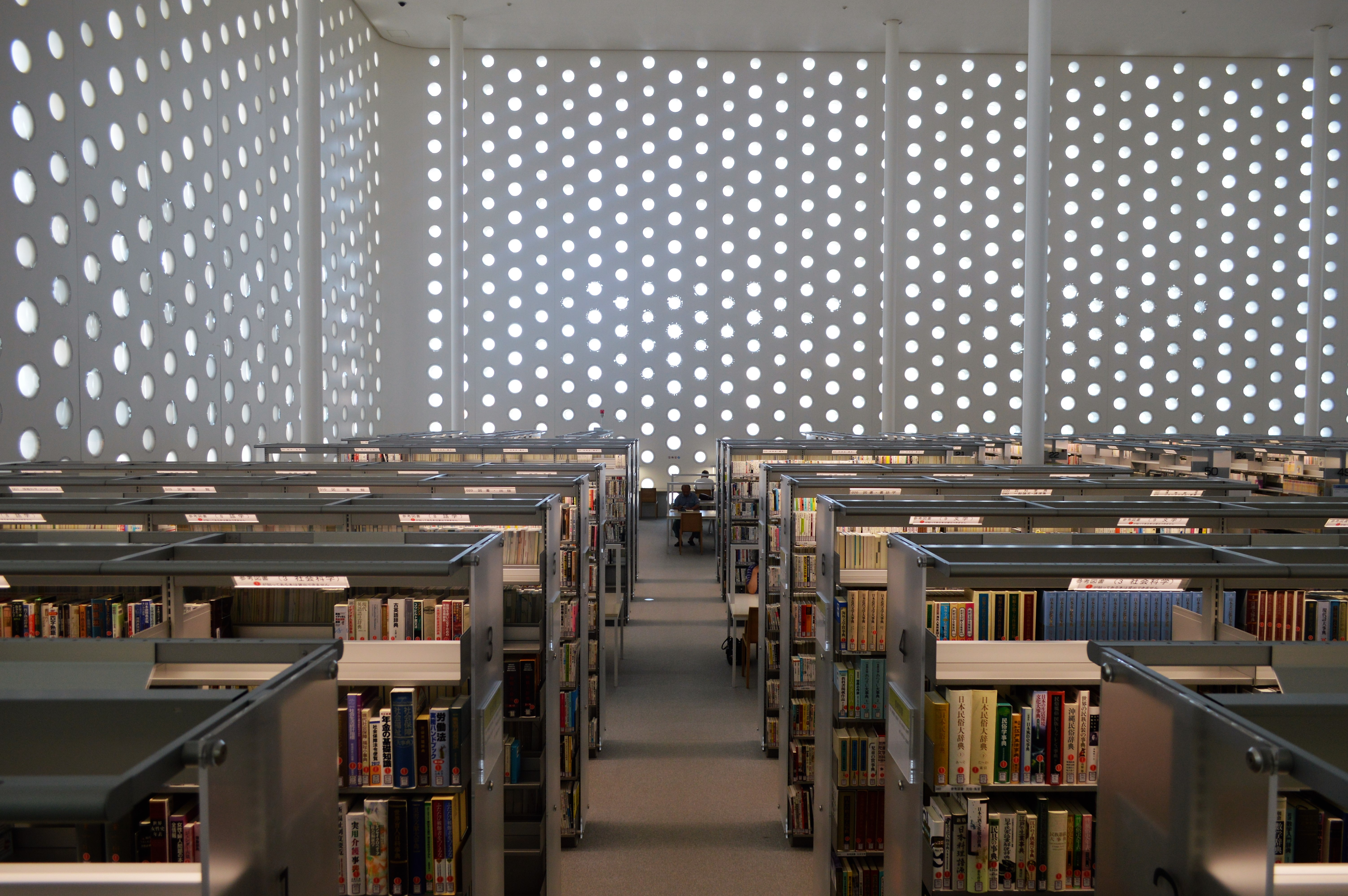

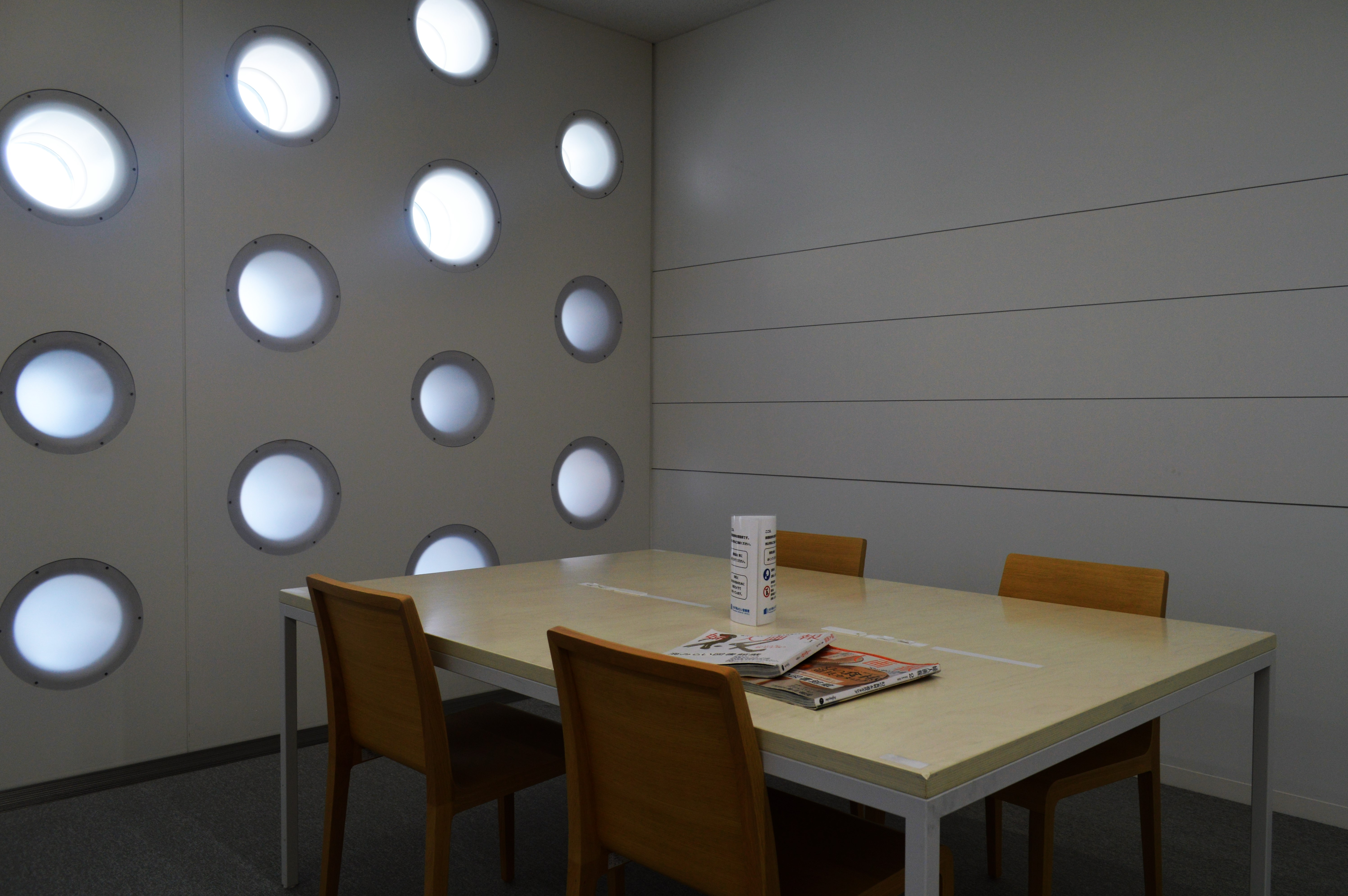

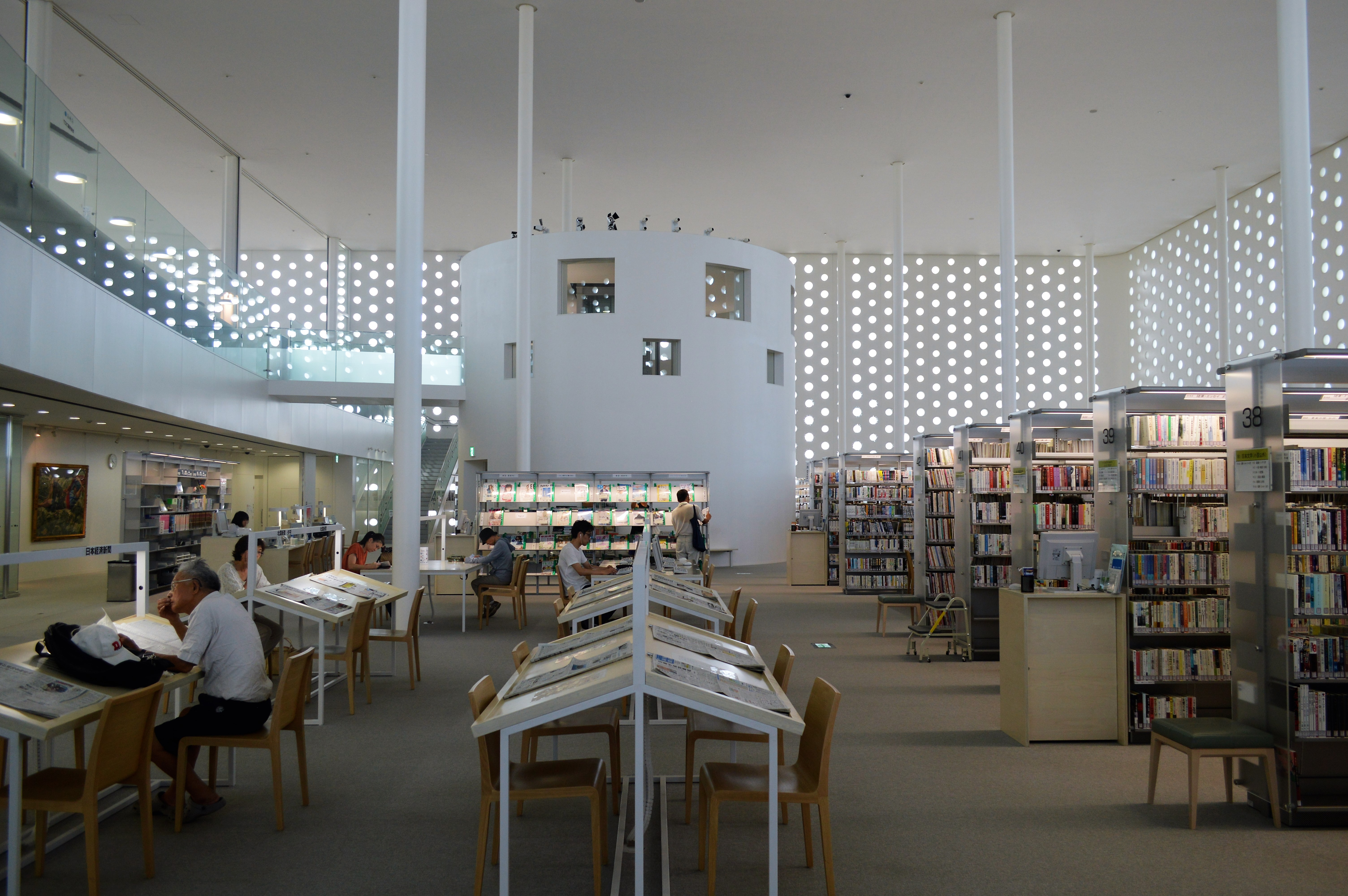

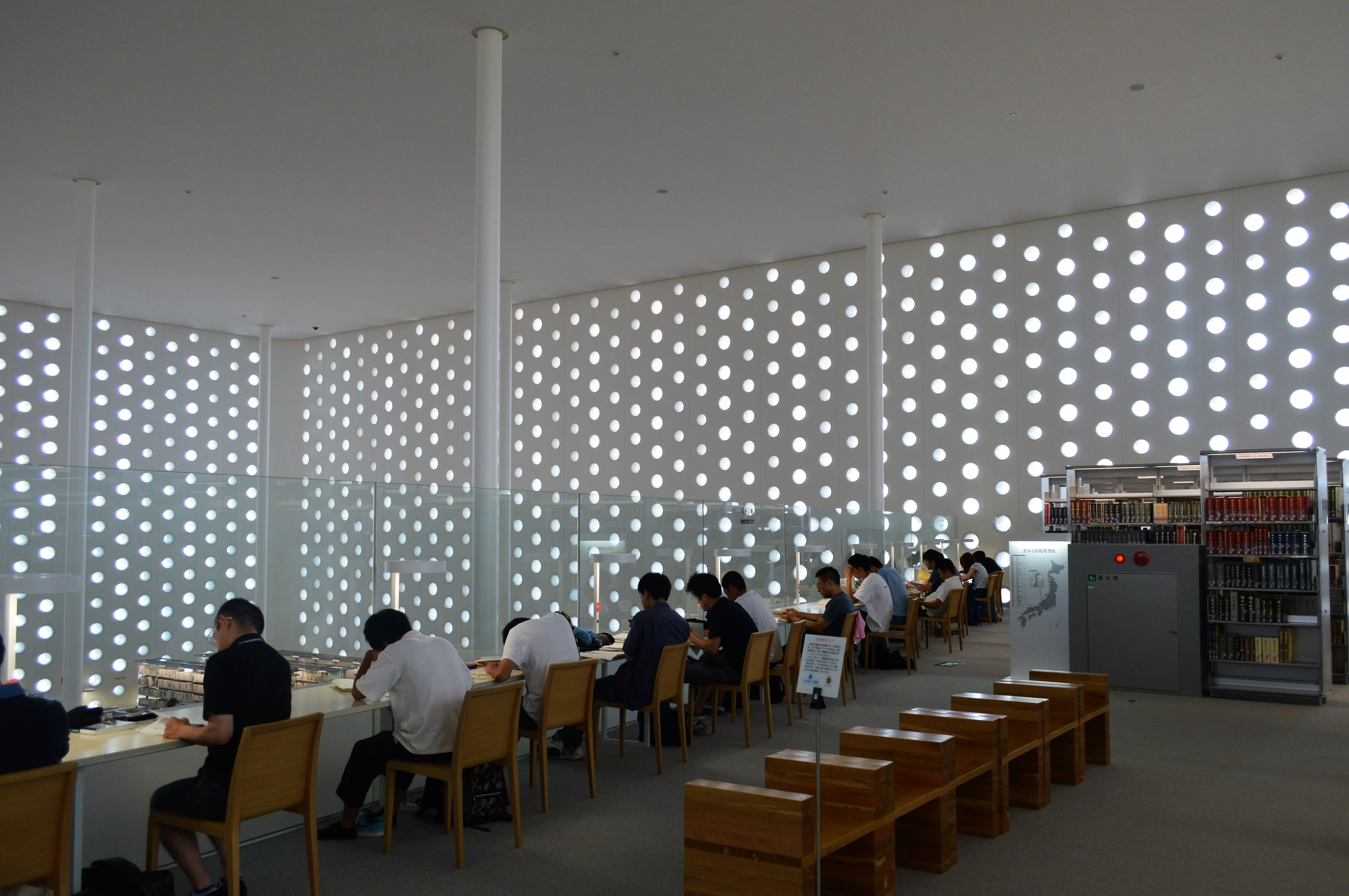

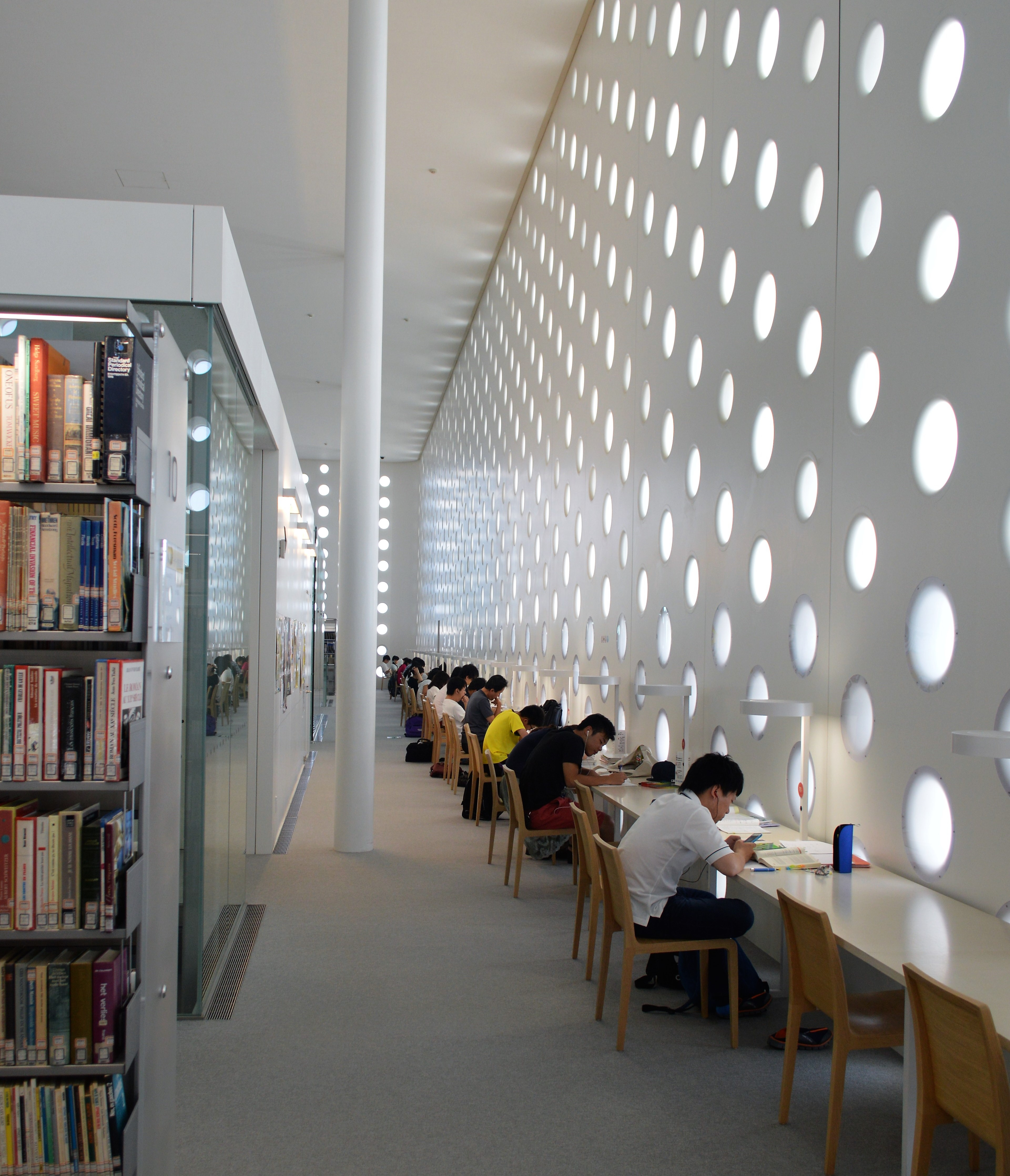

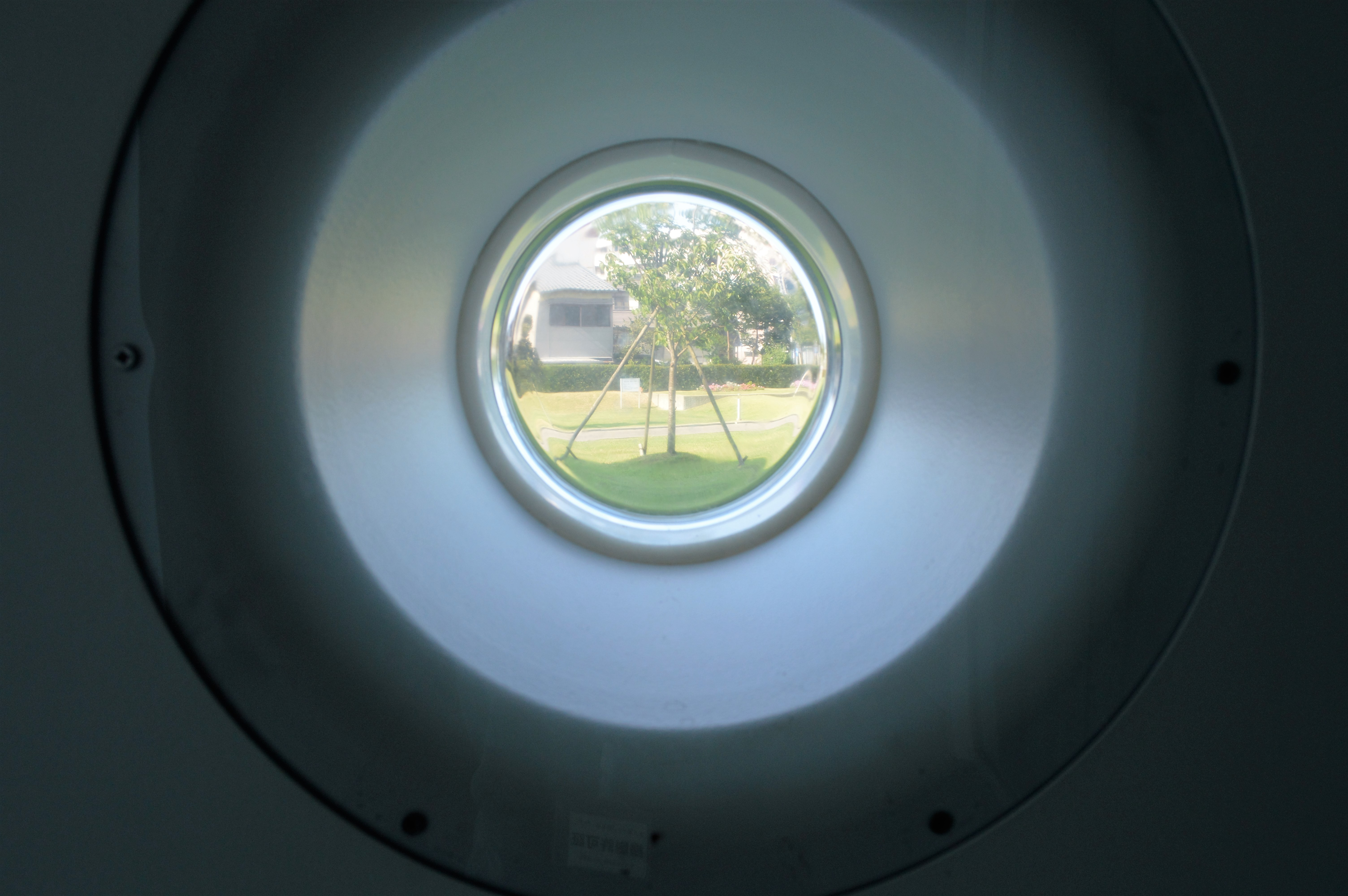

== See also ==
- Mathematics and architecture
