= Nikolai Ostroumov =

- Николай Остроумов
- Born: 15 November 1846; Sasovo, Yelatma Uyezd, Tambov Governorate, Russian Empire
- Died: 17 November 1930 (aged 84); Tashkent, Uzbek SSR, Soviet Union

Nikolai Petrovich Ostroumov (Russian: Николай Петрович Остроумов; 1846–1930) was an imperial Russian orientalist, ethnographer and educationalist in Turkestan.

He studied under Nikolai Il'minskii at the Kazan Theological Seminary, where he studied Arabic and Turkic languages as well as Islam.

He was editor of Turkistan Wilayatining Gazeti from 1883 to 1917.
