= Japan–Romania relations =

Bilateral relations between Romania and Japan

Romania-Japan relations
- Japan: Romania

Romania-Japan relations refers to the bilateral relations between Japan and Romania. Diplomatic relations between Romania and Japan were established in 1917, at legation level. On 1 May 1923, the Honorary Consulate General of Romania in Osaka was established. In the context of World War II, bilateral diplomatic relations were severed on 31 October 1944 and were resumed on 1 September 1959. On 1 June 1964, diplomatic relations were upgraded to embassy level.

== History ==
=== 17th - 19th century ===
The first information about Japan appeared in the Romanian lands at the end of the 17th century and is attributed to the Romanian scholar Nicolae Milescu, the spătar who undertook a well-known journey to Qing China in 1675-1676. He recorded his travel impressions and the information he gathered about the Far East in a work entitled Descriptions of China (Descrierea Chinei). In the final chapter of this work, entitled “Description of the Famous and Great Island of the Japanese and What Is Found There,” the Romanian scholar brings together everything he had learned about the lands of the Japanese.

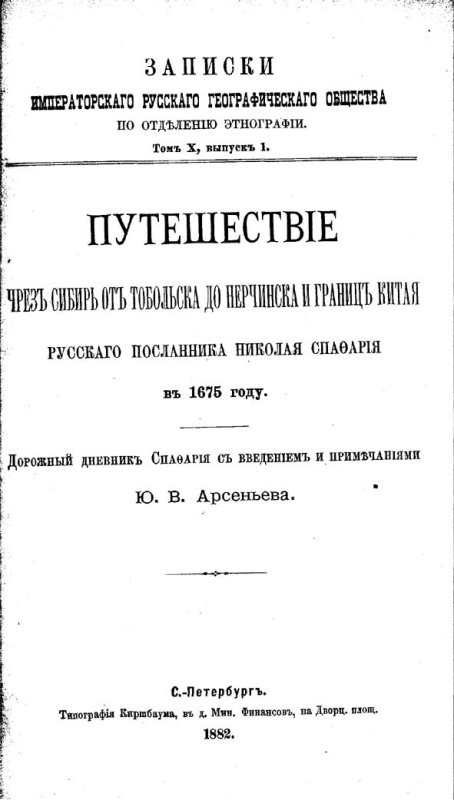
Travels through Siberia to the Chinese Borders, published in St. Petersburg in 1882.

Although the manuscript was not published until later, it nevertheless circulated among European scholarly circles, providing valuable information, especially as it had been written in the period after 1638–1641, when Japan had once again isolated itself from the Western world. Following the accounts of Marco Polo from the 13th century, Nicolae Milescu offered the latest information about Japanese society, its political and administrative organization, the opposition between the feudal lords and the central power, traditions and character traits, religion, and the origins of the Japanese people.

Later contacts took place in the 19th century, mainly through the Orthodox mission in Japan. Although they were part of a Russian mission, figures such as Iacob Tihai and Anatolie Tihai helped facilitate relations between Japan and the Orthodox world by translating important works into Japanese and assisting in the establishment and organization of schools and music schools.

=== 20th century ===
Japan–Romanian relations date back to 1902, when the two countries' ministers in Austria-Hungary held their first consultations concerning the establishment of diplomatic relations.

==== World War I ====
During World War I, the Kingdom of Romania joined the Allied Powers, alongside the Empire of Japan. Romania and Japan therefore fought on the same side during the war.

Around the same time, Romania received a visit from a Japanese military delegation. The delegation arrived during a critical period of the war, following the Romanian Army's resistance against the German offensive at the Battle of Mărășești and the Battle of Oituz. In recognition of the military prowess and heroism of General Eremia Grigorescu, as well as that of the Romanian Army, the Emperor of Japan presented him with a sword. The sword, now held in the collection of the National Military Museum, bears the inscription: “You are the ones who write the history of the country". The Romanian newspaper România, in its 6 September 1917 issue, described the meeting between the Japanese delegation and Grigorescu in particularly laudatory terms, writing that the “undefeated sons of the sun” had discovered in the “descendants of the Dacians” a people related to them through their heroism.

==== Interwar period ====
In 1917, Japan and Romania established official diplomatic relations. In 1921, the Romanian legation in Kyoto was established. The following year, in 1922, the Japanese legation in Romania was established in Bucharest. In 1923, Romania established an honorary consulate general in Osaka.

==== World War II ====
During World War II, Romania joined the Tripartite Pact on 23 November 1940, becoming a member alongside the Empire of Japan, Nazi Germany, and Italy. On 25 November 1941, Romania also joined the Anti-Comintern Pact, which had originally been initiated by Japan and Germany. Through these agreements, Romania became a member of the Axis, alongside Japan.

Following King Michael's coup in August 1944, Romania switched sides and joined the Allied Powers. As a result, diplomatic relations between Romania and Japan were severed.

==== Cold War ====
Following the end of World War II, Japan and Romania restored diplomatic relations in 1959. On 1 June 1964, the two countries established embassies in each other's capitals. Thereafter, they maintained friendly relations, including during the Cold War, despite belonging to opposing blocs.

==== Modern Day ====
Following the end of the Cold War and the collapse of the communist rule in 1989, Romania transitioned to democracy. In 2002, the two countries commemorated the 100th anniversary of their first diplomatic consultations. On the occasion, the President of Romania visited Japan, where the two countries signed the "Common Declaration of Friendship, Cooperation and Partnership between Japan and Romania".

In 2009, Japan and Romania marked the 50th anniversary of the restoration of diplomatic relations with commemorative events held in both countries. Prince and Princess Akishino visited Romania, while Traian Băsescu, then President of Romania, made an official working visit to Japan.

In 2021, Japan and Romania marked the 100th anniversary of the establishment of diplomatic relations in 1921.

== Economic relations ==
=== Trade ===
Japan's trade with Romania amounts to 93.7 billion yen in imports and 42.1 billion yen in exports, with Japan running a deficit of roughly twice the value of its exports. Japan exports automobiles, electrical equipment, chemical products, and other goods to Romania, while importing tobacco, electrical equipment, clothing, and other goods from Romania. Since the signing of the Japan–European Union Economic Partnership Agreement, Romania's trade with Japan has been expanding.

As of 2019, there were 106 Japanese companies operating in Romania.. Investment by Japanese companies in Romania is concentrated around Bucharest and in the Transylvania region near the Hungarian border. Among Japanese manufacturing companies operating in Romania are Japan Tobacco International (JTI), Sumitomo Wiring Systems, and Yazaki Corporation. In 2016, Nidec acquired ANA IMEP, a manufacturer of electric motors for home appliances. By sector, investment related to the automotive industry is the main focus, and with the enlargement of the European Union, Romania's potential as a manufacturing base for the automotive industry has increasingly attracted attention. Accordingly, imports of automotive parts from Japan, including electrical circuit components for wire harnesses, have been increasing.

In addition, in 2011, Sumitomo Corporation, through a subsidiary, acquired the agricultural trading company ALCEDO in 2013, NTT DATA acquired EBS, an IT services company headquartered in Cluj-Napoca and in 2017, Yusen Logistics acquired SC Tibbett Logistics SRL, the eighth-largest logistics company in Romania by sales. These and other developments indicate that the fields in which Japanese companies are interested in investing have become increasingly diversified.

In the sales and distribution sector, Honda Trading, Bridgestone, Mitutoyo (measuring instruments), and others have established operations in Romania, and the size of the Romanian sales market, with a population of approximately 20 million, has attracted attention.

=== Economic support ===
As part of its economic assistance, Japan began providing economic cooperation to Romania in 1991 through technical cooperation and cultural grant aid, in support of Romania's democratization and transition to a market economy following the change of regime. Following the 1996 visit to Japan by President Emil Constantinescu, Japan began providing yen loans and general grant aid to Romania.

The yen-loan projects provided to Romania include the Constanța South Port Improvement Project (approximately ¥12.8 billion), the Road Improvement Project (approximately ¥9.2 billion), the Bucharest–Constanța Railway Modernization Project (approximately ¥25.6 billion), and the Turceni Thermal Power Plant Environmental Protection Project (approximately ¥28.7 billion). These projects have received high evaluations from the Romanian side.

In March 2010, during the visit to Japan by President Traian Băsescu, an Exchange of Notes was signed concerning the Bucharest International Airport Access Railway Construction Project (approximately ¥41.9 billion). This was scheduled to be the final yen-loan project for Romania.

In addition, at the grassroots level, the Japan Overseas Cooperation Volunteers were dispatched to Romania from 1997 onward, with a total of 112 volunteers dispatched, primarily in the fields of youth activities and healthcare, before the program ended in December 2008. Japan's assistance to Romania was gradually reduced in light of the country's economic development and accession to the European Union, and all assistance was terminated at the end of fiscal year 2011. By that time, Japan's cumulative assistance to Romania had exceeded ¥120 billion, making Japan one of Romania's major donor countries.
