= Dainius =

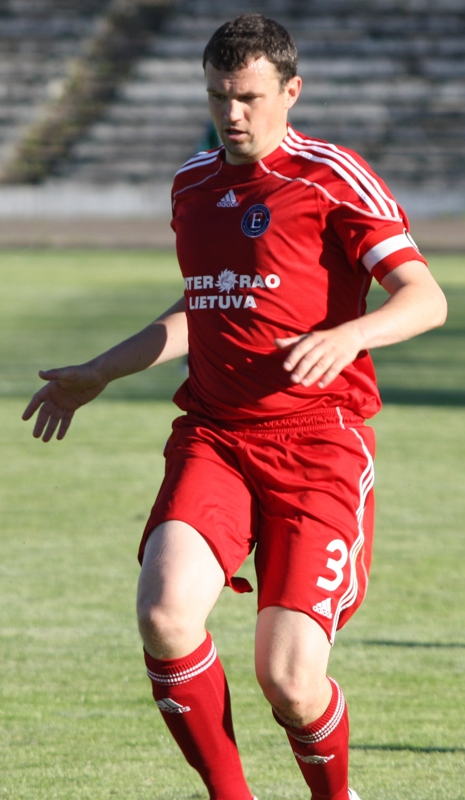

Dainius is a Lithuanian name

== List of people named Dainius ==
- Dainius Adomaitis (born 1974), retired Lithuanian basketball player
- Dainius Gleveckas (born 1977), Lithuanian football defender currently playing for FK Ekranas
- Dainius Šuliauskas (born 1973), retired Lithuanian football defender, who last played for FK Sūduva Marijampolė
- Dainius Kairelis (born 1979), Lithuanian road bicycle racer
- Dainius Kamaitis (born 1965), Lithuanian diplomat, ambassador
- Dainius Kreivys (born 1970), politician, Minister of Economy of Lithuania
- Dainius Saulėnas (born 1979), Lithuanian football Forward who plays for FK Vidzgiris Alytus
- Dainius Šalenga (born 1977), Lithuanian basketball player for BC Rūdupis
- Dainius Virbickas (born 1971), retired Lithuanian long-distance runner
- Dainius Zubrus (born 1978), Lithuanian ice hockey right winger and center
