= EU–Japan Fest =

Cultural exchange

The EU–Japan Fest (EU･ジャパンフェスト, Īyū-japan-fesuto) is the cultural exchange between the European Union and Japan that is arranged with the help of the EU–Japan Fest Japan Committee (EU･ジャパンフェスト日本委員会, Īyū-japan-fesuto Nihon iinkai), a Japanese organization that since 1992 has worked to create such exchanges between the year's Cultural Capital of Europe and Japan. The "Fest" aims to support both traditional and innovative culture.

The EU–Japan Fest Japan Committee is a non-profit organization financed by European governments, the Agency for Cultural Affairs and other Japanese government institutions, and donations. Its office is in Kōjimachi, Chiyoda, Tokyo.

The program for Patras in 2006 included exhibitions of architecture and photography, and dance and musical performances.

Publications include In-Between, a fourteen-volume set of photographs of Europe by Japanese photographers, and European Eyes on Japan, a seven-volume set of photographs of Japan by European photographers.

== See also ==
- Japan–European Union relations
- Foreign relations of the European Union
- Foreign relations of Japan
- Vulcanus in Japan
