= Ethiopia–Japan relations =

- Ethiopia: Japan

Ethiopia–Japan relations are the international relations between Ethiopia and Japan. Before the Second Italo-Ethiopian War the Japanese worked towards economic goals with the Ethiopians in attempts to expand Japan's trade with the rest of the world.

== Ethiopian Empire ==
=== Relations before Italo-Ethiopian War ===
In 1911, around 60,000 stands of arms and 6,000,000 cartridges taken by the Japanese from Port Arthur during the Russo-Japanese War were sold to Ethiopia.

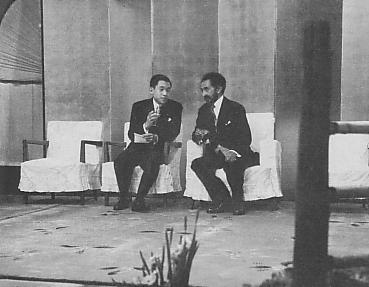
Meeting of Emperor Haile Selassie and Crown Prince Akihito in November 1955.

Kuroki Tokitaro, the Vice consul in Port Said, was sent by the Japanese foreign ministry to negotiate with the Ethiopians after diplomat Sugimura Yotaro stated that they could serve as good trade clients. Tokitaro arrived in Djibouti on November 16, 1924, and after negotiating with the Ethiopians in Addis Ababa reported that Ethiopia could fulfill Japan's cotton needs and could offer land for cultivation. On November 26, 1926, Tokitaro was sent back to Ethiopia to negotiate a trade treaty, but was told to delay as the government was still undecided on whether or not to establish a legation to Ethiopia. After support was given from Mushanokoji Kintomo, the Japanese ambassador to Romania, the negotiations continued and on June 21, 1927, the two countries signed a Treaty of Friendship and Commerce that was written in Japanese and French and another was ratified on November 15, 1930, after the Japanese were able to instruct someone to speak Amharic.

In 1927, an Economic Survey Party was sent by the Japanese government under the leadership of Oyama Ujiro that toured British East Africa, Portuguese Mozambique, Madagascar, and Ethiopia to study the political and economic conditions of the areas before returning to Japan via Djibouti on February 20, 1928.

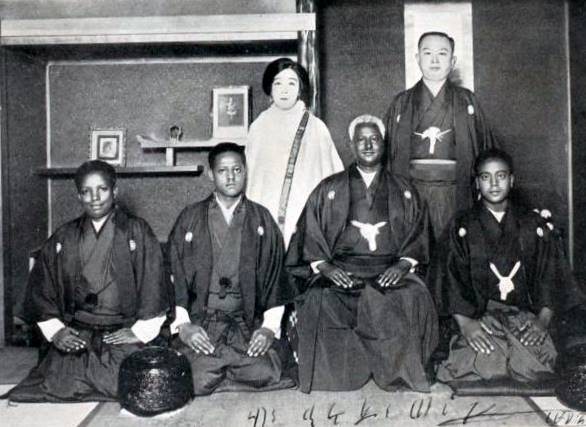
The Ethiopian delegation in Japan.

In 1931, Emperor Haile Selassie asked the Japanese to accept an ambassador extraordinary delegation to be sent to Japan. The delegation, headed by foreign minister Heruy Wolde Selassie and consisting of Teferi Gebre Mariam, Araya Abeba, and Daba Birrou, left Addis Ababa on September 30, 1931, with a Japanese diplomat and left Djibouti on October 5, to sail to Japan. The delegation toured Japan to inspect the Japanese Army and to learn how Ethiopia could modernize its country in a way similar to the Japanese. Two lions were sent by Selassie to Emperor Hirohito and arrived in Japan on December 2, where they were placed into the Ueno Zoo. The Ethiopian delegation left Japan on December 28, and arrived in Addis Aaba on January 29, 1932.

The Meiji Constitution was used as a model for the 1931 Constitution of Ethiopia by the Ethiopian intellectual Tekle Hawariat Tekle Mariyam. This was one of the reasons why the progressive Ethiopian intelligentsia associated with Tekle Hawariat were known as "Japanizers".

In 1934, the two countries agreed to an irrigation development project where 100,000 Japanese planters would help with irrigation systems around Lake Tana and the Japanese legation to Ethiopia hoped to receive funding from the 1935-1936 budget to create an embassy in Addis Ababa. In 1933, the Ethiopians established an honorary consulate-general in Osaka, Japan, and on January 1, 1936, the Japanese establish an embassy in Addis Ababa. At the same time, there was a popular speculation of a royal marriage between the two countries, with Prince Lij Araya Abeba and Masako Kuroda, daughter of Viscount Hiroyuki Kuroda. However, tense pressure from Western countries, particularly Italy, undermined the relationship due to the fears of an 'anti-white supremacy' nature behind the marriage and the arrangement was cancelled.

In 1934, two Japanese gunboats visited Djibouti, the primary maritime door to Ethiopia, and that same year the Japanese government sent Tsuchida Yutaka on an inspection tour of Ethiopia. Although eager to protect Ethiopia's independence from the predations of the United Kingdom, France, and Italy, and optimistic about commercial opportunities, Tsuchida felt that Japan, far from Ethiopia, could not have an effect on imperialist ambitions there.

The Italians were critical of the Japanese relations with Ethiopia while increasing military supplies in their colonies in Eritrea and Somaliland. In December 1934, a series of border clashes occurred along the Ethiopian-Somaliland border during which the Japanese supported the Ethiopians and asked them to stand up against the Italians.

=== Relations after World War II ===
In 1955, Japan and Ethiopia re-established diplomatic ties, and three years later they exchanged ambassadors.

=== Post-revolution ===
Until the 1974 Ethiopian revolution, Japanese investors played a major role in the Ethiopian textile industry, after which their holdings were nationalized. During 1982 and 1983, the Ethiopian government settled claims made by Japanese and other foreign nationals over the loss of their investments.

=== Modern Ethiopia ===
After the fall of the Derg, Japanese investment and foreign aid was restored to Ethiopia. The Ethiopian Foreign Minister Seyoum Mesfin visited Japan in 1992, and in 1996 Prime Minister Meles Zenawi also made a formal visit to Japan. In return, the Japanese Foreign Minister Yoriko Kawaguchi visited Ethiopia in 2002.

== See also ==
- Foreign relations of Ethiopia
- Foreign relations of Japan
