= Tarasivtsi =

Commune in Chernivtsi Oblast, Ukraine

Tarasivtsi Тарасівці Tărăsauți
- Village
- Interactive map of Tarasivtsi
- Location in Chernivtsi Oblast Location in Ukraine
- Coordinates: 48°12′10″N 26°22′2″E
- Country: Ukraine
- Oblast: Chernivtsi Oblast
- Raion: Chernivtsi Raion
- Elevation: 127 m (417 ft)

Population (2012)
  - Total: 5,000
- Time zone: UTC+2 (CET)
  - Summer (DST): UTC+3 (CEST)

Tarasivtsi (Romanian: Tărăsăuți; Ukrainian: Тарасівці) is a village in Chernivtsi Raion, Chernivtsi Oblast, Ukraine. It belongs to Vanchykivtsi rural hromada, one of the hromadas of Ukraine. The population of the village is more than 5,000 people, of which 95% are ethnic Romanians and Moldovans.

Tarasivtsi (Tărăsauți) is located next to the Romanian border. The river Prut flows through the village.

== History ==
Historical affiliations

Moldavia 1473–1812
Russian Empire 1812–1917
Moldavian Democratic Republic 1917–1918
Kingdom of Romania 1918–1940
Soviet Union (Ukrainian SSR) 1940–1941
Kingdom of Romania 1941–1944
Soviet Union (Ukrainian SSR) 1944–1991
Ukraine 1991–present

Until 18 July 2020, Tarasivtsi belonged to Novoselytsia Raion. The raion was abolished in July 2020 as part of the administrative reform of Ukraine, which reduced the number of raions of Chernivtsi Oblast to three. The area of Novoselytsia Raion was split between Chernivtsi and Dniester Raions, with Tarasivtsi being transferred to Chernivtsi Raion.

Tarasivtsi was notable as the only place in Ukraine where the Romanian language had been designated as a regional language. This occurred after Ukraine permitted regional languages to be designated in August 2012. The Constitutional Court of Ukraine on 28 February 2018 ruled this legislation unconstitutional.

== Demographics ==
At the 2001 Ukrainian census, 97.43% of inhabitants spoke Romanian as their native language, while 1.86% spoke Ukrainian.

== Notable people ==
- Anatolie Tihai, hieromonk
- Iacob Tihai, composer
