= Kazan Theological Seminary =

Coordinates: 55°51′32.4″N 49°4′30.5″E

Kazan Theological Seminary (Russian: Казанская духовная семинария, Tatar: Казан руханилар семинариясе, romanized: Qazan ruxanilar seminariyäse) is the principal Russian Orthodox seminary in the Diocese of Kazan and Tatarstan.

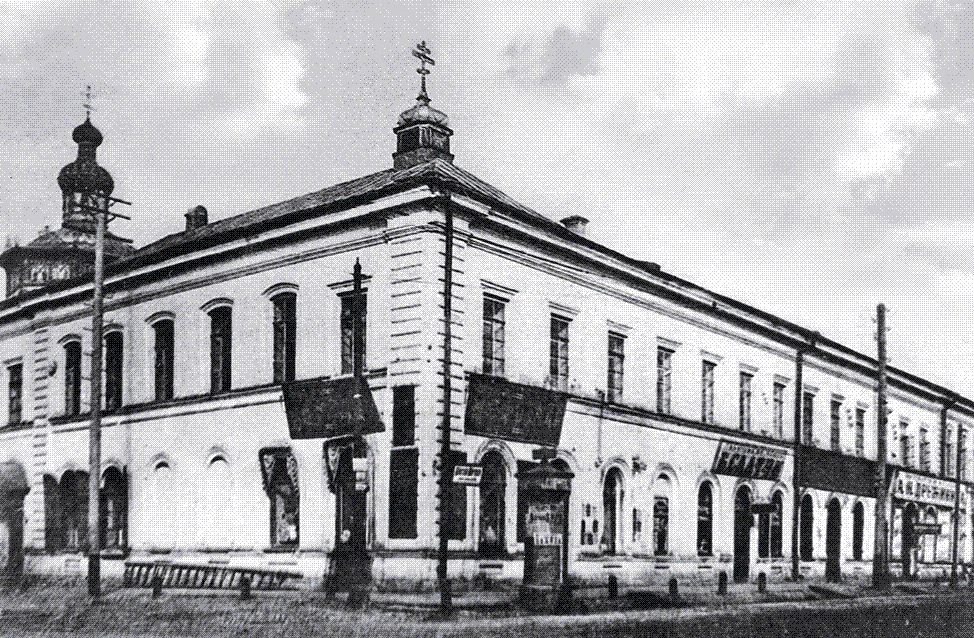

== History ==
Orthodox Christian Theological education in Kazan has its roots dating back to 1718, when a school for the children of clergy was established. This was followed by the opening of the Kazan Slavonic-Latin School in 1723, which was reorganized as the Kazan Theological Seminary in 1732.

An attempt to provide higher education was made in 1798 through the establishment of the Kazan Theological Academy. However, this proved unsustainable and the institution was returned to the Kazan Theological Seminary in 1818. However, in 1842, the Theological Academy was revived and continued to function until the 1917 revolution, during which time it became the fourth-ranked theological academy in the Russian Empire.

In 1847, the Academy supported the missionary efforts of the Kazan Diocese by organizing a committee to oversee the translation of texts to reach non-Christian peoples. During the tenure of Bishop Grigory Postnikov (1848 to 1856), the Academy received the extensive library of the Solovetsky Monastery. In 1895, Anthony Khrapovitsky (later Metropolitan of Kiev) became the rector of the Academy, serving until 1900.

== Notable people associated with the academy ==
The Kazan Academy produced over eighty students who later were consecrated bishops. Some of these became regarded as martyrs by the Russian Orthodox Church, including;

- Gavrill Abolimov
- Anatoly Grisyuk, the rector of the academy
- Nikolay Ilminsky, professor
- Athanasy Malinin
- Juvenaly Maslovsky, bishop
- Victor Ostrovidov
- Ioann Poyarkov
- Iov Rogozhin
- German Ryashentsev
- Dmitry Mikhailovich Shishokin, priest
- Gury Stepanov
- Ioasaf Udalov

Notable alumni include;

- Victor Pokrovsky, a Russian missionary, translator and musician
- Nikolay Nikolsky, historian and folklorist
- Bishop Euthymius, Bishop of Lukhovitsy
- Ilia Berdnikov - an expert in church law
- Nikolai Ostroumov - educationalist
- Viktor Ivanovič Nesmelov - a philosopher
- Gordiy Sablukov - an expert on Islam, who produced the first Russian translation of the Koran
- Peter Znamensky - a historian
