= Embassy of Austria, Tokyo =

Austrian Embassy Tokyo
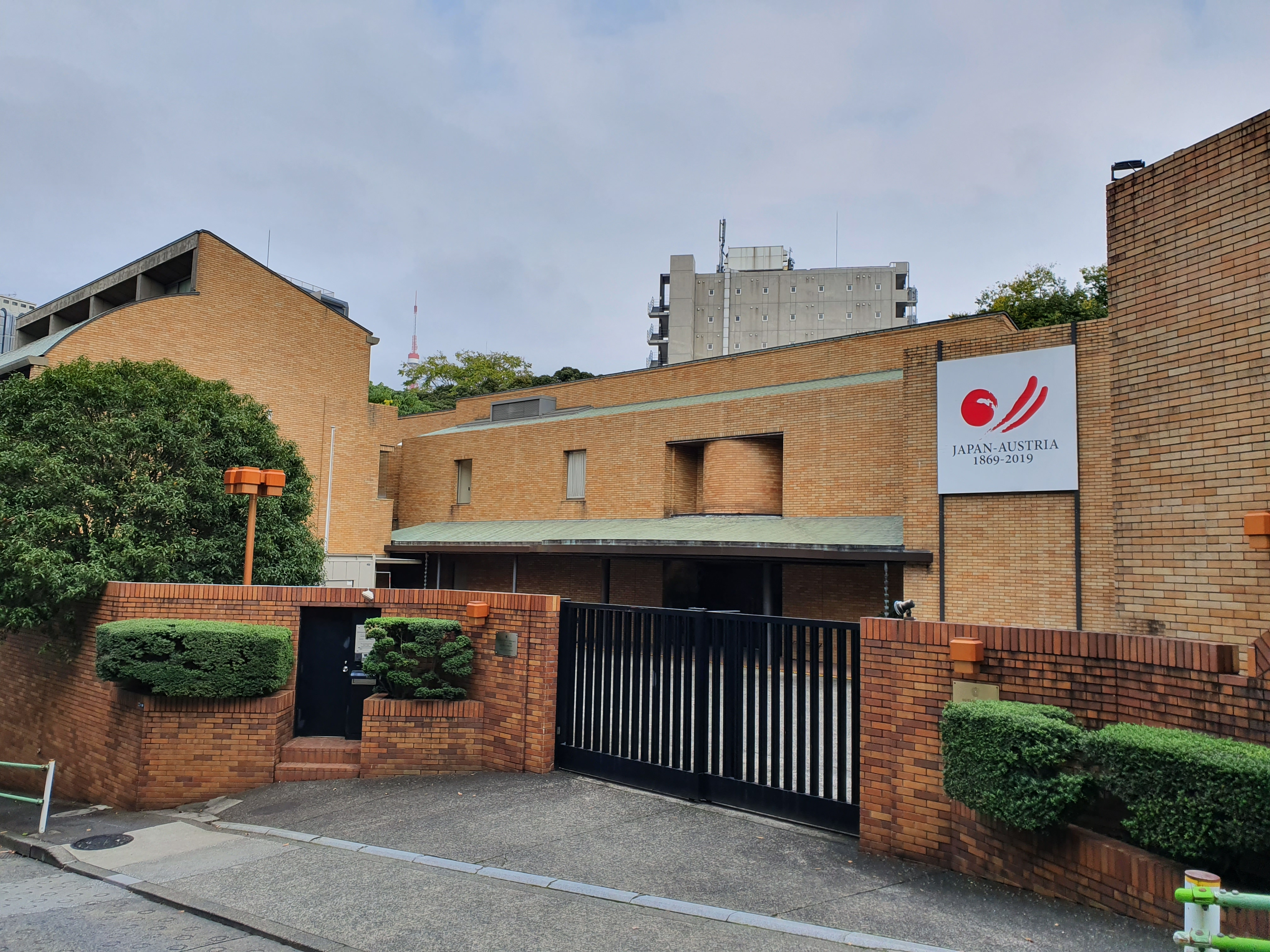
- Address: 1-1-20, Moto Azabu, Minato-ku, Tokyo
- Ambassador: Elisabeth Bertagnoli

The Austrian Embassy Tokyo (German: Österreichische Botschaft Tokio; Japanese: 在京オーストリア大使館, romanized: Zaikyō Ōsutoria Taishikan) is the main diplomatic mission representing Austria in Japan. It is located in the Minato ward of the Japanese capital Tokyo.

== History ==
After establishing relations with Japan in 1869, Austro-Hungary searched for a suitable site to hoist a legation. After some setbacks and negotiation with the Japanese government, a residence in the foreign enclave at Tsukiji was purchased in 1876, but a fire later that year led to its destruction and the eventual move to the Kioichō district in 1877. The legation was promoted to an embassy in 1907 following Japan's victory in the Russo-Japanese War leading to an elevation of its status to "great power", but the property was handed over to other countries through World War I due to the suspension of diplomatic relations, eventually being destroyed in the 1923 Great Kantō earthquake.

Relations remained interrupted through the interwar period. During World War II, Nazi Germany annexed Austria in 1938 and essentially abolished the Austrian diplomatic service. Although many other missions were absorbed into the German foreign service at least partially, the honorary consul in Tokyo at the time instead opted to leave to Shanghai and rally the Austrian community exiled there, which would lead to his recognition by the Austrian legation in France as "a great patriot". However, he was also utilized by the occupied Foreign Ministry to collect information on the situation there.

Following the war, diplomatic relations were restored in 1953 and the offices that each country had in the other were re-promoted to embassies in 1957. A new chancery and ambassador's residence designed by Maki and Associates was opened in April 1976 and has remained in use to this day. In 2011, the embassy was temporary relocated to Osaka during the Great East Japan Earthquake amid worries of excessive radiation in Tokyo, leading to the embassy staff shifting to the Osaka consulate and a spike in activity there.

== See also ==
- Austria-Japan relations
