= Euthymius Moiseyev =

Bishop

Bishop Euthymius
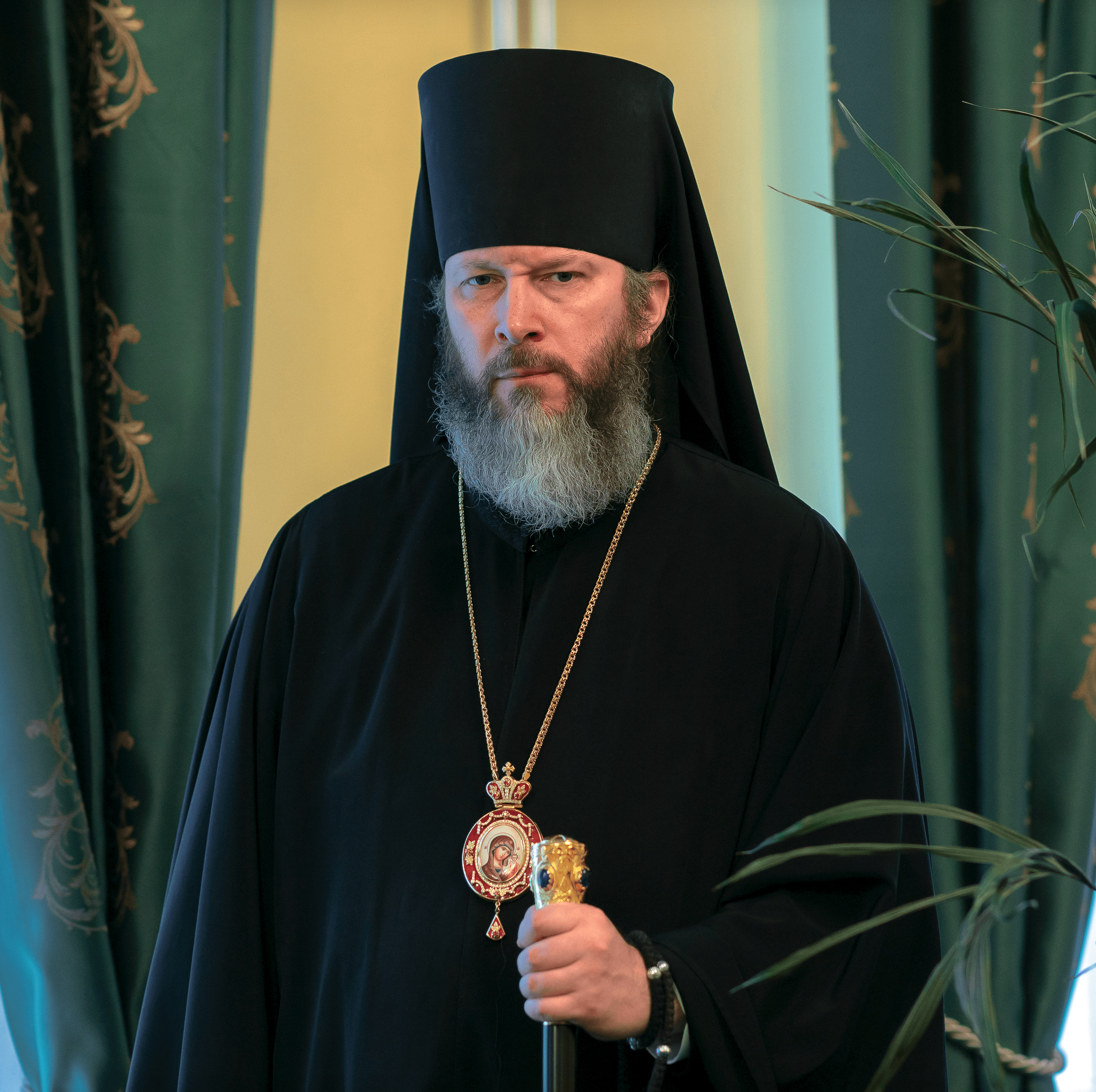
- Church: Russian Orthodox Church

Orders
- Consecration: March 20, 2022

Personal details
- Born: Dmitry Alexandrovich Moiseyev; August 30, 1972 (age 54) Kaliningrad, Moscow Oblast

Bishop Euthymius (Russian: Епископ Евфимий, secular name Dmitry Alexandrovich Moiseyev, Russian: Дмитрий Александрович Моисеев; born August 30, 1972) is bishop of the Russian Orthodox Church, titular Bishop of Lukhovitsy, vicar of the Patriarch of Moscow and All Russia (since March 20, 2022), Chairman of the Synodal Missionary Department (since December 29, 2021).

== Biography ==
Born on August 30, 1972, in Kaliningrad (now Korolyov) Moscow Oblast. In 1994 he graduated from the Philological Faculty of Moscow State University. In 1997 he graduated from the Moscow Theological Seminary, and in 2001 — the Moscow Theological Academy.

On April 4, 2001, he was tonsured a monk. On April 12 he was ordained a hierodeacon

In 2001, he completed an advanced study course at the University of Bern in Switzerland. Since 2001, he has taught German at the Moscow Theological Seminary and served as a reference to the rector of the Moscow Theological Academy, as well as head of the publishing department of the Educational Committee of the Russian Orthodox Church and the Moscow Theological Academy.

On June 2, 2002, he was awarded the degree of candidate of theology for his dissertation on "The missionary activity of Saint Boniface, the enlightener of the Germanic peoples".

On December 4, 2003, he was ordained a hieromonk. On October 14, 2005, he was awarded the pectoral cross.

On April 25, 2010, Archbishop Eugene (Reshetnikov) of Vereya elevated him to the rank of hegumen in the Intercession Academic Church.

On July 26, 2010, by the decision of the Holy Synod of the ROC, he was appointed deputy Chairman of the Publishing Council of the Russian Orthodox Church.

On March 19, 2014, by the decision of the Holy Synod, he was appointed rector of the Kazan Theological Seminary. On May 30, 2014 due to the increase in administrative duties for the seminary headed by him, by the decision of the Holy Synod, he was dismissed from the post of deputy chairman of the Publishing Council.

In connection with the appointment of Metropolitan Theophan (Ashurkov) of Kazan and Tatarstan as Rector of Kazan Theological Seminary on October 22, 2015, he was transferred to the position of first vice-rector.

On November 26, 2015, he participated in the II Forum of the Orthodox Community of the Republic of Tatarstan.

By the Easter holiday of 2016, on the proposal of Metropolitan Theophan of Kazan and Tatarstan, Patriarch Kirill awarded him the right to wear a cross with ornaments.

On April 4, 2019, by the decision of the Holy Synod, he was appointed rector of the Tula Theological Seminary: "Having learned that the seminary is at the very bottom of the rating of the Educational Committee, I was in some suspense. However, the very first visit to the seminary showed that the existing problems are problems of growth, and in fact the Tula Seminary has a fairly good personnel, pedagogical potential that can ensure its sustainable growth in the future."

In October 2020, he founded the magazine of the Tula Theological Seminary "Spiritual Arsenal" and became its editor-in-chief.

On December 29, 2021, by the decision of the Holy Synod of the Russian Orthodox Church, he was released from the rectorship at the Tula Theological Seminary, appointed vicar of the Vysokopetrovsky Monastery, chairman of the Synodal Missionary Department and the Orthodox Missionary Society, and determined to be a vicar of the Patriarch of Moscow and All Russia with the title "of Lukhovitsy".

On February 25, 2022, Metropolitan Dionysius (Porubay) of Voskresensk elevated him to the rank of Archimandrite at the Epiphany Cathedral in Yelokhovo, Moscow.

On March 18, 2022, in the Cathedral of Christ the Savior in Moscow, he was nominated as bishop of Lukhovitsky, vicar of the Patriarch of Moscow and All Russia.

On March 20, 2022, in the Cathedral of Christ the Savior in Moscow his episcopal consecration took place, which was performed by: Patriarch Kirill, Metropolitan Paul (Ponomaryov) of Krutitsy and Kolomna, Metropolitan Dionysius (Porubay) of Voskresensk, Metropolitan Alexius (Kutepov) of Tula and Yefremov, Metropolitan John (Popov) of Belgorod and Stary Oskol, Metropolitan Eugene (Reshetnikov) of Tallinn and All Estonia, Metropolitan Theognost (Guzikov) of Kashira, Bishop Paramon (Golubka) of Naro-Fominsk, Bishop Sabbas (Tutunov) of Zelenograd.

On October 24, 2024, by a decision of the Holy Synod of the Russian Orthodox Church, he was relieved of his posts as chairman of the Synodal Missionary Department, vicar of His Holiness the Patriarch of Moscow and All Russia, and suoerior of the Vysokopetrovsky Monastery, with the appointment of vicar of the Patriarchal Exarchate of Africa, while retaining the same title.
