= Victor Pokrovsky =

Victor Alexandrovich Pokrovsky was a choir director, translator, and music arranger. He worked for the Metropolitan Sergius (Tikhomirov) at Holy Resurrection Cathedral (Tokyo, Japan) from 1924 until 1962—except for during World War II and some of the first decade after the war. He followed in a tradition of Russian missionaries of bringing the Gospel to new people in their language. In Japan, he followed in the tradition of Ss. Innocent of Moscow and Nicholas of Japan, and of Nicholas's successor Sergius. In regard to liturgical music of the Japanese Orthodox Church, Victor Pokrovsky was to Sergius as Iacob Tihai was to St. Nicholas. Victor successfully brought the Russian liturgical music masters to the Japanese in their own language. Metr. Sergius invited Victor, an émigré of the Russian civil war, to Tokyo to help him introduce 19th and 20th century Russian liturgical works in Japanese. Their close collaboration continued until World War II brought it to an end.

== Life ==
Victor A. Pokrovsky

Victor was born on February 13, 1897, the first son of Fr. Alexander Andreevich and Nadezhda Petrovna (née Ismailov). His father was the priest at a church in the Suhaya Rika district near Kazan, Russia. The Pokrovskys were a priestly family. Their family name was Gremyashkin, but during the time of Tsar Paul I of Russia, Victor's priestly ancestor was given the family name of Pokrovsky by his bishop who visited his parish on the day of the Protection of the Theotokos (Pokrov).

Victor studied for four years at the Kazan Theological Seminary before entering Kazan University in 1914. As a university student he sang with the Morreff Choir, which Mr. Ivan Kolchin (later choir director of Holy Trinity Cathedral in San Francisco) also joined, and attended the conductor class at Kazan Hummert Music School. After three years of student life, he was called into the Army as an officer, but was released after the February Revolution. He then returned to the Kazan University for his fourth year.

After the Bolshevik coup of 1917, he was recalled to army service in 1918 into the White Army, to advance eventually to the rank of captain. As the Red Army advanced, he was forced to leave Kazan and retreat with the White Army across Siberia. With the end of the Civil War, he ended up in Manchuria and was discharged on May 12, 1923. Having lost everything, including his family, he set to organizing a choir to earn a living. As Manchuria included a large Russian population prior to the war that supported and operated the Trans-Siberian Railway short cuts to Vladivostok, a Russian-based lifestyle was available for his choir to work in. Indeed, the Harbin Archdiocese was active, as the situation in Russia deteriorated, including supporting the Church of Japan.

After the Great Kantō earthquake of September 1, 1923, severely damaged the Holy Resurrection Cathedral in Tokyo, the then Archbishop Sergius often visited Harbin to obtain support for restoring the Cathedral. Amongst his activities, Sergius was looking for a capable leader for the choir at the cathedral. Among the candidates that the archbishop interviewed he liked the music of Victor Pokrovsky who was directing the choir at the Holy Theotokos Church in Harbin. Invited by the archbishop, Victor moved to Japan in 1924 to form a full-scale choir at the Holy Resurrection Cathedral and to introduce the new Russian masterpieces, such as those by Arkhangelsky and Kastalsky.

For the next sixteen years Victor was deeply engaged in developing a first-class choir and learning Japanese so as to translate and arrange the new masterpieces for the choir. During this time he found time to marry a Russian young lady, but suffered tragedy when she died in childbirth, leaving him a son to raise. A couple of years later he married again, to a young lady from Harbin with whom he had two daughters.

He and the archbishop, later named Metropolitan of All Japan, worked closely as the choir developed and the Cathedral was restored, until in 1940 the militaristic government, championing extreme nationalism, forced the non-Japanese leaders in the Church of Japan to "retire." Now, Victor searched for a new position. He was invited to a position in San Francisco, but the attack on Pearl Harbor occurred before their ship could leave Japan. Thus, he and his family spent the war in Japan, first living in Yokohoma and then later during and after the war in Karuizawa in the Japanese Alps. The last time they saw Metr. Sergius was when he came to Yokohoma during the summer of 1943 to baptize their second daughter. But, in the chaos of the war Victor was able to travel from Karuizawa to attend Sergius' funeral.

The war years proved to be very difficult, often living a starvation diet and, for Victor, an arrest on spying charges. It was many years before the family could return to Tokyo, but after returning Victor was invited by the new ruling bishop, Bishop Ireney, to resume his position directing the Holy Resurrection Cathedral choir. He restored the choir and again continued the work that was interrupted in 1940. Then in 1962, Victor, with his wife and younger daughter, immigrated to the United States where he led choirs in a number of parishes before retiring in 1972 in Vienna, Virginia. He died on February 12, 1990, and is buried at St. Tikhon's Orthodox Monastery (South Canaan, Pennsylvania), a place that he said reminded him of the Russia he left so many years before.

== Musical Work ==
Much of the following is based upon a study of Pokrovsky's musical work by Maria Junko Matsushima, of the Holy Annunciation Church in Nagoya, Japan.

Victor Pokrovsky was 27 years old when he assumed his duties under Metropolitan Sergius. As with the earlier Russian missionaries, St. Nicholas of Japan and Metr. Sergius himself, he began his work first learning the Japanese language as the grammatical and syllabical differences between Japanese and Slavonic made it difficult to translate and fit words to the musical notes. This was hard work, and in accomplishing this task he was assisted for many years by Father Job Hibi and a seminary student Jacob who later was ordained Father Jacob. He frequently worked until two or three o'clock in the morning.

He worked hard developing the cathedral choir, and in this work he also had the full support of Sergius. He was strict in his rehearsals, sometimes bringing some of the young women singers to tears. Rehearsals were held twice a week, Wednesday evenings and Sunday afternoons. Often Sergius sat in back, listening to their singing, and even chided some lazy choir members.

In time the choir recognized this discipline and personally came to Victor to acknowledge his intent. Victor worked carefully on the timing and the flow of the services. He coordinated tones with the clergy so they and the choir remained in harmony. Yet, during the service he could quickly adjust the choir's pitch to fit the intonation of the clergy when necessary. For Victor, the services were a whole, not a bunch of pieces. In this even, Metropolitan Sergius was careful, often heard coordinating on which Cherubic hymn version Victor would sing that day so that he could decide on his pitch.

The choir's repertory expanded quickly. They sang the music of Tchaikovsky, Smolensky, Strokin, Chesnokov, Arkhangelsky, and Kastalsky. Some years later, thanks to his pupil Tito Kato, Victor's music was published in Osaka. There were some 75 titles, and many of them, for example, Smolensky�?'s Paschal Stichera, and Makarov�?'s The Angel Cried, are still sung in many churches in Japan.

The hard work of these early years came together in the singing at the re-consecration ceremony for the rebuilt Holy Resurrection Cathedral on December 15, 1929. Afterwards Metropolitan Sergius praised him: "Victor Alexandrovich Pokrovsky, a great choir director who has done hard work since 1924. His name will be kept in the history of music in Japan. Our choir[s] are not only good singers but artistic and full of spirit." (Tokyo Holy Resurrection Cathedral and the Earthquake, by Metr. Sergius.)

== Sources ==
Maria Junko Matsushima: A Russian Émigré Church Musician - Victor Pokrovsky, his Life and Music: Kazan, Manchuria, Tokyo, America, PSALM Notes, March 2005.
