= Nikolay Nikolsky =

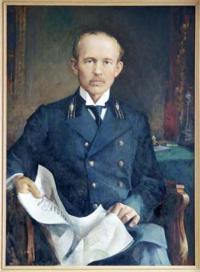
Nikolay Vasilyevich Nikolsky

Nikolay Vasilyevich Nikolsky (19 May 1878 – 2 November 1961) was a Russian historian, ethnographer, folklorist, lexicographer of half-Russian (mother) half- Chuvash (father) ethnicity.

== Biography ==
Nikolay Vasilyevich Nikolsky was born in a village of Yurmekeykino, Yadrinsk uyezd (today Morgaushsky District of Chuvash Republic) in the family of surveyor. After finishing the local Shumatov zemstvo College he enrolled in the Theological College in Cheboksary. After that he studied also in the Theological Seminary in Kazan which Nikolsky finished in 1899 and then continuing to study at the Theological Academy of Kazan. Upon graduation of the academy he obtained the title of magistrate and his dissertation by the academy council was recognized as the best to reflect the history of Russian church.

By the referral of the Kazan Academy the ober-procuror of Holy Synod appointed Nikolsky as the instructor at the Theological Seminary in Irkutsk. He rejected the appointment as he had intentions to study history of Chuvash culture. Therefore he stayed in Kazan where he found much less paid job as the observer over the students at the local seminary until November 1906. Simultaneously he worked as an instructor of the Chuvash language and the history and ethnography of Chuvash people in the Kazan Academy until 1917.

In the 1900s he published numerous of his research of the Chuvash folklore, culture, as well as the Russian-Chuvash dictionary. In January 1906 he started to publish the Chuvash newspaper Hypar (News -engl.). In November 1906 he became a history instructor at the Kazan Teaching Seminary along with the duty of a local librarian. From all those positions he was relieved in 1910 when there were some revolutionary activities going in Kazan. In 1907 Nikolsky was accepted as the teacher of Chuvash language in the Kazan Theological Seminary where he worked until 1916.

In 1915 he was accepted as private docent at the Kazan University and was allowed to read lectures as part of the "History course of Christian Enlightenment". In 1920 Nikolsky published a book on the "History of Mari". Later in 1929 he published series of other historical books on the Chuvash, Mordva, and Mari cultures. By the end of the 1950s he was specializing in the local folklore publishing series of ethnic fairy-tales and mythological stories based on the local culture. In 1947 by the order of the Ministry of the Higher Education of the Soviet Union he was awarded the science degree of doctor of history. Nikolsky died on 2 November 1961 in Kazan.
