= Dainius Kamaitis =

Lithuanian diplomat

Dainius Petras Kamaitis
- Born: February 2, 1965 (age 61); Kaunas, Lithuania
- Education: Vilnius Gediminas Technical University
- Occupation: diplomat

Dainius Kamaitis is the Lithuanian diplomat, former Ambassador Extraordinary and Plenipotentiary of the Republic of Lithuania to Japan, the Philippines, Australia and New Zealand.

During 2007–2012, he was the Lithuanian Governor to Asia-Europe Foundation (ASEF).

In 2003, he was awarded with The Cross of the Knight of the Order for Merits to Lithuania.

D.Kamaitis is the initiator and key coordinator of a series of events held under the Lithuania-Japan architecture forum known as East-East. For this initiative, he was nominated by the Embassy of Japan in Lithuania and the Čiurlionis Foundation for the award with the Čiurlionis Cup 2013 for having contributed to cultural relations between Japan and Lithuania.

In 2019, the Government of Japan awarded D.Kamaitis with The Order of the Rising Sun, Gold and Silver Star, in recognition to his contribution to strengthening and promoting friendly relations between Japan and Lithuania.

Preceded by Algirdas Kudzys	Ambassador of Lithuania to Japan; 2006-2011	Succeeded by Egidijus Meilūnas
Preceded by Algirdas Kudzys	Ambassador of Lithuania to the Philippines; 2007-2011	Succeeded by Egidijus Meilūnas
Preceded by none	Ambassador of Lithuania to Australia; 2008-2011	Succeeded by Egidijus Meilūnas
Preceded by none	Ambassador of Lithuania to New Zealand; 2008-2011	Succeeded by Egidijus Meilūnas
