= Vulcanus in Japan =

The Vulcanus in Japan program is an employment-oriented exchange program for students from the European Union. It was established in 1997 by the EU-Japan Centre for Industrial Cooperation, a joint venture between the European Commission and the Japanese Ministry of Economy, Trade and Industry. Its main objective is to promote industrial cooperation between European and Japanese companies.

== Goals ==
The Vulcanus in Japan program consists of industrial placements for EU students. The participants are selected from among the best applicants (about 40 out of 800 to 1,000 each year). To be eligible, students must be in between the last official year of university studies (3 undergraduate + 1) and the penultimate year of PhD in the fields of Engineering, Science or Architecture. The final objective is to train a pool of future executives capable of interacting socially and professionally with Japanese people, by familiarizing them with the Japanese corporate culture.

== Students ==
The following table provides information on the number of annual participants by country, as well as the total number of participants since the launch of the Vulcanus program in Japan.

Number of participants per year and country
Country	1997	1998	1999	2000	2001	2002	2003	2004	2005	2006	2007	2008	2009	Total
Austria	0	0	0	1	1	1	0	0	0	1	2	0	1	7
Belgium	1	1	0	0	1	3	1	1	2	1	1	0	0	12
Bulgaria	0	0	0	0	0	0	0	0	0	0	1	0	0	1
Czech Republic	0	0	0	0	0	0	0	1	2	0	0	0	2	5
Denmark	1	0	1	0	0	1	0	0	0	0	0	0	0	3
Estonia	0	0	0	0	0	0	0	0	0	0	0	1	1	2
Finland	1	1	0	1	1	1	1	0	3	2	1	1	1	14
France	2	2	2	2	1	3	4	7	5	5	2	2	5	42
Alemania	0	0	2	2	0	1	4	0	1	1	0	1	0	14
Greece	1	1	0	1	1	1	0	0	0	0	1	0	0	6
Hungary	0	0	0	0	0	0	0	0	1	1	1	1	1	5
Ireland	2	1	1	0	0	0	0	0	0	0	1	0	0	5
Italy	1	1	0	2	3	1	3	2	2	7	9	10	10	51
Letonia	0	0	0	0	0	0	0	0	1	0	0	0	0	1
Lituania	0	0	0	0	0	0	0	2	1	2	1	0	2	8
Malta	0	0	0	0	0	0	0	0	1	0	0	0	0	1
Netherlands	1	2	1	3	0	0	0	0	0	1	1	0	0	9
Poland	0	0	0	0	0	0	0	3	3	4	6	8	10	34
Portugal	1	1	0	0	0	1	1	1	1	3	1	0	0	10
Romania	0	0	0	0	0	0	0	0	0	0	0	0	3	3
Slovakia	0	0	0	0	0	0	0	1	0	3	2	0	0	6
Spain	1	2	2	2	2	2	10	5	8	6	7	10	10	67
Sweden	1	1	1	2	2	2	2	1	0	0	0	0	0	12
United Kingdom	1	2	0	0	0	0	0	0	0	3	1	1	0	8
Total European Union	14	15	10	16	12	17	26	24	31	40	40	35	46	326

== Requirements ==
To be eligible, students must meet the following requirements:

- be an EU citizen;
- be registered at an EU university on a postgraduate or undergraduate course in at least the fourth year;
- be able to take a year out;
- be a student in one of the following fields:
  - Engineering;
  - Sciences;
  - Architecture.

High proficiency in the English language is a sine qua non-requirement for applicants.

None of the work performed by a participant in a hosting company, even related to research activities, can be used as thesis material.

== Application and selection ==
The selection of participants is performed in two steps:

First, shortlisted students will be chosen based on the documents provided (see below). In the second phase, the final decisions are taken by the host companies.

The first selection is performed by judging the following documents, which are required for the application:

- Application form
- Curriculum Vitae
- motivation letter
- Recommendation letter (written by a university professor)
- All the grades obtained at the university
- University grading system
- Attitude towards Japan and EU-Japan relations

Students' international profiles, motivation and technical skills will be the critical information in the above list of documents.

After the first selection is performed, the students are given a list of host companies from which they may pick one or two — one being already chosen by the judging board. Then the applicants must write a dedicated motivation letter for each of the host companies, which will be sent directly to the human resource department of the company. These companies perform the final selection.

== Content of the program ==
All the participants in the Vulcanus in Japan programm follow:

- A four-month intensive Japanese language course, which is supplemented by

- seminars related to Japan (culture, society, economy, history, etc.)
- company and factory visits
- cultural activities

- an eight-month internship in a Japanese company

=== Japanese language course ===
As Japanese language proficiency is not a requirement for the applicants (even if appreciated), the first part of the Vulcanus in Japan program consists of a four-month intensive Japanese language course, at the rate of 5–6 hours per day, five days a week, taught by the teachers of a private Japanese language school. Participants who have never learned Japanese are provided with the basic knowledge useful for daily life in Japan and basic communication in a Japanese company. During the language course, students learn about the language and Japanese culture, history, living habits, etc.

Participants with some Japanese language skills follow classes adapted to their level.

==== Seminars ====
During the first four months of the program, participants follow seminars of about 3 hours each, led by teachers from renowned universities or companies. These seminars are related to Japanese culture, society, economy and history, and help the participants to understand the country better.

==== Company and factory visits ====
Depending on the program year, visits to leading companies are organized by the program for the participants to study and learn about the Japanese industry. Here is a non-exhaustive list of the companies and factories visited in the past:

- Hitachi
- Panasonic
- Sanyo
- Toppan Printing
- Toyota
- Komatsu Spring
- Nissan
- Yamatake Corporation (ja:山武 (企業))
- Fujitsu Ltd.

==== Cultural activities ====
Some of the cultural activities are organized by the EU-Japan Centre, and some by the schools organizing the language courses. They include:

- Calligraphy
- soba, tempura cooking, preparation of sushi, etc.
- Wind chime (fūrin) making
- Tea ceremony
- Sumo tournament watching
- Indigo dye
- Zazen

Activities vary depending on the year of participation, but they are intended for participants to learn more about Japanese culture.

=== Internship ===
The internships start in January and last till August. Placement, accommodation, tasks and schedules vary greatly and depend on the hosting company. During the internship students are required to write monthly reports to keep track of their records.

All participants receive information on local Japanese language schools, but the continuation of language studies is voluntary.

== Scholarship ==
The participants are awarded a pro-rata grant of around Yen 1.900.000, that may vary over the years, to cover the cost of travel to and from Japan and living expenses in Japan. The language course, the seminar, the accommodation in Japan for the entire stay are provided free of charge.

Accommodation is provided and financed by the hosting company for the whole duration of the program.

== See also ==
- Student exchange
- European Commission
- Japanese Ministry of Economy, Trade & Industry
