= Anatolie Tihai =

Bessarabian hieromonk (1839–1893)

Photo supposedly of the Bessarabian missionary Anatolie Tihai in Japan

Father Anatolie Tihai (23 November 1839 – 1893) was a Romanian hieromonk from Russian Bessarabia who went to Japan in the early 1870s to assist Fr. Nicholas in his missionary work in Japan. Initially, the future St. Nicholas of Japan assigned Fr. Anatolie to his original church in Hakodate on Hokkaido island in northern Japan. During his years in Japan before he returned to Russia due to illness, Archimandrite Anatolie organised and taught schools in Hakodate and Osaka as well as serving as dean of the language school and organizing the Tokyo Orthodox Seminary in Tokyo.

== Life ==
Fr. Anatolie was originally from Bessarabia. He was born 23 November 1839 in Tărăsăuți, Hotin district (later known as Khotinsky Uyezd) in the northern part of Moldova (Bessarabia). He graduated from Chişinău Theological Seminary and from Kiev Theological Academy. He lived on Mount Athos for four years before he was assigned to assist Fr. Nicholas with his mission work in Japan.

The hieromonk Anatolie arrived in Japan during December 1871 while Fr. Nicholas' activities were still centered in Hakodate. After reviewing the status of the missionary effort in Japan with Fr. Anatolie, Fr. Nicholas assigned Fr. Anatolie to the existing parish at Hakodate, thus continuing the community that had formed there. This allowed Fr. Nicholas to move his activities to Edo (Tokyo).

In 1873, Fr. Anatolie established the Motomachi Orthodox Primary School in Hakodate where he taught for the next seven years. By 1880, the school had an enrollment of 300. In 1880, Fr. Anatolie was raised to the rank of Archimandrite and also was called by Bp. Nicholas to come to the Kanda Surugadai headquarters in Tokyo to become the dean of the language school and the newly organised seminary. Here he taught theology to the seminarians and assisted Bp. Nicholas. As the Mission expanded, Fr. Anatolie was assigned in 1882 to organise a mission school in Osaka.

In the late 1880s Archimandrite Anatolie's health began to fail, and in the summer of 1890 he returned to Russia where he reposed in 1893.

== See also ==
- Iacob Tihai, his younger brother
