= Japan–European Union Comprehensive Economic Partnership Agreement =

Free trade agreement

Economic Partnership Agreement between the European Union and Japan
- EU (dark green); Japan (orange)
- Type: Trade agreement
- Signed: 17 July 2018
- Location: Tokyo, Japan
- Effective: 1 February 2019
- Signatories: European Union; Japan

The Japan-EU Economic Partnership Agreement (EPA, also called Japan-EU Free Trade Agreement, JEFTA) is in force since 1 February 2019 after having been negotiated from 2013 to 2017. The EPA is the EU's largest bilateral free trade agreement, covering 30 percent of the world's gross domestic product (GDP) and 40 percent of global trade. Japan's prime minister at the time, Shinzō Abe, said the deal signified the creation of "the birth of the world's largest, free, industrialised economic zone".

== See also ==
- Japan–United Kingdom Comprehensive Economic Partnership Agreement

== Links ==
- Full text in English, French, and German (EUR-Lex)
- Full text in Japanese and English (Ministry of Foreign Affairs Japan)
