= Austria–Japan relations =

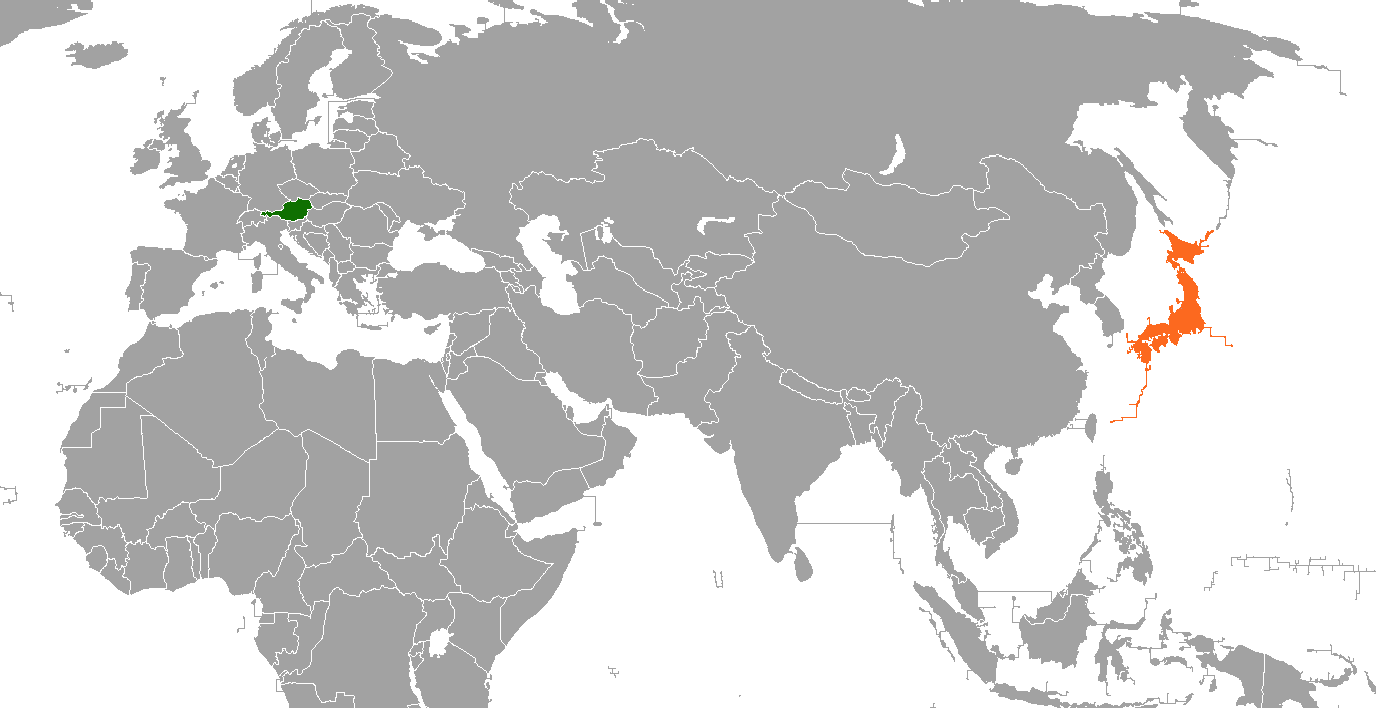
- Austria: Japan

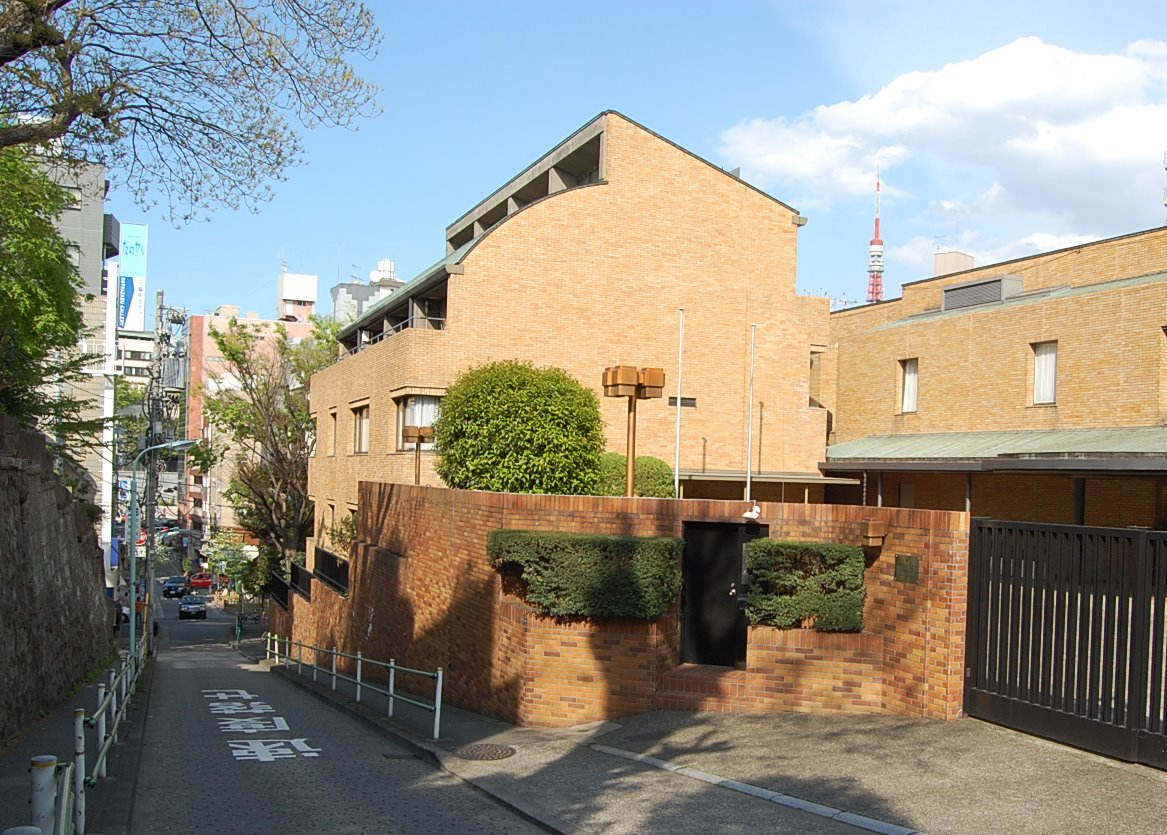
Embassy of Austria in Tokyo

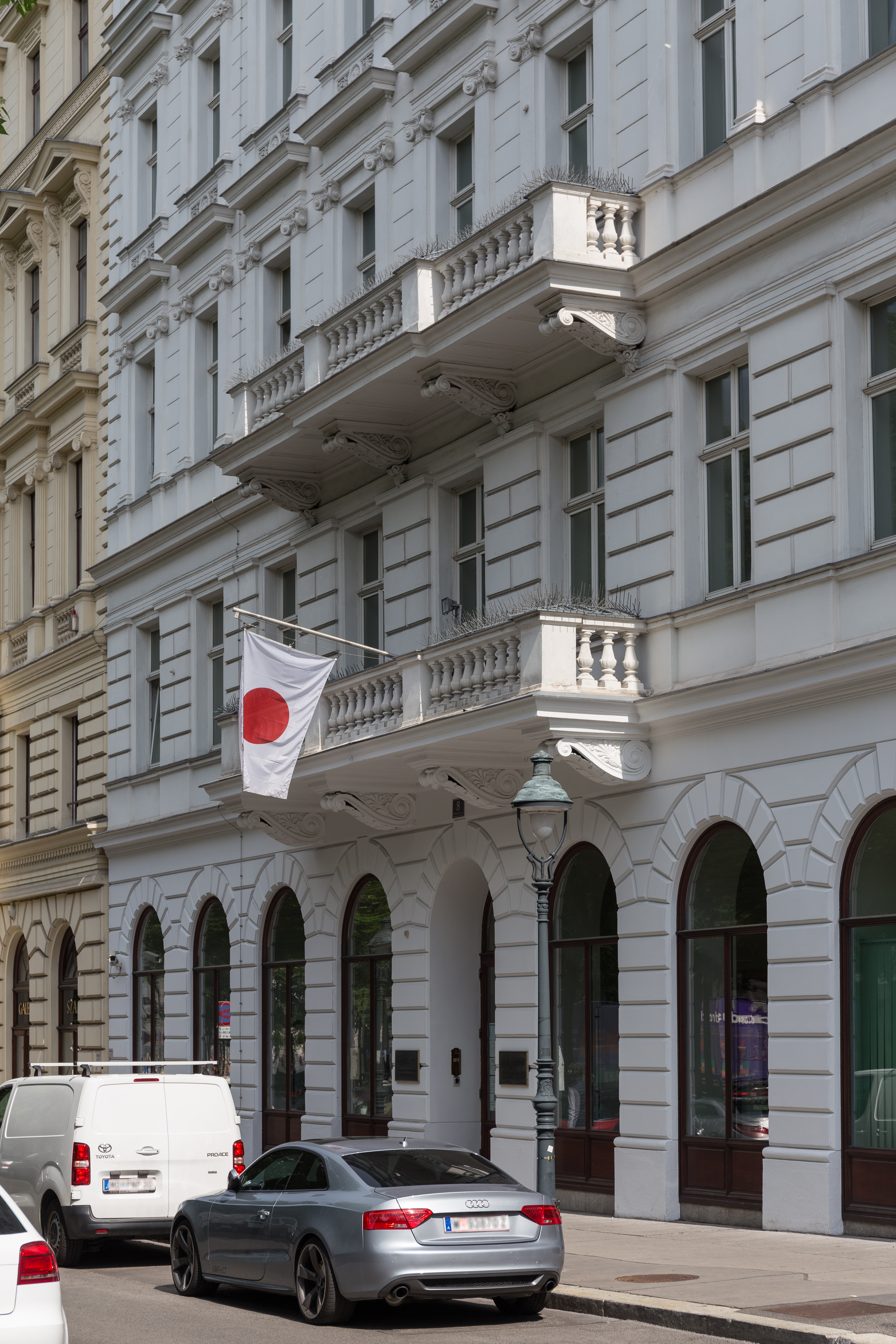
Embassy of Japan in Vienna

Foreign relations exist between Austria and Japan. Both countries established diplomatic relations in 1869, that lasted until severed in 1914 due to the First World War. Relations were reestablished following the war. Austria has an embassy in Tokyo. Japan has an embassy in Vienna.

== History ==
In 1869, the first Austro-Hungarian diplomatic mission arrived at Japan, headed by Baron Anton Freiherr von Petz. Following negotiations, the first Austro-Japanese treaty of friendship was concluded on October 18 of the same year.

In June 1999, the President of Austria Thomas Klestil paid a state visit to Japan. It was the first state visit of an Austrian President to Japan.

In 2007, Japan was Austria's third most important overseas trade partner.

== Resident diplomatic missions ==
- Austria has an embassy in Tokyo.
- Japan has an embassy in Vienna.

== See also ==
- Foreign relations of Austria
- Foreign relations of Japan
