= Nikolay Ilminsky =

Russian Turkic linguist

Nikolay Ivanovich Il’minskiy
- Николай Иванович Ильминский
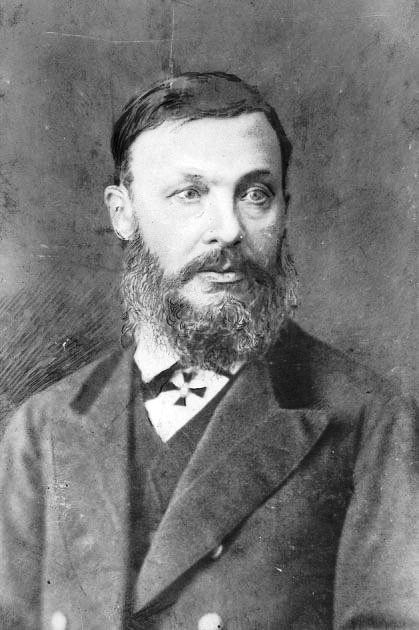
- Born: 5 May [O.S. 23 April] 1822; Penza, Penza Governorate, Russian Empire
- Died: 8 January [O.S. 27 December 1891] 1892; Kazan, Kazan Governorate, Russian Empire
- Resting place: Arskoe Cemetery, Kazan, Russia
- Education: Kazan Theological Academy
- Occupations: Turkology oriental studies Biblical studies
- Employer(s): Kazan Theological Academy, Imperial Kazan University
- Known for: orientalist, pedagog, missionary
- Notable work: Ilminsky's alphabet
- Awards

Nikolai Ivanovich Il'minskii (Russian: Николай Иванович Ильминский; 1822–1892) was a Russian professor of Turkic languages at the Kazan University. He is known as the "Enlightener of Natives", due to his work with native Tatars on behalf of the Russian Orthodox Church.

Following a highly successful career as an academic linguist, he devoted himself to missionary work on behalf of the Russian Orthodox Church. Based around his view that mother tongue instruction was the key factor in ensuring that animists, he developed the Ilminsky Method. In 1863, Ilminsky started teaching Oriental languages at the Kazan Theological Seminary, working on teaching materials for Tatars in the Tatar language. It was there that Iliminsky deployed his idea of mother tongue instruction with the Ilminsky method. After this he helped co-found the translation commission under the brotherhood of St. Gurias. Which by 1904, produced works in 23 different languages. Ilminsky is also described by Nicholas Zernov as being a major contributor to translations of the Bible to many Asiatic languages. Nicholas also comments that Ilmisky could speak Arabic, Persian, Turkish, Tatar, Cheremis, Chuvash, Kirgiz, Mordvin, Yakut and more Asiatic languages.

He worked closely with the educator Ilya Ulyanov and his model of education, described as "national in form, Orthodox in content" can be considered an influence on Ulyanov's son Vladimir Lenin who developed an approach which was described as "national in form, socialist in content".
