= Manabu Chiba =

Japanese architect from Tokyo

- Born: 1960 (age 65–66)
- Education: University of Tokyo
- Occupation: Architect
- Practice: Chiba Gaken Sekkeika Jimushō
- Buildings: Wayō Jyoshi Sakura Seminaru Hausu MESH Moudoken no sato Fuji hānesu

Manabu Chiba (千葉 学, Chiba Manabu; born 1960) is a Japanese architect from Tokyo. He received his master's degree from the University of Tokyo in 1987. He worked at Nihon Sekkei Inc. until 1993, when he became partner of Factor N Associates. He established Chiba Manabu Architects as principal in 2001.

He was assistant professor for Tadao Ando and The University of Tokyo, where he is an associate professor at the graduate school of architecture, faculty of engineering. He has also been guest professor at ETH Zurich (2009–2010).

His designs range from residential and commercial to office buildings. His work has received recognition such as the JIA (The Japan Institute of Architects) Award for Best Young Architect (1998) and several winning prizes in design competitions within Japan.
