= Iacob Tihai =

Romanian Orthodox composer and missionary

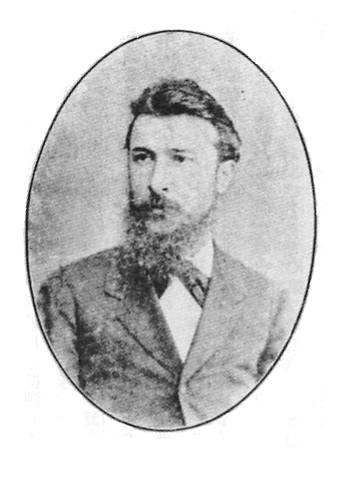
Iacob Tihai

Iacob Tihai (Russian: Яков Дмитриевич Тихай) was a Romanian Orthodox composer, liturgist, and missionary from Russian Bessarabia.

With Dmitri Lvovsky, he established a liturgical music school in Tokyo on the grounds of the Japanese mission to educate Japanese Christians in the new forms of music and to teach Japanese choir leaders for the new parishes.

== Life ==
Не graduated from the Chișinău Theological Seminary.

He was recommended by his older brother, archimandrite Anatolie (Tihai), to then archimandrite Nicholas of Japan, and became Fr. Nicholas' principal arranger of Russian liturgical music to Japanese translations during the early decades of the Japanese mission.

Iacob Tihai came from the Romanian village of Tărăsăuți, in the Hotin district in northern Moldova (Bessarabia), and arrived to Japan in early 1874 to assist his brother the Archimandrite Anatoly at his assignment to the parish in Hakodate, Japan. Fr. Anatoly had succeeded Fr. Nicholas in the Hakodate parish when Fr. Nicholas transferred his mission headquarters to Tokyo. Later, Tihai was invited by Fr. Nicholas to serve as choirmaster at Suragadai Kanda.

Under the guidance of Bp. Nicholas, Tihai arranged the music for almost all the needed texts used in the Divine Liturgy, major feasts, baptism, funerals, the first week of Great Lent, and Passion Week. As his successor, Victor Pokrovsky under Metr. Sergius needed to do, Tihai found it necessary to change the music to meet the different sense and structure of the Japanese language.

Tihai married Yelena Yokoi, daughter of a prominent Japanese family, in 1876.

During a visit to Odessa in 1887, Tihai died. His wife and children later returned to Japan.
