= Japan Institute of Architects =

Japanese organization for architects

The Japan Institute of Architects (JIA; 日本建築家協会, Nihon kenchikuka kyōkai) is a voluntary organization for architects in Japan, and an affiliated organization of the Union Internationale des Architectes (UIA). The institution was founded in May 1987 and includes round about 4,100 members today.

The organization was founded as the result of a merger between two different Japanese architect associations, the Japan Architects Association (JAA) and the Japan Federation of Professional Architects Association (JFPAA) in 1987. The JIA's principal aim is to define and promote the social and legal status of professional architects in Japan. The association consists of the ten regional chapters Hokkaidō, Tōhoku, Kantō-Kōshin'etsu, Tōkai, Hokuriku, Kinki, Chūgoku, Shikoku, Kyūshū and Okinawa.

== Honors of the JIA ==
- JIA Award
- JIA Grand Prix
- JIA Young Architect Award
- JIA Sustainable Architecture Award
- JIA 25 Years Award (every two years)
- JIA Architect of the Year
