= Japan–Lithuania relations =

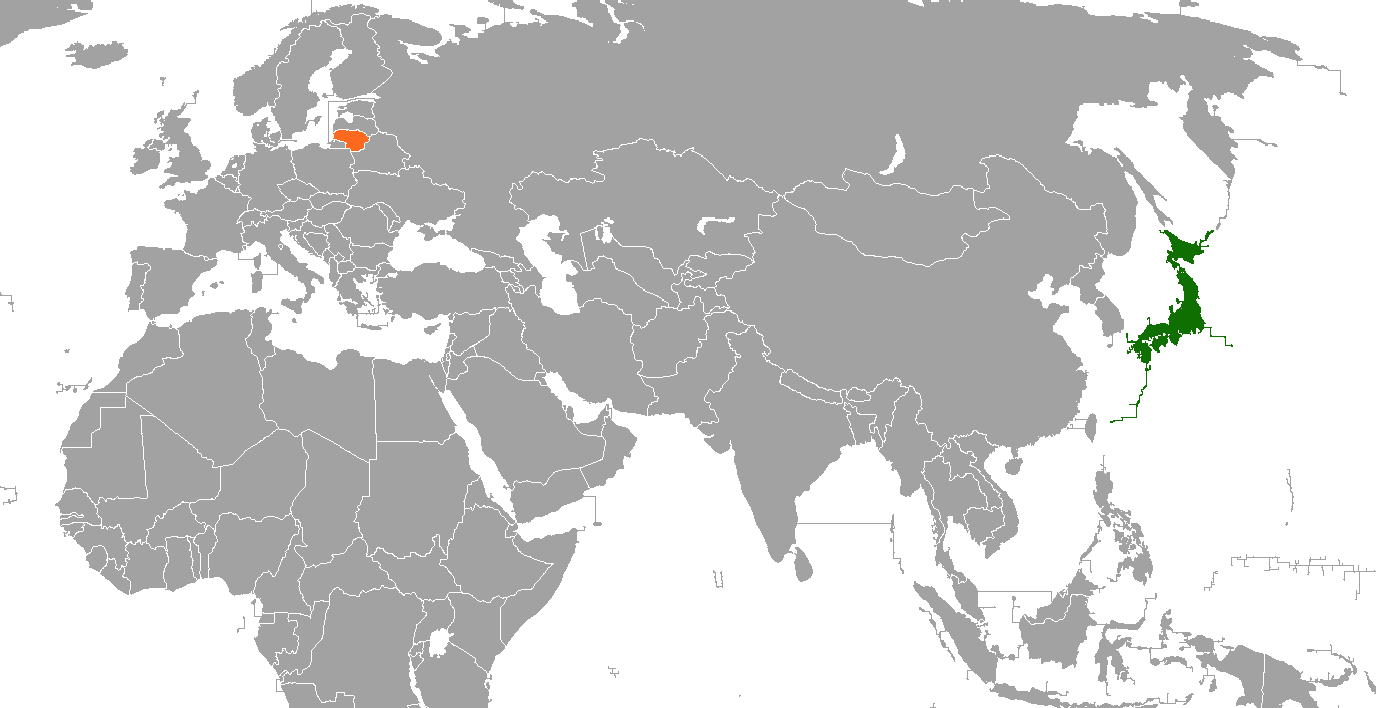

- Japan: Lithuania

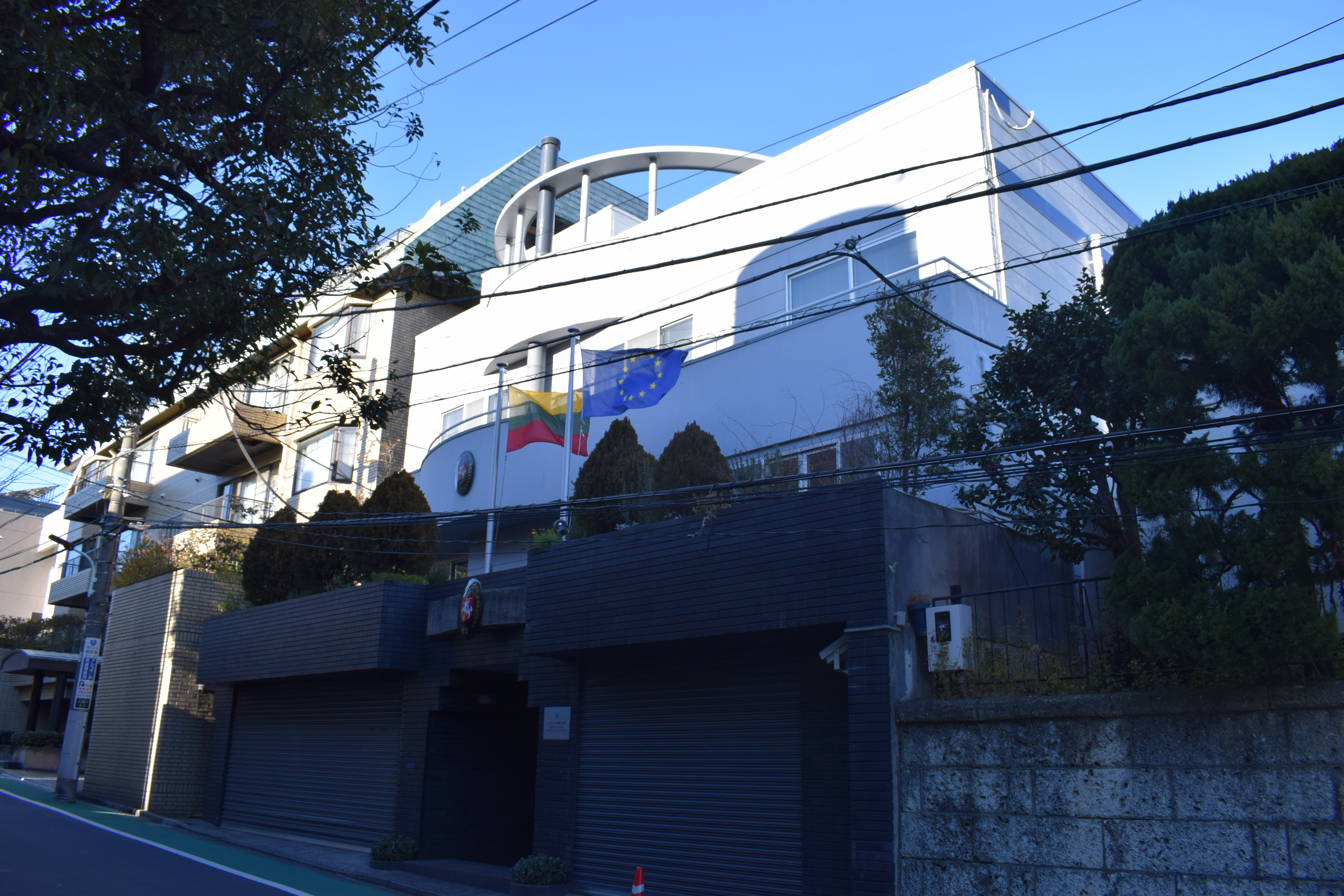
Embassy of Lithuania in Tokyo, Japan

Japan–Lithuania relations are the bilateral relations between Japan and Lithuania. Both nations are members of the Organisation for Economic Co-operation and Development. Japan has an embassy in Vilnius, and Lithuania has an embassy in Tokyo.

In February 1992, the Embassy of Japan to Lithuania was established in nearby Denmark, and in January 1997, it was moved to Vilnius. In June 1998, the Embassy of Lithuania to Japan was established in Tokyo.

== History ==
Sugihara House, the former Japanese Consulate in Kaunas

=== Interwar period ===
The beginning of the relationship between Japan and Lithuania is conisdered to be January 3, 1919, which was the date when Japan recognized Lithuania de facto. On February 8, 1929, the agreement by which visas were abolished was signed between Japan and Lithuania, while in 1930 the Trade and shipping agreement was signed.

=== During the period of the Molotov–Ribbentrop Pact ===
On November 23, 1939, the Japanese consulate was established, led by Vice Consul Chiune Sugihara. However, due to the Soviet occupation, the consulate was shut the following year. In 1940, Chiune Sugihara assisted the flight of Jewish refugees from the imminent Nazi invasion of Lithuania by issuing them transit visas from the consulate in Kaunas, despite instructions from the Japanese Government attempting to block his actions. Up to 10,000 refugees were saved with this action.

=== Modern relations ===
There is a significant close partnership between the city of Kuji and Klaipėda, established in 1989.

Japan de facto re-recognized Lithuania on September 6, 1991, and a month later, diplomatic relations were re-established between these countries. In 1997, the Embassy of Japan was established in Vilnius and in 1998, the Embassy of Lithuania was established in Tokyo.

In March 2016, Japan and Lithuania agreed to cooperate on nuclear safety.

== Military ties ==
In August 2016, Training Squadron vessels of the Japan Maritime Self-Defense Force Kashima, Asagiri and Setoyuki sailed into Klaipėda port, to celebrate the 25th anniversary of the re-establishment of diplomatic relations between this sovereign republic in the Baltic region and the maritime nation in the Far East. The Minister of Foreign Affairs of Lithuania, Linas Antanas Linkevičius, welcomed the Japanese vessels and their steadfast partnership based on the same fundamental values since 1991, as well as referring to the diplomat Chiune Sugihara, who served as the Japanese Vice-Consul at Kaunas from 1939 to 1940 and granted visas to thousands of Jewish and other minority refugees in his short term of office. The JMSDF Training Squadron also visited Lithuanian Military Academy, where some students and officers train Kendo, a modern Japanese martial arts descended from Bushido and swordsmanship. On August 10, a sports exchange event between Japanese and Lithuanian officers was held at the military academy, and the Lithuanian team won the Kendo match against the Japanese team.

== High level visits ==
=== High-level visits from Japan to Lithuania ===
In May 2007, the Emperor and Empress of Japan, Akihito and Michiko, made an official visit to Lithuania.

In 13–14 January 2018, Japanese Prime Minister Shinzo Abe met with President Dalia Grybauskaitė and Prime Minister Saulius Skvernelis.

In 11–12 July 2023, Japanese Prime Minister Fumio Kishida attended the 2023 Vilnius NATO summit.

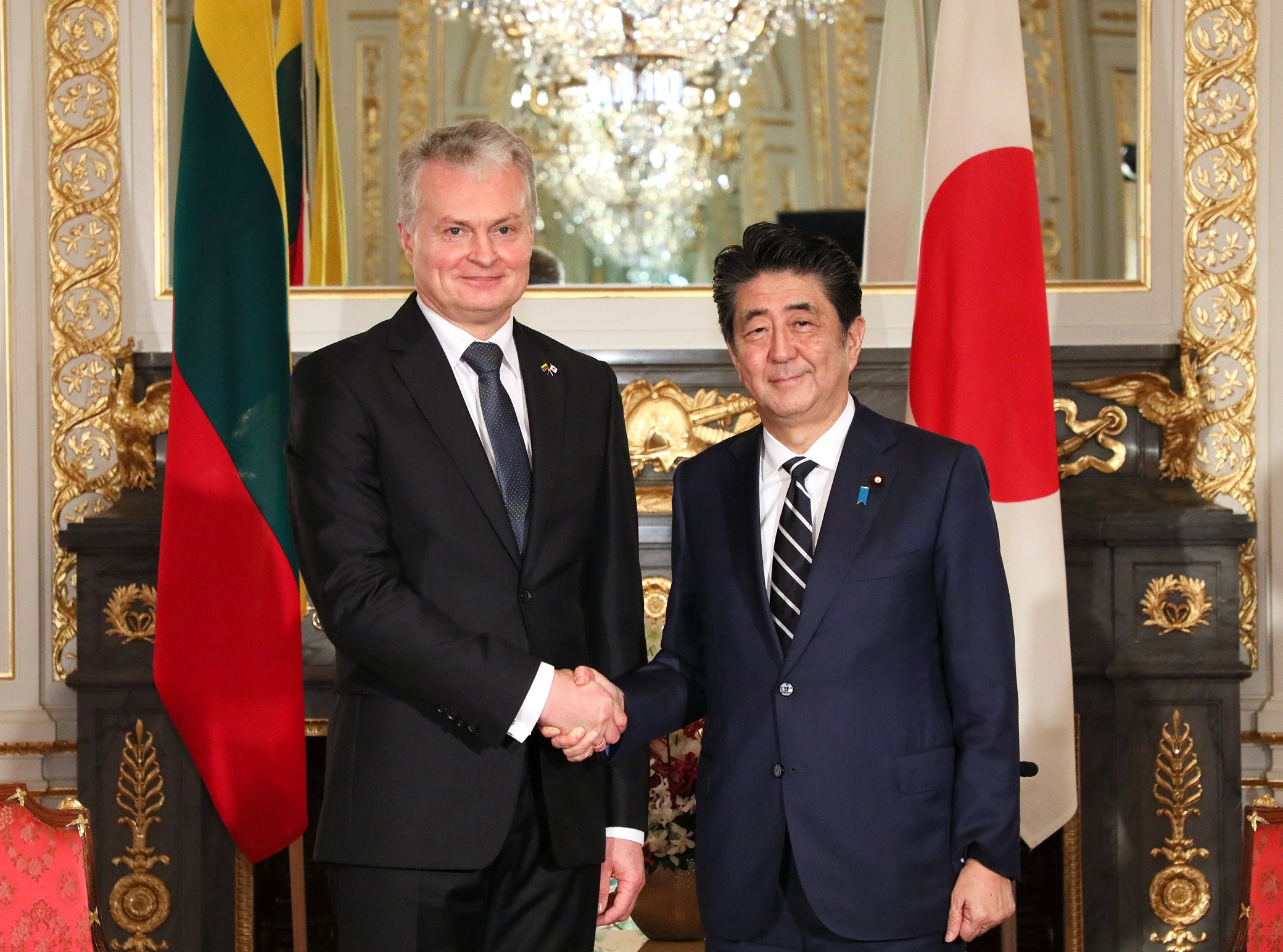
Lithuanian President Gitanas Nausėda meets with the Prime Minister of Japan Shinzo Abe in October 2019

=== High-level visits from Lithuania to Japan ===
In April 2001, Lithuanian President Valdas Adamkus paid an official visit to Japan, and on April 11, he held talks with Japanese Prime Minister Yoshiro Mori about their views on several issues that includes their bilateral relations, Japan–Russia relations and Lithuania's accession to EU and NATO.

In October 2019, Lithuanian President Gitanas Nausėda travelled to Tokyo to attend the enthronement of Japanese Emperor Naruhito

In June 2025, Lithuanian President Nausėda travelled to Tokyo to meet with Prime Minister Shigeru Ishiba, the two leaders also had a working dinner for approximately 90 minutes. and attended Expo 2025 in Osaka.

== Resident diplomatic missions ==
- Japan has an embassy in Vilnius.
- Lithuania has an embassy in Tokyo.

== See also ==
- Foreign relations of Japan
- Foreign relations of Lithuania
