= List of diplomatic missions in Japan =

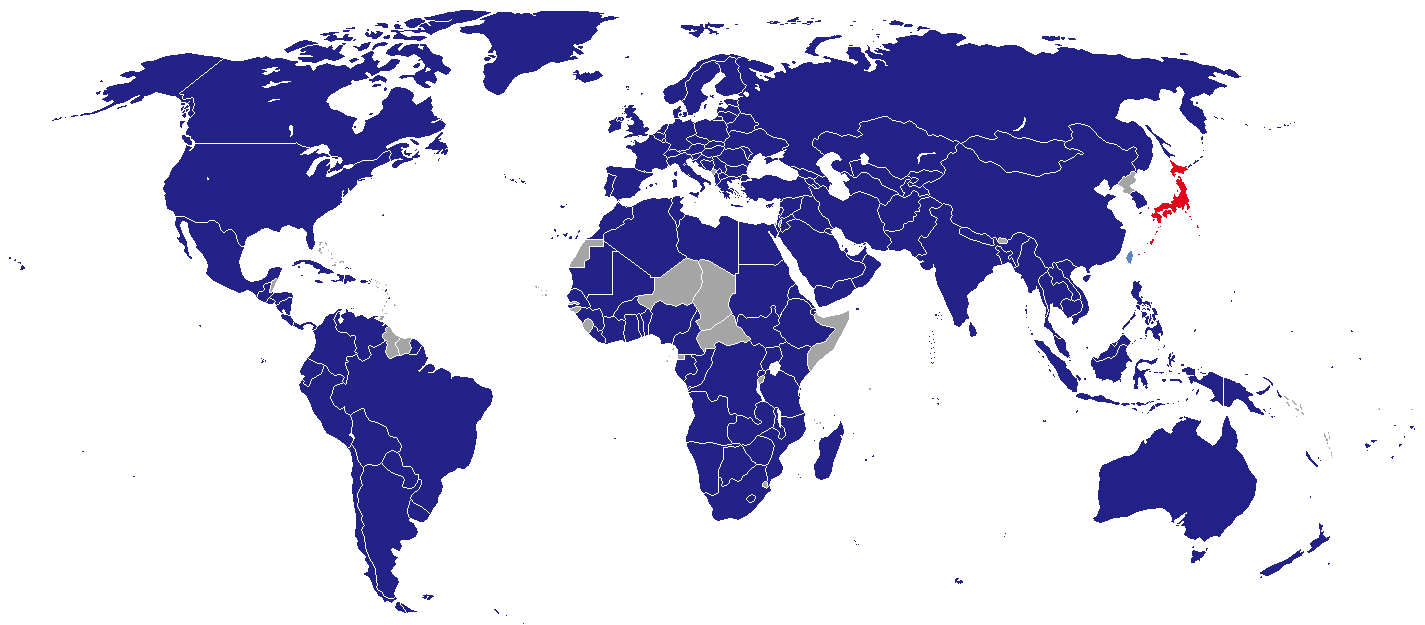
Map of diplomatic missions in Japan

This is a list of diplomatic missions in Japan. At present, the capital city of Tokyo hosts 155 embassies. A few other countries are accredited through their embassies in Beijing or elsewhere. This listing excludes honorary consulates.

== Embassies in Tokyo ==
This is a list of the 153 resident embassies in Tokyo.

Embassy	Location	Neighborhood	Image	Notes
Albania	6-4-8 Tsukiji, Chūō-ku, Tokyo 104-0045	Chuo		
Algeria	2-10-67 Mita, Meguro-ku, Tokyo 153-0062	Meguro		
Angola	2-10-24 Daizawa, Setagaya-ku, Tokyo 155-0032	Setagaya		
Argentina	2-14-14 Motoazabu, Minato-ku, Tokyo 106-0046	Minato		
Armenia	#230 Residence Viscountess, 1-11-36 Akasaka, Minato-ku, Tokyo 107-0052	Akasaka		
Australia	2-1-14 Mita, Minato-ku, Tokyo 108-8361	Minato		
Austria	1-1-20 Motoazabu, Minato-ku, Tokyo 106-0046	Minato		
Azerbaijan	1-19-15 Higashigaoka, Meguro-ku, Tokyo 152-0021	Meguro		
Bahrain	#710 Residence Viscountess, 1-11-36 Akasaka, Minato-ku, Tokyo 107-0052	Akasaka		
Bangladesh	3-29 Kioicho, Chiyoda-ku, Tokyo 102-0094	Kioi		
Belarus	5-6-32 Higaghigotanda Shinagawa-ku, Tokyo 141-0022	Shinagawa		
Belgium	Nibancho 5-4 Chiyoda-ku, Tokyo 102-0084	Nibancho		
Benin	8F S.I. Building, 1-11-14 Kasuga Bunkyō-ku, Tokyo 112-0003	Bunkyō		
Bolivia	32 Shibakoen Building, Room #802/#804, 3-4-30, Shibakoen, Minato-ku, Tokyo 105-0011	Minato		
Bosnia and Herzegovina	2F & 3F, 5-3-29 Minami-Azabu, Minato-ku, Tokyo 106-0047	Minato		
Botswana	6F EDGE Shiba Yonchome Building, 4-5-10 Shiba, Minato-ku, Tokyo 108-0014	Shiba		
Brazil	2-11-12, Kita-Aoyama, Minato-ku, Tokyo 107-8633	Minato		
Brunei Darussalam	6-5-2, Kitashinagawa, Shinagawa-ku, Tokyo 141-0001	Minato		
Bulgaria	5-36-3, Yoyogi, Shibuya-ku, Tokyo 151-0053	Yoyogi		
Burkina Faso	45-24 Ōyamachō, Shibuya City, Tokyo 151-0065	Shibuya		
Cambodia	8-6-9 Akasaka, Minato-ku, Tokyo 107-0052	Akasaka		
Cameroon	3-27-16 Nozawa, Setagaya-ku, Tokyo 154-0003	Setagaya		
Canada	7-3-38 Akasaka, Minato-ku, Tokyo 107-0052	Akasaka		
Chile	8F, Shibakoen Hanshin Bldg. 3-1-14, Shiba, Minato-ku, Tokyo 105-0014	Shiba		
China	3-4-33 Moto-Azabu, Minato-ku, Tokyo 106-0046	Minato		
Colombia	3-10-53 Kami-Osaki, Shinagawa-ku, Tokyo 141-0021	Shinagawa		
Democratic Republic of the Congo	2-9-21 Minami-Aoyama, Minato-ku, Tokyo 106-0047	Minato		
(Republic of the Congo) Congo, Republic of	3-16-4 Den-en-chōfu, Ōta-ku, Tokyo 150-0047	Ōta		
Costa Rica	R-West, 6-6-2 Roppongi, Minato-ku, Tokyo 106-0032	Minato		
(Ivory Coast) Côte d'Ivoire	2-19-12 Uehara, Shibuya-ku, Tokyo 151-0064	Shibuya		
Croatia	3-3-10 Hiroo, Shibuya-ku, Tokyo 150-0012	Shibuya		
Cuba	1-28-4 Higashi-Azabu, Minato-ku, Tokyo 106-0044	Minato		
Cyprus	4F, Europa House, 4-6-28 Minami-Azabu, Minato-ku, Tokyo 106-0047	Minato		The Embassy shares its chancery with the Delegation of the European Union.
Czech Republic	2-16-14 Hiroo, Shibuya-ku, Tokyo 150-0012	Shibuya		
Denmark	29-6 Sarugakucho, Shibuya-ku, Tokyo 150-0033	Shibuya		
Djibouti	5-18-10 Shimomeguro, Meguro-ku, Tokyo 153-0064	Meguro		
Dominican Republic	KU Gobancho Building No. 2F-A, 10 Gobancho, Chiyoda-ku, Tokyo 102-0076	Chiyoda		
Ecuador	Azabu Amerex Bldg, 8th Floor, 3-5-7, Azabudai, Minato-ku, Tokyo 106-0031	Minato		
Egypt	1-5-4 Aobadai, Meguro-ku, Tokyo 153-0042	Meguro		
El Salvador	Sebido Bldg. 3-20-5, Nishi-azabu, Minato-ku, Tokyo 106-0031	Minato		
Eritrea	4F ST bldg. 4-7-4 Shirokanedai, Minato-ku, Tokyo 108-0071	Minato		
Estonia	2-6-15, Jingumae, Shibuya-ku, Tokyo 150-0001	Shibuya		
Ethiopia	2F, Takanawa Kaisei Bldg., 3-4-1, Takanawa, Minato-ku, Tokyo 108-0074	Minato, Tokyo		
Fiji	2-3-5 Azabudai, Minato-ku, Tokyo 106-0041	Minato		
Finland	3-5-39 Minami-Azabu, Minato-ku, Tokyo 106-8561	Minato		
France	4-11-44 Minami-Azabu, Minato-ku, Tokyo 106-8514	Minato		
Gabon	1-34-11 Higashigaoka, Meguro-ku, Tokyo 152-0021	Meguro		
(Georgia (country)) Georgia	K2 bldg., 2-10-22, Kitaaoyama, Minatoku, Tokyo 107-0061	Minato		
Germany	4-5-10 Minami-Azabu, Minato-ku, Tokyo 106-0047	Minato		
Ghana	1-5-21 Nishi-Azabu, Minato-ku, Tokyo 106-0031	Minato		
Greece	3-16-30 Nishi-azabu, Minato-ku, Tokyo 106-0031	Minato		
Guatemala	Higashi-Azabu Abe Bldg. 4th Floor, 1-10-11, Higashi-Azabu, Minato-ku, Tokyo 106-0044	Minato		
Guinea	12-9 Hachiyamacho, Shibuya-ku, Tokyo 150-0035	Shibuya		
Haiti	Room: 906, No. 38 Kowa Bldg. 4-12-24 Nishi-Azabu Minato-ku, Tokyo 106-0031	Minato		
Holy See (Vatican City)	9-2 Sanban-cho, Chiyoda-ku, Tokyo 102-0075	Chiyoda		
Honduras	Higashi-Azabu Abe Building 5th Floor, 1-10-11, Higashi-Azabu, Minato-ku, Tokyo 106-0044	Minato		
Hungary	2-17-14 Mita, Minato-ku, Tokyo 108-0073	Minato		
Iceland	4-18-26 Takanawa, Minato-ku, Tokyo 108-0074	Minato		
India	2-2-11 Kudan-Minami, Chiyoda-ku, Tokyo	Chiyoda		
Indonesia	5-2-9 Higashi Gotanda, Shinagawa-ku, Tokyo	Shinagawa		
Iran	3-13-9 Minami-Azabu, Minato-ku, Tokyo 106-0047	Minato		
Iraq	La Vie en Palace Shoto, 14-6 Kamiyama-cho Shibuya-ku, Tokyo 150-0047 Tokyo, Shibuya City	Shibuya		
(Republic of Ireland) Ireland	Ireland House, 1-6 Yotsuya Honshiocho, Shinjuku-ku, Tokyo 160-0003	Shinjuku		
Israel	3 Nibancho, Chiyoda-ku, Tokyo 102-0084	Chiyoda		
Italy	2-5-4 Mita, Minato-ku, Tokyo 108-8302	Minato		
Jamaica	2-13-1 Motoazabu, Minato-ku, Tokyo 106-0046	Minato		
Jordan	39-8 Kamiyama-cho, Shibuya-ku, Tokyo 150-0047	Shibuya		
Kazakhstan	1-8-14 Azabudai, Minato-ku, Tokyo 106-0041	Minato		
Kenya	3-24-3 Yakumo, Meguro-ku, Tokyo 152-0023	Meguro		
Kosovo	10F VORT Toranomon South Bldg. 3-13-7 Nishishinbashi, Minato-ku, Tokyo 105-0003	Minato		
Kuwait	4-13-12 Mita, Minato-ku, Tokyo 108-0073	Minato		
Kyrgyzstan	1-5-7 Mita, Minato-ku, Tokyo 108-0073	Minato		
Laos	3-3-22 Nishiazabu, Minato-ku, Tokyo 106-0031	Minato		
Latvia	37-11 Kamiyama-cho, Shibuya-ku, Tokyo 150-0047	Shibuya		
Lebanon	Pastel City Higashiyama #101, 2-6-9, Higashiyama, Meguro-ku, Tokyo 153-0043	Meguro		
Lesotho	7-5-47 Akasaka, Minato-ku, Tokyo 107-0052	Akasaka		
Liberia	1-2-61 Ichigaya Sadoharacho, Shinjuku-ku, Tokyo	Shinjuku		
Libya	10-14 Daikanyamacho, Shibuya-ku, Tokyo 150-0034	Shibuya		
Lithuania	3-7-18 Motoazabu, Minato-ku, Tokyo 106-0046	Minato		
Luxembourg	1F Luxembourg House, 8-9 Yonbancho Chiyoda-ku, Tokyo 102-0081	Chiyoda		
Madagascar	2-3-23, Moto-Azabu, Minato-ku, Tokyo 106-0046	Minato		
Malawi	7F Takanawa Kaisei Building, 3-4-1 Minato-ku, Tokyo 108-0074	Minato		
Malaysia	20-16, Nanpeidai-cho, Shibuya-ku, Tokyo 150-0036	Shibuya		
Maldives	3-7, Hayabusa-cho, Chiyoda-ku, Tokyo 102-0092	Chiyoda		
Mali	3-12-9 Kami-Osaki, Shinagawa-ku, Tokyo 141-0021	Shinagawa		
Malta	14F Kamiyacho MT Building Rooms 38, 41-43, 4-3-20 Toranomon, Minato-ku, Tokyo 105-0001	Minato		
Marshall Islands	8-2-22, Todoroki, Setagaya-ku, Tokyo 158-0082	Setagaya		
Mauritania	5-17-5 Kitashinagawa, Shinagawa-ku, Tokyo 141-0001	Shinagawa		
Mauritius	7th floor, Tsukiji Centre Building, 6-25-10, Tsukiji, Chūō, Tokyo.	Chūō		
Mexico	2-15-1 Nagatacho, Chiyoda-ku, Tokyo 100-0014	Chiyoda		
(Federated States of Micronesia) Micronesia	4-10-6 Meguro, Meguro-ku Tokyo 107-0052	Meguro		
Moldova	Kagurazaka Natsu Bldg., 72 Enokicho, Shinjuku-ku, Tokyo 162-0806	Shinjuku		
Mongolia	21-4 Kamiyama-cho, Shibuya-ku, Tokyo 150-0047	Shibuya		
Morocco	5-4-30 Minami-Aoyama, Minato-ku, Tokyo 107-0062	Aoyama		
Mozambique	1-33-14 Sakura-Shinmachi, Setagaya-ku, Tokyo 154-0015	Setagaya		
Myanmar	4-8-26 Kitashinagawa, Shinagawa-ku, Tokyo 154-0015	Shinagawa		
Namibia	3-5-7 Azabudai, Minato-ku, Tokyo 106-0041	Minato		
Nepal	Fukukawa House B, 6-20-28, Shimomeguro, Meguro-ku, Tokyo 153-0064	Meguro		
Netherlands	3-6-3 Shibakoen, Minato-ku, Tokyo 105-0011	Minato		
New Zealand	20-40 Kamiyamacho, Shibuya-ku, Tokyo 150-0047	Shibuya		
Nicaragua	Tojuso-Yamabukicho Bldg. #501, 337, Yamabuki-cho, Shinjuku-ku, Tokyo 162-0801	Shinjuku		
Nigeria	3-6-1 Toranomon, Minato-ku, Tokyo 105-0001	Minato		
North Macedonia	5-16-17 Higashi-Gotanda, Shinagawa-ku, Tokyo 141-0022	Shinagawa		
Norway	9F, 32 Shiba Koen Building, 3-4-30 Shibakoen, Minato-ku, Tokyo 105-0011	Minato		
Oman	4-2-17 Hiroo, Shibuya-ku, Tokyo 150-0012	Shibuya		
Pakistan	4-6-17 Minami-Azabu, Minato-ku, Tokyo 106-0047	Minato		
Palau	2-21-11 Higashi-Azabu, Minato-ku, Tokyo 106-0044	Minato		
Panama	Roppongi Aschara Hills Building 2F, Roppongi 3-15-5, Minato-ku, Tokyo 106-0032	Minato		
Papua New Guinea	5-32-20 Shimomeguro, Meguro-ku, Tokyo 106-0044	Meguro		
Paraguay	Ichibancho TG Bldg., Nr.2, 7F, 2-2 Ichibancho, Chiyoda-ku, Tokyo 102-0082	Chiyoda		
Peru	2-3-1, Hiroo, Shibuya-ku, Tokyo 150-0012	Shinagawa		
Philippines	5-15-5 Roppongi, Minato-ku, Tokyo 106-8537	Roppongi		
Poland	2-13-5 Mita, Meguro-ku, Tokyo 153-0062	Meguro		
Portugal	3-6-6 Nishi-Azabu, Minato-ku, Tokyo 106-0031	Minato		
Qatar	2-3-28 Motoazabu, Minato-ku, Tokyo 106-0046	Minato		
Romania	3-16-19 Nishiazabu, Minato-ku, Tokyo 106-0031	Minato		
Russia	2-1-1 Azabudai, Minato-ku, Tokyo 106-0041	Minato		
Rwanda	1-17-17 Fukasawa, Setagaya-ku, Tokyo 158-0081	Setagaya		
Samoa	Azabu Amerex Bldg. 5th Floor, 3-5-7, Azabudai, Minato-ku, Tokyo 106-0041	Minato		
San Marino	3-5-1 Motoazabu, Minato-ku, Tokyo 106-0046	Minato		
Saudi Arabia	1-8-4 Roppongi, Minato-ku, Tokyo 106-0032	Roppongi		
Senegal	1-3-4 Aobadai, Meguro-ku, Tokyo 153-0042	Meguro		
Serbia	4-16-12 Takanawa, Minato-ku, Tokyo 108-0074	Minato		
Singapore	5-12-3 Roppongi, Minato-ku, Tokyo 106-0032	Roppongi		
Slovakia	2-11-33 Motoazabu, Minato-ku, Tokyo 106-0046	Minato		
Slovenia	7-14-12 Minamiaoyama, Minato-ku, Tokyo 107-0062	Minato		
South Africa	Hanzomon First Building, 4F, 1-4, Kojimachi, Chiyoda-ku, Tokyo 102-0083	Chiyoda		
South Korea	1-2-5 Minamiazabu, Minato-ku, Tokyo 106-0047	Minato		
South Sudan	Akasaka OS Building 4F, 2-21-15 Akasaka, Minato-ku, Tokyo 107-0052	Minato		
Spain	1-3-29 Roppongi, Minato-ku, Tokyo 106-0032	Minato		
Sri Lanka	2-1-54 Takanawa, Minato-ku, Tokyo 108-0074	Minato		
Sudan	4-7-1 Yakumo, Meguro-ku, Tokyo 152-0023	Meguro		
Sweden	1-10-3-100 Roppongi, Minato-ku, Tokyo 106-0032	Roppongi		
Switzerland	5-9-12 Minami-Azabu, Minato-ku, Tokyo 106-8589	Minato		
Syria	6-19-45 Akasaka, Minato-ku, Tokyo 107-0052	Akasaka		
Tajikistan	Kamioosaki Compound 2F & 3F, 1-5-42, Kamioosaki, Shinagawa-ku, Tokyo 141-0021	Shinagawa		
Tanzania	4-21-9 Kamiyoga, Setagaya-ku, Tokyo 158-0098	Setagaya		
Thailand	13-14-6 Kamiosaki, Shinagawa-ku, Tokyo 141-0021	Shinagawa		
Timor-Leste	1-8-9 Fujimi, Chiyoda-ku, Tokyo 102-0071	Chiyoda		
Togo	2-2-4, Yakumo, Meguro-ku, Tokyo, 152-0023	Meguro		
Tonga	1-9-10 Azabudai, Minato-ku, Tokyo 106-0041	Minato		
Tunisia	3-6-6 Kudanminami, Chiyoda-ku, Tokyo 102-0074	Chiyoda		
Turkey	2-33-6 Jingumae, Shibuya-ku, Tokyo 150-0001	Shibuya		
Turkmenistan	2-6-14 Higashi, Shibuya-ku, Tokyo 150-0011	Shibuya		
Uganda	Nogizaka Forest 3F, 9-6-44 Akasaka, Minato-ku, Tokyo 107-0052	Minato		
Ukraine	3-5-31 Nishiazabu, Minato-ku, Tokyo 106-0031	Minato		
United Arab Emirates	Arco Tower Level 7, 1-8-1 Shimomeguro, Meguro-ku, Tokyo 153-0064	Meguro		
United Kingdom	1 Ichibancho, Chiyoda-ku, Tokyo 102-8381	Chiyoda		
United States	1-10-5 Akasaka, Minato-ku, Tokyo 107-8420	Minato		
Uruguay	Daimon KS Building 7F, 1-2-1, Shibadaimon, Minato-ku, Tokyo 105-0012	Minato		
Uzbekistan	2-1-52 Takanawa, Minato-ku, Tokyo 108-0074	Minato		
Venezuela	Seiko Bldg. 3F, 2-7-4 Irifune, Chuo-ku, Tokyo	Chuo		
Vietnam	50-11 Moto-Yoyogichō, Shibuya-ku, Tokyo 151-0062	Shibuya		
Yemen	4th floor, Sanbancho KB-6 Building, 6-3, Sanbancho, Chiyoda-ku, Tokyo 102-0075	Chiyoda		The Embassy represents the UN-recognised Cabinet of Yemen government.
Zambia	1-10-2 Ebara, Shinagawa-ku, Tokyo 142-0063	Shinagawa		
Zimbabwe	6F Mita Plaza Building, 5-4-3, Mita, Minato-ku, Tokyo 108-0073	Minato		

== Other missions in Tokyo ==
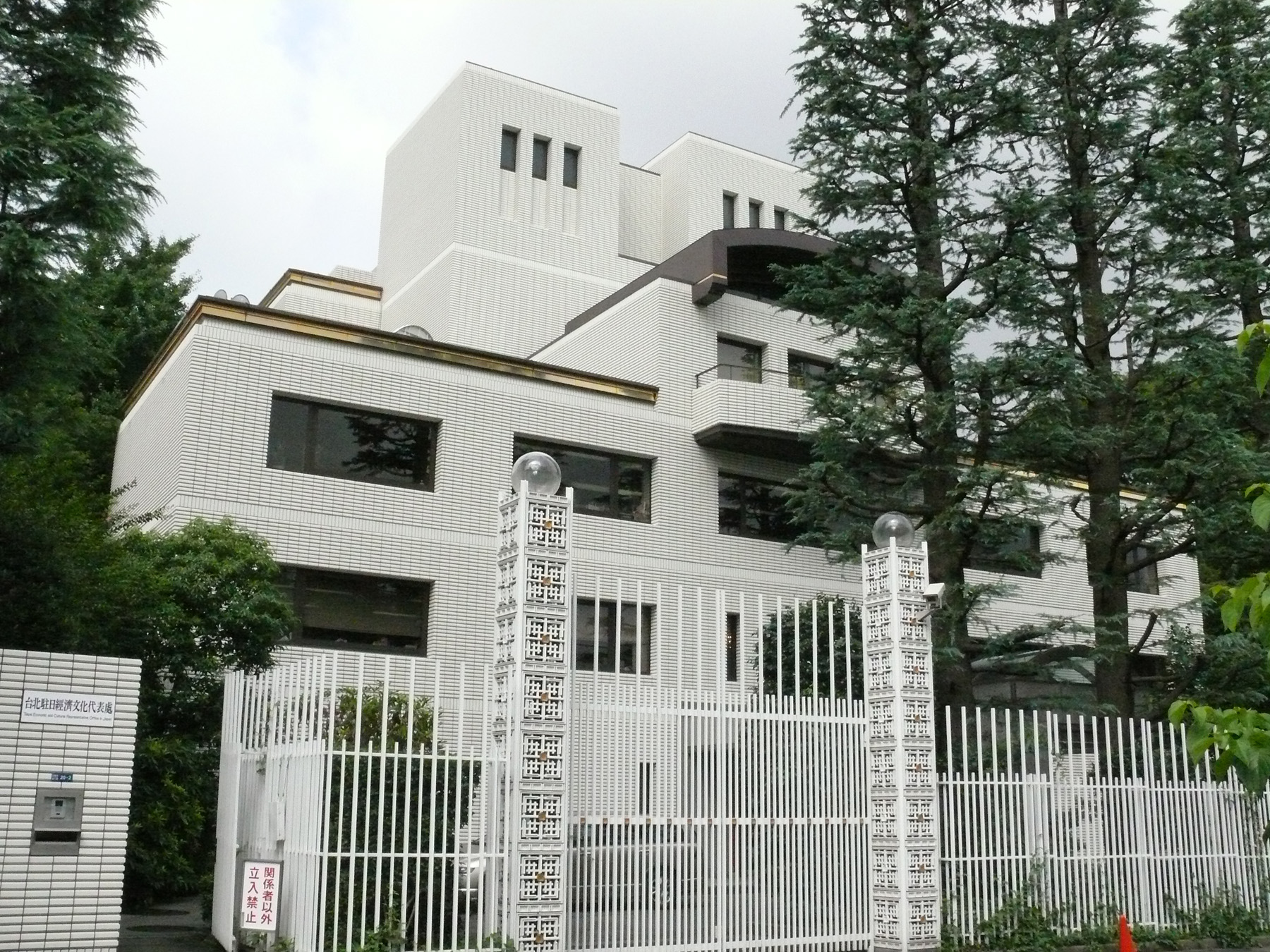
Taipei Economic and Cultural Representative Office in Tokyo

=== International Organizations ===
- European Union (Delegation)

=== Governments with limited recognition ===
- North Korea (Chongryon)
- Palestine (Permanent General Mission)
- Taiwan (Representative Office)

=== Territories ===
- Catalonia (Spain) - (Delegation)
- Hong Kong (China) - (Economic and Trade Office)
- Quebec (Canada) - (Quebec Government Office)

=== Other entities ===
- National Unity Government of Myanmar (Representative Office)
- (Tibet) Central Tibetan Administration (Representative Office)
- East Turkestan (Representative Office)

== Consulates General/Consulates ==
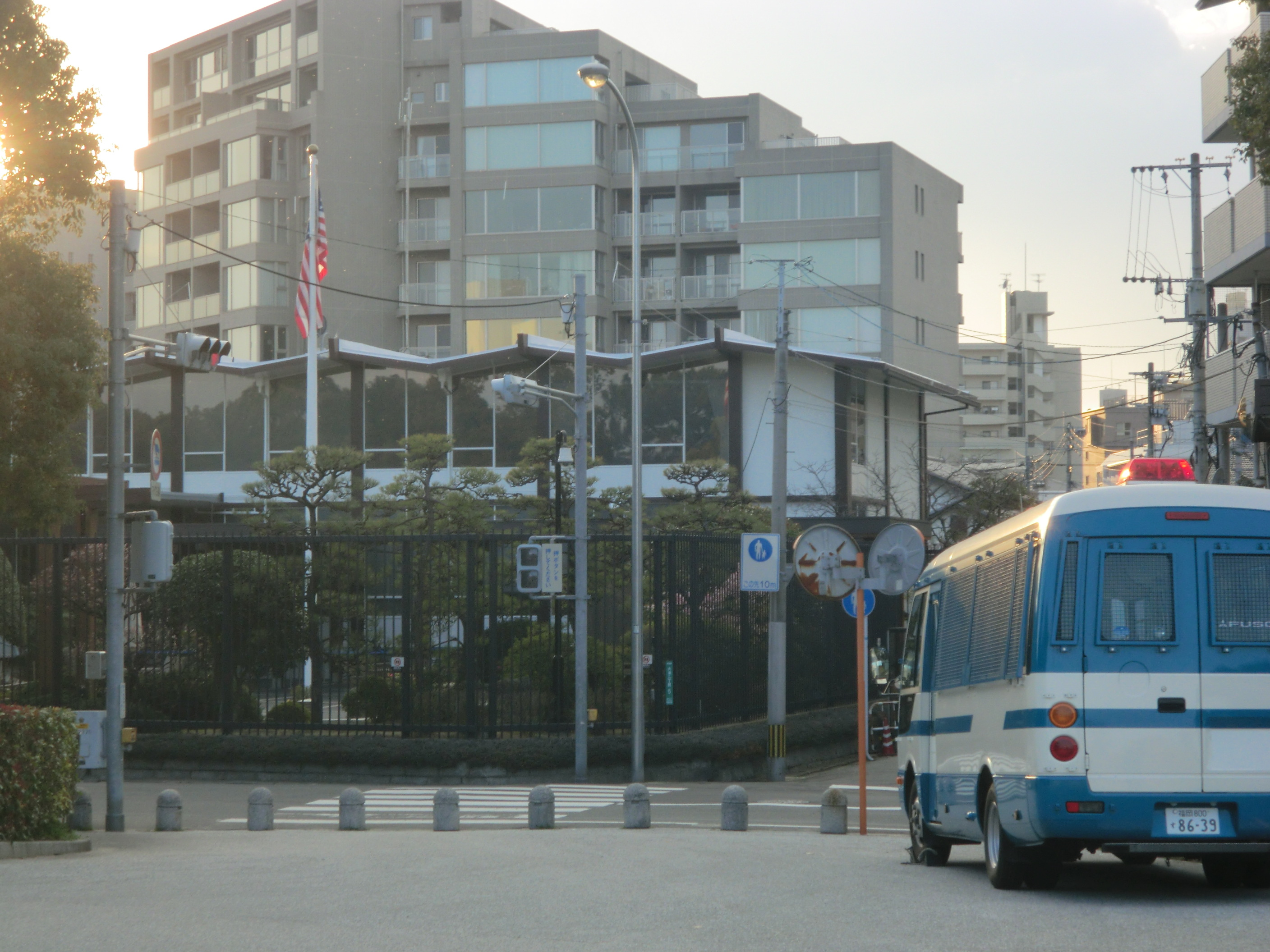
U.S. Consulate in Fukuoka.

=== Fukuoka ===
- China
- India
- South Korea
- Taiwan (Branch Office)
- Thailand
- United States (Consulate)
- Vietnam

=== Hamamatsu ===
- Brazil

=== Hiroshima ===
- South Korea

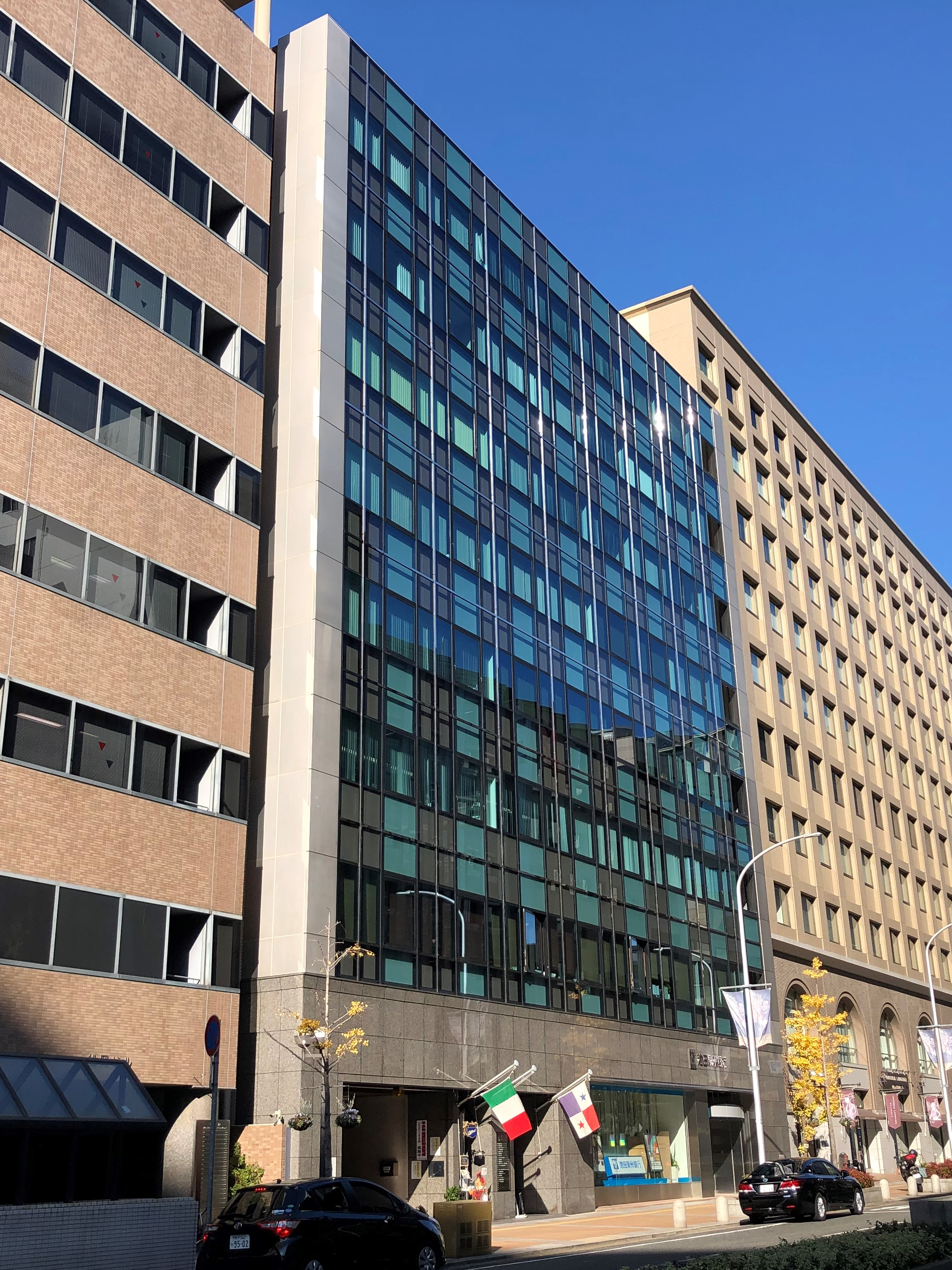
Italian and Panamanian Consulate-General in Kobe.

=== Kobe ===
- Panama
- South Korea

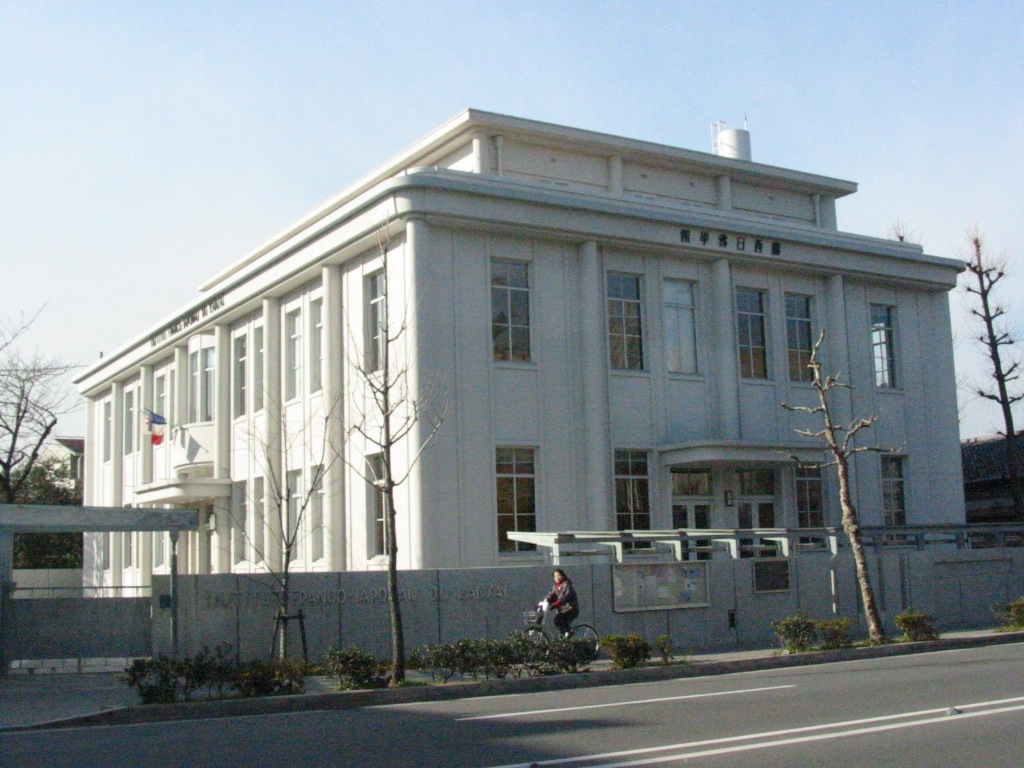
French Consulate in Kyoto.

=== Kyoto ===
- France

=== Nagasaki ===
- China

=== Nagoya ===
- Brazil
- China
- Peru
- Philippines
- South Korea
- Turkey
- United States (Consulate)

=== Naha ===
- Taiwan (Branch Office)
- United States

=== Niigata ===
- China
- Russia
- South Korea

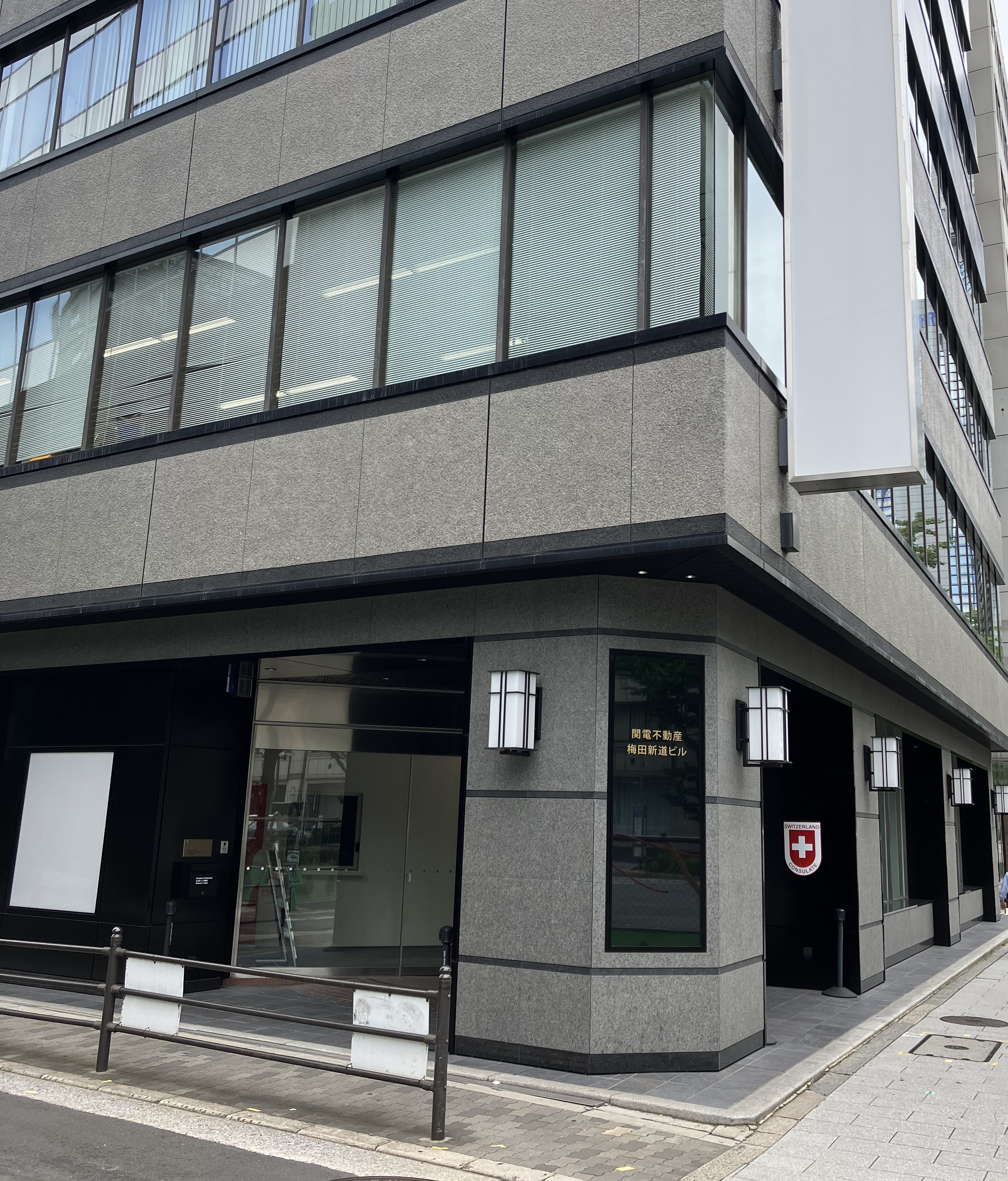
Swiss Consulate in Osaka.

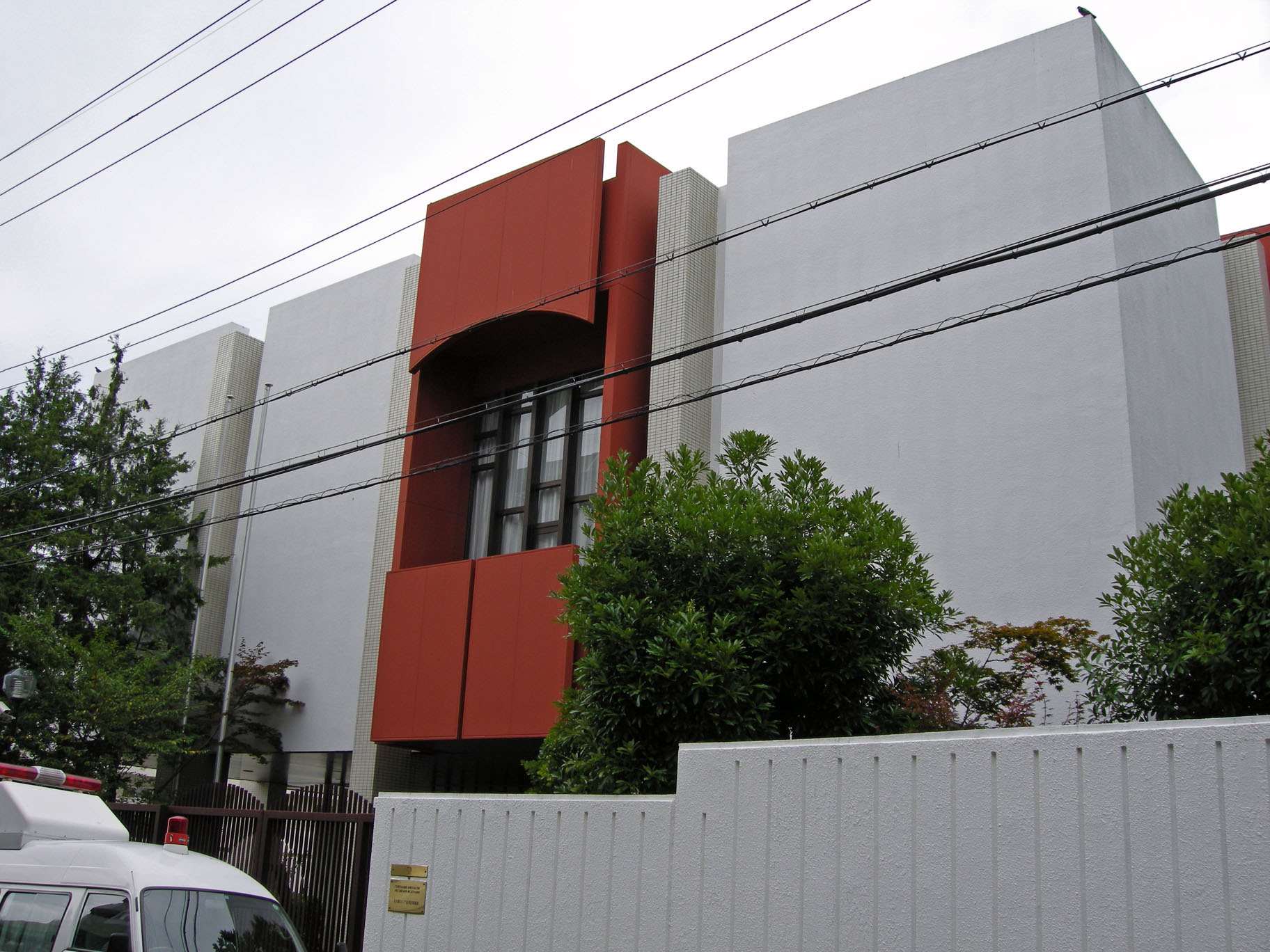
Russian Consulate-General in Osaka.

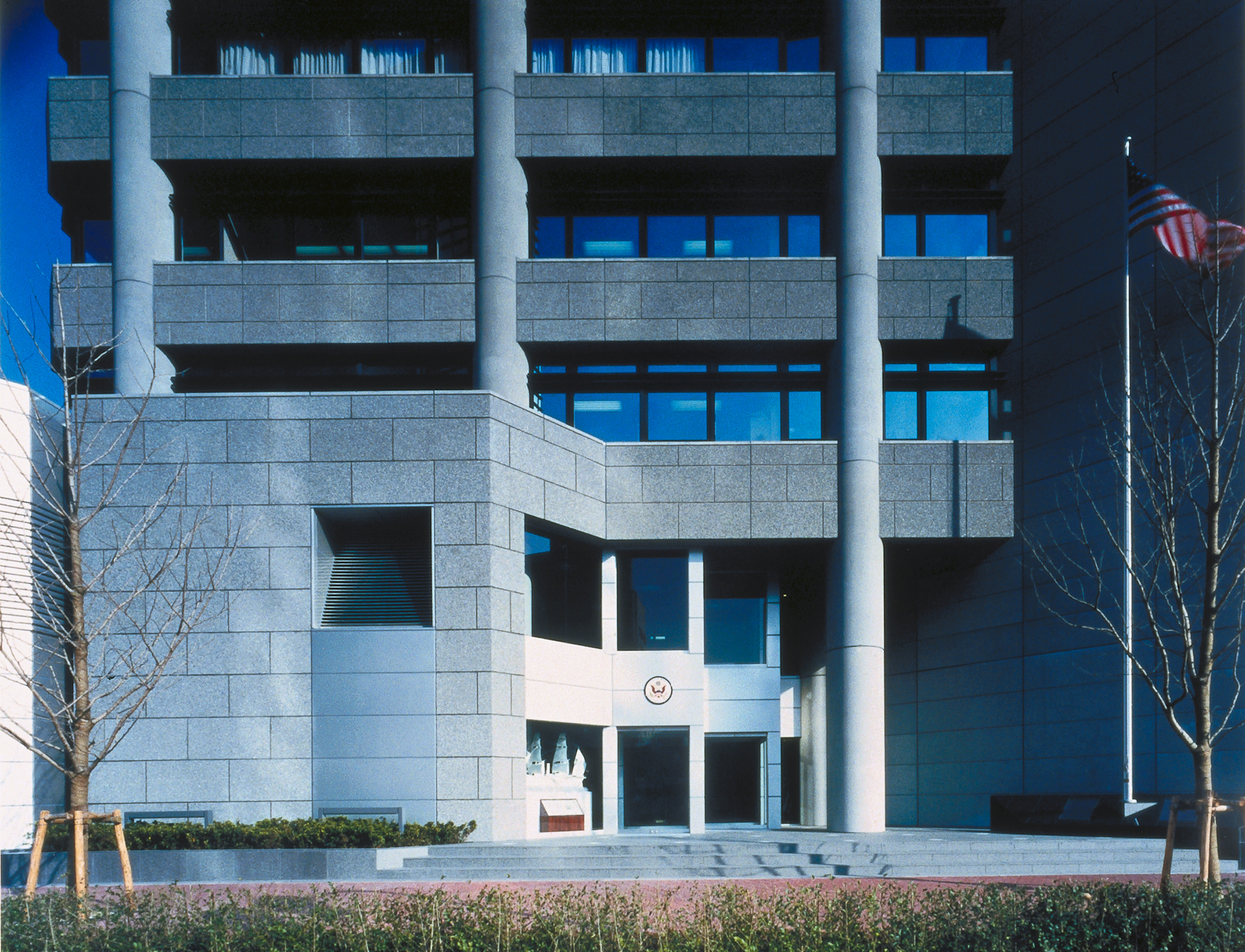
U.S. Consulate-General in Osaka.

=== Osaka ===
1. Australia
2. China
3. Germany
4. Hungary (Consulate)
5. India
6. Indonesia
7. Italy
8. Mongolia
9. Netherlands
10. Pakistan (Consulate)
11. Philippines
12. Russia
13. South Korea
14. Switzerland (Consulate)
15. Taiwan (Office)
16. Thailand
17. United Kingdom
18. United States
19. Vietnam

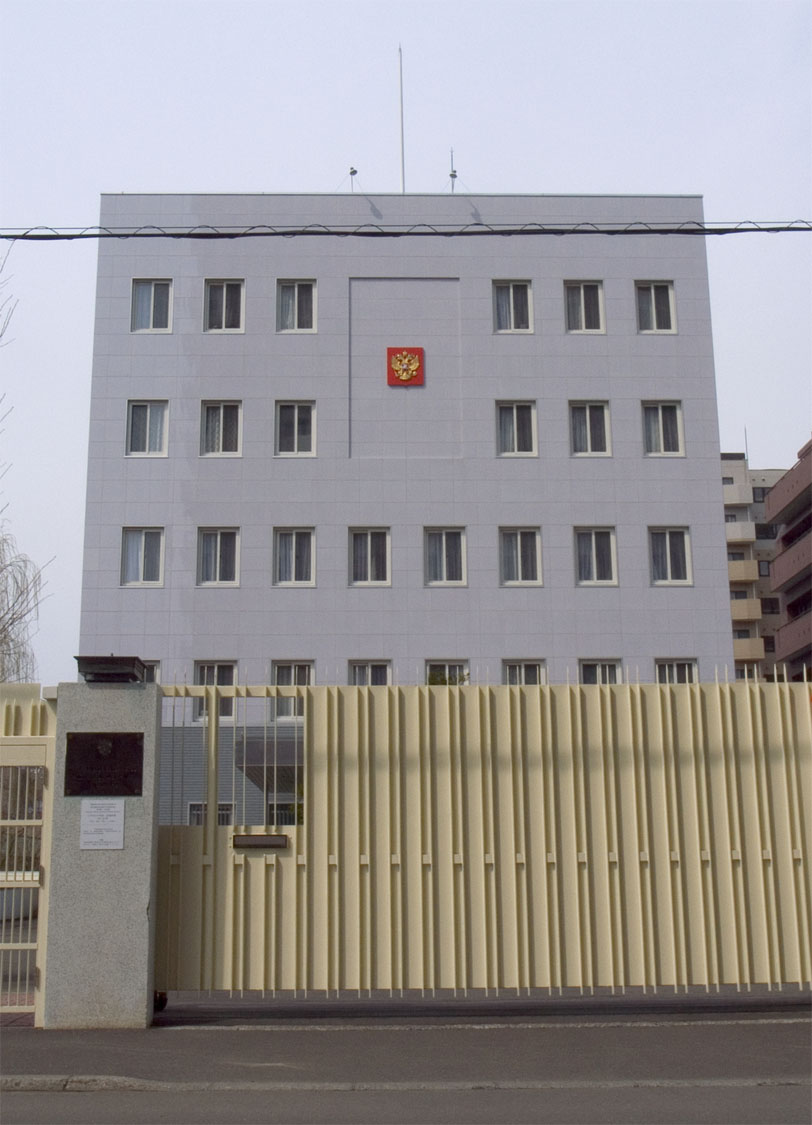
Russian Consulate-General in Sapporo.

=== Sapporo ===
- China
- Russia
- South Korea
- Taiwan (Branch Office)
- United States

=== Sendai ===
- South Korea

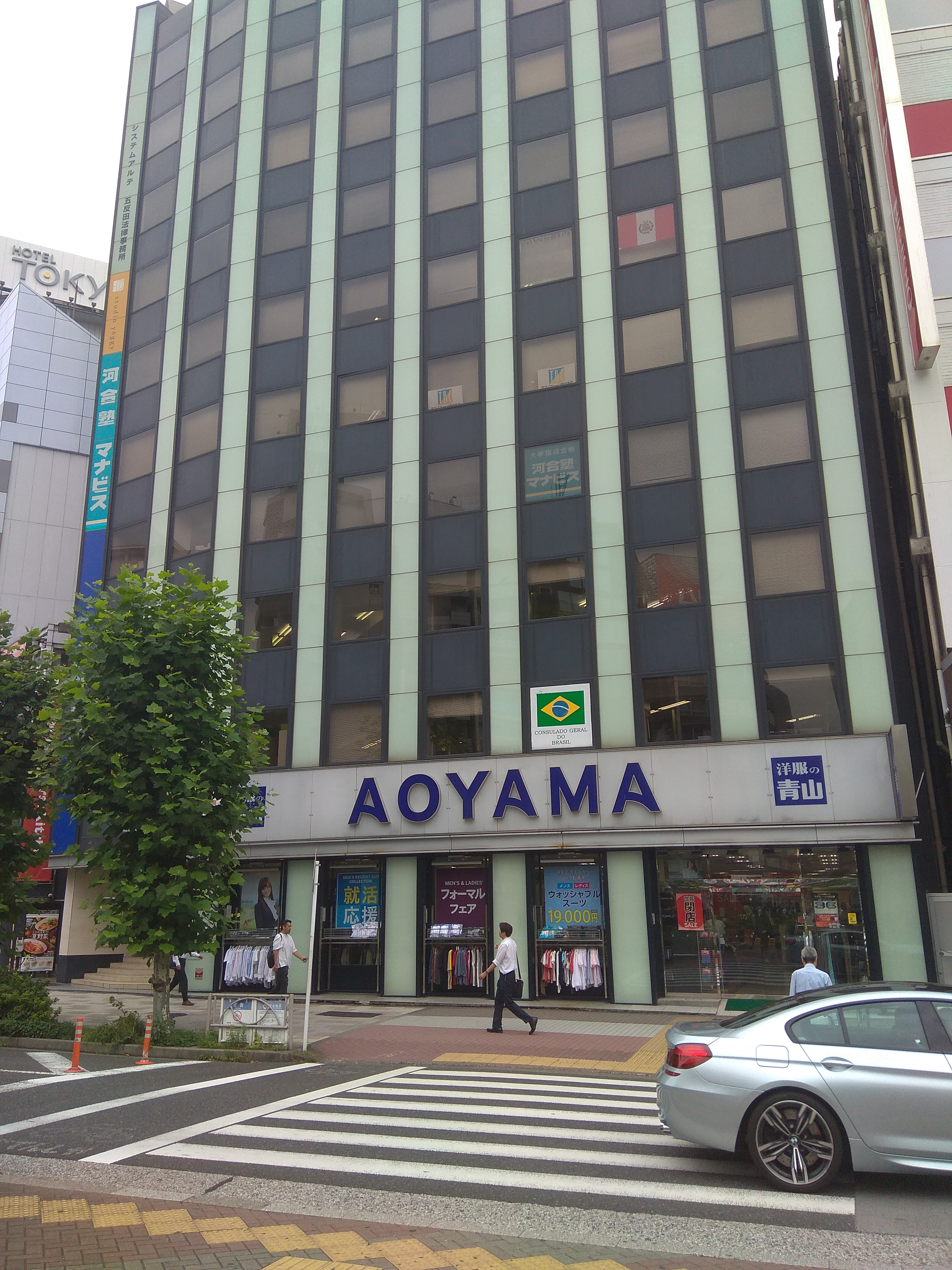
Brazilian and Peruvian Consulate-General in Tokyo.

=== Tokyo ===
- Brazil (Note: The consular section has Consulate-General status apart from the Brazilian embassy.)
- Peru (Note: The consular section has Consulate-General status apart from the Peruvian embassy.)

=== Yokohama ===
- South Korea
- Taiwan (Branch Office)

== Embassies to open ==
- Gambia
- Montenegro

== Accredited non-resident embassies ==
=== Resident in Beijing, China ===
1. Barbados
2. Burundi
3. Cape Verde
4. Chad
5. Comoros
6. Equatorial Guinea
7. Gambia
8. Guinea-Bissau
9. Guyana
10. Niger
11. Seychelles
12. Sierra Leone
13. Suriname

=== Resident in Taipei, Taiwan ===
1. Belize
2. Saint Kitts and Nevis
3. Saint Vincent and the Grenadines

=== Other Resident Locations ===
1. Antigua and Barbuda (St. John's)
2. Bahamas (Nassau)
3. Bhutan (New Delhi)
4. Dominica (Roseau)
5. Eswatini (Kuala Lumpur)
6. Kiribati (Tarawa)
7. Monaco (Monaco City)
8. Montenegro (Podgorica)
9. Solomon Islands (Honiara)
10. Trinidad and Tobago (New Delhi)

=== Unconfirmed ===
- Central African Republic
- Grenada
- São Tomé and Príncipe

== Closed missions ==
Host city	Sending country	Mission	Year closed	Ref.
Tokyo	Afghanistan	Embassy	2026	
Tokyo	Belize	Embassy	2021	
Tokyo	Burundi	Embassy	1997	
Tokyo	Central African Republic	Embassy	1992	
Tokyo	Nauru	Consulate	1989	
Tokyo	Somalia	Embassy	1990	
Tokyo	South Yemen	Embassy (Note: In 1990 the Unification of Yemen took place. The Yemeni embassy in Tokyo continues operating.)	1982	
Fukuoka	Australia	Consulate-General	2019	
Fukuoka	Canada	Consulate	2007	
Fukuoka	United Kingdom	Consulate	2006	
Hakodate	Soviet Union	Consulate	1944	
Hakodate	United Kingdom	Consulate	1934	
Kobe	Greece	Consulate-General	1981	
Kobe	Indonesia	Consulate-General	1995	
Kobe	Soviet Union	Consulate-General	1938	
Nagasaki	Republic of China	Consulate	1970	
Nagasaki	Soviet Union	Consulate	1925	
Nagoya	Denmark	Consulate-General	1993	
Nagoya	United Kingdom	Consulate	2007	
Naha	South Korea	Consulate	1995	
Niigata	German Empire	Consulate	1882	
Osaka	Canada	Consulate	2007	
Osaka	France	Consulate-General	2009	
Osaka	Mexico	Consulate-General	2001	
Osaka	New Zealand	Consulate-General	1999	
Osaka	Singapore	Consulate-General	2011	
Osaka	Sweden	Consulate-General	2008	
Otaru	Soviet Union	Vice-Consulate	1938	
Sapporo	Australia	Consulate	2019	
Shimoda	United States	Consulate-General	1859	
Shimonoseki	South Korea	Consulate-General	1996	
Shimonoseki	United Kingdom	Consulate	1940	
Yokohama	Mexico	Consulate	1941	
Yokohama	United Kingdom	Consulate	1972	
Yokohama	United States	Consulate	1973	

== See also ==
- Foreign relations of Japan
- List of diplomatic missions of Japan
- Visa requirements for Japanese citizens
