= Japan–Arab League relations =

- Arab League: Japan

Arab League

Japan

Japan–Arab League relations are the bilateral relations between Japan and the Arab League.

== History ==
The Arab-Japanese political relations date back to at least the early 20th century, manifested in Japan's recognition of Egypt immediately after its independence in 1922 and opened its first consulate in Port Said in 1919. This is considered the first official diplomatic contact in the Middle East for Japan.

The PLO opened their office in Tokyo in 1978. The Prime Minister of Japan Masayoshi Ōhira stated in the House of Councillors that the legitimate rights of the Palestinian people must include their right to establish an independent state, and that these rights must be recognized, especially the right to self-determination.

At the First Ministerial Conference of the Japanese-Arab Political Dialogue in November 2017, In Cairo, Japanese Foreign Minister Taro Kono confirmed that the Middle East is a top priority for Japan, because it represents an important component of his country, "being one of the factors that cause Japan to live in welfare, whether socially or economically, because it is a primary driver of the Japanese economy".

== Japan's foreign relations with Arab countries ==
- Algeria–Japan relations
- Bahrain–Japan relations
- Comoros–Japan relations
- Djibouti–Japan relations
- Egypt–Japan relations
- Iraq–Japan relations
- Japan–Jordan relations
- Japan–Kuwait relations
- Japan–Lebanon relations
- Japan–Libya relations
- Japan–Mauritania relations
- Japan–Morocco relations
- Japan–Oman relations
- Japan–Palestine relations
- Japan–Qatar relations
- Japan–Saudi Arabia relations
- Japan–Somalia relations
- Japan–Sudan relations
- Japan–Syria relations
- Japan–Tunisia relations
- Japan–United Arab Emirates relations
- Japan–Yemen relations
