= Vladivostok Fortress =

Military outpost, Russia, now a museum

Coordinates: 43.1224°N 131.8766°E

- Владивостокская крепость
- Vladivostok, Russia
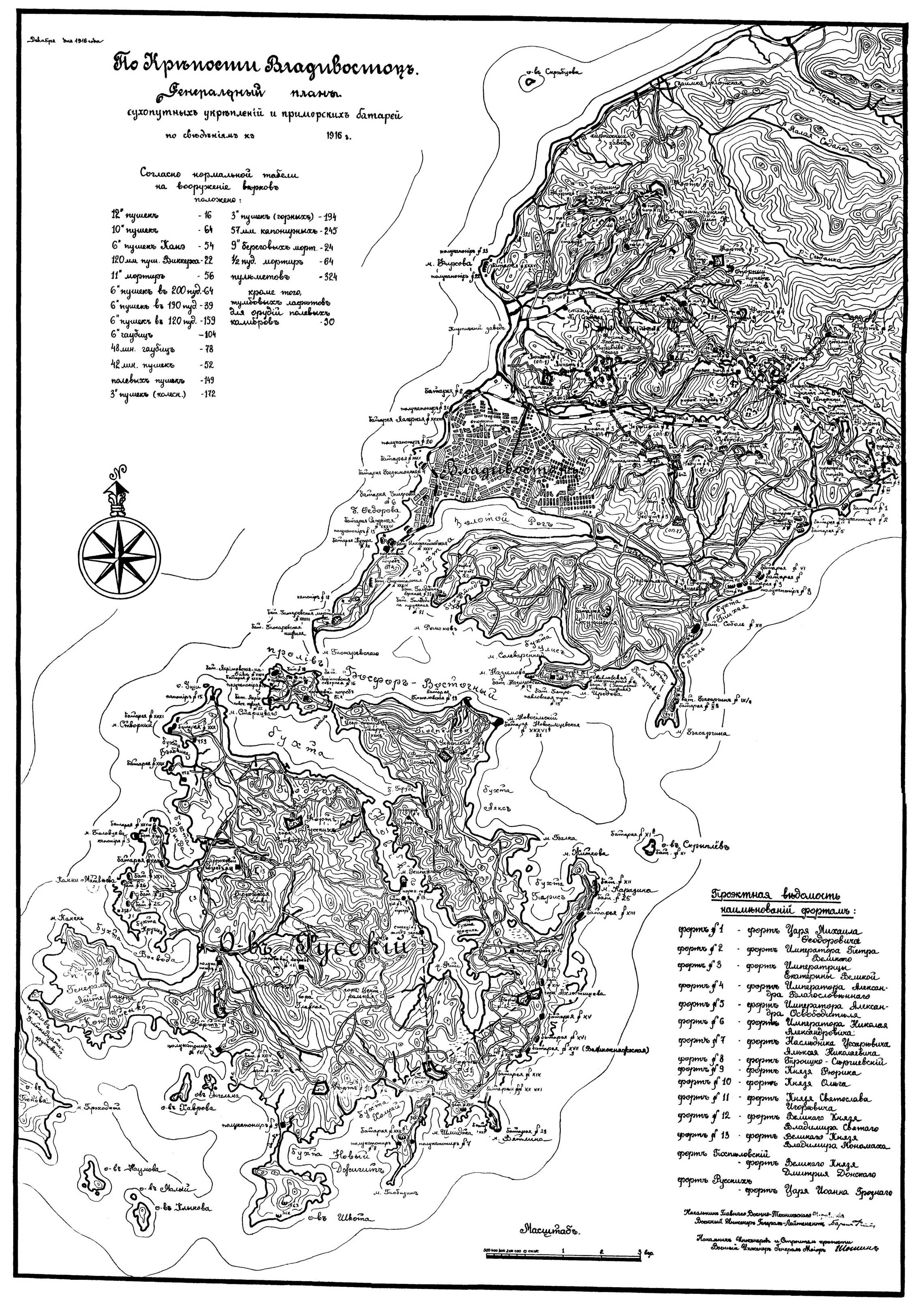
- Vladivostok Fortress Old Map

Site information
- Type: Fortress
- Controlled by: Russia

Vladivostok Fortress is a system of fortifications built from 1889 to 1918 in Vladivostok, Russia, and the surrounding area.

During construction, lessons from the Russo-Japanese War were taken into account, so that this is the most fortified of all the fortresses built at this time. Construction of the fortress was halted with the structure about 2/3 complete, due to the disruptive influence of the First World War and the October Revolution.

== Features ==
The fortress—created exclusively by Russian military engineers and builders, soldiers, combat engineers—was one of the most powerful maritime fortresses in the world. By the time of the First World War it was one of the few strongholds in the Russian far east. At the time, the fortress had about fifty shore batteries able to withstand the most powerful enemy ships, sixteen forts, and dozens of coastal caponiers, a number of strong points and land batteries. All the basic facilities were supplied with electricity and connected by roads and underground communication cables. It facilitated rapid deployment of minefields, together with the fleet. On several major forts, for protection against artillery fire, casemated barracks were erected, with more than three kilometers of galleries and six kilometers of tunnels.

=== Armament ===
On the land front – 1290 guns and 268 machine guns; including 572 ranged weapons, 718 melee weapons, 268 guns, 64 mortars, and 36 rocket machines.

On the coastal front – 316 guns and 56 machine guns; including 212 Ranged weapons, 104 melee weapons, 56 guns, 36 rocket machines.

The facilities, unlike those at Port Arthur, featured many casemated underground structures, the thickness of the concrete provided protection against fire from 280-millimeter (11 in) guns.

=== Garrison ===
The garrison of the fortress was to consist of 48 infantry battalions, 15 fortress-artillery battalions, eight batteries of field and mountain artillery manned by two battalions, a battalion of miners, a telegraph battalion, a supply battalion, two aeronautics companies, and three Cossack squadrons.

The units stationed at the fortress consisted of:

- 1st Vladivostok fortress artillery brigade
- 1st Vladivostok fortress artillery regiment,
- 2nd Vladivostok fortress artillery brigade
- 2nd Vladivostok fortress artillery regiment,
- 3rd Vladivostok fortress artillery regiment,
- 4th Vladivostok fortress artillery regiment,
- Vladivostok fortress sapper brigade.

Fortress governors:

- March 7, 1906 – June 1, 1908 – Major General Vladimir Alexandrovich Irma;
- August 3, 1913 – 1915 – Lieutenant-General Sergey Savich, Chief of Staff of the fortress;
- December 12, 1887 – May 16, 1889 – Colonel Nadarov, Ivan Pavlovich, Commanders of the 1st artbrigady;
- June 25, 1907–? – Colonel Mikhail Makeev;
- October 26, 1908 – December 20, 1911 – Colonel Konstantin Alexis;
- February 4, 1912–after April 15, 1914 – Major General Joseph Antonovich Dumbadze;

== Design and construction ==
By type and scope of fortification, construction can be divided into three stages:

1. Creating the fortress (1889–1899)
2. Construction of the second line of defense of the fortress (1899–1905)
3. Design and construction of the main line of defense of the fortress (1906–1918)

The design of the fortress after 1905 took into account the shortcomings that caused the fall of Port Arthur in 1904, as well as the achievements of fortification science of the time. The construction was in a difficult-to-access mountainous area, with extensive use of rope. The use of cutting-edge construction technology, such as compressors, concrete mixers, power and other mechanization resulted in a high rate of construction.

=== 1905–1910 ===
On September 5, 1905 the peace treaty that ended the Russo-Japanese war was signed at Portsmouth. According to the agreement, Russia ceded Japan lease rights to the Liaodong (Liaotung) Peninsula, including Port Arthur. Russia lost the southern branch of the Chinese Eastern Railway Station at Kuanchentszy, the southern part of Sakhalin Island, and allowed the Japanese fishing rights in Russian territorial waters on unfavorable terms. Russia retained the right to keep only two cruisers and its remaining destroyers in the Pacific.

Vladivostok, the end point of the Trans-Siberian Railway, was the only Russian naval base on the Pacific Ocean, and the only well-equipped commercial port in the Far East. Thus the value of Vladivostok Fortress increased sharply, it now without help had to defend all possible actions of the enemy in the northern part of Peter the Great Gulf and to avoid the possibility of the enemy's capturing the port of Vladivostok to use as a base of operations and supply point.

However, the state of defensive structures of the fortress was unsatisfactory. In addition, the end of the Russian-Japanese war coincided with the famous revolutionary actions in Vladivostok in October 1905 and January 1906. By the beginning of 1906, the fortress had about thirty shore batteries. Many of them, covering the most important sections of the coast, were temporary, their guns were mounted on wooden bases, and they used outdated aiming systems.

This temporary nature of some of the shore defenses raised the question of the fate of the fortress. Commissions were set up to answer questions about its possible strengthening. On April 16, 1907 the fortress was declared 1st class and its staff commanded by Nicholas II to bring it the appropriate state of readiness.

=== 1910–1913 ===
The year 1910 brought a final draft of construction plans. The project expected to build forts No. 1-7 and strongholds A, B, C, D, E, F, G, and 3 on the southern side of Ussuri–Sedanka Valley, to Amur Bay; forts No. 9-12 on the southern and eastern shores of the Russian Island; casemated tunnel cellars by the First River, an airfield by the Second River; many other ancillary facilities; and over 200 kilometers (120 mi) of roads.

Designers deliberately tried not to copy model projects and placed forts according to the mountainous terrain and kept gun emplacements dispersed over a large area, thus making it difficult for a potential enemy to sight their artillery. These bold departures from long-established theories of academic fortification, in connection with respect for the vagaries of extremely rough terrain, made for an original, and in most cases effective, example of the contemporary art of fortification. Forts were connected with each other by a ring road and with the center of the fortress by radial highways. There were duplicate roads near defensive lines, to allow for maneuvering troops even during shelling. All roads were laid on the reverse slopes of hills out of sight of an attacking enemy. Through underground telegraph and telephone lines, all the forts, batteries, cellar, barracks towns, and other important objects, were connected through the fortress switchboard.

In January 1913, the fortress and landfills were tested for durability; and on the basis of the results of these tests, it was recommended the thickness of the concrete structures be increased. Structures were given reinforced vaults. Floors and 5-meter-thick (16 ft) walls were constructed with rubble of durable stone and then covered with earth. The arches of the buildings exposed to direct enemy artillery (gallery areas located close to the surface, barracks) were given reinforced curved ceiling channels. The construction of these channel-vaulted gun-cover shelters was in advance thickness of guns allowed for flat coffers and left the channel for placing I-beam reinforcements. Between the outside wall and metal reinforcement a layer of asphalt concrete was packed, for waterproofing. Later on, some of the fortifications from this scheme refused to work and concrete was laid directly on structures, then covered with a layer of asphalt.

The concrete construction of forts starting 1910 looked different from fortifications built in 1900–1904. Firstly, the new construction was two to three times more effective than the former, design specifications being significantly higher than the old. The height of the wardrobe trunks from ground level were up to 8 meters (26 ft). Secondly, the construction of 1910 is almost entirely devoid of "architectural excesses", except for the widespread use of metal canopies that performed the functions of cornices. This reflected the global trend to simplify the appearance of fortifications, as outlined in the 1880s, in connection with the transition to a new building material – concrete. The 1900-1904 concrete casemate construction has elements of civil architecture - cornices, window frames, due to its small size, commensurate with a one-story building. For the 1910–1915 construction, arrays are concrete, the facades of which formed large, carefully decorated planes.

In May 1913, one of the orders the chief of engineers, General A.P. Shoshin, said:

1. Without exception, all construction must be well done, even other than what affects the primary functions of strength and stability.

2. The absence of a thorough job in this regard—resulting in rough and ugly construction—is characteristic of inattention and a lack of builder's pride in his work, and gives to the outside observer the impression of carelessness. Every last detail has to be done carefully, correctly, and cleanly. All lines of construction, the corners, the edges, the lines of intersection of the arches, plane surface, and so on, must be completely geometrically correct, with really steep vertical line and the horizontal truly horizontal.

Caring about the appearance of buildings was not some personal whim of Shoshin because, as he noted in a conversation with the Minister of War in 1914, "The main idea is to strengthen the fortress to indicate that, 'Russian is here to stay forever.' "

=== First World War ===
1914 was a turning point in the fortress's construction - the First World War. Deliveries of cement ceased, which previously had been carried by sea from Novorossiysk, since Turkey closed the Straits. Initially, the pace of construction is not reduced because the fortress had accumulated large stocks of cement; but from 1915, with the prolongation of the war, the situation began to deteriorate.

By the end of 1916, only about two-thirds of all 11 forts were ready, many of them built with only gorge barracks. All planned road construction, two reference points, five types of long-term coastal batteries, and four 120-mm Vickers guns, 21 coast caponiers, and 8 group tunnel powder magazines were completed.

Among the forts and strongholds, "North Division" was equipped with a 2,641 meters (8,665 ft) of concrete lines of fire, 24 barbettes for withdrawable guns, 21 trunks and caponiers for defense ditches, and barbed wire. Another trunk at Fort number 6 was two-thirds complete, as well as there being four half-caponiers. There were 25 shelters for the rollout of anti-assault weapons and machine guns, seven tunnels (including three at fort number 6 and two at fort number 2), one casemated barracks, 2,468 meters (8,097 ft) of galleries, 2,756 meters (9,042 ft) of countermine galleries, and 5,516 meters (18,097 ft) of tunnel trenches and inspection galleries. "Southern Division" (Russian Island) had 882 meters (2,894 ft) of concrete lines of fire, 18 barbettes for withdrawable guns, four coffers to flank the ditches (another double-trunk on the fort number 9 was one-half prepared). There were 12 shelters for withdrawable guns, 666 meters (2,185 ft) of galleries, 593 meters (1,946 ft)of countermine galleries and 480 meters (1,570 ft) of inspection galleries.

The fortress's capability was increased by four more forts and seven coastal batteries. However, the work during the war didn't compare to that during peaceful years. The signing of the Convention of the Union with Japan made Vladivostok Fortress only a rear guard position. The needs of the fighting front in Europe led to the withdrawal of weapons and various stocks. The material of the fortress artillery was also gradually sent to the front, with the more modern artillery systems being sent first.

== Demilitarization ==
In 1917, construction work in the fortress was completely halted. The forts, batteries and other buildings were only warehouses for equipment. At fortress headquarters, a liquidation committee wrote off assets or otherwise accounted for the cost of construction. We can assume that the Office of the Builder of Vladivostok fortifications worked to preserve the working order of what was left in place. A year later came the "agony". Remaining in the fortress and returning from the fronts, military engineers tried fulfill professional duties to counteract stripping the fortress of equipment.

Then began the so-called "coal and wood-burning catastrophe", with completely devalued money and constantly changing positions on the part of the authorities. Boat construction, the military pigeon station, and telegraph company were auctioned to cover debts. Part of the building materials was transferred to the Vladivostok military-industrial committee for the construction of a shipyard and airfields and hangars in Vladivostok, Verkhneudinsk, Harbin, Qiqihar, Ninguta, and at station Manchuria for the aviation troops of Admiral Kolchak. In late 1918, the Office of the Builder was abolished. Vladivostok fortress engineering management remained until 1923, serving as the supply of engineering troops but from time to time underwent reduction.

In 1923, in connection with the agreement between the Japanese command and the command of the People's Revolutionary Army of the Far Eastern Republic, Vladivostok fortress was demilitarized. The remaining guns were dismantled, headquarters and management disbanded, and the fortifications were permanently abandoned.

== Present day ==
On October 30, 1996, the Vladivostok Fortress Museum, dedicated to the history of the fortress, was opened where Battery Nameless stood. Fort number 7 was rented and turned into a museum. Battery "Paul Mortirnaya" is rented by the Ussuri Cossacks. On December 23, 2019, the fortress' museum received federal status when it was placed under the management of the new Vladimir K. Arseniev Museum of Far East History following the merger of the Vladivostok Fortress museum with the Vladimir K. Arseniev Primorsky Museum.
