= Baker Abdel Munem =

Palestinian diplomat (1942–2023)

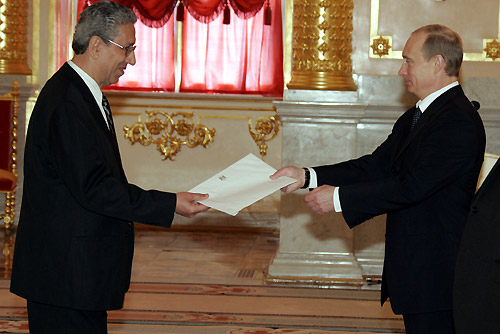

Palestinian National Authority Ambassador to Canada
- In office 23 July 1995 – 9 April 2023
- Preceded by: No one (post created)

Palestinian National Authority Ambassador to Japan
- In office 1983–1995
- Preceded by: Fathi Abdul Hamid
- Succeeded by: Waleed Ali Siam

Personal details
- Born: 1942 Ramla, Palestine
- Died: 9 April 2023 (aged 80)
- Party: Fatah-Revolutionary Council
- Spouse: Ghada Abu Laban
- Children: Madiha, Kenana, and Abdel Munem
- Education: Cairo University, Czechoslovakia, Germany, and the United States
- Occupation: Diplomat, Engineer, Politician, and Academic

Baker Abdel Munem (Arabic: بكر عبد المنعم; 1942 – 9 April 2023) was the Palestinian National Authority's official ambassador to Canada.

Baker Abdel Munem was born in 1942 in Ramla, Palestine. Only six years later, when the 1948 mass deportation of Palestinians occurred simultaneously with the implementation of the Balfour Declaration, he and his family took refuge in Amman, Jordan. He attended Cairo University in 1966, graduating with a BSc in mechanical engineering and served as head of the main electric power station in Jordan for seven years. He returned to Cairo University to continue his studies and obtained his MSc in mechanical engineering in 1975. Abdel Munem served as the vice-president of the International Union of Students from 1978 to 1983 when he obtained his PhD in mechanical engineering from Czechoslovakia. In 1979, he became a member of the Palestine National Council (PNC), and an elected member of the Fatah Revolutionary Council in 1989. In 1985, he earned a PhD in economics from Germany and a PhD in political science from the United States in 1988.

Abdel Munem's first diplomatic post was the Palestine Liberation Organization's ambassador to Japan from 1983 to 1995. On 23 July 1995, he was assigned by the PLO to head the newly established Palestine General Delegation to Canada.

Abdel Munem was married to Ghada Abu Laban, has two daughters, Madiha and Kenana and one son, Abdel Munem. He died on 9 April 2023, at the age of 80.

== Bibliography ==
Abdel Munem authored several books.

- Palestine in My Heart 1991
- The PLO and the Gulf War 1991
- An Inside Story of the Middle East Peace Conference 1993
- Old Japanese Folk Tales 1995
- Songs to Hiroshima (Poems) 1996
