= Bahrain–Japan relations =

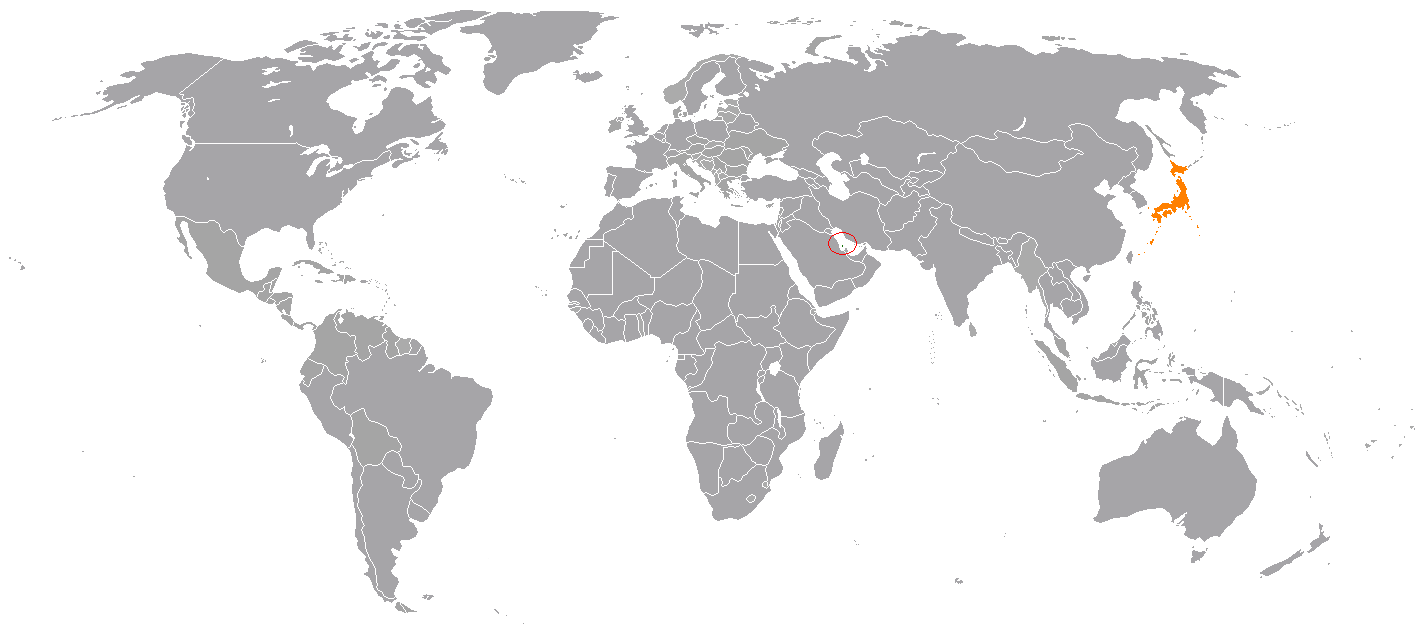

- Bahrain: Japan

Historic and current bilateral relationship exist between Bahrain and Japan. Diplomatic relations were first established in 1972, and since then they have had increasing economic, cultural, and military cooperation, with Japan becoming one of the major trading partners of Bahrain. Several high-level official visits have taken place, including by King Hamad bin Isa Al Khalifa to Japan in 2012, Crown Prince Salman in 2013, and Prime Minister Shinzo Abe to Bahrain in 2013, with the governments of both countries expressing their intent to continue to increase their bilateral relations.

Japan recognized the kingdom in August 1971, and has maintained an embassy in Manama since 1988, while Bahrain has had an embassy in Tokyo since 2005. The Bahraini ambassador to Japan is Khalil Bin Ebrahim Hassan, who has held his post since 2005, while the Japanese ambassador to Bahrain has been Kiyoshi Asako since 2014. Bahrain's crown prince attended the state funeral of the assassinated Japanese prime minister Shinzo Abe in September 2022.

== Trade ==
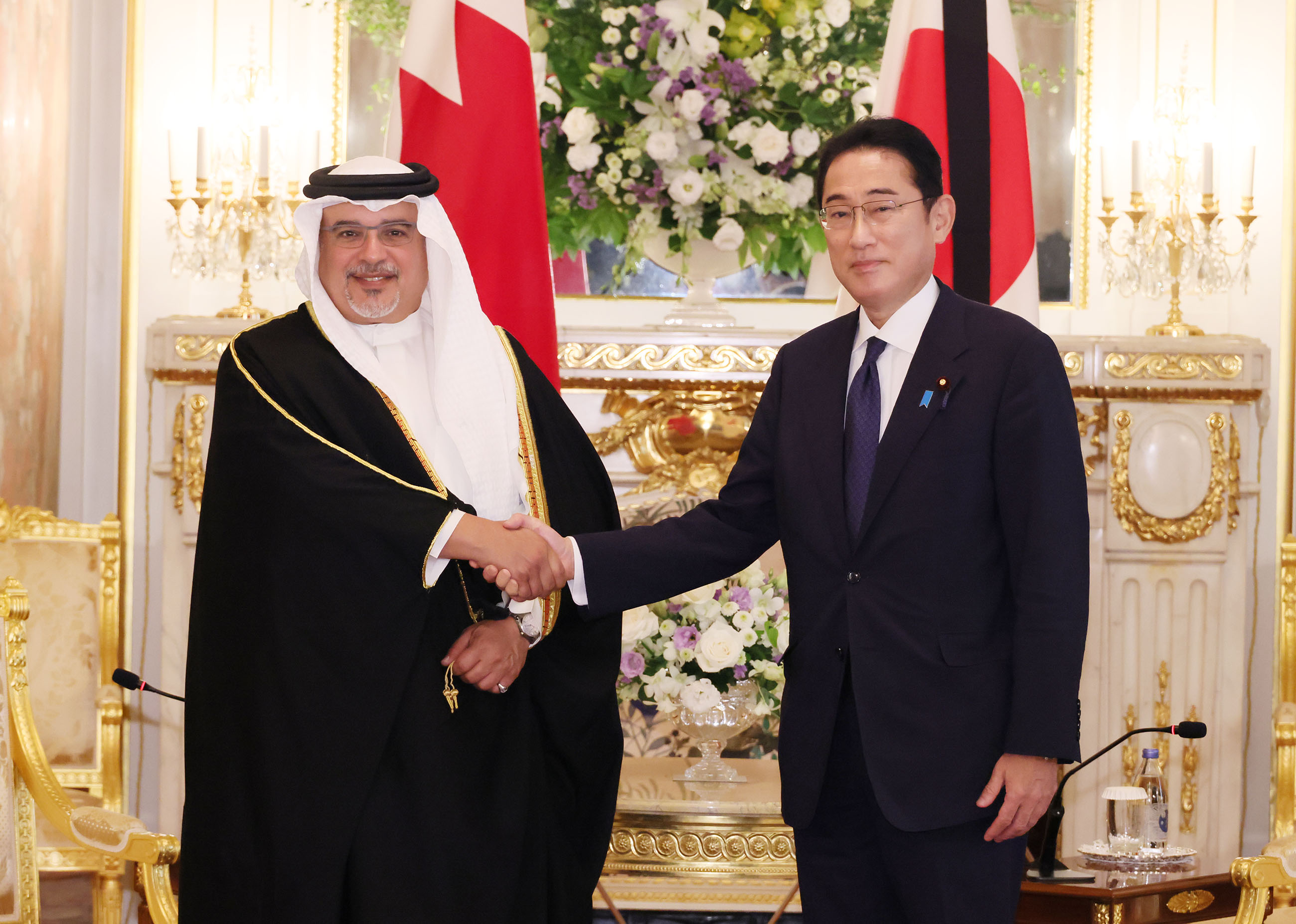
The Bahraini Crown Prince and Prime Minister Salman bin Hamad Al Khalifa meeting with the Japanese prime minister Fumio Kishida in September 2022.

The two countries have a history of successful economic cooperation, with Japan being one of the Gulf kingdom's major trading partners. Trade between them began in 1934, when the first shipment of Bahraini oil arrived in Yokohama, Japan. As of 2015, Bahraini exports to Japan are worth 39.1 billion Japanese yen while Bahraini imports from Japan are worth 107.3 billion Japanese yen. Japan has also spent about US$440,000 on grand aid in the country and US$17.37 million on technical cooperation with Bahrain. Thirteen trade agreements regarding healthcare and pharmaceuticals, education and training, oil and gas, and financial services were signed during Crown Prince Salman's official visit to Japan in March 2013.

Japan is Bahrain's fourth largest import partner.

== Military cooperation ==
Bahrain and Japan are Major non-NATO allies of the United States. Especially, Bahrain hosts the headquarters of U.S. 5th Fleet and Japan hosts the headquarters of U.S. 7th Fleet.

Many visits by top Japanese Self-Defense Forces officers and defense ministry officials have been made to Bahrain, while some Bahrain Defense Force officials have made visits to Japan.

== High-level visits ==
The following Bahraini ministers and leaders have made visits to Japan.

Date	Participant(s)
1990.11	Sheikh Ali bin Khalifa bin Salman Al Khalifa for attending for the enthronement ceremony of His Majesty, Emperor Akihito
1994. 9	Sheikh Ali bin Khalifa bin Salman Al Khalifa for attending to the conference of ITU in Kyoto
1994.11	Yousif Ahmed Al Shirawi, Minister of Development and Industry
2001.2	Sheikh Muhammad ibn Mubarak ibn Hamad Al Khalifah, Minister of Foreign Affairs
2007.11	Mr. Abdullatif bin Rashid Al Zayani, Chief of Public Security, Ministry of Interior
2008.2	Shaikh Khalid bin Ahmed Al Khalifa, Minister of Foreign Affairs
2008.3	Dr. Jasim Husain, Member of the Council of Representatives
2008.6	Mr. Khalifa Al Dhahrani, Chairman of the Council of Representatives
2008.10	Shaikh Salman bin Hamad Al Khalifa, Crown Prince and Chairman of Economic Development Board; Sheikh Hussam bin Isa Al Khalifa, Advisor, Prime Minister's Court
2011.2	Sheikh Rashid bin Abdullah Al Khalifa, Minister of Interior
2012.4	His Majesty, King Hamad bin Isa Al Khalifa
2012.10	Shaikh Ahmed bin Mohammed Al Khalifa, Minister of Finance
2013.3	Prince Salman bin Hamad Al Khalifa, Crown Prince and Deputy Supreme Commander
2013.9	Shaikh Nasser bin Hamad Al Khalifa, Chairman of Supreme Council for Youth and Sports, President Bahrain Olympic Committee and Chairman of the Board of Trustees of the Royal Charity Organization
2014.2	Salah Ali Mohamed Abdulrahman, Minister of Human Rights Affairs
2015.3	Sadiq bin Abdulkarim Al-Shehabi, Minister of Health

The following Japanese ministers and leaders have made official visits to the Kingdom of Bahrain.

Date	Participant(s)
1991. 7	Mr. Muneo Suzuki, State Secretary for Foreign Affairs
1994.11	Their Imperial Highness Crown Prince Naruhito and Princess Masako
2001. 3	Mr. Seishiro Eto, Senior Vice-Minister for Foreign Affairs
2001.8	Ms. Kaori Maruya, Parliamentary Vice-Minister for Foreign Affairs
2002.9	Mr. Kenshiro Matsunami, Parliamentary Vice-Minister for Foreign Affairs
2005.6	Mr. Katsuyuki Kawai, Parliamentary Vice-Minister for Foreign Affairs
2006.7	Mr. Taro Kimura, Senior Vice-Minister for Defense
2006.10	Mr. Takeshi Iwaya, State Secretary for Foreign Affairs
2006.12	Ms. Yuriko Koike, Special Advisor to the Prime Minister
2007.7	Mr. Kazunori Tanaka, Parliamentary Secretary for Defense; Vice Admiral Eiji Yoshikawa, Chief of Staff, Japan Maritime Self-Defense Force
2007.9	Mr. Itsunori Onodera, State Secretary for Foreign Affairs
2007.10	Mr. Minoru Terada, Parliamentary Secretary for Defense
2007.12	Ms. Yuriko Koike, Former Minister of Defense
2008.4	Mr. Tsutomu Takebe, Chairperson of Japan-Bahrain Parliamentary Friendship League
2008.7	Mr. Hiroshi Okuda, Special Envoy of the Prime Minister; Mr.Ryotaro Tanose, Member of the House of Representatives
2008.12	Mr. Yoshimasa Hayashi, Former Minister of Defense; Mr. Ryota Takeda, Parliamentary Secretary for Defense
2009.3	Mr. Yasutoshi Nishimura, Parliamentary Vice-Minister for Foreign Affairs
2009.5	Mr. Yasuo Fukuda, Special Envoy of the Prime Minister
2009.6	Vice Admiral, Toru Izumi, Commander in chief, Self Defense Fleet
2009.12	General Ryoichi Oriki, Commander in chief, Joint Staff; Hidehisa Otsuji, Former Minister of Health, Labour and Welfare; Kazuya Shinba, Senior Vice-Minister for Defense
2010.12	Hajime Hirota, Parliamentary Secretary for Defense
2012.5	Mr. Mitsu Shimojo, Parliamentary Secretary for Defense
2012.6	Vice Admiral Katsutoshi Kawano, Commander in chief, SDF
2013.5	Mr. Yasuo Fukuda, Former prime minister
2013.8	Mr. Shinzo Abe, Prime Minister
2014.1	Mr. Toru Doi, Vice-Minister of Land, Infrastructure, Transport and Tourism
2015.5	Mr. Takashi Uto, Parliamentary Vice-Minister for Foreign Affairs; Mr. Takahiro Ishikawa, Parliamentary Vice-Minister for Defense; Mr. Daishiro Yamagiwa, Senior Vice Minister of Economy, Trade and Industry
2016.6	Vice Admiral Yasuhiro Shigeoka, Commander in chief, SDF

== See also ==
- Foreign relations of Bahrain
- Foreign relations of Japan
- The Japanese School in Bahrain
