= Japan–Palestine relations =

- Japan: Palestine

Diplomatic mission
- Representative Office of Japan, Ramallah: General Mission of Palestine, Tokyo

Envoy
- Ambassador Yoichi Nakashima: Ambassador Waleed Ali Siam

Japan–Palestine relations are the relations between Japan and Palestine.

Although the two countries have friendly relations, Japan does not recognize Palestine as a sovereign state but does recognize the Palestinian National Authority.

== History ==
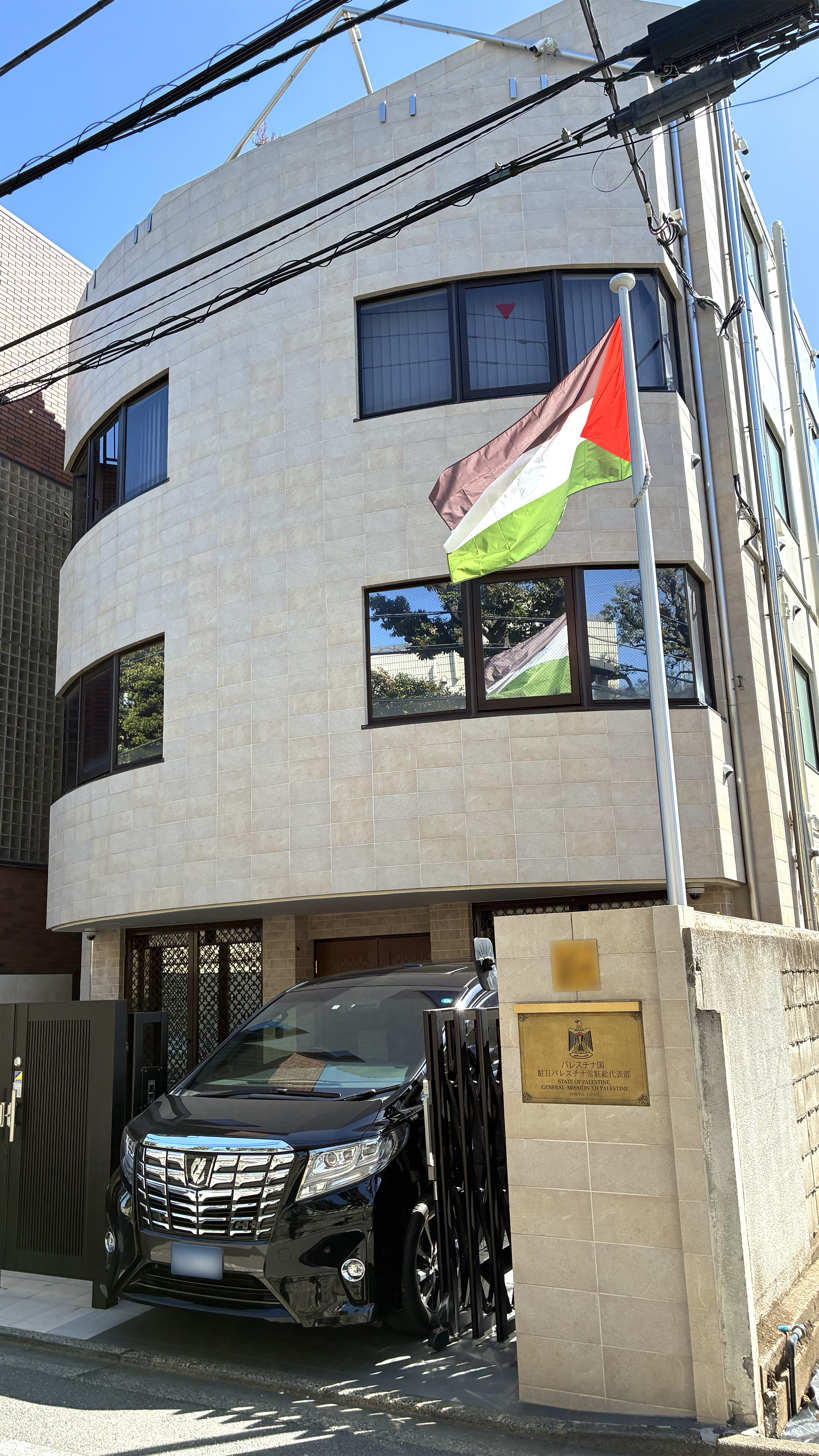
General Mission of Palestine, Tokyo

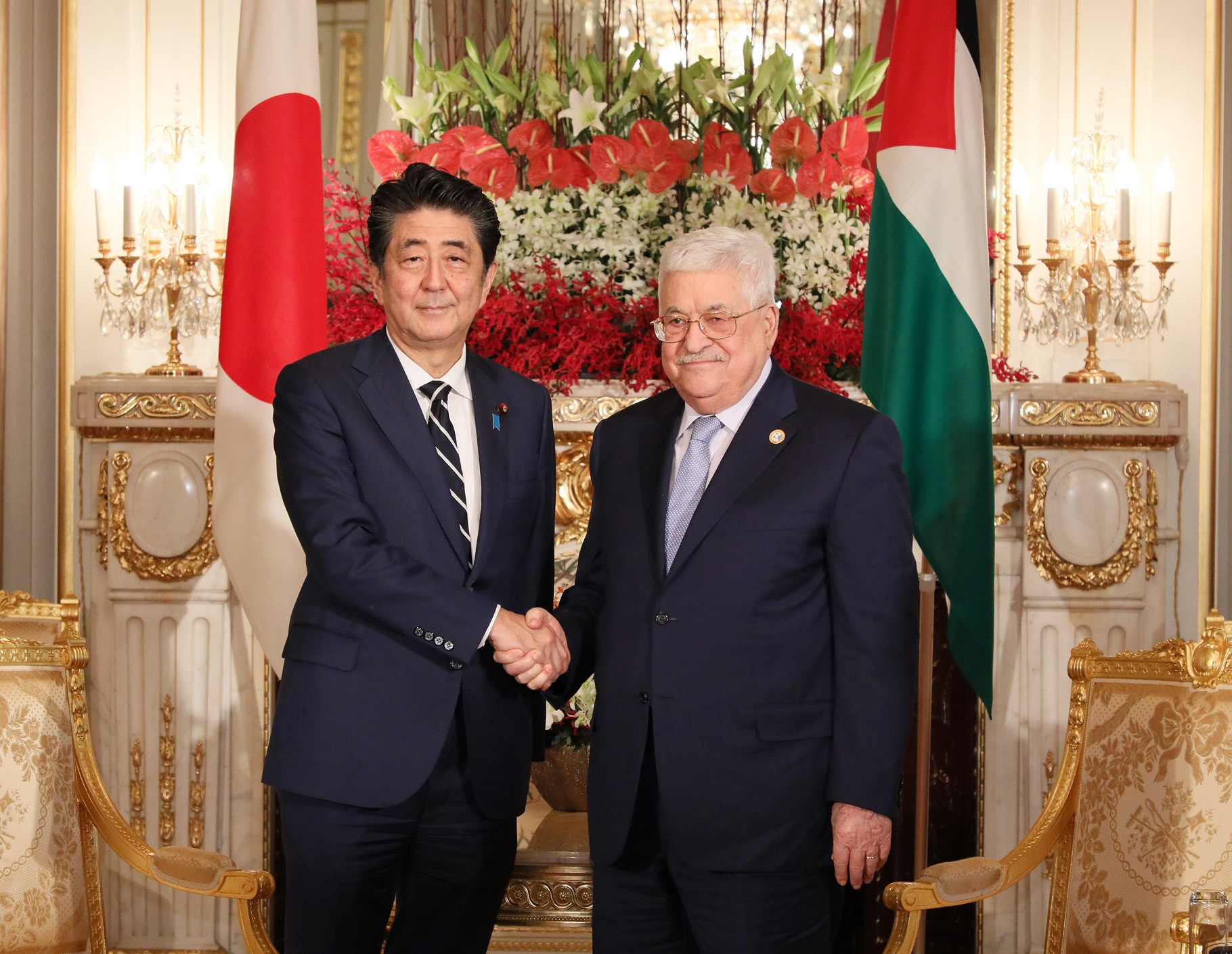
Japanese PM Shinzo Abe (left) and Palestinian President Mahmoud Abbas at the Akasaka Palace in October 2019.

Before Japan and Palestine established official relations, one serious incident was triggered. Three Japanese Red Army terrorists, in coordination with the Popular Front for the Liberation of Palestine, killed 26 people in an indiscriminate shooting at the passenger terminal of Lod Airport on May 30, 1972.

Initially, a Palestine Liberation Organization office was opened in Tokyo in 1977. Yasser Arafat, Chairman of the PLO and later President of the State of Palestine, paid an official visit to Japan in October 1981. Arafat additionally visited Japan four times between 1996 and 2000.

Japanese Prime Minister Tomiichi Murayama also paid a visit, the first of its kind, to the Palestinian Authority in 1995. In October 2001, former Prime Minister Ryutaro Hashimoto denied the existence of a direct link between the roots of international terrorism and the Palestinian people's struggle for their legitimate rights and called on Israel to implement international resolutions to advance the peace process.

President Mahmoud Abbas was among the international guests at the enthronement ceremony of Japanese Emperor Naruhito on October 22, 2019. Abbas met with Prime Minister Shinzo Abe at the Akasaka Palace in Tokyo on the eve of the enthronement.

== Japan’s support to Palestine ==
Japan is actively providing assistance to the Palestinians. During the period 1993–2002, economic aid was provided, totaling US$630 million, at an annual average of US$85 million, through UNRWA, the United Nations Development Programme and UNICEF.

During early July 2023, Israeli forces repeatedly attacked the Jenin refugee camp, wounding and killing innocent Palestinian civilians and destroying their homes. Around a month later, on August 15, the Government of Japan decided to provide an emergency grant aid of US$1 million through UNRWA to support the Jenin camp.

A statement released on August 5, 2025, by Koichi Takemasa and Katsuya Okada on the official website of the Constitutional Democratic Party of Japan stated that there was a need to recognize Palestine as an independent country in order to "urge Israel to implement an immediate ceasefire, to pressure for the full acceptance of humanitarian assistance in Palestine" [...] and to "support the establishment of an independent Palestinian state and a permanent peace" in the face of the Gaza War.

== See also ==
- Foreign relations of Japan
- Foreign relations of Palestine
- Representative Office of Japan, Ramallah
- General Mission of Palestine, Tokyo
- Japan–Arab League relations
