= Vladimir K. Arseniev Museum of Far East History =

Museum in Vladivostok, Russia

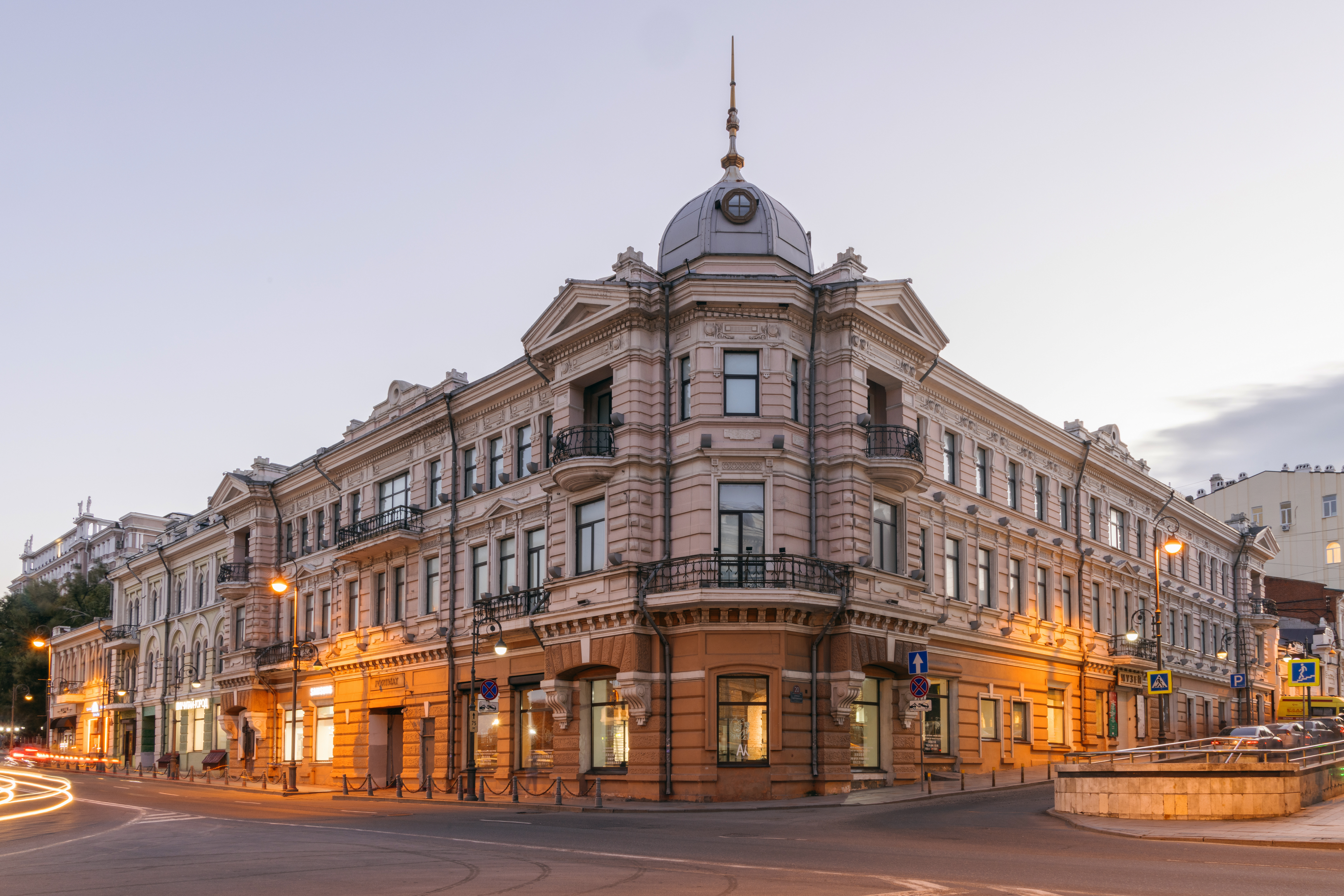
- The Vladimir K. Arseniev Museum in 2022
- Former name: Vladimir Arseniev Primorsky Krai United Museum
- Established: 1884
- Location: Vladivostok, Russia
- Coordinates: 43°6′58.6″N 131°52′55.7″E
- Visitors: 421,000 (2015)
- Website: arseniev.org

The Vladimir K. Arseniev Museum of Far East History (Russian: Музей истории Дальнего Востока имени В. К. Арсеньева) is a museum named after the explorer, Vladimir Arseniev, in the city of Vladivostok in the Russian Far East. The museum's collections focus on the history of Vladivostok and the surrounding area in Primorsky Krai. The Vladimir K. Arseniev Museum of Far East History also manages the museum facilities at Vladivostok Fortress.

== Overview ==
What would become the Vladimir K. Arseniev Museum of History of the Far East was the first local history museum in the Russian Far East. It is the largest museum in the Primorsky Krai. The museum focuses on the history and natural history of the Primorsky Krai with the collections of materials and documents from the researchers of the region including Mikhail Ivanovich Venyukov and Nikolay Przhevalsky. It also features materials on the history of the Vladivostok area including its archeology and ethnography. The museum has branches in Vladivostok and throughout Primorsky Krai.

The museum was established on 18 April 1884 when the charter of the Society for the Study of the Amur Region was approved and after which construction of the museum building was started. It opened to the public on 12 October 1890. By the decree of the Council of People's Commissars of 17 February 1925, the museum was seized by the Soviet state. On 4 September 1945, the museum was named after Vladimir Arseniev, a Russian explorer of the Far East who wrote Dersu Uzala about his expeditions with the eponymous Nanai hunter. The Primorsky Regional Museum of Local Lore was reorganized into the Vladimir Arseniev Primorsky Krai United Museum on 25 November 1985. On 23 December 2019, the Primorsky Museum received federal status and was renamed the Vladimir K. Arseniev Museum of the Far East following its merger with the museum at Vladivostok Fortress. As of 2015, the museum was the most visited regional museum in Russia with attendance exceeding 421,000 visitors.

=== Building history ===
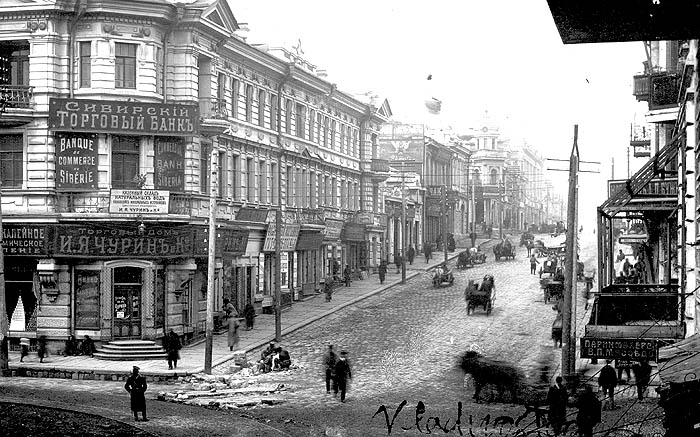
Museum building in the 1910s.

The Vladimir K. Arseniev Museum of History of the Far East is located in the building of a tenement house originally owned by Babintsev, one of the partners of the largest commercial and industrial companies in the Far East: "Trading House Churin and Kasyanov". The trading house was built between 1903 and 1906 by architect Vladimir Antonovich Plansen. The building temporarily housed the Consulate-General of Japan, Vladivostok from 1914 to 1916. After the Russian Revolution, the building was home to the Yokohama Specie Bank, a hairdresser, a barbecue, a financial department, and the Pacific Institute of Fisheries and Oceanography. In 1977, the Primorsky Regional Museum moved into the building.

== Exhibits ==
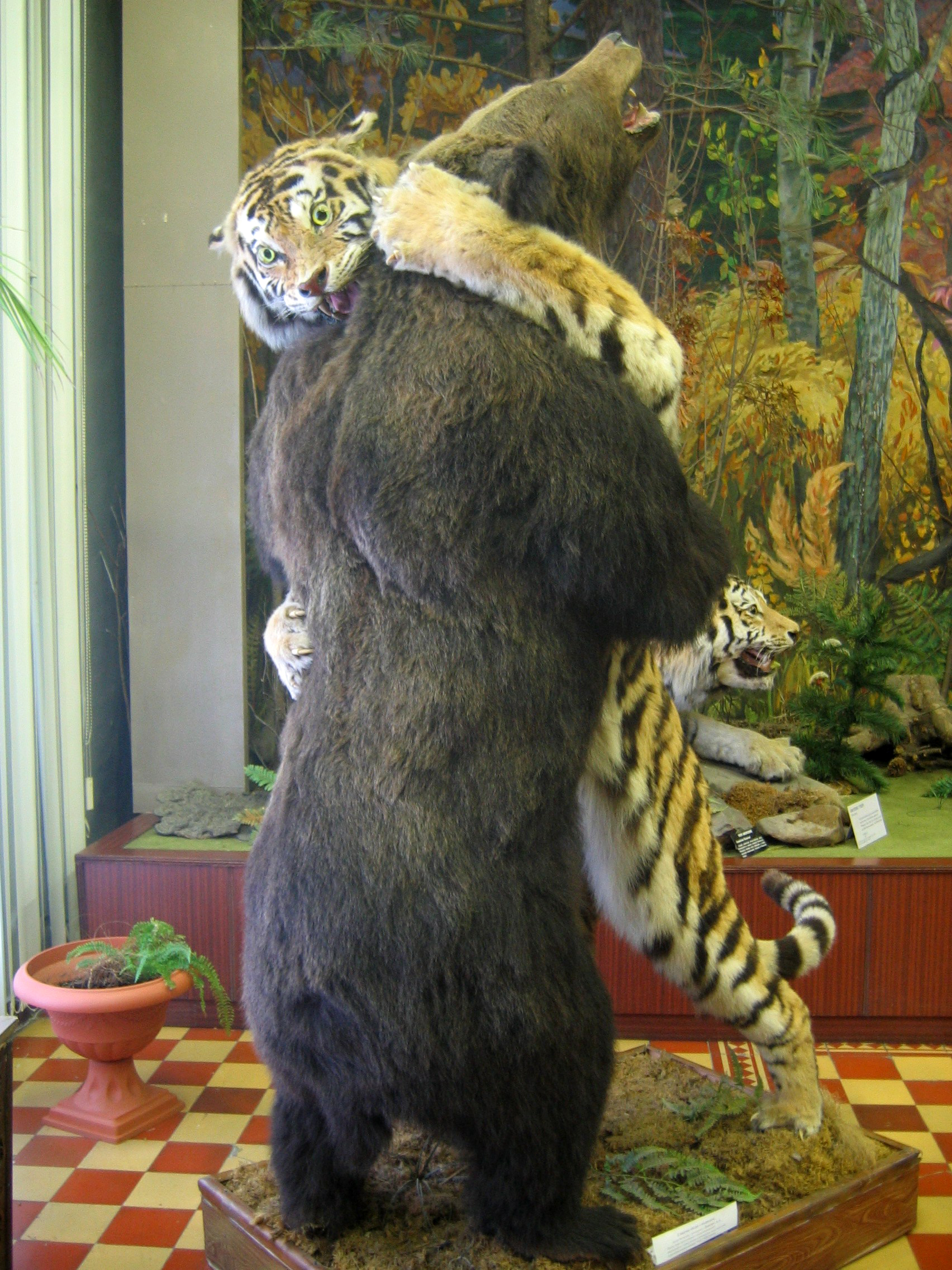
Taxidermy of a tiger and a bear at the museum.

The museum's original collections were procured by the Society for the Study of the Amur Region during the period between the museum's establishment in 1884, and its opening in 1890. These original collections focused on the region's history, ecosystem, and the indigenous culture of the region including an exhibit dedicated to the traditions of the indigenous people of Primorye. Exhibits established since the museum's inception include collections centered on the Russian conquest and exploration of Central Asia and Siberia from the 1600s to the 1800s, an exhibit of Ice Age fossils, a 12th century noble burial complex, and a mirror owned by the leader of the Balhae.

== See also ==
- Former British Consulate of Hakodate – another consulate that has also become a museum
