= General Mission of Palestine, Tokyo =

De facto embassy of Palestine in Japan

General Mission of Palestine in Japan سفارة دولة فلسطين لدى اليابان 駐日パレスチナ常駐総代表部
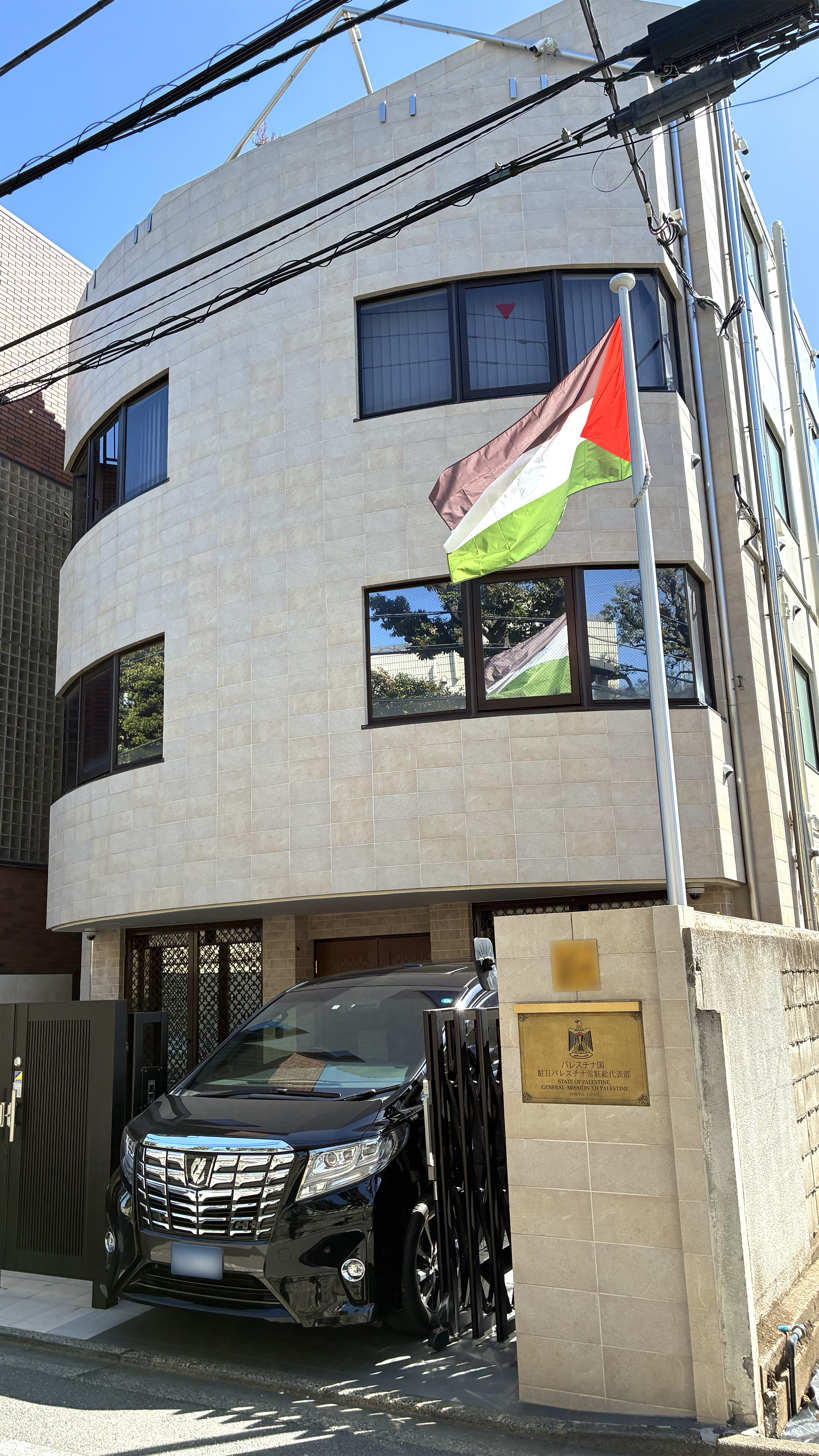
- Location: Japan
- Address: 3-6-3, Minami-Azabu, Minato, Tokyo
- Opened: 1977
- Relocated: 2023
- Ambassador: Waleed Ali Siam
- Website: https://www.palembjp.org/

The Permanent General Mission of Palestine in Tokyo (Arabic: سفارة دولة فلسطين لدى اليابان; Japanese: 駐日パレスチナ常駐総代表部) is the de facto embassy of Palestine in Japan. There is no official diplomatic relations between the two nations as Japan doesn't recognize Palestine as a sovereign state. Even though the Japanese government supports a two-state solution, the status quo over diplomatic relations persisted over the years with periodic state visits between the two nations.

== History ==
Palestine Liberation Organization operated a representative office in Tokyo from 1977 until 1995. Palestinian National Authority reopened the office under the current name of Permanent General Mission of Palestine in 2003. In 2023, the embassy building moved within Tokyo from Kōjimachi, Chiyoda to Minami-Azabu, Minato.

== Head of mission ==
The general mission is headed by an individual who holds the rank of ambassador. This individual is the head of mission from the Japanese perspective as they are not officially the ambassador of Palestine to Japan. They however hold the rank ambassador.

The incumbent head of mission is ambassador Waleed Ali Siam. He is also the dean of the Arab Diplomatic Corps in Japan.

List of previous heads of mission
No.	Name		Appointment	Dismissal	Remarks
No.	in English	in Arabic	Appointment	Dismissal	Remarks
1	Fathi Abdul Hamid	فتحي عبد الحميد	1977	1983	
2	Baker Abdel Munem	بكر عبد المنعم	1983	1995	
-	Vacant	شاغر	1995	2003	
3	Waleed Ali Siam	وليد علي صيام	2003	Present	

== See also ==
- Japan–Palestine relations
- List of diplomatic missions in Japan
- List of diplomatic missions of Palestine
