= Old Russian Consulate in Hakodate =

Former Russian and Soviet consulate in Hakodate, Japan

Old Russian Consulate
- 旧ロシア領事館
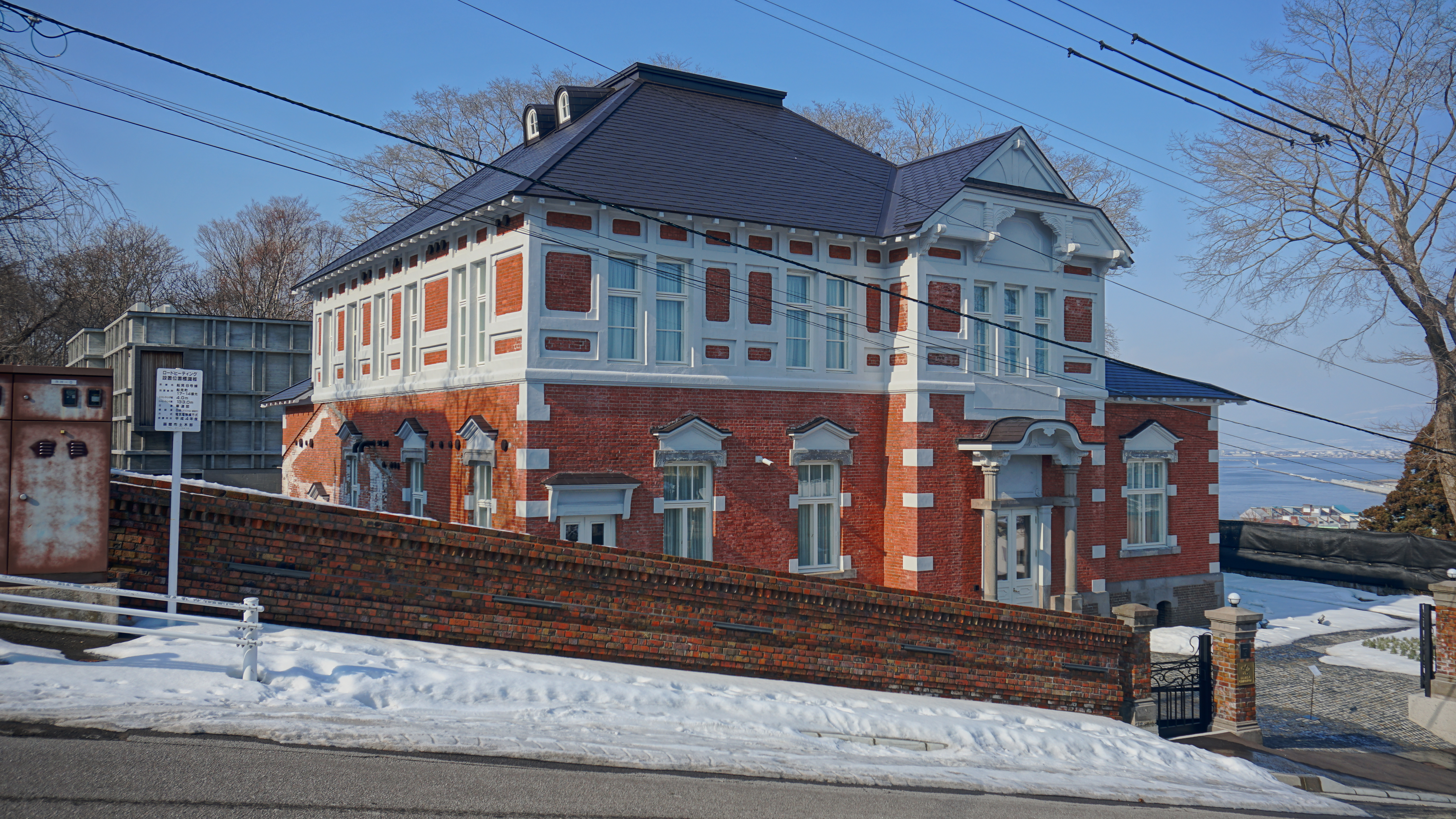
- Facade of the 1908 building
- Established: 1858
- Location: Hakodate, Japan

The Old Russian Consulate (Japanese: 旧ロシア領事館, Hepburn: Kyū Roshia ryōjikan; Russian: Старое русское консульство, romanized: Staroye russkoye konsul'stvo) is a former consulate of the Russian Empire in the port city of Hakodate, Japan. It hosted the first foreign consulate building and first Russian Orthodox church in the country.

== History ==
The consulate was first established in late 1858, with Iosif Goshkevich being the first consul posted there. However, the land earmarked for foreigners wasn't ready yet, so the consul, along with other diplomats, initially lived in local temples. After his arrival, Goshkevich got to work on negotiating for a more permanent solution. The Russians felt that the land allotted by the Japanese, then considered part of the "distant city suburbs" and described as "three kilometers removed from the city amidst windswept foothills", was suboptimal and argued that they should get an undeveloped lot closer to the city. However, the consulate building was built in 1859 along with a Russian Orthodox church in the form of a chapel for the consulate, both firsts in Japan, in addition a hospital and sauna on the originally designated site. According to the Russian embassy in Tokyo, in 1865 a mishandled fire in the British consul's residence spread to the Russian consul's dwellings, leading to the mission and its collections being mostly destroyed while the church was saved by firefighters. After a typhoon, the consulate was rebuilt, and the current building was completed in 1908. This building was designed by German architect Richard Seel and exhibits an "Art Deco-influenced wood frame and brick structure". The consulate remained in operation under the Russian Empire and the USSR until 1944.

Afterwards, the property was transferred to the jurisdiction of the Japanese Ministry of Foreign Affairs in 1952 and was then sold to the city of Hakodate in the 1960s, which used the building for educational seminars. The structure was no longer used after 1996 and as of 2021 the building's interior is often inaccessible to the public. It was last accessible in October 2020, six years after the last opening, when it hosted a tour for city residents organized by groups advocating for the preservation of the old consulate. This was in response to a plan announced by the city that year to sell the site; although there were provisions in place for preserving the building's exterior, there were still concerns from local organizations over the impact of such a sale, with some worrying that it could be demolished. In February 2021, it was announced that the property had been sold to a hotel based in Nagoya. Renovation and expansion started in March 2023 to reopen the property as a hotel and restaurant serving Russian cuisine, with a planned opening in March 2025.

== See also ==
- Former British Consulate of Hakodate
