= Ichigaya Sadoharacho =

Ichigaya Sadoharacho (市谷砂土原町) is a neighborhood in Shinjuku, Tokyo.

It is located in the eastern part of Shinjuku Ward. The northern part of the area borders Wakamiya-cho and Ichigaya Funagawara-cho. The eastern part of the area borders Ichigaya Tamachi. The southern part of the area borders Ichigaya Choenji-cho. The western part of the area borders Harakata-cho.

The town name comes from the fact that in the Edo period, Honda Sadonokami Masanobu had a villa there and it was called "Sadohara" (佐渡原). Later, soil was taken from the site of Honda's residence and used for landfill, so it came to be called a sand quarry.

The neighborhood does not have a subway stop but Ichigaya Station is close. The neighborhood hosts the headquarters of luxury supermarket Kinokuniya.

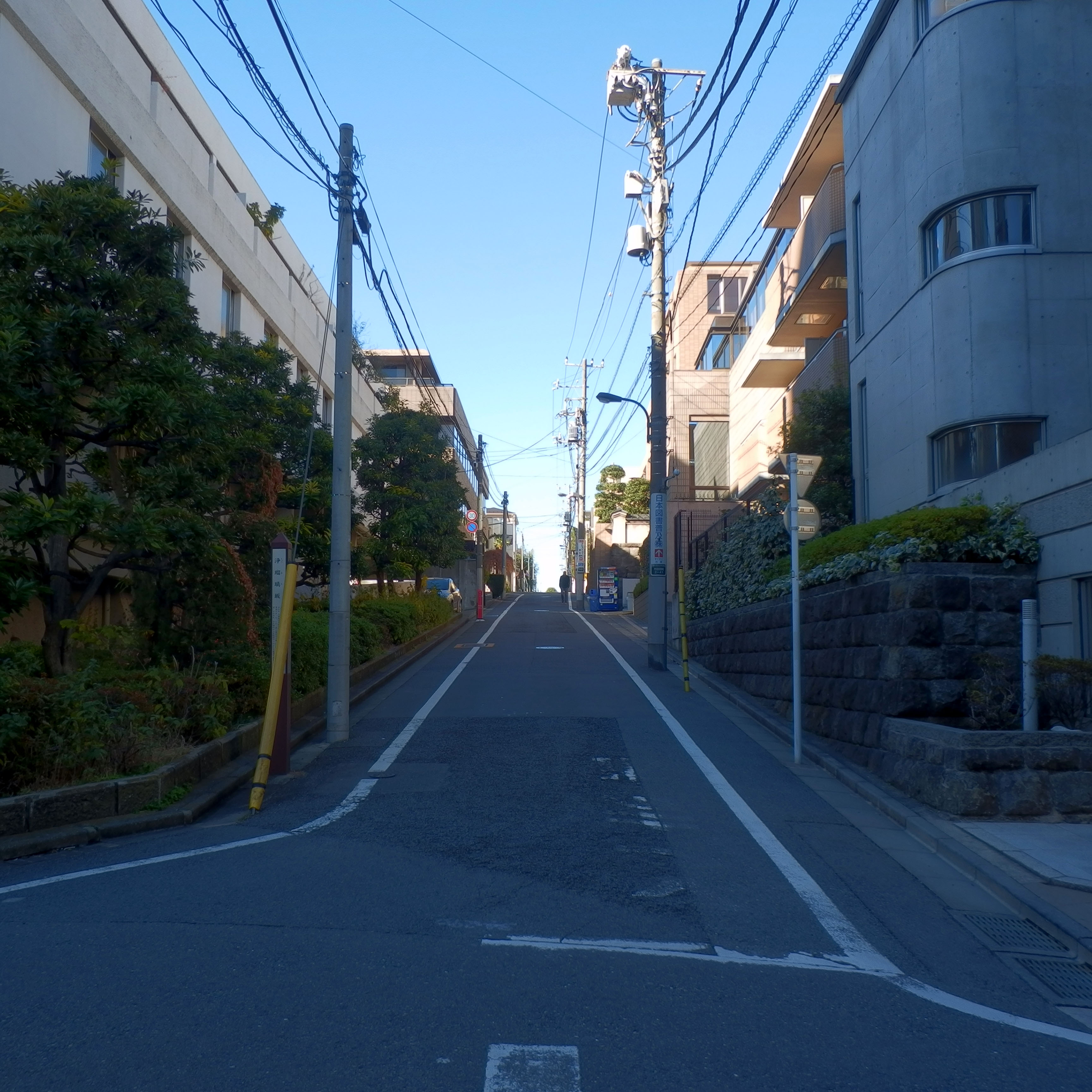
Jorurizaka (浄瑠璃坂) is a steep street in Ichigaya Sadoharacho
