= Former British Consulate of Hakodate =

Museum in Hakodate, Japan

- 函館市旧イギリス領事館
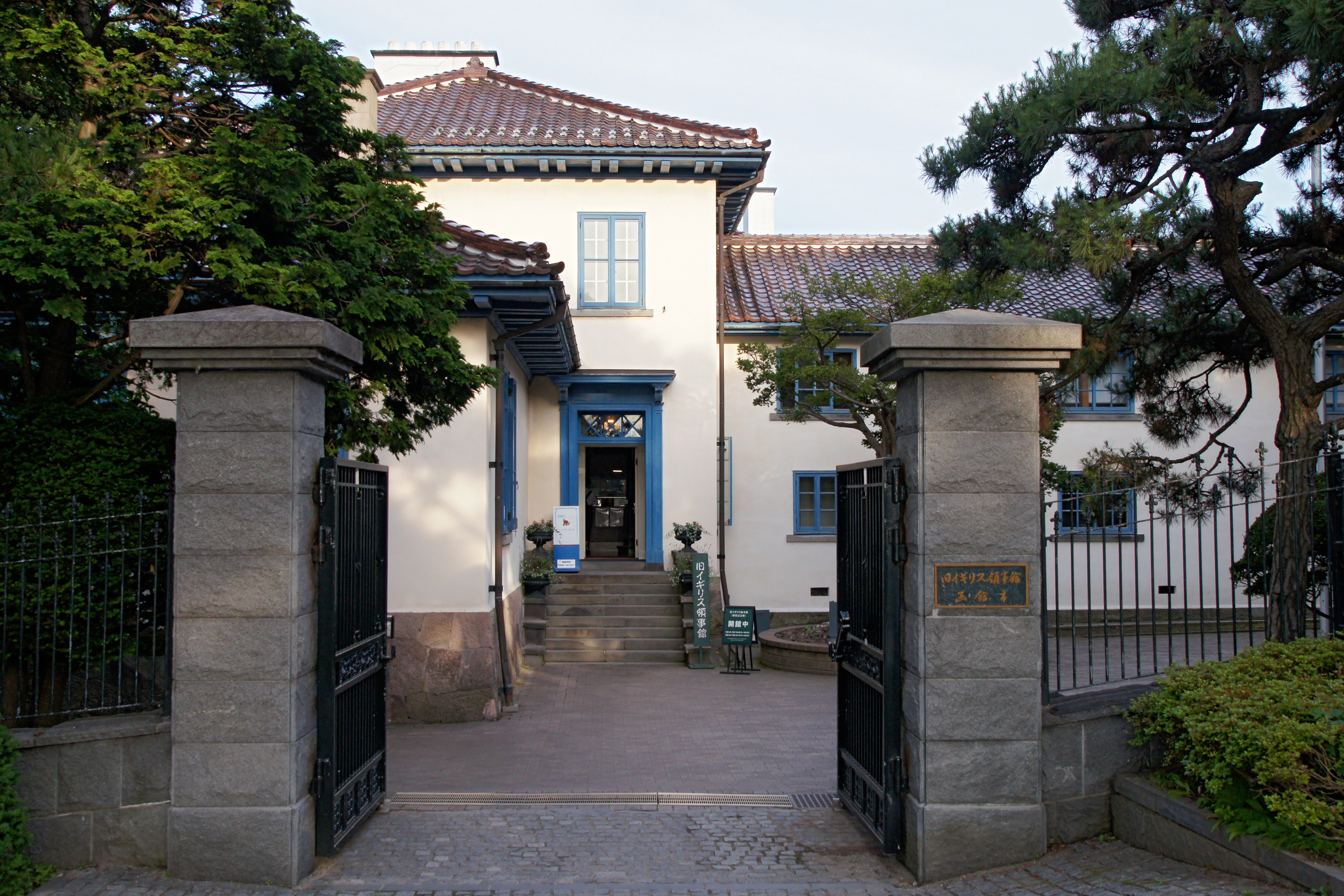
- Gate to the current 1913 building
- Location: Hakodate, Japan
- Coordinates: 41°45′57.4″N 140°42′38.5″E
- Website: hakodate-kankou.com/british

The Former British Consulate of Hakodate (Japanese: 函館市旧イギリス領事館, Hepburn: Hakodate-shi kyū Igirisu ryōjikan), also officially known as the Opening-Port Memorial Hall and commonly called the Old British Consulate, is a historic house museum meant to preserve the now-defunct consulate of the United Kingdom to Hakodate, Japan, and memorialise the opening of Hokkaido to foreign trade.

== History ==
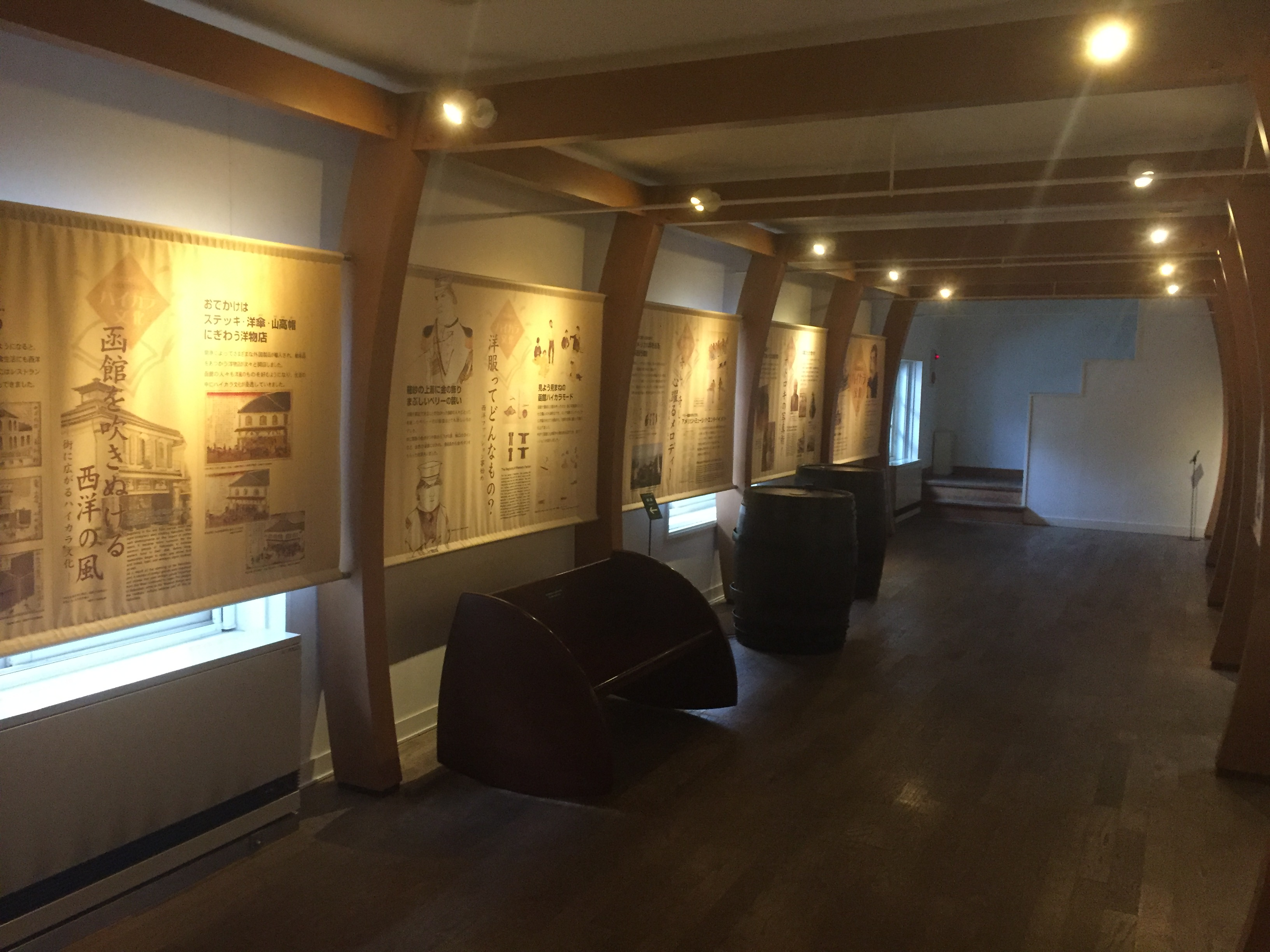
The exhibition hall for the opening of Hakodate to foreigners in the museum.

Hakodate was one of the first Japanese ports to open up to foreign trade after the Perry Expedition alongside Yokohama and Nagasaki in 1859. In response, a number of countries, along with all the other buildings they had constructed, set up consulates there. The United Kingdom established a consulate there the same year, being the third opened after the consulates of the United States and Russia. It was moved from its original location to a plot next to the Orthodox church at the Russian consulate four years later. The site was affected by a number of fires, which led to the repeated rebuilding of the consulate; the current building was finished in 1913 and hosted the British Consulate until it closed in 1934.

The building then saw use as a city hospital. In 1979, the city of Hakodate gave the building the designation of "tangible culture property", later converting it into its current status as a "memorial hall" in 1992 and opening it to the public after being restored two years later. It is currently host to exhibits on the opening of Hakodate on the first floor, a recreation of the consul's office and living room, alongside other displays, on the second floor, and a tea room named "Victoria Rose".

== See also ==
- Vladimir K. Arseniev Museum of Far East History – another consulate that has also become a museum
- Old Russian Consulate in Hakodate
