= Khalil Bin Ebrahim Hassan =

Bahraini Ambassador to Japan
- Incumbent
- Assumed office 2005
- Monarch: Hamad bin Isa Al Khalifa
- Preceded by: Position created

Minister of Health
- In office 2002–2005
- Monarch: Hamad bin Isa Al Khalifa
- Succeeded by: Eventually Faeqa bint Saeed Al Saleh

Personal details
- Children: 5
- Education: Damascus University; Royal College of Surgeons in Ireland
- Occupation: Diplomat
- Profession: Pediatric surgeon

Khalil Bin Ebrahim Hassan (Arabic: خليل بن إبراهيم حسن) is a Bahraini surgeon and diplomat who has been the first Ambassador of the Kingdom of Bahrain to Japan (since 2005) and was also the country's health minister.

== Biography ==
Khalil Bin Ebrahim Hassan graduated from Damascus University Medical School in 1972. Throughout the rest of the decade he worked in the United Kingdom before returning to Bahrain and working there in several hospitals during the 1980s. During the 1990s, Hassan was a professor in a university before being appointed minister of health of Bahrain in 2002. He was appointed the kingdom's ambassador to Japan in 2005, when Bahrain first opened an embassy in the country.

== Personal life ==
He is married and has two daughters and three sons. His hobbies include golf, photography, tennis, squash, swimming, traveling.
