= Japan–Kosovo relations =

- Japan: Kosovo

Diplomatic mission
- Embassy of Japan, Pristina: Embassy of Kosovo, Tokyo

Envoy
- Ambassador Akira Mizutani: Ambassador Sabri Kiçmari

Japan–Kosovo relations are foreign relations between Japan and Kosovo. Kosovo declared its independence from Serbia on February 17, 2008, and Japan recognized it on March 18, 2008. According to the Japanese Ministry of Foreign Affairs, Japan and Kosovo established diplomatic relations on February 25, 2009.

== History ==
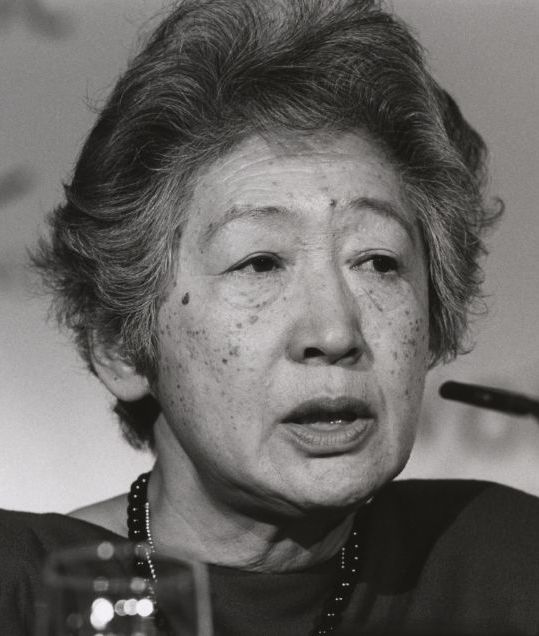
Dr. Sadako Ogata, the late Japanese-born UN High Commissioner for Refugees

Sadako Ogata, the Japanese-born UN High Commissioner for Refugees, issued an official statement in November 1998 which revealed the violence and abuse that civilians in Kosovo faced every day; an estimated 175,000 people remained displaced inside Kosovo. She demonstrated on the report a lasting commitment to protect Kosovar refugees and returnees and to seek solutions to relevant problems there. In order to cease the appalling violence and to regain peace and prosperity in Kosovo as soon as possible, the Government of Japan declared in April 1999 to provide assistance to international organizations and the neighboring countries which accepted numerous Kosovar refugees, including the UNHCR, Albania and Macedonia.

Kosovo declared its independence from Serbia on February 17, 2008, and Japan recognized it on March 18, 2008. Japan is the third Asian country which recognized the Republic of Kosovo after Afghanistan and Turkey.

The embassy of Kosovo was opened in Tokyo on July 16, 2010. Japan had no embassy in Pristina until January 1, 2020.

Japanese Prime Minister Shinzo Abe proposed the launch of the Western Balkans Cooperation Initiative on his visit to several Southeast European countries in January 2018. Although he did not visit Kosovo at that time, the scheme emphasized that Japan would strengthen bilateral assistance, support regional cooperation and establish new embassies to the Western Balkan countries including the Republic of Kosovo. As a part of the initiative, two years later, the embassy of Japan was opened in Pristina.

== High-level visits ==
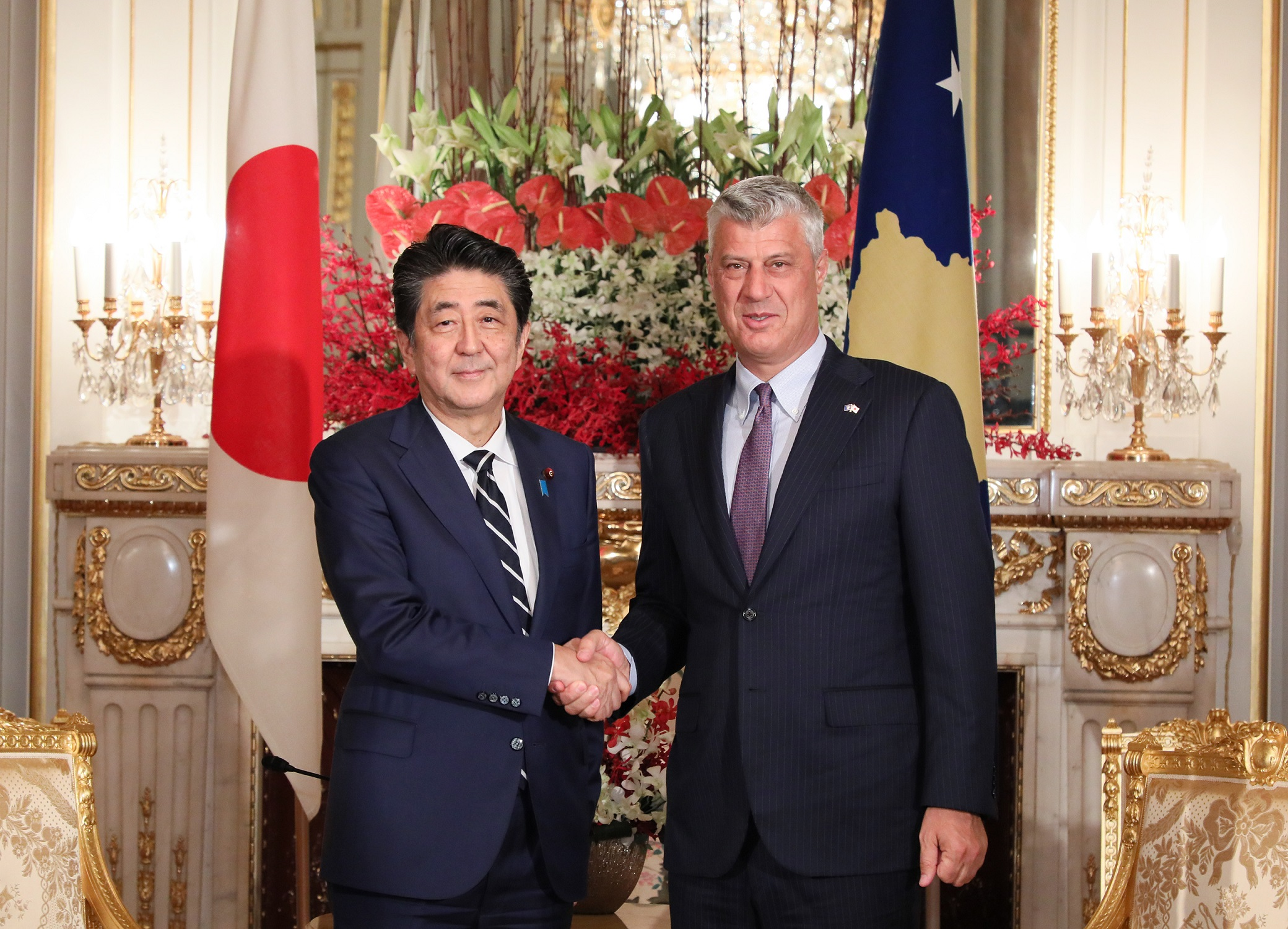
Japanese PM Shinzo Abe with Kosovan President Hashim Thaçi at the State Guest House, Akasaka Palace in Tokyo. President Thaçi has visited Japan four times, as Prime Minister twice and as President twice.

=== High-level visits from Japan to Kosovo ===
- December 1999: Foreign Minister Yōhei Kōno
- April 2005: Parliamentary Secretary for Foreign Affairs Itsunori Onodera
- May 2006: Vice-Minister for Foreign Affairs Akiko Yamanaka
- September 2009: Parliamentary Vice-Minister for Foreign Affairs Kazuyuki Hamada
- February 2018: Parliamentary Vice-Minister for Foreign Affairs Manabu Horii
- February 2019: State Minister for Foreign Affairs Toshiko Abe

=== High-level visits from Kosovo to Japan ===
(February 2000: UNMIK Special Representative Bernard Kouchner)

- April 2004: Prime Minister Bajram Rexhepi
- December 2011: Minister of Foreign Affairs Enver Hoxhaj and Minister of Environment and Spatial Planning Dardan Gashi
- June 2012: Prime Minister Hashim Thaçi with Minister of Foreign Affairs Enver Hoxhaj, Minister of Education, Science and Technology Ramë Buja and Minister of Finance Bedri Hamza
- September 2013: Deputy Minister of Trade and Industry Bernard Nikaj with Chief Executive at Investment Promotion Agency Valdrin Lluka
- October 2013: Minister of Education, Science and Technology Ramë Buja
- April 2014: Prime Minister Hashim Thaçi with Minister of Finance Besim Beqaj and Minister of Trade and Industry Bernard Nikaj
- March 2018: First Deputy Prime Minister and Minister of Foreign Affairs Behgjet Pacolli with Economic Development Minister Valdrin Lluka
- March 2019: Chairman of Kosovo Assembly Kadri Veseli
- September 2019: President Hashim Thaçi
- October 2019: President Hashim Thaçi
- July 2021: President Vjosa Osmani
- September 2022: Prime Minister Albin Kurti
- June 2025: President Vjosa Osmani

== Sports ==
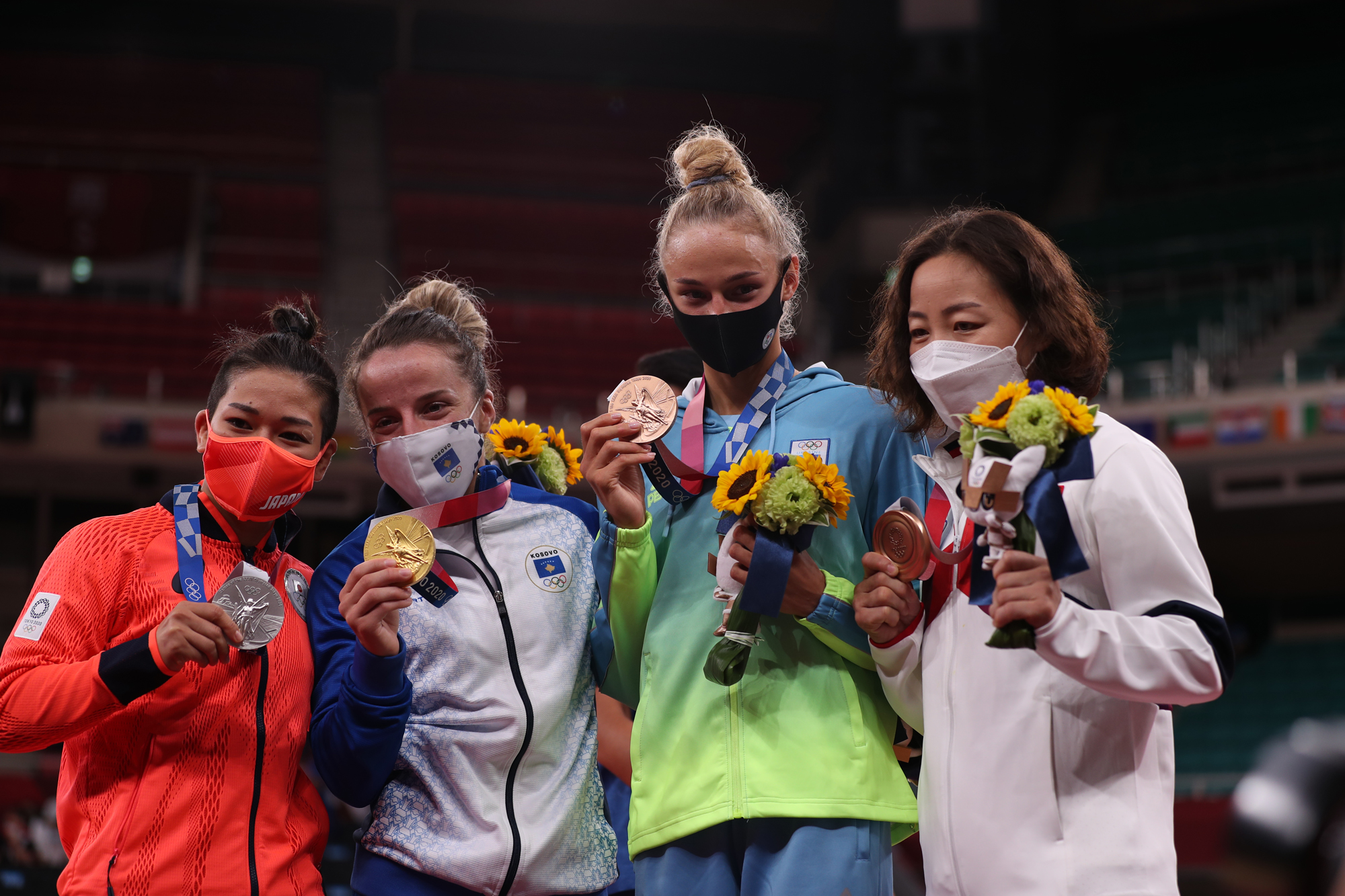
Kosovan judoka Distria Krasniqi (center left) won her first gold medal at Olympic Games against Japanese judoka Funa Tonaki (left).

Judo, a Japanese origin martial art, was included into the Summer Olympic Games as an official sport for men in 1964 and for women in 1992. The Kosovo Judo Federation was accepted into the International Judo Federation and the European Judo Union in 2012. Kosovar-Albanian judoka Majlinda Kelmendi achieved a great success and victory by winning the first gold medal for Kosovo at the 2016 Summer Olympics in Rio de Janeiro. Kosovan judoka Distria Krasniqi won the gold medal in the women's under 48kg competition at the Tokyo 2020 Olympics, held in 2021 due to the global COVID-19 pandemic; this was the first gold medal for Kosovo at Tokyo 2020 and the second for Kosovo at the Olympic Games.

== See also ==
- Albania–Japan relations
- Foreign relations of Japan
- Foreign relations of Kosovo
- Japan–Serbia relations
- Japan–Yugoslavia relations
