= Japan–Yugoslavia relations =

- Japan: Yugoslavia

Empire of Japan–Kingdom of Yugoslavia relations
- Japan: Yugoslavia

Japan and Yugoslavia (both the Kingdom of Yugoslavia and the Socialist Federal Republic of Yugoslavia) enjoyed friendly relations until the breakup of Yugoslavia in 1992. Japan appreciated Socialist Yugoslavia's independent non-aligned foreign policy stance.

The representation of the Kingdom of Yugoslavia in Tokyo was opened in 1924 while the agreement of trade between the two countries was signed in Vienna in 1925. Yugoslav honorary consulate in Osaka was opened in 1929.

Yugoslavia was invited, but did not participate, in the San Francisco Peace Conference in 1951 as Belgrade believed that there was no open issue between the two states and that the state of war could be ended by a simple exchange of notes without any reparations. The two countries reestablished their bilateral relations in 1952 and Japan opened its representation in Belgrade that same year. Yugoslavia was the first communist country to establish diplomatic relations with Japan. Representations of both countries were upgraded to the level of embassies in 1957. In 1965, the Japanese architect Kenzo Tange was invited by the United Nations to enter a limited competition for the redevelopment of Skopje, capital of the Yugoslav constituent Socialist Republic of Macedonia, after devastating 1963 Skopje earthquake.

President of Yugoslavia Josip Broz Tito visited Japan during the cherry blossom season of 1968. Crown Prince Akihito and Princess Michiko visited Yugoslavia in 1976.

Following the breakup of Yugoslavia and Yugoslav Wars judge Chikako Taya from Japan served at the International Criminal Tribunal for the former Yugoslavia.

== See also ==
- Yugoslavia and the Non-Aligned Movement
- Tsuneko Kondo-Kavese
- Croatia–Japan relations
- Japan–Kosovo relations
- Japan–Montenegro relations
- Japan–North Macedonia relations
- Japan–Serbia relations
