= Tsuneko =

- Gender: Female

Origin
- Origin: Japanese
- Meaning: Different meanings depending on the kanji used

Tsuneko (written: 恒子 or つね子) is a feminine Japanese given name. Notable people with the name include:

- Tsuneko Furuta (古田 つね子; born 1921), Japanese swimmer
- Tsuneko Kondo-Kavese (近藤 恒子; 1893–1963), Japanese nurse
- Tsuneko Nakazato (中里 恒子; 1909–1987), pen-name of Nakazato Tsune, Japanese writer
- Tsuneko Okazaki (岡崎 恒子; born 1933), Japanese scientist
- Tsuneko Sasamoto (笹本 恒子; 1914–2022), Japanese photographer
- Tsuneko Taniuchi, Japanese performance artist
