= Embassy of Japan, Warsaw =

Diplomatic mission of Japan in Poland

Embassy of Japan in Poland
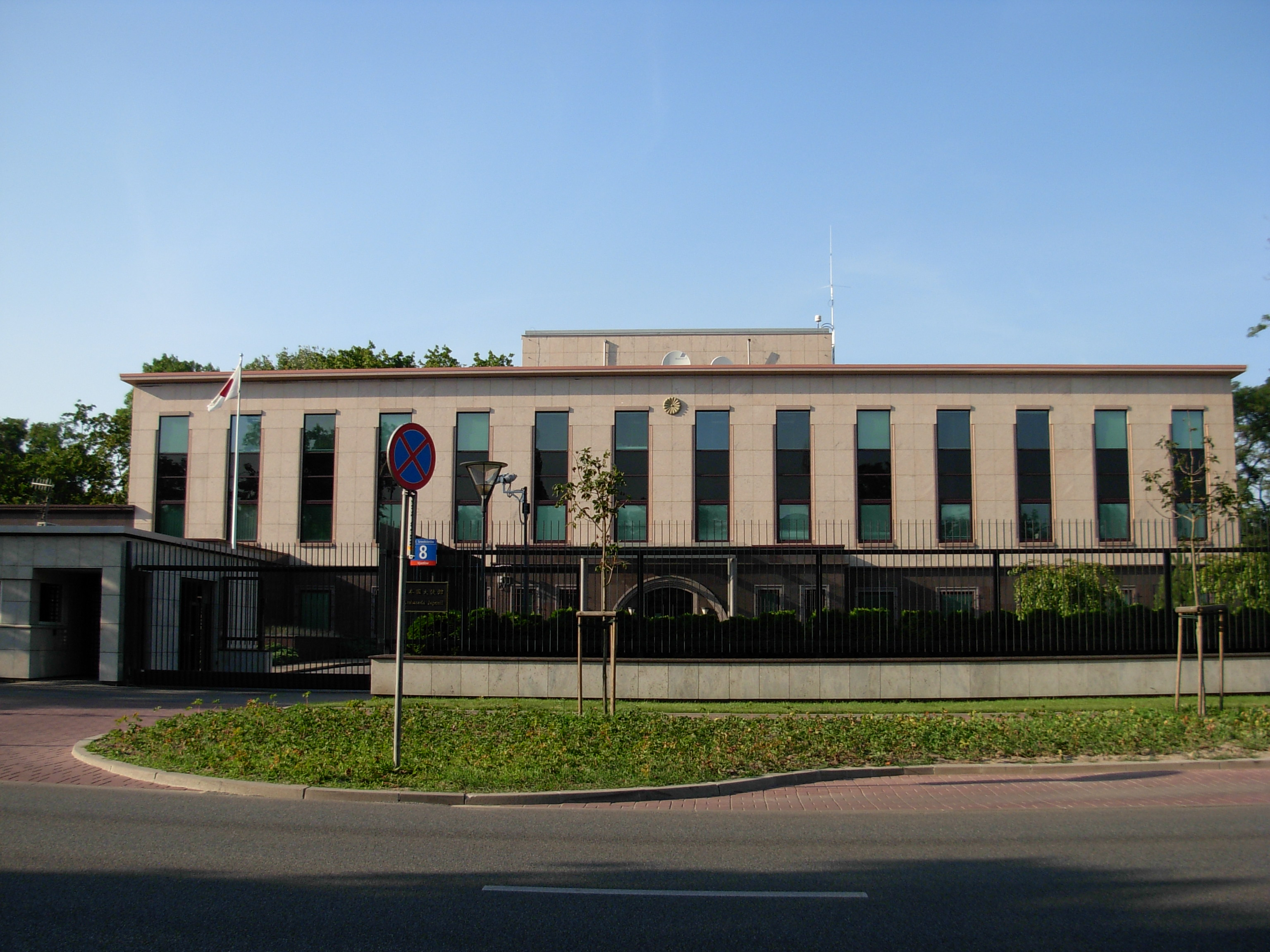
- The embassy building in 2007.
- Location: 8 Szwoleżerów 8 Street, 00-464; Warsaw, Poland,
- Coordinates: 52°13′01.56″N 21°02′26.70″E
- Opened: 1919; 107 years ago (beginning of the mission); 2000; 26 years ago (current building)
- Ambassador: Akira Kono
- Jurisdiction: Poland
- Website: pl.emb-japan.go.jp

The Embassy of Japan in Poland (Polish: Ambasada Japonii w Polsce; Japanese: 在ポーランド日本国大使館, zai-Pōrando Nihon-koku Taishikan) is an diplomatic mission of Japan in Warsaw, Poland, located at 8 Szwoleżerów Street. Current ambassador is Akira Kono.

== History ==
Poland and Japan begun their diplomatic relations in 1919. The same year, Japan opened a military diplomatic mission, which in 1921 was elevated to the rank of a legation, and in 1921, to a consulate. Originally, it was headquartered at 45 Zielna Street, moving to 2 Róż Avenue in 1921, and to the Przeździecka Palace at 10 Foksal Street in 1923. In 1937, it was elevated to the rank of an embassy. The building burned down in September 1939, during the Siege of Warsaw.

Poland and Japan renewed and normalized their diplomatic relations in 1957. In 1958, an embassy was opened at the Grand Hotel at 28 Krucza Street, and moved a year later to 7 Willowa Street, where it remained until 1993. Then it moved to 11 Grażyna Street, and in 1996, to the Atrium International Business Center at 23 John Paul Avenue. In 2000, the embassy moved to a new building at 8 Szwoleżerów Street, designed by firms Ingarden & Ewý Architekci and Ishimoto Architects.

== Administrative division ==
- Political Division
- Consular Division
- Economy and Economic Cooperation Division
  - Japanese Foreign Trade Centre, a representative of the Japanese Foreign Trade Organization JETRO (日本貿易振興機構, Nihon Bōeki Shinkōkikō), in Spektrum Tower at 18 Twarda Street
- Japanese School in Warsaw at 7 Kormoraków Street

== See also ==
- Embassy of Poland, Tokyo
