= Poles in Japan =

Polish diaspora in Japan

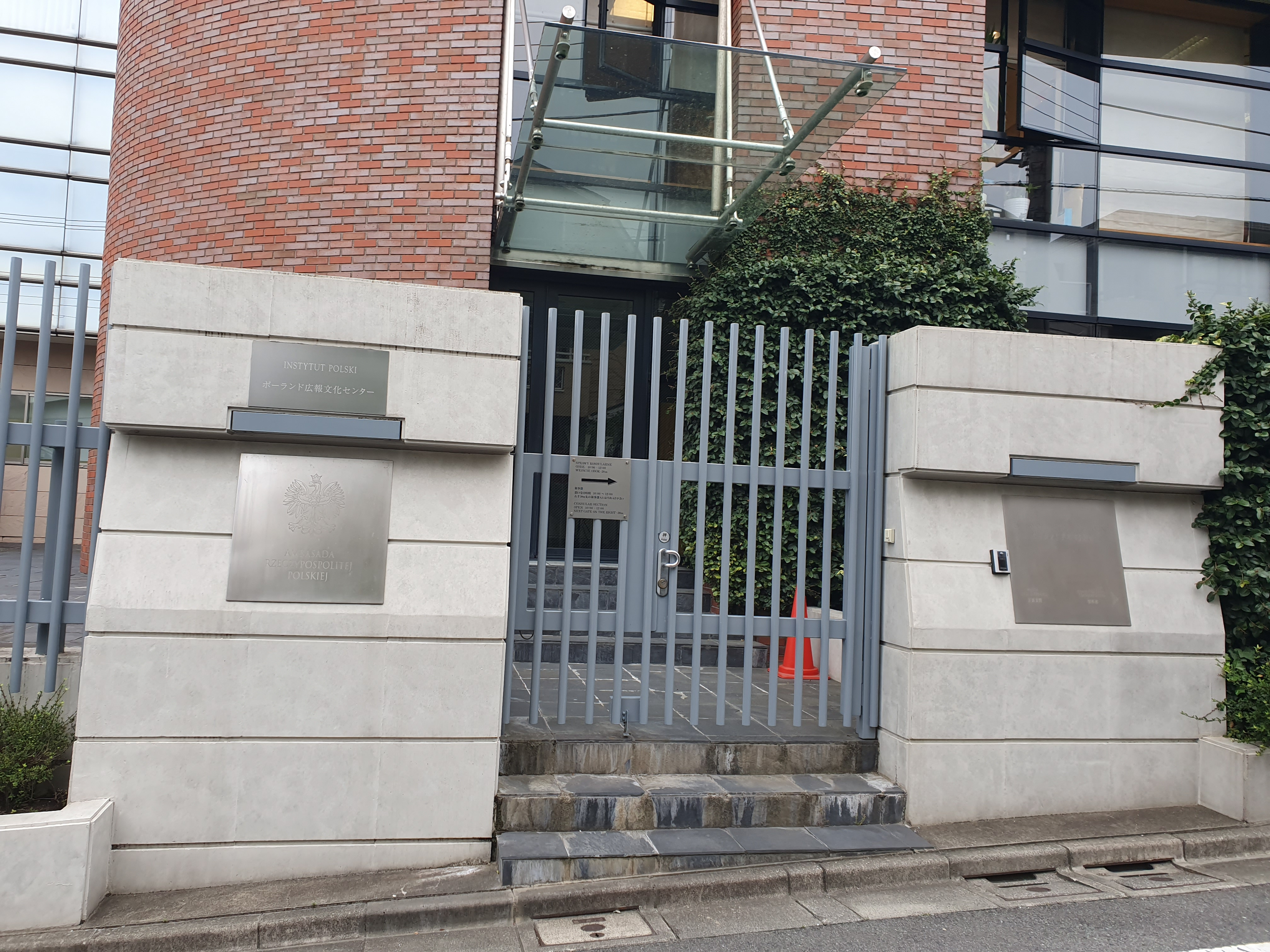
- Polish Institute in Tokyo

Total population
- 1,865 (2024)

Regions with significant populations
- Tokyo, Kantō region, Kansai region

Languages
- Polish, Japanese

Religion
- Christianity and Judaism

Poles in Japan form a small population of 1,510 (as of 2023), yet the largest Polish diaspora in East Asia.

Most Poles in Japan are either from mixed Polish-Japanese marriages, educated professionals working in Japan, students, or Catholic clergy.

== History ==
The first non-clergymen Poles to arrive in Japan were the famous adventurer Maurycy Beniowski and his close companion Antoni Straszewski, who arrived in 1771 after a daring escape from Russian exile in Kamchatka. It was also the first Polish ship to arrive in Japan, as they sailed under the Polish flag aboard a seized Russian galiot. Beniowski's expedition was warmly received by the Japanese, an exchange of gifts took place, and sailing southward, Beniowski stopped at several Japanese islands.

The most sizeable Polish community of early 20th-century Japan lived in the Karafuto Prefecture, which further grew since 1925, as many Poles fled Soviet Russian persecution in northern Sakhalin. Poles in Karafuto engaged in unrestricted social, cultural and economic activities, and a Polish library was established in Toyohara. In 1924, Karafuto was visited by Polish ambassador to Japan Stanisław Patek, and many local Poles were granted Polish citizenship and passports. Some 300 Poles lived in Japan, according to estimates from 1929. In 1930, two Catholic churches were built in Toyohara and Odomari, co-funded by Poles from Poland and Karafuto. Only a handful of Poles lived in other parts of Japan.

In 1920–1922, 769 Polish orphans rescued from Siberia, were admitted by the Japanese in Tokyo and Osaka, before their return to Poland.

== Culture ==
There are Polish associations in Tokyo and Osaka, and a Polish school in Tokyo.

== Notable people ==
- Maximilian Kolbe (1894–1941), Conventual Franciscan friar
- Nicole Fujita (born 1998), model and tarento
- Bronisław Piłsudski (1866–1918), ethnologist
- Zeno Żebrowski (c. 1898–1982), Conventual Franciscan friar

=== In fiction ===
- Lucyna Kushinada, half-Polish character in Cyberpunk: Edgerunners

== See also ==
- Japan–Poland relations
- Polish diaspora
- Immigration to Japan
- History of the Jews in Kobe

== Bibliography ==
- Grochowski, Kazimierz (1928). Polacy na Dalekim Wschodzie (in Polish). Harbin.
