= Japan–North Macedonia relations =

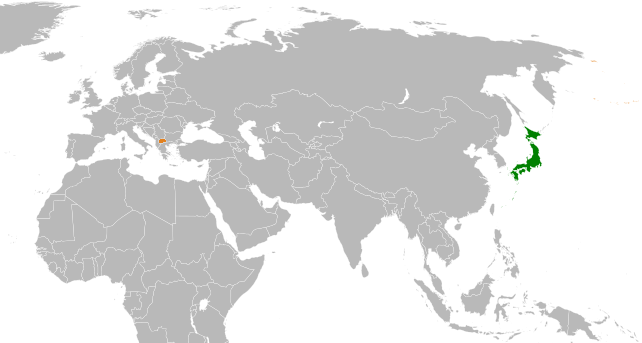

- Japan: North Macedonia

Diplomatic mission
- Embassy of Japan, Skopje: Embassy of North Macedonia, Tokyo

Japan–North Macedonia relations are foreign relations between Japan and the Republic of North Macedonia. Both countries established diplomatic relations in March 1994.

== Diplomatic missions ==
- Japan has an embassy in Skopje.
- North Macedonia opened its first resident embassy in Tokyo in 2013 and the first resident ambassador of North Macedonia to Japan is H.E. Dr. Andrijana Cvetkovik

== See also ==
- Foreign relations of Japan
- Foreign relations of North Macedonia
- Japan–Yugoslavia relations
