= Croatia–Japan relations =

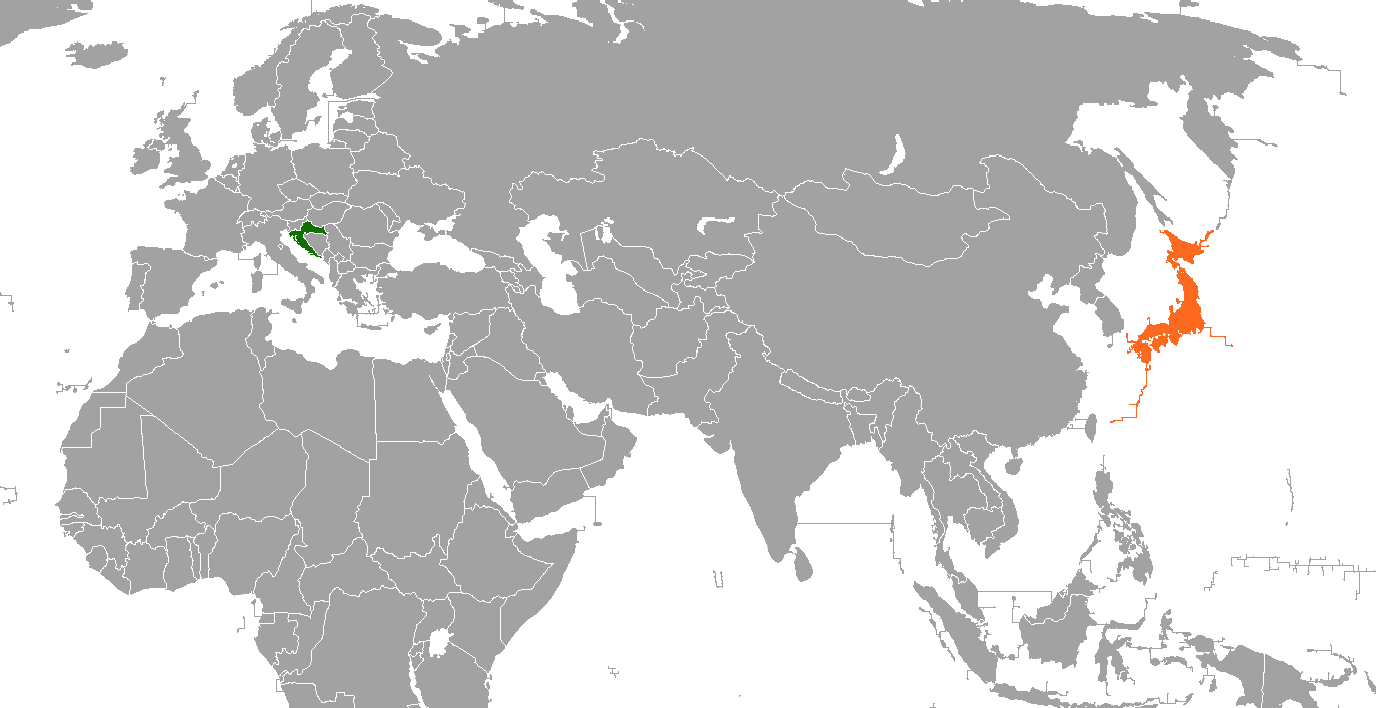

- Croatia: Japan

Croatia and Japan maintain diplomatic relations through their respective embassies.

== History ==
The two countries established diplomatic relations on 5 March 1993. The Embassy of Croatia in Tokyo was founded in September 1993, while the Japanese Embassy in Zagreb was opened in February 1998.

During World War II, the Empire of Japan maintained an embassy in Zagreb and recognized the Independent State of Croatia, which was a puppet state of Nazi Germany; both were part of the Axis powers.

== Military ties ==
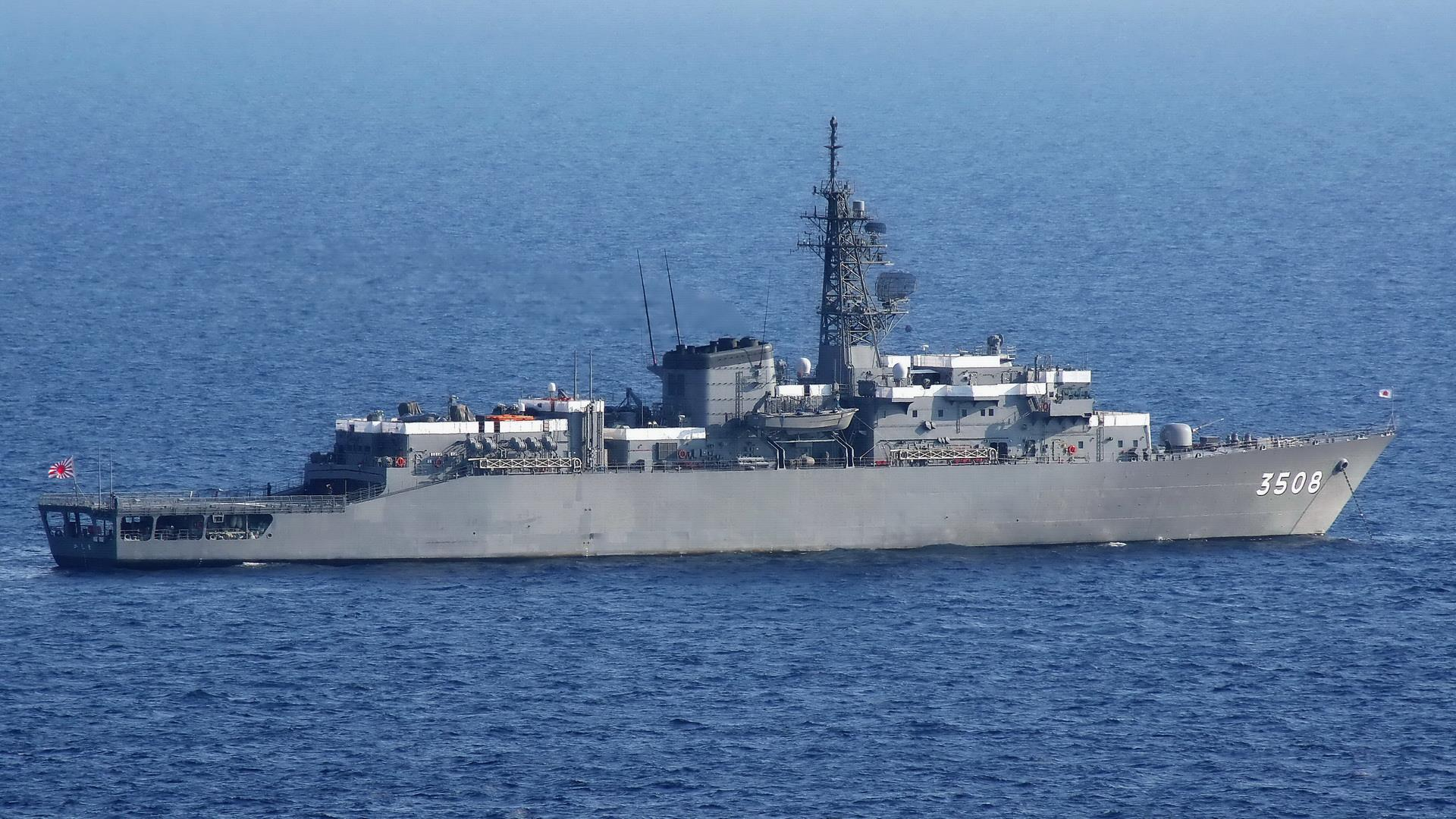
Japanese training ship Kashima as seen in Split, Croatia on September 2, 2013.

Croatia officially joined NATO on 1 April 2009. Since its accession to the military alliance, Croatia and Japan have shared a common ally in the United States.

A training ship of the Japan Maritime Self-Defense Force (JMSDF) JDS Kashima visited to Split, the second-largest city in Croatia for celebrating 20th anniversary of diplomatic relations between both countries in September 2013. This is the first visit ever to Croatia by a Japanese naval vessel. A fellowship reception, which included a joint performance by the JMSDF Band and the Croatian Navy Band, was held aboard the Kashima while it was anchored in the Port of Split. Former President of Croatia Stjepan Mesić, Japanese Ambassador Masaru Tsuji, JMSDF Rear Admiral Fumiyuki Kitagawa, dozens of military personnel from both navies, and members of the general public attended.

== Sister cities ==
- (Croatia) Rijeka – (Japan) Kawasaki (since 23 June 1977)
- (Croatia) Zagreb – (Japan) Kyoto (since 22 October 1981)
- (Croatia) Pula – (Japan) Hekinan (since 5 April 2007)

== Resident diplomatic missions ==
- Croatia has an embassy in Tokyo.
- Japan has an embassy in Zagreb.
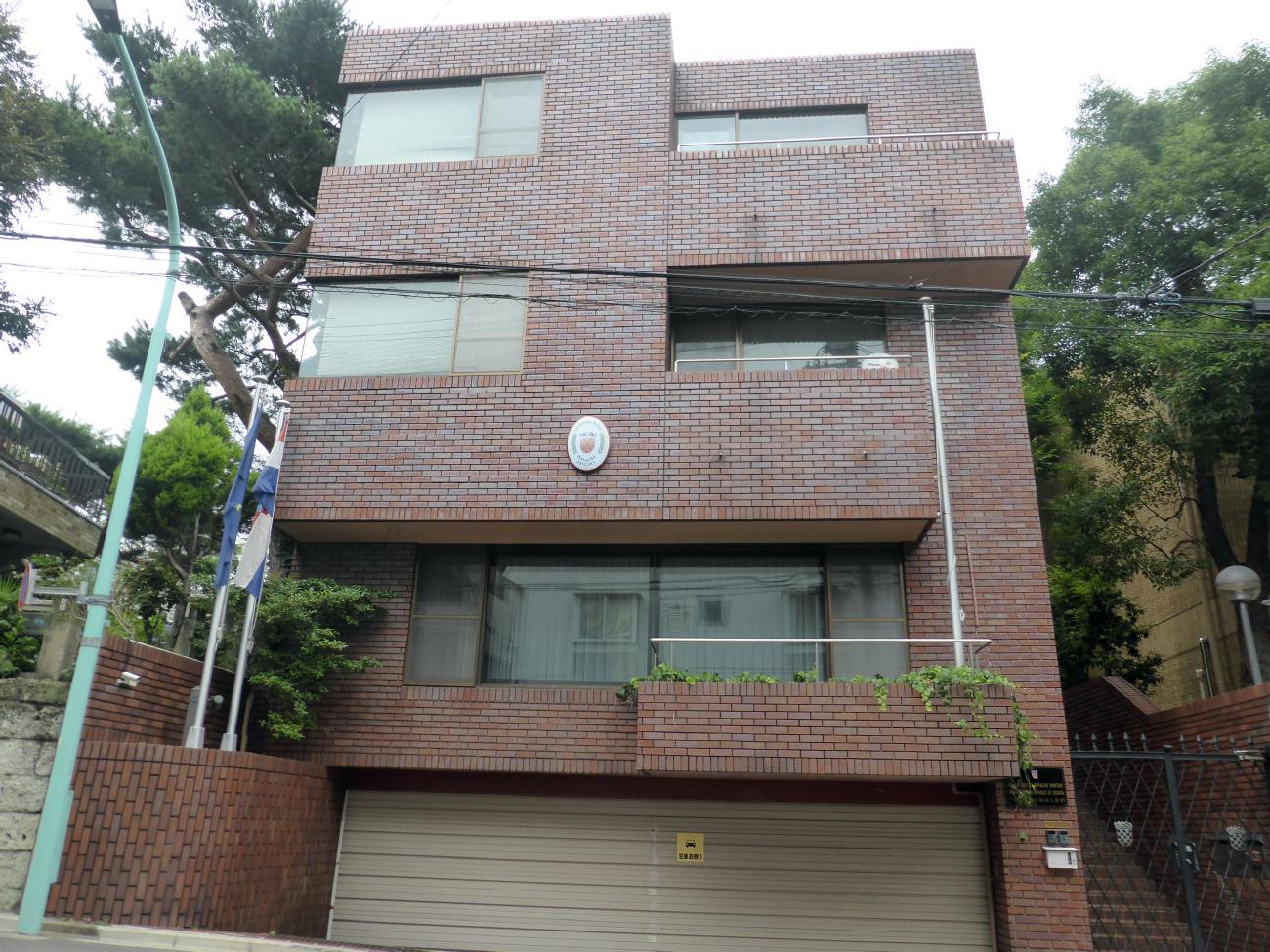
Embassy of Croatia in Tokyo

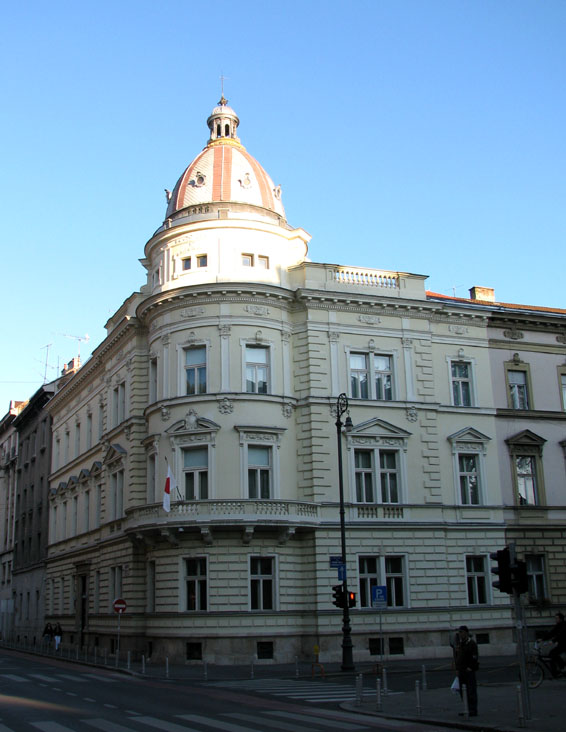
Embassy of Japan in Zagreb

== See also ==
- Foreign relations of Croatia
- Foreign relations of Japan
- Japan–Yugoslavia relations
