= Maria Przeździecka Palace =

Palace in Warsaw, Poland

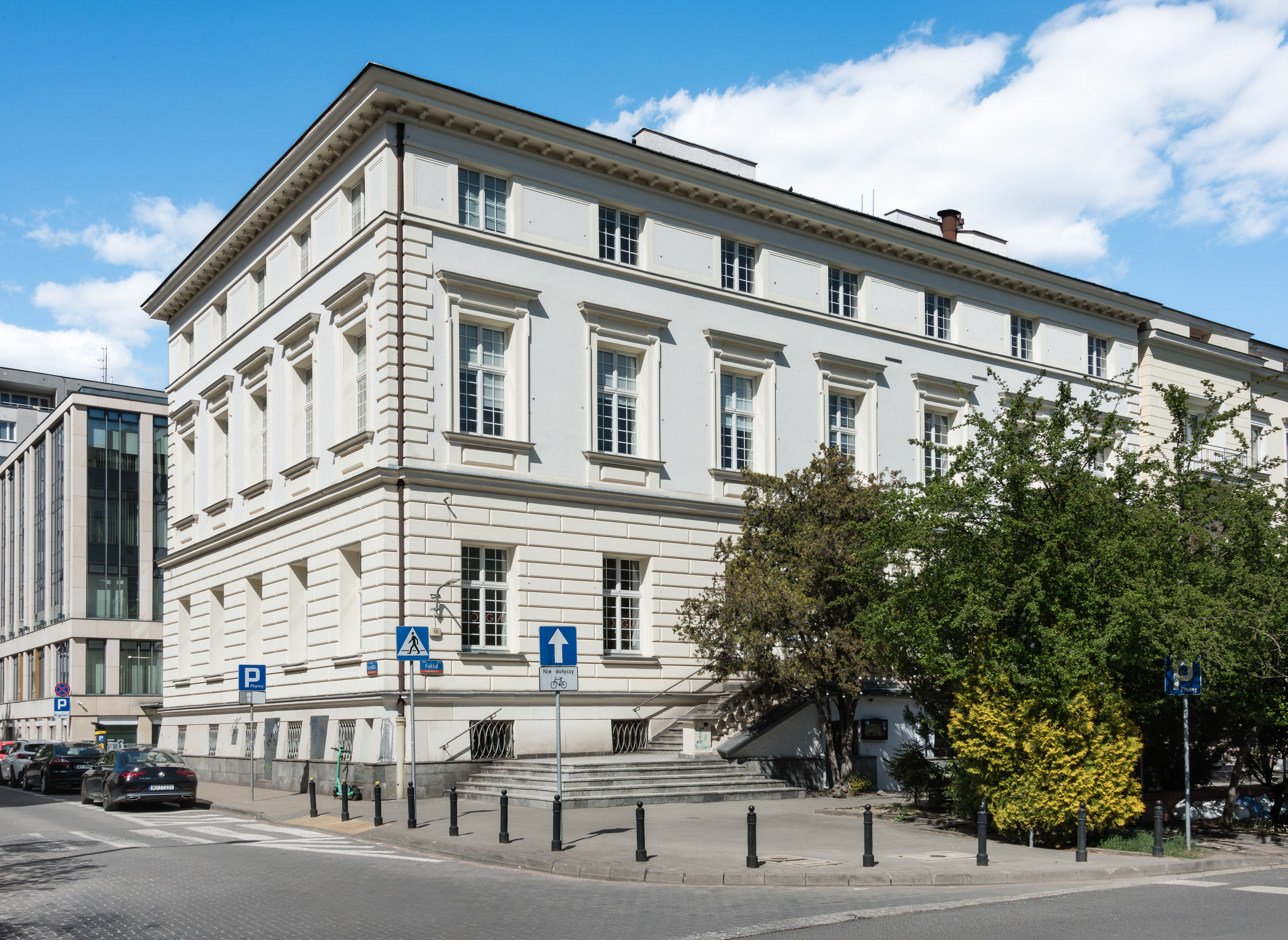
- Palace in 2026.
- Interactive map of the Maria Przeździecka Palace area

General information
- Location: Downtown, Warsaw, Poland, 10 Foksal Street
- Coordinates: 52°14′04.16″N 21°01′22.15″E
- Completed: c. 1890
- Renovated: 1950s
- Demolished: 1939

The Maria Przeździecka Palace (Polish pronunciation: [ˈma.rja pʂɛˈʑd͡ʑɛt͡s.ka]; Polish: Pałac Marii Przeździeckiej) is a historic residential building in Warsaw, Poland, at 10 Foksal Street, within the North Downtown neighbourhood. It was constructed around 1890, and destroyed in 1939. It was reconstructed in the 1950s.

== History ==
The building was built around 1890 for countess Maria Przeździecka. Since 1925, it was rented by the consulate of Japan. In 1935, the building was given to Przeździecka's granddaughter, Jadwiga Grocholska, who, in 1936, sold it for 600,000 zloties to the government of Japan. In 1937, the constulate was elevated to the rank of an embassy. The building burned down in September 1939, during the Siege of Warsaw. It was rebuilt in the 1950s, and from 1962 to 2004, it housed the Soviet, and later Russian cultural centre, originally known as the Soviet House of Science and Culture, and later called the Russian House. In 2012, the building was entered into the heritage list.
