= Japan–Poland relations =

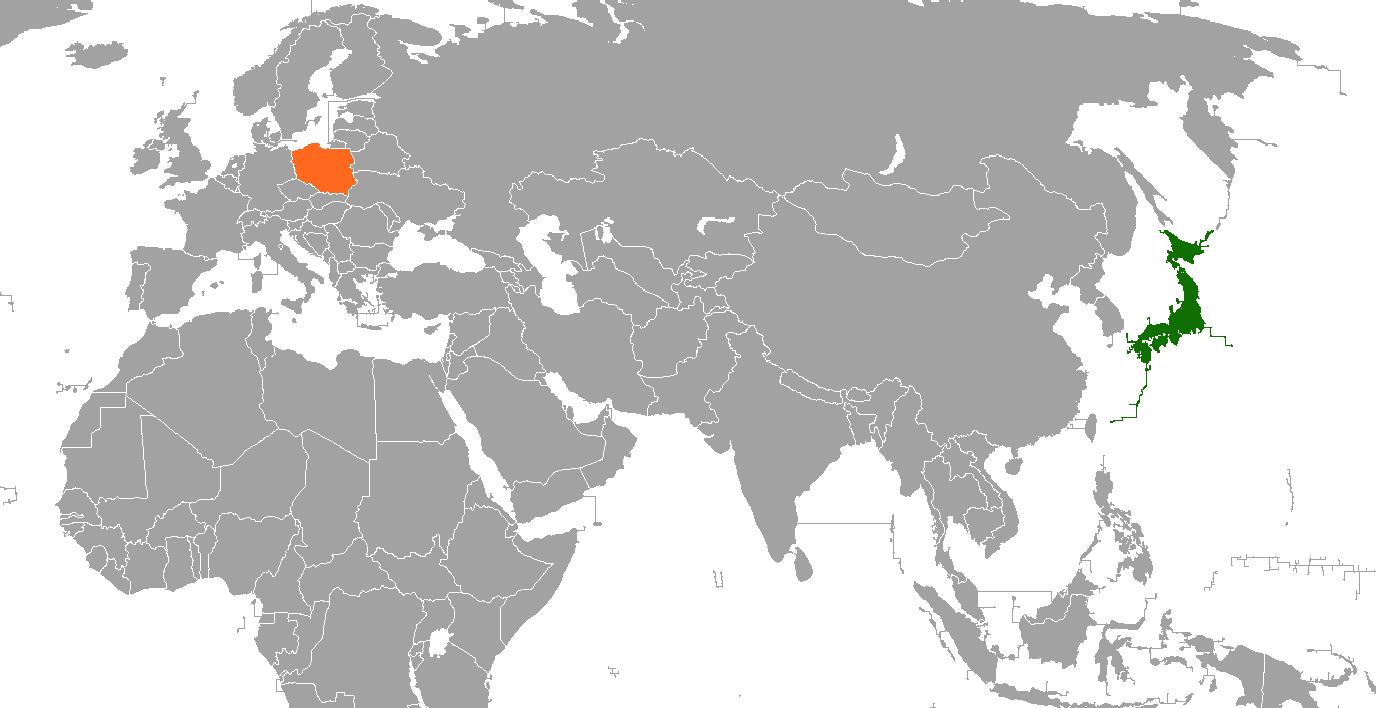
- Japan: Poland

Japan–Poland relations refers to the bilateral foreign relations between Japan and Poland. Both are members of the OECD, World Trade Organization and United Nations.

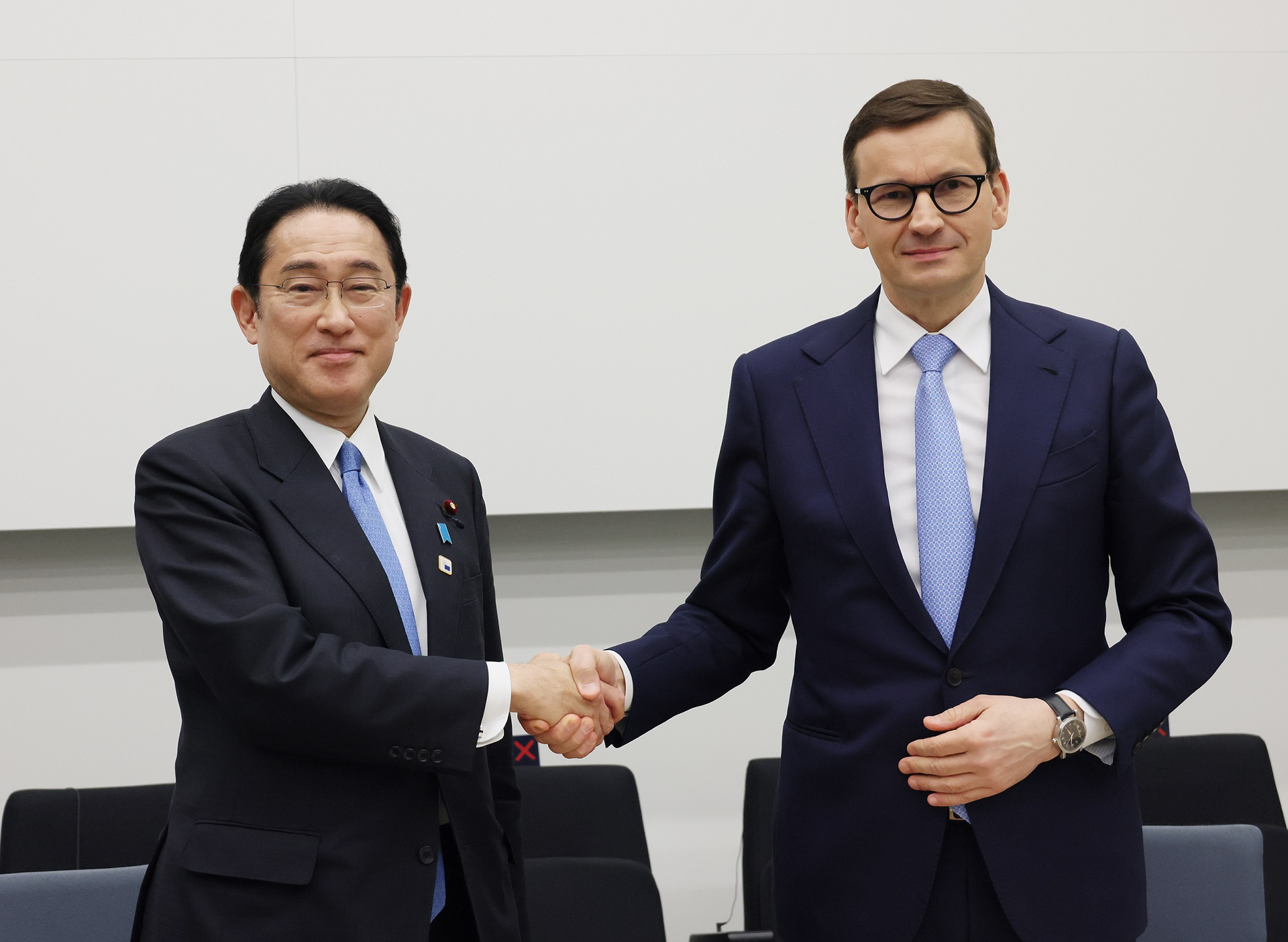
Prime Minister of Japan Fumio Kishida and Prime Minister of Poland Mateusz Morawiecki in Brussels in 2022

== History ==
=== Early history ===
The first non-clergymen Poles to arrive in Japan were the adventurer Maurycy Beniowski and his companion Antoni Straszewski, who arrived in 1771 after escaping from Russian exile in Kamchatka. It was also the first Polish ship to arrive in Japan, as they sailed under the Polish flag aboard a seized Russian galiot. Beniowski's expedition was warmly received by the Japanese, an exchange of gifts took place, and sailing southward, Beniowski stopped at several Japanese islands.

=== 19th and early 20th century ===
Japanese novelist Tokai Sanshi wrote about the Partitions of Poland and the Polish independence movement. The Japanese poem Porando kaiko by Ochiai Naobumi about Fukushima Yasumasa's travels in the 1890s mentions the Polish struggle for freedom.

Polish travelers Karol Lanckoroński and Paweł Sapieha, as well as ethnographers Bronisław Piłsudski and Wacław Sieroszewski, among others, wrote about Japan. Translations of Japanese literature, works on Japanese history and culture were published in partitioned Poland. Japanese culture and art were popularized among Poles by Feliks Jasieński, an enthusiast and collector of Japanese art.

Until World War I, Japanese Taiwan imported many Polish goods, i.e. metal products, leather products, haberdashery and soap from Warsaw, cotton products from Łódź, etc.

During the Russo-Japanese War (1904–1905), General Akashi Motojiro, a Japanese intelligence officer, was tasked with supporting anti-Russian and independence movements in Europe, with the aim of weakening the Russian Empire by supporting anti-Russian movements. In this capacity, he encountered the Polish Socialist Party, which was then seeking broad support for the cause of Polish independence; Motojiro established contact and transferred some funds. Roman Dmowski, a Polish nationalist politician, opposed these actions, arguing that previous experience had shown that the financing of another Polish uprising by a foreign country would not be to Poland's benefit, and that Poland would be treated as an instrument in Japan's great-power ambitions. Dmowski opposed Piłsudski's efforts to secure Japanese support and presented the Japanese government with an alternative political position. Japan under the influence of Dmowski's arguments ultimately declined to support Piłsudski's plans and provided only limited financial assistance. During the war, Poles from the Russian Partition of Poland were conscripted into the Russian Army, and Japanese were among Allied prisoners of war held by the Germans in a POW camp in Stargard in modern northwestern Poland.

=== Interbellum ===
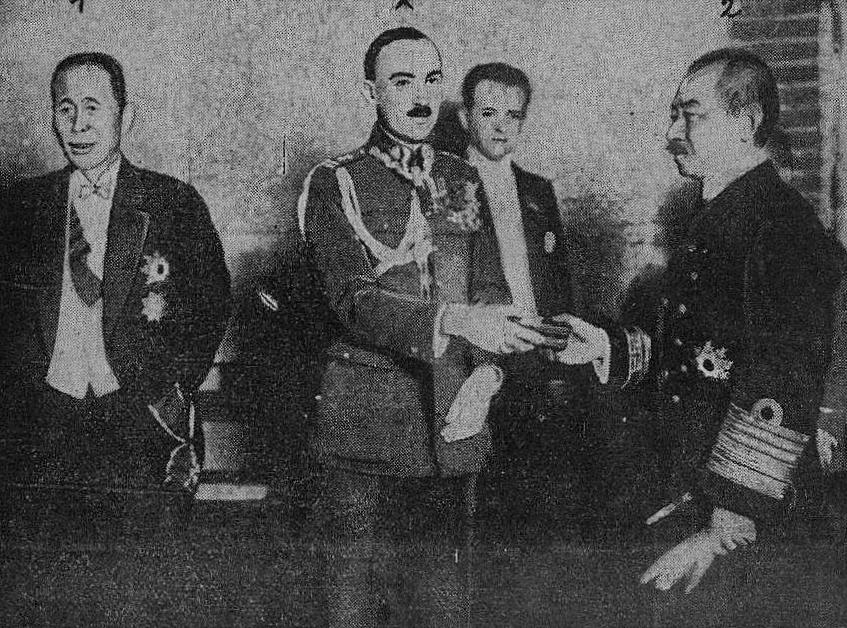
Prime Minister of Japan Tanaka Giichi, Polish lieutenant colonel Wacław Jędrzejewicz and Japanese admiral Okada Keisuke in Poland in 1928

A statue of Polish anthropologist Bronisław Piłsudski (1866–1918), who was a researcher of Ainu culture and married an Ainu woman who was a citizen of Imperial Japan, stands in Japan.

Japan and Poland established diplomatic relations on March 22, 1919, months after Poland regained its independence in November 1918. In the 1920s, a trade treaty was signed. Japanese-Polish societies were formed in each nation, and literature was translated and publications were issued on topics related to the cultures of both countries. By order of Marshal Józef Piłsudski, over 50 Japanese veterans of the Russo-Japanese War were awarded the Virtuti Militari Cross, Poland's highest military decoration. This symbolic gesture stemmed from the fact that Piłsudski was, at the time, seeking support from many countries for Poland's cause for independence, especially countries that had poor relations with the Tsarist Russia.

During Bolshevik rule in Russia, the Japanese Red Cross undertook a rescue operation to help Polish children deported to Siberia. Japanese ships transported Polish children to Tokyo, where the Japanese Red Cross gave them protection and helped them return to Poland. Imperial Japanese Army soldiers deployed in Siberia after the Russian Revolution assisted in the operation. In the end, a total of 765 Polish orphans scattered throughout many Siberian regions were rescued during the period of 1920 to 1922. The orphans were transported by military ships from Vladivostok to the port of the city of Tsuruga in Japan's Fukui Prefecture. They were then cared for in childcare institutions.

The largest Polish community of early 20th-century Japan (including the interbellum) lived in the Karafuto Prefecture, which further grew after 1925, as many Poles fled Soviet Russian persecution in northern Sakhalin. Following the Siberian intervention, Japan supported and subsidized Polish institutions in northern Sakhalin in the early 1920s. Poles in Karafuto engaged in unrestricted social, cultural and economic activities, and a Polish library was established in Toyohara. In 1924, Karafuto was visited by Polish ambassador to Japan Stanisław Patek, and many local Poles were granted Polish citizenship and passports. In 1930, two Catholic churches were built in Toyohara and Odomari, co-funded by Poles from Poland and Karafuto. Only a handful of Poles lived in other parts of Japan. Very few Japanese lived in Poland in the interbellum, including ten in Warsaw and three in Lwów, according to the 1921 Polish census.

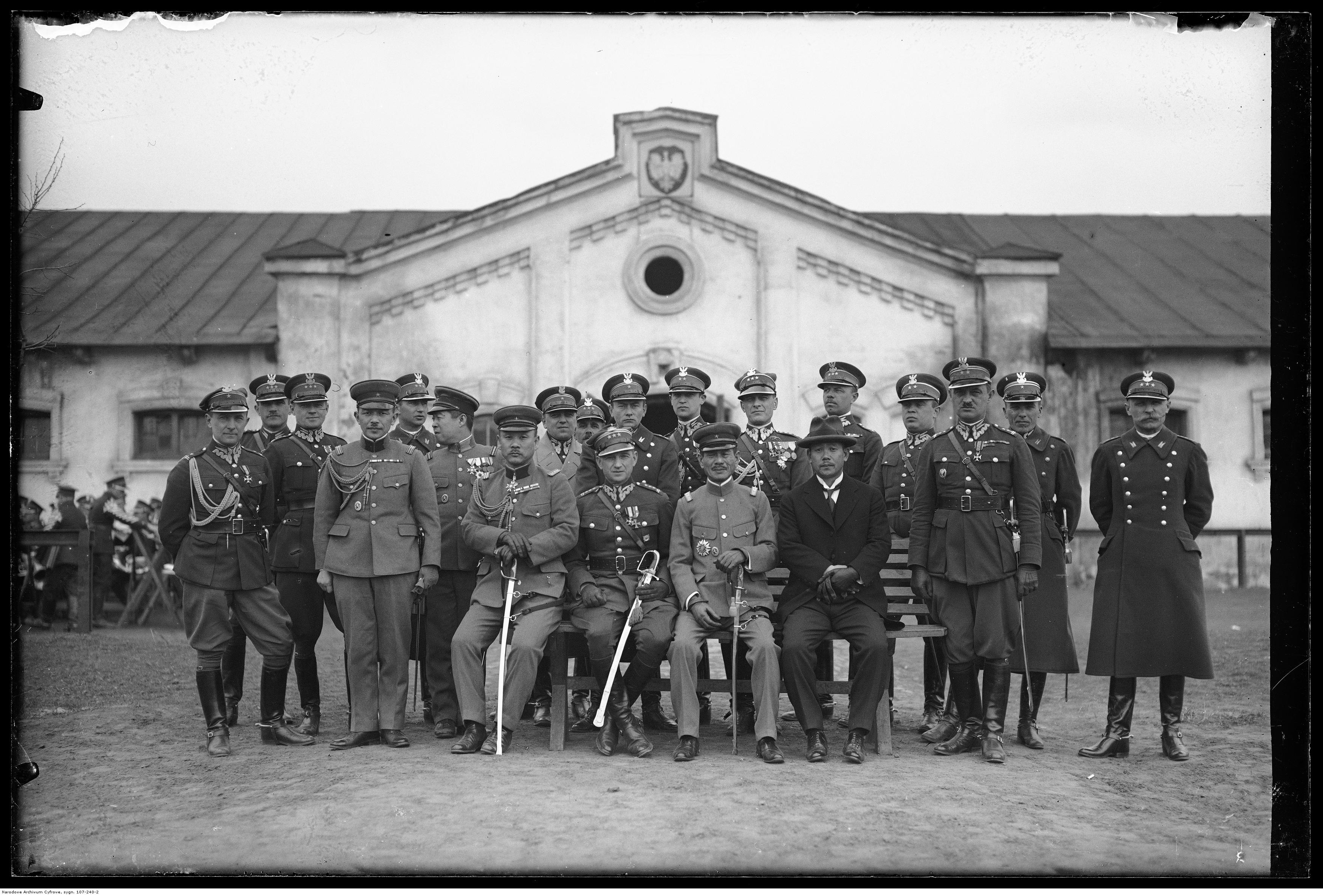
Polish and Japanese military officers in Warsaw in 1929.

In 1930, Polish monks Maksymilian Kolbe and Zeno Żebrowski began their mission in Japan; the latter remained in Japan until his death in 1982, bringing aid to orphans, the elderly, the poor, and the disabled.

Poland and Japan never belonged to the same political bloc, as in many respects they held completely different views and aspirations. Therefore, from the outset, Poland avoided concluding a formal agreement with Japan and maintained significantly limited relations with it. Japanese officer Yamawaki Masataka encountered Polish achievements in breaking Soviet ciphers and proposed to the Japanese military that the Poles teach the Japanese how to crack Russian codes. The Japanese military officials were opposed and skeptical, but ultimately agreed to learn from them. On the other hand, the Poles treated the Japanese with reserve and—guided by pure pragmatism—agreed to an exchange of information regarding the actions of the Soviet Union, which Poles needed anyway, stipulating that such information could concern only that state and must not affect Poland’s relations with other countries and the League of Nations, given that Poland was counting on potential support stemming from French and British influence, which did not align with the Japanese geopolitical perspective. The Pole who taught the Japanese how to break Russian codes was Jan Kowalewski. After gaining trust and building a good reputation in Japan, he was awarded the Order of the Rising Sun, 5th Class. However, when Japan and the USSR concluded the Neutrality Pact, Poland came to the conclusion that further exchange of information with Japan had become pointless and the Sikorski-Mayski Agreement, concluded two months later, further reinforced this conviction among the Polish establishment. For most of the 20th century, Poland and Japan were on opposite sides of the political spectrum; Poland maintained its membership in the League of Nations and friendly relations with its members, while Japan, after leaving the League of Nations in 1933, ultimately found itself at war with them.

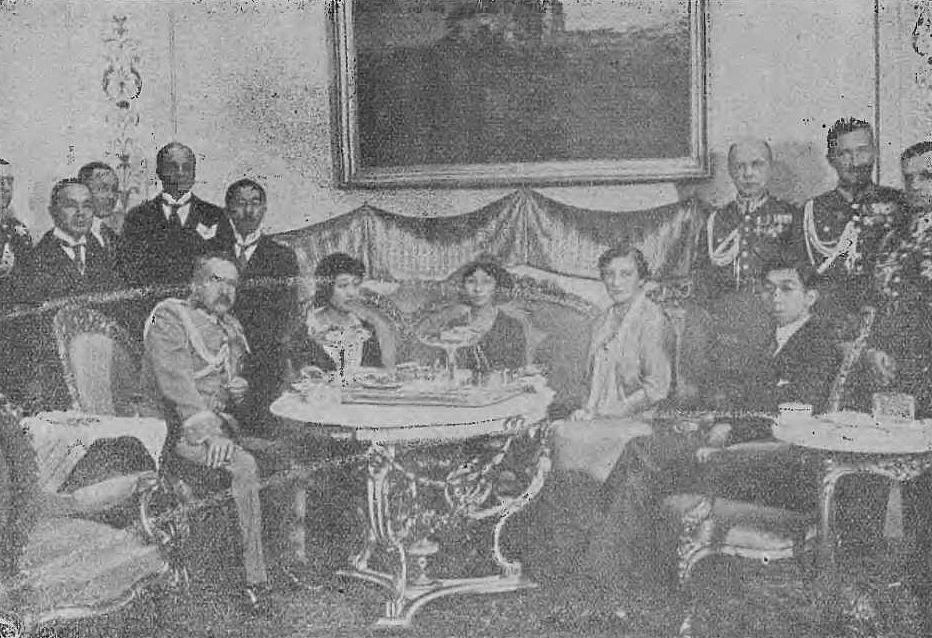
Meeting of Józef Piłsudski and Prince Takamatsu in Warsaw in 1930.

On October 20, 1931, Poland, following the example of other countries, sent a note to the Japanese government regarding their invasion of Manchuria, referencing the Kellogg–Briand Pact. In delivering the note, Antoni Jażdżewski stated: “We hope that the Government of Japan will understand that Poland must behave like other countries.” In May 1932, at the "Polish Inn," members of a special commission of the League of Nations met with representatives of the Polish diaspora in Harbin. The Poles informed the diplomats that the Japanese actions were inconsistent with international law, and their testimony proved to be crucial in the matter, influencing the creation of the Lytton Report and the commission's decision not to recognize Manchukuo and condemn the Japanese aggression. In 1933, Poland, along with other League of Nations member states, officially condemned Japan's actions in Manchuria, confirming that the region should be under Chinese sovereignty. Poland, wanting to maintain good relations with China and the League of Nations, refused to recognize Manchukuo, but at the same time tried to maintain the Polish consulate in Harbin, which existed long before the Japanese occupation, to help Poles who experienced repression from the Japanese and the local authorities of Manchukuo.

After the Japanese invasion, the situation of Poles in Manchuria deteriorated rapidly. The authorities of Manchukuo revoked the extraterritorial rights previously granted by the Chinese to Polish citizens, thereby depriving Poles and Polish institutions of autonomy and rendering their functioning impossible. The Japanese-controlled local authorities confiscated Polish property and concessions, regarding it as a form of punishment for Poland's refusal to recognize Manchukuo. Kazimierz Grochowski, one of the wealthiest Poles in Harbin, was stripped of his assets and concessions by the Japanese occupiers, who told him they had done so because "Poland does not appreciate the importance of Manchukuo". A similar fate befell many other Poles living under Japanese occupation. Examples include, among others, wealthy and entrepreneurial Poles—Władysław Kowalski and Lew Zikman—whose assets were confiscated by the Japanese. Meanwhile, Jerzy Czajewski recalls that his mother's uncle was blackmailed and forced to sell his house to Japanese officers on unfavorable terms. This provided a convenient pretext for confiscating Polish interests in Harbin. The Polish Ministry of Foreign Affairs was powerless in this matter, and negotiations regarding the return of concessions or compensation were ignored, and the Poles' property rights were questioned.

One of the important issues in Polish-Japanese relations during the second half of the 1930s was attempts to bring Poland into the Anti-Comintern Pact. The first proposals were made by Hermann Göring in February 1937, during his stay in Poland. On August 13, 1937, a Japanese-German conference was held in Berlin, where the issue of bringing Poland into the pact was discussed. Among those present was Sawada Shigeru, the then-Japanese attaché in Warsaw. The Polish side, in accordance with Minister Beck's instructions, refused to conclude any serious agreements on the matter with Japan. True to these resolutions, Ambassador Tadeusz Romer made it clear to the Japanese Foreign Minister that Poland would not join any pact, expressing this in the following words: "I have distanced myself quite categorically and unequivocally from any speculation about Poland's participation in any ideological bloc." Shortly thereafter, Minister Beck, at a meeting with Ambassador Sako, reiterated the same view and refused to enter into the pact.

In 1941, the Japanese government finally decided to close the Polish consulate in Harbin. This decision was accelerated by Poland's declaration of war on the Japanese Empire. Furthermore, throughout Manchukuo's existence, Poland officially and formally recognized the Republic of China, along with Chinese rights to Manchuria, maintaining a polish legation to the Chinese government in Chongqing and diplomatic relations with Chiang Kai-shek. This aroused suspicion among the Japanese that an intelligence outpost was operating under the cover of the Polish consulate in Harbin, from which Poles were passing information about the situation in Japanese-occupied Manchuria to the Chinese and other allies. These suspicions were not unfounded, because among the Poles living in Harbin, there were people involved in intelligence activities for the Allies and the Chinese resistance movement. Poland's lack of formal recognition of Manchukuo and its ties to the Chinese government posed a problem for Japan. Consulates in Japanese-occupied regions were suspected of intelligence activities, especially if they represented countries that had not formally recognized Manchukuo.

=== World War II ===
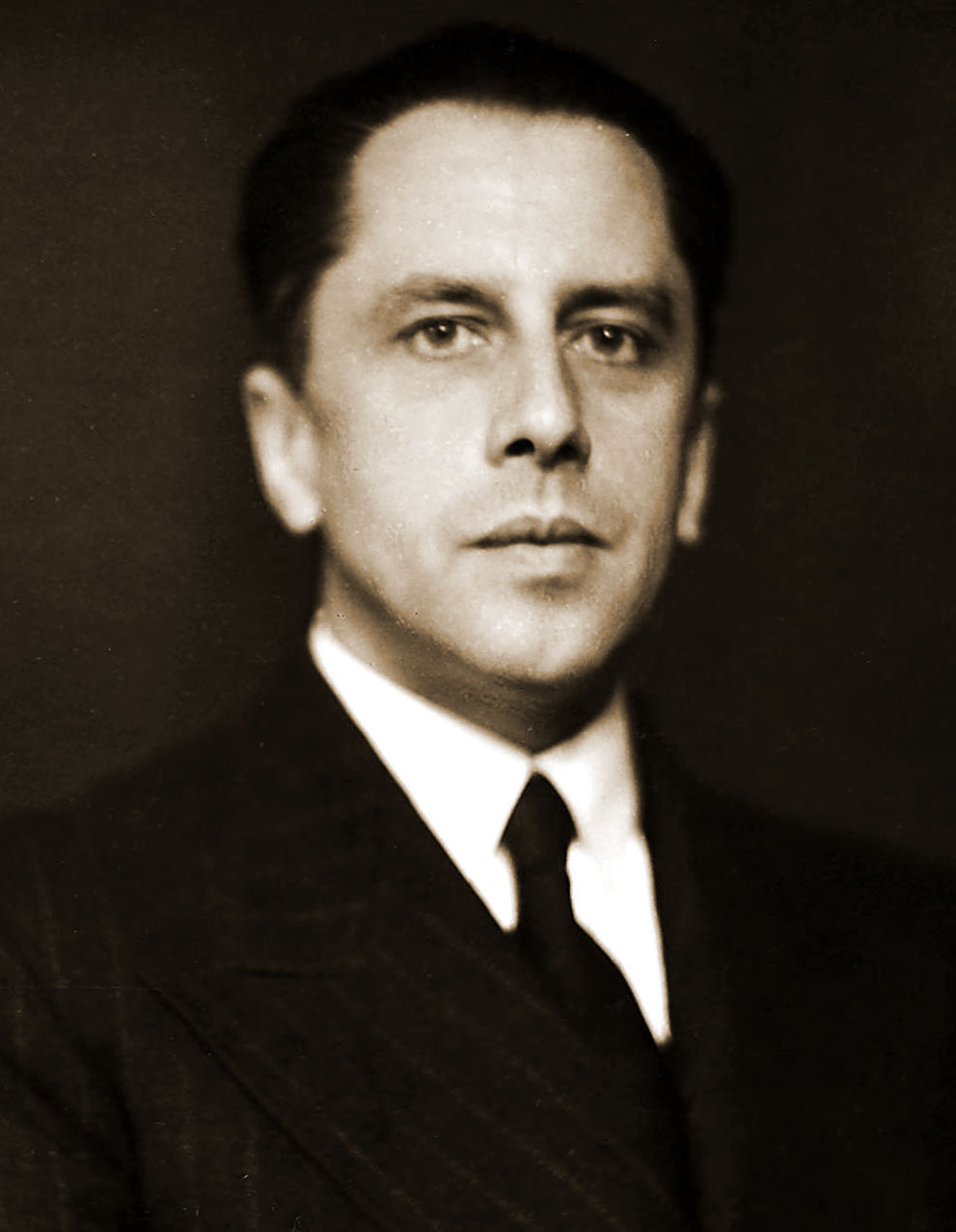
Tadeusz Romer, ambassador of Poland to Japan in 1937–1941

During World War II, political relations between Japan and Poland deteriorated significantly. On October 6 1941, Japan announced the withdrawal of its recognition of the Polish government in exile. On December 11, President Władysław Raczkiewicz and the Council of Ministers, representing the Polish government-in-exile, signed a declaration of war against the Japanese Empire and expressed their official stance on the war in Asia. As a member of the coalition against the Axis powers, Poland wanted to signal which side of the global conflict it stood on. Polish armed forces were not officially sent to fight the Japanese forces because the Poles were busy fighting in Europe, so their ability to support the Americans, British, and Chinese in Asia was limited. However, Polish volunteers in the American forces and members of the Polish diaspora in China also resisted Japanese aggression. Repression by the Japanese also affected Poles in Harbin, initially on an economic basis. However, the situation changed dramatically after the outbreak of World War II, particularly after the Japanese attack on Pearl Harbor and the entry of the United States into the war against the Empire. Among the numerous victims of the occupiers were also Poles, both those living in the city itself and elsewhere. As a result of Japanese persecution in Manchuria, the Polish press and schools were closed down, and businesses owned by Polish citizens were confiscated. Freedom of movement within the country was also banned. Arrests became commonplace, and the attitude of the Poles toward the Japanese occupiers became decidedly negative. All these facts undermine the widely held claim that Japan announced its rejection of the Polish declaration of war; neither the diplomatic documents of the two nations nor any other substantiated sources contain information suggesting that such an event actually took place. In reality, Japan left the Polish declaration unanswered, as any response would have implied that Japan still recognized the existence of the Polish state—which, in turn, would have undermined the territorial gains of its German ally, as well as the very provisions of the Tripartite Pact, under which Japan recognized Germany’s right to establish a new order in Europe—an order in which the Polish state had no right to exist.

Chiune Sugihara was a Japanese diplomat, famous mainly for the help he provided to Poles and several thousand Jews who wanted to escape from the territory of Lithuania after the occupation by the Red Army began on June 15, 1940, and before the formal annexation of Lithuania by the USSR on August 3, 1940 and resulting liquidation of the consulate of the Empire of Japan in Kaunas, where he served as consul. His actions were illegal and inconsistent with the main policy of the Japanese government, and in 1939, counterintelligence informed Göring that Sugihara was so diligent in his intelligence activities that his stay in Königsberg threatened the friendly relations between Germany and Japan. Tadeusz Romer, ambassador of Poland in Japan, helped the Polish-Jewish refugees after they arrived in Japan.

=== Modern relations ===
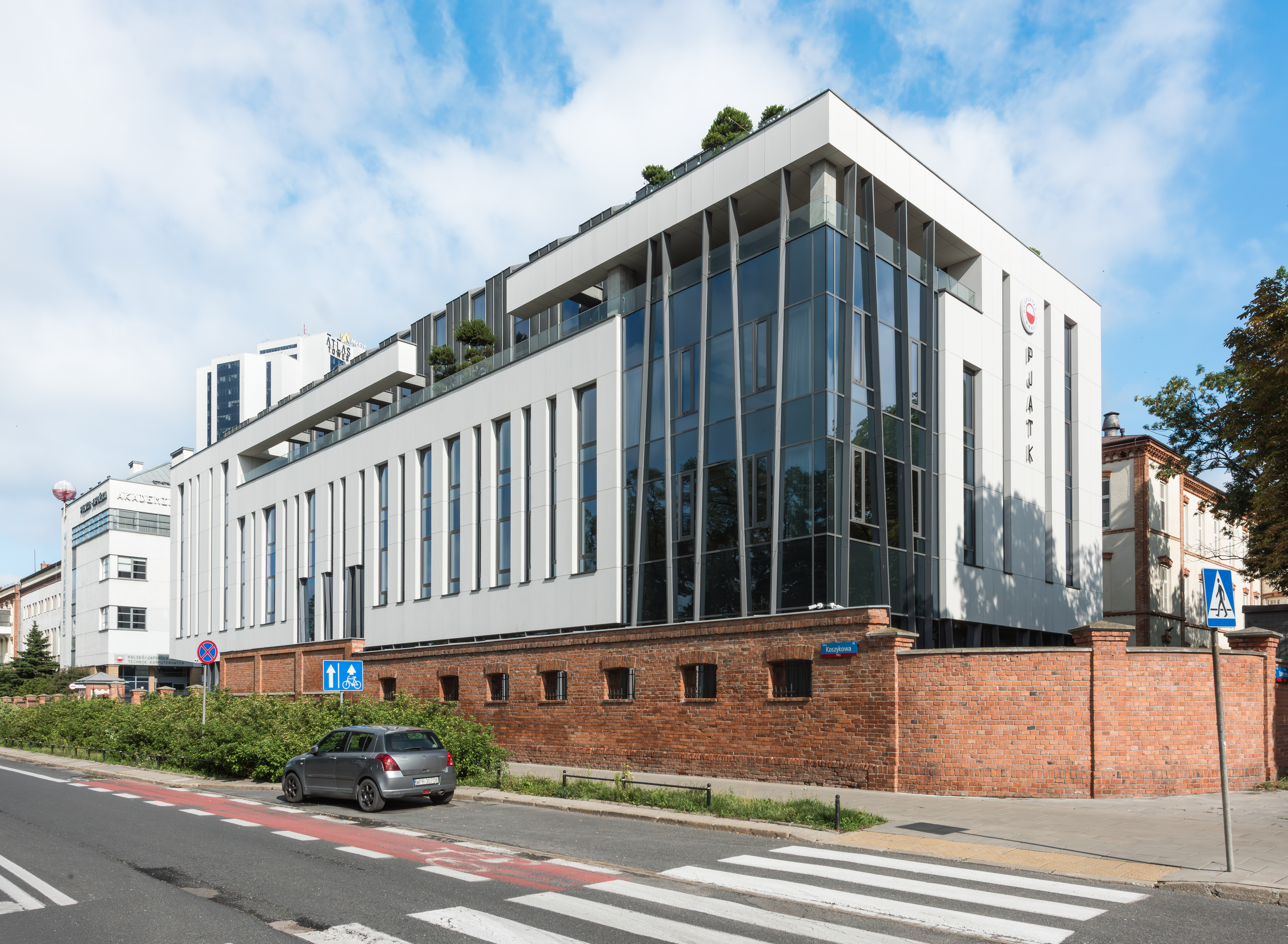
Polish-Japanese Academy of Information Technology in Warsaw, Poland

Following the Soviet–Japanese Joint Declaration of 1956, relations improved between Japan and Poland. In 1957, they signed an agreement on the normalization of relations, ending the technical state of war between the nations. A double tax avoidance agreement was signed between the two countries in Tokyo in 1980.

Since 1990, the number of official visits by top government officials to both countries has increased. In 1994, the Polish-Japanese Academy of Information Technology in Warsaw was established. In 2011, the Polish Institute in Tokyo was founded.

In 1995, Poland had the chance to repay Japan for the rescue of Polish orphans from Siberia in the early 1920s by sheltering Japanese children impacted by the 1995 Great Hanshin earthquake. The children, many from Kobe and nearby areas of western Japan, went to Poland and stayed from 1995 to 1996, while the chaos and loss caused by the earthquake were sorted out. Poland repeated this gesture after the Great East Japan Earthquake in 2011. On November 20, 2018, a school in the suburbs of Warsaw was named after the Japanese Army operations that rescued Polish orphans: “Siberia Orphans Commemoration Elementary School.”

The two states celebrated 90 years of relationship in 2009 and the 100th anniversary in 2019. Trade, business, and tourism between both countries continues to thrive. LOT Polish Airlines provides daily non-stop flights between Tokyo and Warsaw. Both countries are full members of the OECD, but modern relations are limited to mostly trade and cultural activities, although both countries see each other as vital partners in global commerce. In 2017, Japan became the second largest foreign investor in Poland in terms of total investment value, only behind the United States.

For short stays, Japanese nationals do not require visas to enter Poland, and Polish nationals do not require visas to enter Japan.

== Culture ==
In Poland, there is a museum devoted to Japanese art and technology – the Manggha in Kraków. Several other museums also possess collections of Japanese art and artifacts, including the National Museum in Warsaw, District Museum in Toruń and National Museum in Szczecin. In Tokyo, there is a Polish Institute.

Japanese cultural exports to Poland, including anime, video games, music and food have made a significant impact on young Poles. Additionally, Japanese is taught in many Polish schools.

== Embassies and consulates ==
- Poland has an embassy in Tokyo, and honorary consulates in Kobe and Hiroshima.
- Japan has an embassy in Warsaw, and an honorary consulate in Kraków.
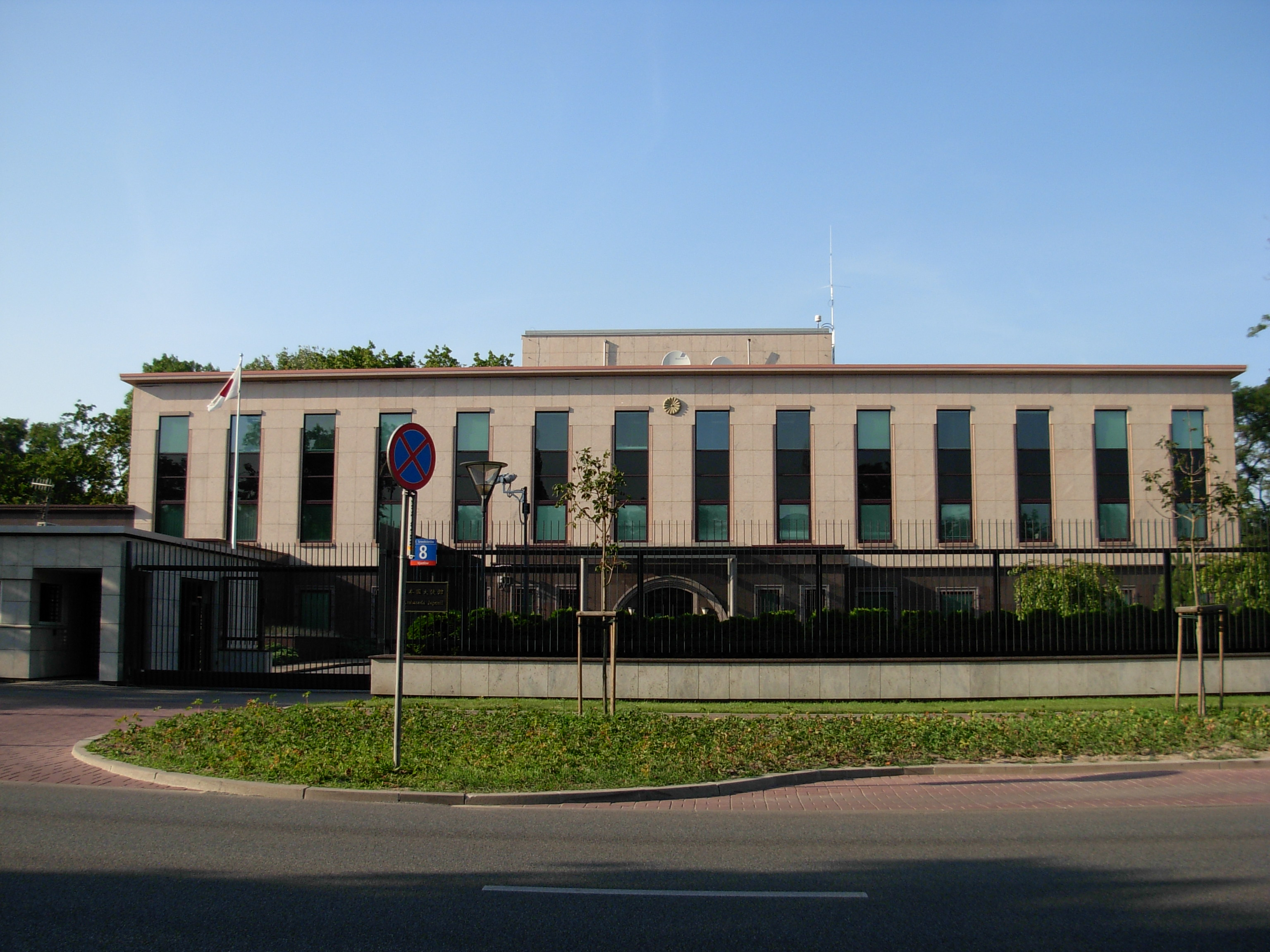
Embassy of Japan in Warsaw

Embassy of Poland in Tokyo

== See also ==
- Foreign relations of Japan
- Foreign relations of Poland
- Poles in Japan
