= Japan–Montenegro relations =

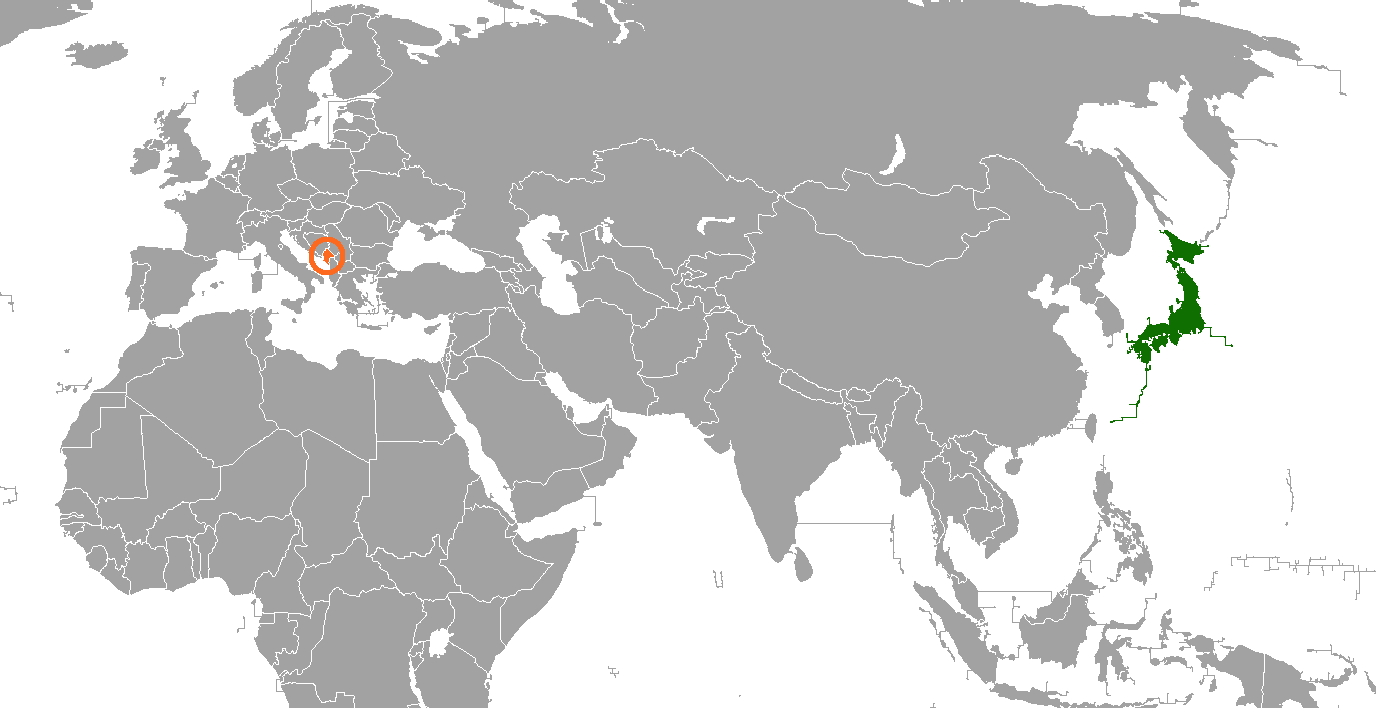

- Japan: Montenegro

Japan recognised Montenegro on 16 June 2006, stating then that "the policy of the Government of Japan [is] to attach importance to the peace and stability of Western Balkans countries including Montenegro". Neither country has a resident ambassador. Japan has a non resident ambassador in Belgrade.

== History ==
During the Russo-Japanese War, volunteers from Montenegro were encouraged to fight in the Russian Army in Manchuria. However, Montenegro was not mentioned in the 1905 peace treaty and a technical state of war was presumed to exist between the two countries. In 2006, Japan made the gesture of recognising Montenegrin independence following its secession from Serbia and declared then that hostilities were over. However, a 2025 study challenges the concept of this extended war, describing it as a myth generated for political and ideological purposes rather than a juridical reality.

== Recent developments ==
Montenegro has an honorary consulate in Tokyo, but there is no resident Japanese representative in Montenegro. However, the country has been recipient of Japanese development aid, and in 2017 the Japanese ambassador to Serbia visited the Montenegrin Prime Minister.

Montenegro has minor trade relations with Japan. In 2017 it imported goods worth €19 million from there and exported €2 million worth. According to the Japanese Foreign Ministry, there was a very small community of 27 Japanese nationals in Montenegro in 2017.

In 2016, Montenegro expelled 58 foreigners (of whom only four were Japanese) linked to the doomsday cult Aum Shinrikyo, which was behind the 1995 Tokyo subway sarin attack. A police statement said they had "received information from [Japanese] partner security services showing that a group of foreign nationals, who were numbers of a closed religious group, were staying in Montenegro".

== See also ==
- Foreign relations of Japan
- Foreign relations of Montenegro
- Japan–Yugoslavia relations
