= Satoko Kitahara =

Japanese Catholic social worker (1929–1958)

Venerable Satoko Kitahara
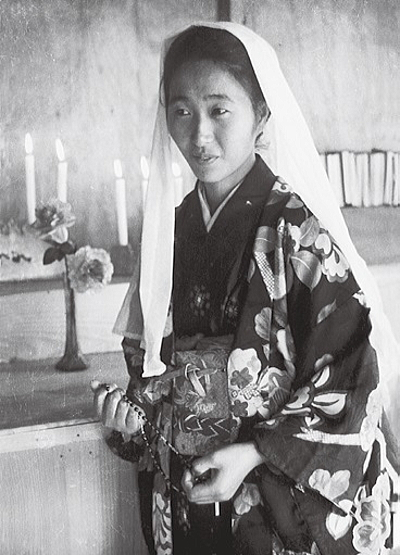
- Born: 22 August 1929; Tokyo, Empire of Japan
- Died: 23 January 1958 (aged 28); Tokyo

Satoko Kitahara (北原 怜子, Kitahara Satoko; 22 August 1929 – 23 January 1958) – later known as Elisabeth Maria Kitahara – was a Japanese Roman Catholic. Kitahara was descended from aristocrats and samurai warriors; she worked in an airplane warehouse during World War II and became disillusioned after she and others learnt of Japanese atrocities during the conflict. She discovered Roman Catholicism and after a period of being exposed to churches decided to learn catechism so she could be baptized.

Upon her baptism she selected the name Elisabeth and upon her Confirmation added the name "Maria". Kitahara made it her goal to tend to the impoverished and orphaned as well as the sick and poor who were suffering as a result of the damage inflicted during the war. In 1950 she first met the Conventual Franciscan friar Zenon Żebrowski and the two worked together to care for destitute people and children in the riverside Ants Village. This work became the focus for Kitahara's life until she died from tuberculosis in 1958.

The beatification process had been proposed since the 1970s and had opened in 1981 which made Kitahara known as a Servant of God. In 2015 she was named as venerable after Pope Francis confirmed her life of heroic virtue.

== Life ==
=== Childhood and war ===
Satoko Kitahara was born in Tokyo on 22 August 1929 as one of five children (four girls and one boy). Kitahara was descended from samurai warriors and was raised in a Shintō household (she was also descended from Shintō priests).

The Kitahara's supported the Japanese war effort during World War II with both her father and brother-in-law being sent to fight. Her older brother was summoned to work in the Nakajima Airplane Warehouse which prompted Kitahara to join him there during the course of the war. Her time there was interrupted with frequent warning sirens due to continuous bombings and she even survived a U.S. bombing of the plant (sending her into deep shock) but contracted tuberculosis as a result of the attack. Her brother succumbed from pneumonia not long following this. In the warehouse she became appalled with the unchaste behavior of some of her colleagues and soon became disillusioned after reports of Japanese atrocities during the war were made public. Over time she came to believe that the Shintō religion provided nothing for her.

=== First exposure to Catholicism ===
Kitahara developed an admiration for the work of Doctor Albert Schweitzer around this point and commenced her college education once the war ended. In March 1948, while a pharmaceutical student in the department of medicine at the Showa Women's College, she and a classmate took a stroll one afternoon in Yokohama. The pair asked themselves about the meaning of life which Kitahara came to question following a series of life events. One such event was avoiding death after a bus almost ran her over in 1935. Two siblings had died from illness in the war and she gave up her idea of becoming a concert pianist to turn towards medicine. Kitahara would often pass churches and felt compelled to look inside but was frightened and nervous to do so. But this March afternoon was when she and her friend noticed a man going into the church of the Sacred Heart which enticed the pair to follow him inside. Inside she was spellbound upon seeing a Marian statue (she did not know who it depicted) while in 1950 writing that she became overwhelmed with an "indefinable emotion". In the next few months she made a series of visits to more churches.

It was not long prior to her graduation that - in March 1949 - she encountered a student who expressed happiness to the point where Kitahara inquired as to their cause of this. The student said that she began attending the same church that Kitahara had gone into back in 1948. Kitahara obtained her diploma in 1949 upon her graduation. Her father did not share her interest in Roman Catholicism but wanted his granddaughter (her niece) Choko to receive a good education. To that end he sent Choko to a school that the Mercedarian Sisters (who hailed from Spain) managed. Kitahara encountered the order when she accompanied Choko to the school and was awestruck upon seeing a Japanese nun wearing the Mercedarian habit. Sometime later Choko began attending Mass in the convent school and the Mother Superior invited Kitahara to attend upon seeing her with Choko.

Over time she became an obsessive cinema fan and went to the movie theatre as often as six times a week.

=== Baptism ===
It was not long until the nuns were proving her with catechetical lessons and she began to attend morning Mass in the convent's chapel each 6:00am. Her father meanwhile had resolved never to oppose the aspirations of his children but disagreed with his daughter's approach to faith and decided to exchange ideas at dinner hoping to dissuade her. He urged her to recognize that the advance of science made religion obsolete while she countered that miracles defied science in several reported cases which empowered the need for faith and reason. Kitahara converted to the faith and received baptism on 30 October 1949 from Father Albert Bold (of the Divine Word Missionaries) in which she assumed the name "Elisabeth". Bold went through the list of saint names to see which one she would like to take. He came across that of Saint Elizabeth and told her of her service to the poor. Kitahara became excited and said with resolve: "I am taking that name. I am taking that name". Upon her baptism Bold gave her a rosary which Pope Pius XII had blessed. Her older sister Kazuko heard her mention that baptism made her "the bride of the Lord" and so volunteered to sew a white wedding gown. This gown became a visible pledge to consecrate herself to God. Kitahara assumed the name "Maria" upon her Confirmation and again wore her wedding gown.

It was not long until she harbored dreams of becoming a Mercedarian nun herself. To that end she arranged to have one of the nuns teach her the Spanish language (a requirement). Her dreams would soon be realized to the point she packed a black dress (in preparation for becoming a postulant) and tucked a train ticket beneath her pillow. But the dream became shattered before she left after developing a high fever in which a doctor would diagnose her with tuberculosis. The Mercedarians could not receive a new postulant in poor health which saddened Kitahara and made her unsure of what God's plan for her was to be.

=== Meeting Żebrowski ===
In November 1950 - while helping her mother with household chores - she heard the store assistant from her older sister's shoe store call to her to meet a visitor. The visitor in question was the Polish Conventual Franciscan friar Zeno Żebrowski (1891-1982) whom the assistant believed was a priest (but was incorrect in that). Żebrowski had come to Japan in 1930 with Saint Maximilian Maria Kolbe in order to evangelize. The assistant told the friar that the store owner's sister was a Christian which interested the friar. His gaze upon her entrance became fixed to the rosary dangling off the sash of her kimono. He asked in Japanese if she was baptized to which she said that "I was baptized at the convent of the Mercedarians". He was pleased with this and startled Kitahara when he asked if she ever wanted to become a nun. This startled her because it was an innermost thought but nevertheless replied that she was interested in that path. Żebrowski assured her that the Blessed Mother would guide her and before leaving gave her a pamphlet on the late Kolbe.

The assistant came to her home later that evening with the newspaper regarding the friar and some riverbank settlement of impoverished and homeless people known as Ants Town (Arinomachi). Kitahara wanted to help the children there but did not know how to contact the friar. That 1 December she was closing the shutters for the night when she noticed a robed figure running through the rain without an umbrella and realized that it was Żebrowski. Kitahara ran after him - also without an umbrella - and wandered the streets to look for him. He greeted her when she found him and he would soon introduce her to the Ants Town and the work involved with it.

=== Ants Town ===
Prior to Christmas in 1950 the friar came to visit her with Matsui Toru who was one of the unofficial leaders of the settlement. Toru asked her to help entertain the children, for which she used her pianist abilities to both instruct and entertain them. Toru and Kitahara worked together. Toru was later baptized into the faith in 1953.

Both she and Żebrowski collaborated to minister to the ill, the displaced, and the orphaned. Kitahara dedicated herself to alleviating the suffering of those whom the war had victimized. But she realized that she would be able to better help them if she became like them. To that end she renounced her wealth and status to live with the homeless and the outcast. Kitahara also resorted to rag-picking. It was not long until she led children in rag-picking expeditions and one of the participating adults was her own mother. In the beginning of 1951 she became a member of the Militia Immaculatae. Her dedication to the children was strong and her commitment to the Ants Town grew stronger with each person she was able to aid.

=== Illness and death ===
Kitahara died at 7:00am on 23 January 1958 due to tuberculosis. She was buried in a plot at Tama. Her mother entered the Church in 1962.

== Beatification process ==
From 1972 the beatification process had been called for with the Conventual Franciscans also taking an interest in the cause being opened. The order wanted to promote Kitahara's life and lobbied for her cause to Archbishop (later cardinal) Peter Seiichii who launched an initial investigation. The cause's launch came under Pope John Paul II on 26 January 1981 after the Congregation for the Causes of Saints declared Kitahara as a Servant of God and declared the nihil obstat ("no objections"). The cognitional process of investigation was launched in 1981 and closed in 1983 before the Congregation validated the investigation in Rome on 5 October 1984.

The postulation later drafted the positio which documented Kitahara's life and virtues and which was published on 14 August 1997. TPope Francis confirmed that Kitahara lived a model Christian life of heroic virtue on 22 January 2015 and named Kitahara as venerable. The postulator for the cause is the Damian-Gheorge Pătraşcu OFMConv.
