= List of wars extended by diplomatic irregularity =

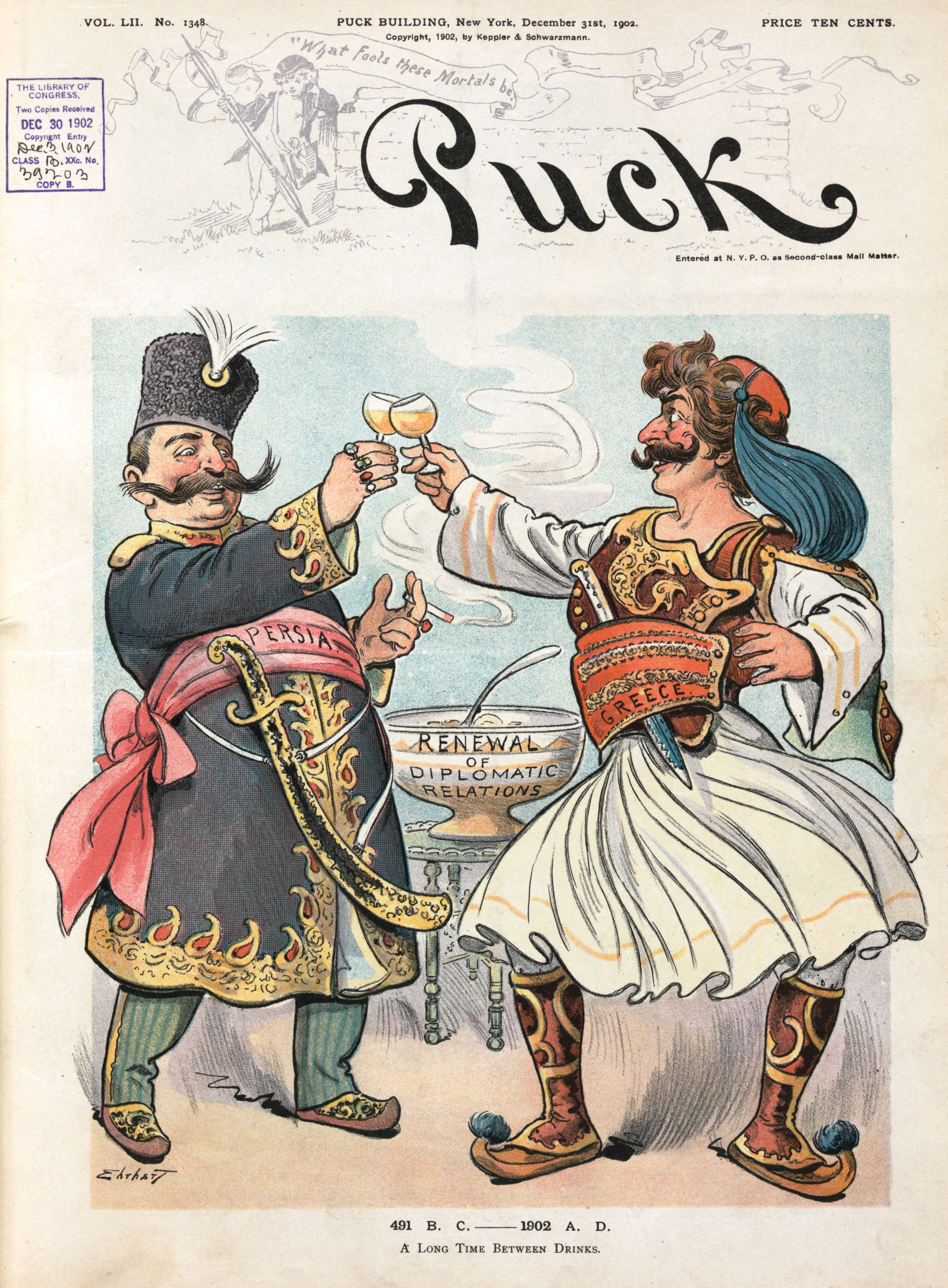
Cartoon by Puck magazine celebrating the "resumption" of diplomatic relations between Greece and Persia in 1902, interrupted after the outbreak of the Greco-Persian Wars in 490 BC

There are different claims of wars extended by diplomatic irregularity which involve long peaceful periods after the end of hostilities where, for various reasons, the belligerents could be considered to be in a technical state of war. For example, occasionally small countries named in a declaration of war would accidentally be omitted from a peace treaty ending the wider conflict.

Such "extended wars" are discovered much after the fact, and have no impact during the long period (often hundreds of years) after the actual fighting ended. The discovery of an "extended war" is sometimes an opportunity for a friendly ceremonial peace to be contracted by the belligerent parties. Such peace ceremonies are even conducted after ancient wars where no peace treaty was expected in the first place, and in cases where the countries were not even at war at all. These "treaties" often involve non-sovereign sub-national entities, such as cities, who do not in reality have the power to declare or end wars.

Related situations (not necessarily listed below) include:

- Frozen conflicts, where an armistice (ceasefire) is signed or fighting comes to an end, but there is intentionally no peace treaty because the underlying political conflict has not been resolved.
- A state of war that ends without a peace treaty when the original declaration of war was deemed to be illegal, such as the declaration of war by Thailand against the United States was mutually recognized to be after World War II.
- Political conflicts that continue after the signing of a peace treaty that formally ends the state of war. For example, the Soviet–Japanese Joint Declaration of 1956 ended the state of war between Japan and the Soviet Union that was declared during World War II, but the Kuril Islands dispute remains an unresolved consequence of the war.

== Extended wars ==
Combatants	Historical conflict	Period of de facto conflict (Note: Period between declaration of war and de facto peace)	De jure peace	De facto duration, years	De jure duration, years	De facto – de jure difference, years	Status of claim
Isles of Scilly vs Dutch Republic	First Anglo-Dutch War (Three Hundred and Thirty Five Years' War)	1651–1654	1986	4	335	331	The Dutch Republic under Maarten Tromp declared war solely on the Isles of Scilly, as the final stronghold of the Royalist naval force which was capturing Dutch merchant ships. When the Dutch and the Commonwealth of England signed the Treaty of Westminster (1654), this separate state of war was not mentioned and thus not included in the peace. The Dutch ambassador, visiting in April 1986 to conclude peace, joked that it must have been harrowing to the Scillonians "to know we could have attacked at any moment."
Huéscar vs Denmark	Peninsular War	1809–1814	1981	6	172	167	The Spanish town of Huéscar declared war on Denmark, as a result of the Napoleonic wars over Spain, where Denmark supported the French Empire. The official declaration of war was forgotten until it was discovered by a local historian in 1981, followed by the signing of a peace treaty on 11 November 1981 by the city mayor and the Ambassador of Denmark. Not a single shot was fired during the 172 years of war, and nobody was killed or injured.
Montenegro vs Japan	Russo-Japanese War	1904–1905	2006	2	102	101	Montenegro declared war in support of Russia but Montenegro lacked a navy or any other means to engage Japan. When the Russians and Japanese signed the Treaty of Portsmouth, Montenegro was not mentioned and thus not included in the peace. After Montenegro (independent in 1904, but united with Serbia by 1918) had voted in 2006 to resume its independence, it concluded a separate peace treaty in order to establish diplomatic relations with Japan. See Japan–Montenegro relations.
Costa Rica vs Germany	World War I	1918	1945	1	28	27	Due to a dispute over the legitimacy of the government of Federico Tinoco Granados, Costa Rica was not a party to the Treaty of Versailles and did not unilaterally end the state of war. The technical state of war ended after World War II only after they were included in the Potsdam Agreement. Costa Rica did not issue a declaration of war against Germany in World War II.
Soviet Union vs Japan	Soviet–Japanese War (Part of World War II)	1945	1956	1	11	10	The Soviet–Japanese War was a short conflict that lasted less than a month in 1945. However, despite this, the Soviets refused to sign the Treaty of San Francisco and did not unilaterally end the state of war. Ultimately, the state of war was not formally ended until the Soviet–Japanese Joint Declaration of 1956, 11 years later.
Poland vs Japan	World War II	1941–1945	1957	4	16	12	In December 1941, the Polish government-in-exile unilaterally declared war on Japan. However, as Soviet-occupied Poland refused to sign the Treaty of San Francisco, the country also did not unilaterally end the state of war. Ultimately, the state of war was not formally ended until 1957, when Japan concluded a separate peace treaty in order to establish diplomatic relations with the Polish People's Republic. (Note: The Polish government-in-exile never recognized the peace treaty and remained in a technical state of war with Japan until it disbanded in 1991, following the fall of communism in Poland.) See Japan–Poland relations.
Greece vs Albania	Greco-Italian War (Part of World War II)	1940–1941	Ongoing	1	86	85	Greece and Albania are still de jure at war. The Greek parliament has never officially abolished the law of war enacted in 1940. Despite a 1987 decision to repeal it, ratification is pending.
UN Forces (led by United States) vs Iraq	Gulf War	1991	2003	1	13	12	The UN resolution which ended the first Gulf War only enacted a ceasefire. It did not end the state of war with Iraq. The British Government would, 12 years later, use the de jure state of war with Iraq to provide the legal basis for the 2003 invasion of Iraq. Opponents of the Iraq War have criticised this interpretation, with one source labelling it as "legal gymnastics" (see Legality of the Iraq War).

== Symbolic peace agreements ==
Combatants	Historical conflict	Period of de facto conflict (Note: Period between declaration of war and de facto peace)	De jure peace	De facto duration	De jure duration	De facto – de jure difference	Status of claim
Rome vs Carthage	Third Punic War	149–146 BC	1985	4	2134	2130	Ancient Rome and Ancient Carthage never signed a peace treaty after the Romans seized and completely destroyed the city of Carthage in 146 BC and enslaved its entire surviving population, leaving no entity with which to make peace. A new city Roman Carthage was founded as a colony of Rome. In 1985 the mayors of modern Rome and Carthage municipality signed a peace treaty and accompanying pact of friendship.
Sparta vs Athens	Peloponnesian War	431–404 BC	1996	28	2427	2399	The mayors of modern-day Athens and Sparta signed a symbolic agreement to end the war in 1996. By then, the two cities had been part of modern-day Greece for over a century.
Greece vs Persia	Greco-Persian Wars	499 BC	1902	50	2403	2353	Greece and Persia may or not have formed a peace treaty in antiquity but if they did, neither nation knew of it when Greece re-appeared on the map.
Berwick-upon-Tweed vs Russia	Crimean War	1853–1856	1966	4	114	110	Local custom in the town of Berwick-upon-Tweed states that when the United Kingdom declared war on the Russian Empire that the town was included by name in the declaration of war (because of uncertainty as to whether it belonged to England or Scotland), but was left out of the peace treaty. Although research concluded that the town had not in fact been mentioned in either, a peace treaty was nonetheless allegedly signed between Robert Knox and an unnamed Soviet official. However, Jim Herbert of the Berwick Borough Museum said in 2006 that contemporary newspaper reports did not confirm that a treaty had been signed, nor could Knox's remark to the Soviet official who was said to have attended the signing, "Tell the Russians they can sleep easy in their beds", be verified.

== See also ==
- List of conflicts by duration
- List of ongoing armed conflicts
