= Embassy of Poland, Tokyo =

Diplomatic mission of Poland to Japan

Coordinates: 35°38′22″N 139°42′31″E

Embassy of the Republic of Poland in Tokyo Ambasada Rzeczypospolitej Polskiej w Tokio 駐日ポーランド共和国大使館 Chū-Nichi Pōrando-kyōwakoku Taishikan
- Address: 2-13-5 Mita, Meguro-ku, Tokyo
- Ambassador: Paweł Milewski (since 2019)

The Embassy of Poland in Tokyo is the main diplomatic mission representing Poland in Japan.

== History ==
Japan and Poland first established diplomatic relations in 1919, shortly following the establishment of the Second Polish Republic, which was the first Polish sovereign state after centuries of partitions. Amidst the context of the Polish diplomatic service being rebuilt in a difficult and corrupt environment, there was some difficulty with appointing the first envoy for the planned Polish legation. In 1920, Józef Targowski, then envoy to Siberia, was designated minister plenipotentiary to Japan. Although he had earlier suggested the establishment of such a post to complement his activities, he was rather surprised to learn of his appointment, which was not helped by the fact that he had been notified about it two weeks after all other involved parties. Despite wondering about the broadness of the territory he now had jurisdiction over, he went to Japan to fulfill his duties.

In 1937, the legation was upgraded to an embassy, with Tadeusz Romer, the newly appointed envoy, becoming the first ambassador of Poland to Japan. However, the outbreak of World War II brought a number of challenges to the mission. Despite German pressure, the embassy was able to stay open for some time, and Romer used it to take care of Polish refugees in Japan and facilitate travel to safer countries. Finally, the embassy had to close in 1941.

After the declaration of martial law in Poland in 1981, Ambassador Zdzisław Rurarz escaped from the embassy and successfully sought asylum in the United States, citing the use of military force against civilians as the reason for his defection. In 1995, a competition was held to design what wound become the current complex, with Ingarden & Ewý Architects winning. They used a design that aimed to balance the restraints of Japanese architectural laws and safety concerns as well as beauty, uniqueness and open spaces, with the new embassy opening on 30 May 2001.

During the 2020 Olympic Games held in 2021, Ambassador Paweł Milewski helped Belarusian-Polish sprinter Krystsina Tsimanouskaya’s defect after she refused to return home.

== Embassy sections ==
- Office of Politics and Economics
  - Department of Consular Affairs
- Office of Commerce and Investment
- Office of Finance and Administration
- Defense Attaché
- Polish Institute in Japan
- Foreign Office of the Polish Tourism Organization in Tokyo

== Honorary consulates of Poland in Japan ==
There are two Polish Honorary Consulates in Japan one in Kobe and one in Hiroshima.

== See also ==
- Embassy of Japan, Warsaw
