= Three Hundred and Thirty Five Years' War =

1651–1986 alleged state of war

Isles of Scilly Netherlands

The Three Hundred and Thirty-Five Years' War (Dutch: Driehonderdvijfendertigjarige Oorlog [driˌɦɔndərtˌfɛifɛnˌdɛrtəxˈjaːrəɣə ˈʔoːrlɔx]; Cornish: Bell a dri hans pymthek warn ugens) was an alleged state of war between the Netherlands and the Isles of Scilly (located off the southwest coast of Great Britain). It is said to have been extended by the lack of a peace treaty for 335 years without a single shot being fired, which would make it one of the world's longest wars, and a bloodless war. Despite the uncertain validity of the declaration of war, and thus uncertainty about whether or not a state of war ever actually existed, peace was finally declared in 1986, bringing an end to any hypothetical war that may have been legally considered to exist.

== War ==
=== Origins ===
The origins of the war can be found in the English Civil War, fought between the Royalists and Parliamentarians from 1642 to 1651. Oliver Cromwell had fought the Royalists to the edges of the Kingdom of England. In the west of Britain, this meant that Cornwall was the last Royalist stronghold. In 1648, Cromwell pushed on until mainland Cornwall was in the hands of the Parliamentarians. The Royalist navy was forced to retreat to the Isles of Scilly, which lay off the Cornish coast and were under the ownership of Royalist John Granville.

=== Dutch navy alliance ===
The navy of the United Provinces of the Netherlands was at the time allied with the Parliamentarians. The Netherlands had been assisted by the English under a number of rulers in the Eighty Years' War (1568–1648), starting with Queen Elizabeth I. The Treaty of Münster (30 January 1648) had confirmed Dutch independence from Spain. The Netherlands sought to maintain their alliance with England and had chosen to ally with the Parliamentarians. The Dutch saw the Parliamentarians as the side likely to win the Civil War. In addition, the Regent class of the Dutch Republic, and thus the majority in the States of Holland, was politically sympathetic to the Parliamentarian side, and the de facto national church, the Calvinist Dutch Reformed Church, also approved of the Parliamentarians' religious positions and policies.

The Dutch merchant navy was suffering heavy losses from the Royalist fleet based in Scilly. On 30 March 1651( Julian Calendar ), Lieutenant-Admiral Maarten Harpertszoon Tromp arrived in Scilly to demand reparation from the Royalist fleet for the Dutch ships and goods taken by them.

According to Whitelocke's Memorials, a letter of 17 April 1651 explains: "Tromp came to Pendennis and related that he had been to Scilly to demand reparation for the Dutch ships and goods taken by them; and receiving no satisfactory answer, he had, according to his Commission, declared war on them." As most of England was now in Parliamentarian hands, war was declared specifically upon the Isles of Scilly.

=== Royalist surrender ===
In June 1651, soon after the declaration of war, the Parliamentarian forces under Admiral Robert Blake forced the Royalist fleet to surrender. The Dutch fleet, no longer under threat, left without firing a shot. Due to the obscurity of one nation's declaration of war against a small part of another, the Dutch did not officially declare peace. When the Dutch and the Commonwealth of England signed the Treaty of Westminster (1654), this separate state of war was not mentioned and thus not included in the peace.

=== Peace treaty ===
For many years in the Isles of Scilly, the local legend was that the state of war was still in effect. In 1986, Roy Duncan, a local historian and chairman of the Isles of Scilly Council, investigated the alleged war and wrote to the Embassy of the Netherlands in London. Dutch embassy staff found that no peace treaty had ever been signed, and Duncan invited the Dutch ambassador to Britain, Jonkheer Rein Huydecoper, to visit the islands and officially end the "conflict". Peace was declared on 17 April 1986, 335 years after the supposed declaration of war; Huydecoper joked that it must have been horrifying to the Scillonians "to know we could have attacked at any moment."

== Authenticity ==
Bowley (2001) argues that the letter in Whitelocke's Memorials is the probable origin of the "declaring war" legend: "Tromp had no 'Commission' from his government to declare war on the rebels in Scilly; but he did come to try – by a show of force, threats and even by violence perhaps, although this never happened – to seek reparation for Royalist piracies, but short of resorting to any action which might offend the Commonwealth ...even if [a war] had occurred in 1651, all matters pertaining would have been resolved in 1654 as a part of the treaty between England and the United Provinces at the end of the First Dutch War".

The reality of this war is also disputed by Graeme Donald. In his book Loose Cannons: 101 Myths, Mishaps and Misadventurers of Military History he argues that no such war could have existed because neither side was sovereign: "Tromp was an admiral, not a nation, and Scilly part of England". He goes on to describe it as "a great PR coup for the island's tourist board".

== See also ==
- Anglo-Zanzibar War, generally considered the world's shortest war
- Arauco War (1536–1881), another example of a very long war
- List of wars extended by diplomatic irregularity
