= Valdrin Lluka =

Kosovo politician

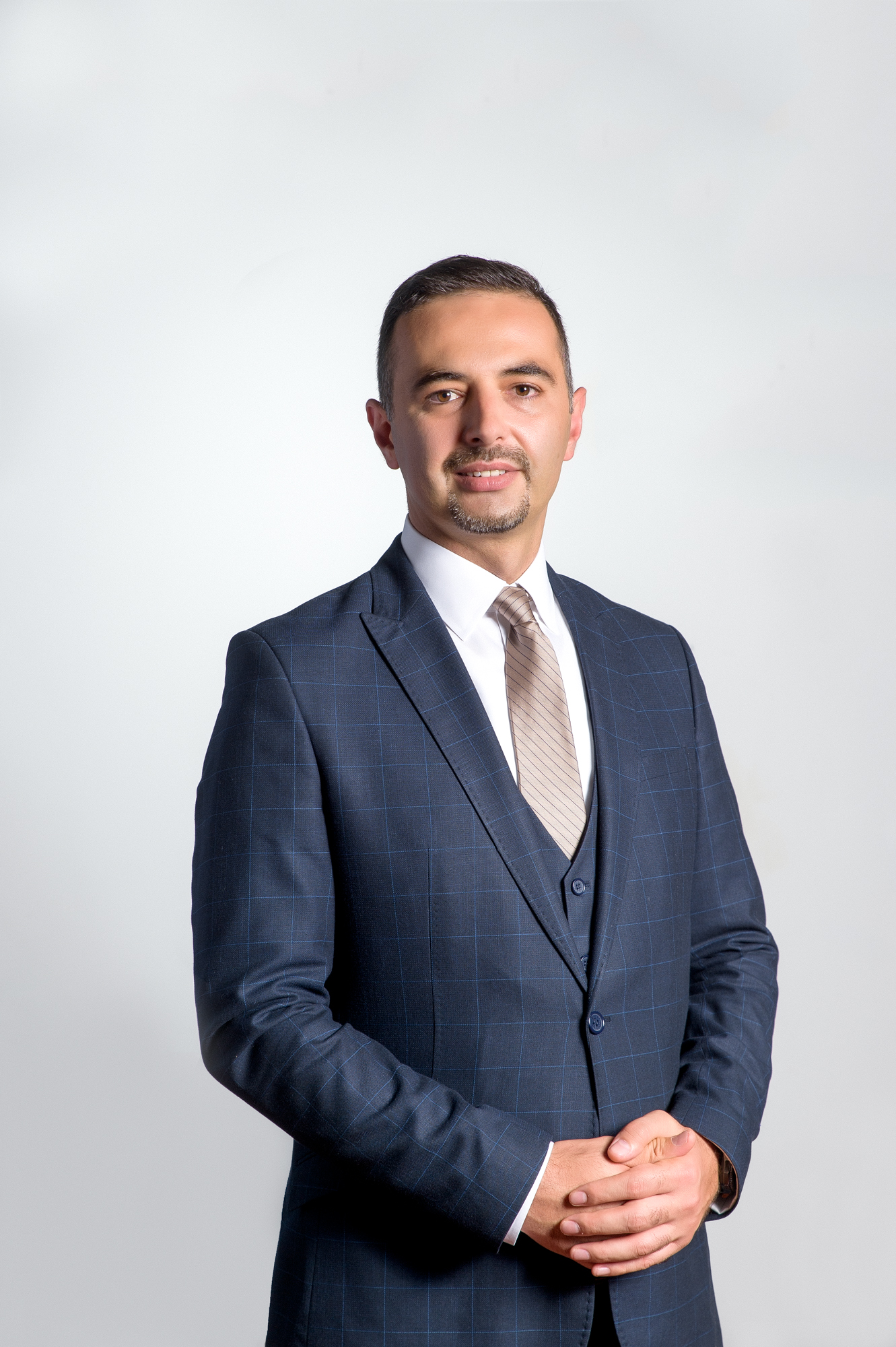

Minister of Economic Development / Government of Kosovo
- In office 2017–2020
- Prime Minister: Ramush Haradinaj
- Preceded by: Blerand Stavileci
- Succeeded by: Rozeta Hajdari

Personal details
- Born: 28 December 1980 (age 45) Đakovica Yugoslavia (now Gjakova, Kosovo)
- Party: New Kosovo Alliance
- Spouse: Jehona Lluka
- Children: 2
- Parent(s): Masar Lluka, Miljane Lluka
- Education: Carlson School of Management, University of Minnesota (MBA); American University in Bulgaria (BA in Economics)
- Website: Official Website

Valdrin Lluka (born December 28, 1980) is a politician and executive from Kosovo who served as the Minister of Economic Development in the Government of the Republic of Kosovo between 2017 and 2020. He graduated from the University of Minnesota's Carlson School of Management in the United States.

He also served as the chief executive officer of the Kosovo Investment and Enterprise Support Agency, a government agency responsible for investment and export promotion from 2011 to 2014. Responsible for the development of the energy, mining, information and communications technology, water and waste management sectors and the supervision of all public enterprises in Kosovo.

Valdrin Lluka is member of the New Kosovo Alliance (Aleanca Kosova e Re), a liberal party in Kosovo, part of Alliance of Liberals and Democrats for Europe Party.

== Biography ==
Valdrin Lluka finished his elementary school (Mustafa Bakija elementary school) and high school (Hajdar Dushi gymnasium) in his hometown, Gjakova. During the war in Kosovo in 1998, Lluka had to spend a year in Tirana, Albania where he also finished the last year of high schools at Ismail Qemali gymnasium in Tirana.

Lluka holds an MBA degree from the University of Minnesota, Carlson School of Management (2007 – 2009) and BA degree in Economics and Information Systems from the American University in Bulgaria (2002 – 2005).

Lluka worked for Deloitte, Carlson Consulting Enterprise and mobile virtual network operator Z mobile (2005 – 2010).

Lluka served as the 6th Minister of Economic Development in the Government of the Republic of Kosovo, covering sectors such as Energy, Mining, Information and Communications Technology, Water Management, Waste Management, Telecommunication and Postal Services. Some of the projects that Minister Lluka has developed and signed include the construction of a new, 1.3 billion euro power-plant, the establishment of the energy efficiency fund, the establishment of Kosovo Digital Economy Program, the establishment of TechPark Prishtina and Digital Excellence Center (some of the biggest parks in the region that support entrepreneurs and innovators), the establishment of creative centers in all high schools of Kosovo and digitalization of the water utility companies through smart grids.

Other responsibilities that Lluka was responsible for are Board Member at Millennium Challenge Corporation Kosovo, Head of the Ministerial Committee for Public Enterprises, Head of the Steering Committee for the New Kosovo Power Plant project and member of several ministerial committees with economic character.

== Volunteer work ==
Lluka volunteered as the co-chair of the Kosovo American Education Fund (KAEF) Committee (2014 – 2018).

== Marriage and children ==
Minister Lluka is married to Jehona Lluka and has two sons.

== Political views ==
Valdrin Lluka is member of the New Kosovo Alliance (Aleanca Kosova e Re), a liberal party in Kosovo, part of Alliance of Liberals and Democrats for Europe Party.

== Awards ==
Valdrin Lluka was awarded the Distinguished Leadership Award for Internationals by the University of Minnesota[, recognizing the outstanding achievements Lluka has made as a leader in his professional career.

== See also ==
- Isa Mustafa
- Behgjet Pacolli
