= Japan–Serbia relations =

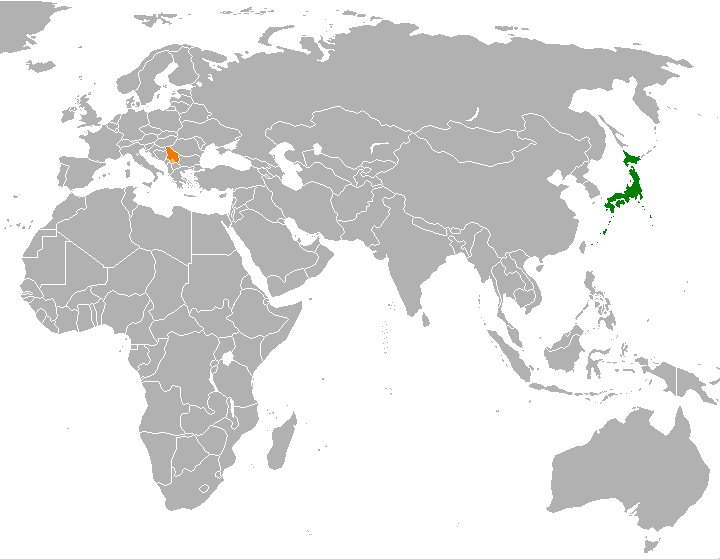
- Japan: Serbia

Japan and Serbia maintain diplomatic relations established in 1917. From 1918 to 2006, Japan maintained relations with the Kingdom of Yugoslavia, the Socialist Federal Republic of Yugoslavia (SFRY), and the Federal Republic of Yugoslavia (FRY) (later Serbia and Montenegro), of which Serbia is considered shared (SFRY) or sole (FRY) legal successor.

== Economic relations ==
Japan is considered one of Serbia's most important trading partners in Asia. Trade between two countries amounted to $307 million in 2023 with Japanese merchandise exports to Serbia standing at almost $224 million while Serbian exports stood at $82 million.

Japanese companies present in Serbia include Nidec (automotive parts factory in Novi Sad), Japan Tobacco International (tobacco factory in Senta), Toyo Tires (tire factory in Inđija), and Yazaki (automotive parts factory in Šabac).

== Resident diplomatic missions ==
- Japan has an embassy in Belgrade.
- Serbia has an embassy in Tokyo.
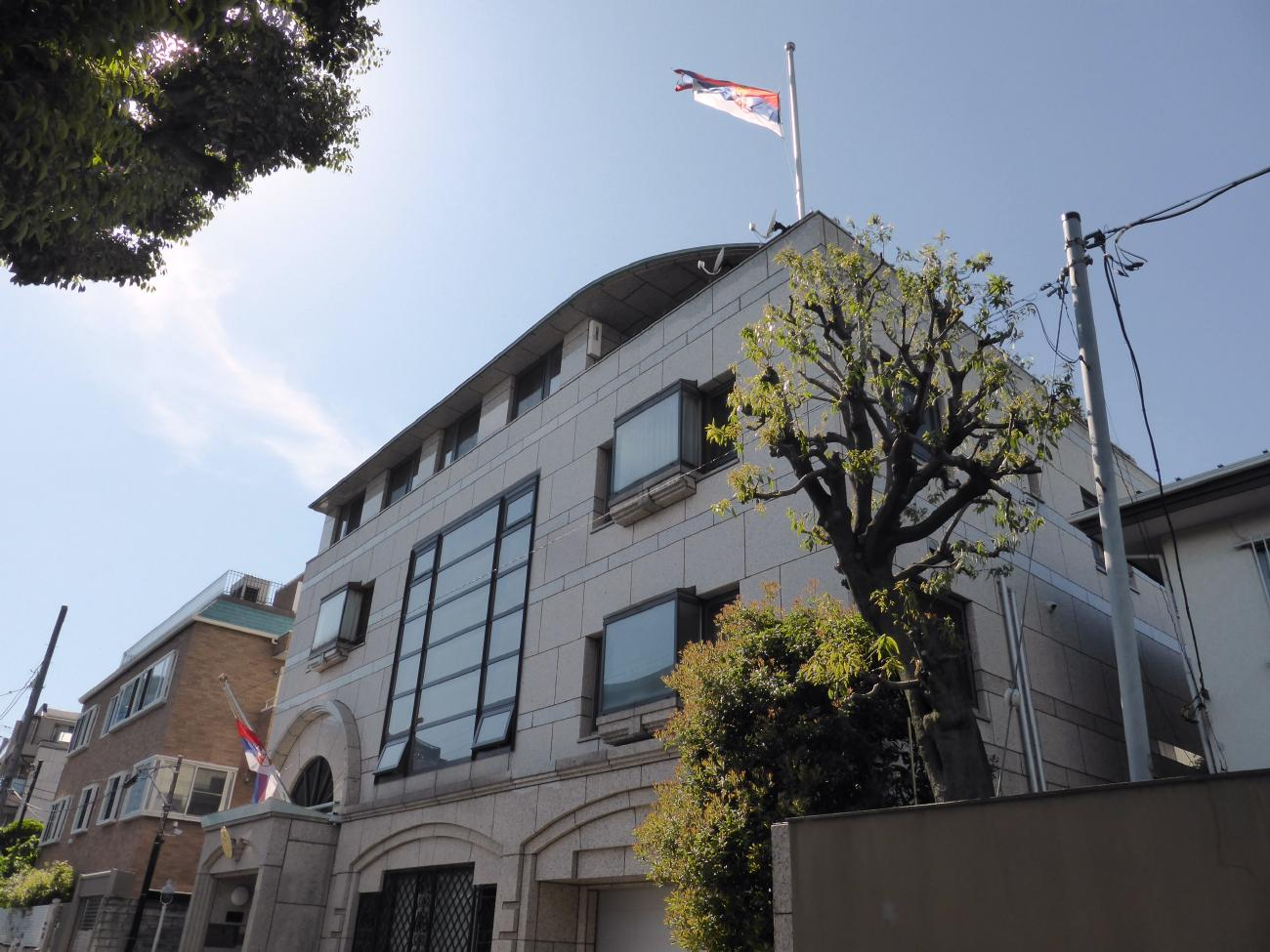
Embassy of Serbia in Tokyo

== See also ==
- Foreign relations of Japan
- Foreign relations of Serbia
- Japan–Yugoslavia relations
