= Zeno Żebrowski =

Polish Catholic Missionary in Japan

Brother Zeno Żebrowski
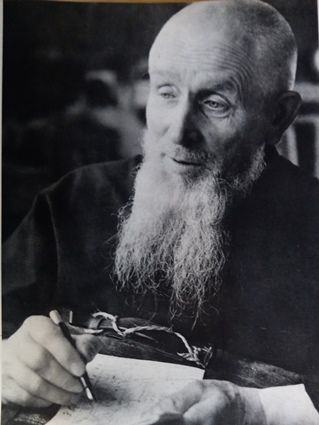
- Br. Zenon Żebrowski 1959
- Born: Władysław Żebrowski; Around 1898; Surowe, Poland
- Died: April 24, 1982 (Aged 84); Tokyo, Japan
- Occupation: Conventual Franciscan
- Church: Roman Catholic Church

Zeno Żebrowski (in Japanese ゼノ・ゼブロフスキー), birth name Władysław Żebrowski, was a conventual Franciscan missionary who was born around 1898 in Surowe, and died April 24, 1982, in Tokyo.

== Life in Poland ==
Żebrowski was born into a peasant family, and did not finish any level of education. He participated in the Polish-Bolshevik War, hoping to enlist as a machine-gunner. He was placed in a cavalry unit and eventually got reassigned to hospital duties. In 1924 he worked in a Jewish factory. In 1925 he entered the Franciscan order in Grodno, taking the name Zenon. He took part in the publishing of the "Knight of the Immaculate" magazine and participated in the construction of a monastery in Niepokalanów.

== Work in Japan ==
Together with Maximilian Kolbe he went on a mission to Japan, arriving in Nagasaki on April 24, 1930. Shortly after their arrival, they began printing the "Knight of the Immaculate" in Japanese under the name "Seibo no Kishi". He participated in the creation of a Catholic monastery in Nagasaki called “the Japanese Niepokalanów”. The location was chosen in part because it was suitable for a Lourdes grotto. After the end of World War II, he began organizing orphanages for Japanese children and establishing housing for the homeless. The extent of Zeno's activities were such that the government gave him free transport on Japan's trains and buses. He was given the title "Uncle of the Orphans" by the Japanese, and was known for telling his charges "Everyone will make good if he prays to Our Lady". Żebrowski was a contemporary and associate of Satoko Kitahara, who is now considered Venerable by the Catholic Church. He was heavily involved in the development of Ari no Machi, a ragpicker community which would become famous due to Kitahara's involvement. In 1969 he received the 4th class of the Order of the Sacred Treasure from the Emperor, and in 1979 at the foot of Mount Fuji a monument to him was erected by Adolf Ryszka and Togashi Hajime. The Polish government honored him in 1976 with the Gold Cross of Merit of the PRL.

== Appearances in Media ==
Between 2017 and 2018 a documentary directed by Marta Sokołowska was made about the years Żebrowski spent in Japan. The film is called Zeno-San, and it involves interviews with contemporaries of Zeno and with some of his family. In May 15, 1999, an anime film titled "Zeno: Unlimited Love" was aired in Japan, covering the life of Zeno, particularly his charitable work.

== See also ==
- Militia Immaculatae
