= Tsuneko Kondo-Kavese =

- Born: 1 March 1893; Gifu, Japan
- Died: 25 January 1963 (aged 69); Ljubljana, Slovenia
- Other names: Marija Skušek
- Occupation: nurse

Tsuneko Kondo-Kavese (近藤恒子, Kondō Tsuneko; 1 March 1893 – 25 January 1963) was a Japanese and Slovenian nurse, promoter of Japanese culture in Yugoslavia.

== Life and work ==
Kondo-Kavese Tsuneko was born in Gifu, Japan, a daughter of court architect Kondo-Kavese Kagijiro. After the Russo-Japanese War, she relocated with her family to Beijing, where she studied medicine, though she did not graduate. In the International Club, she met Ivan Skušek, a Slovenian officer (first class superior naval inspector) of the Austro-Hungarian Navy who was stationed aboard cruiser SMS Kaiserin Elisabeth. The couple married in Beijing and in 1920 the family (couple, her son and daughter from first marriage) left China and moved to Ljubljana, where she soon learned Slovenian. She served as head nurse for the Red Cross and became an active council member. She received the Red Cross' highest award in 1962.

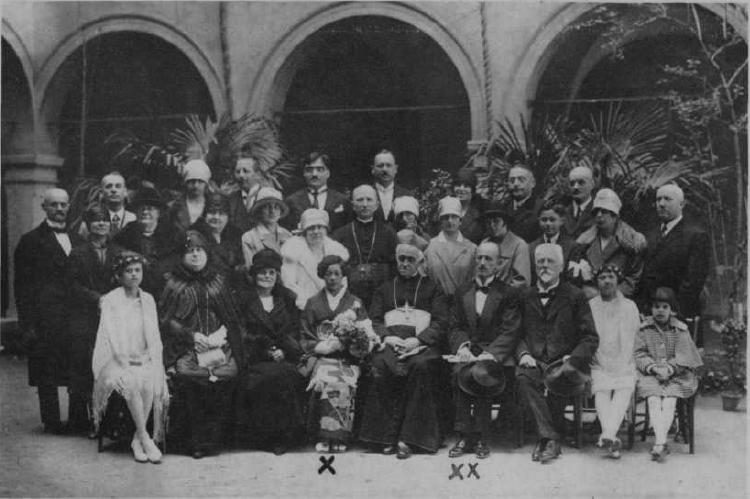
Tsuneko Kondo-Kavese (X) and Ivan Skušek (XX) church wedding in Ljubljana (1927)

She also promoted cultural exchange between Japan and Slovenia (then part of Yugoslavia). Between 1930 and 1960 she held a series of lectures on Japan, first in German and later in Slovenian, which were published in various newspapers. She also lectured on Japan on the then newly established Radio Ljubljana. She died on January 25, 1963. She is buried in Ljubljana, at the Žale cemetery.

Tsuneko and Skušek arrived from China to Ljubljana with a collection of over 500 pieces of Chinese and Japanese artwork and antiques, which she bequeathed to the Slovene Ethnographic Museum in 1963.
