= Foreign relations of Denmark =

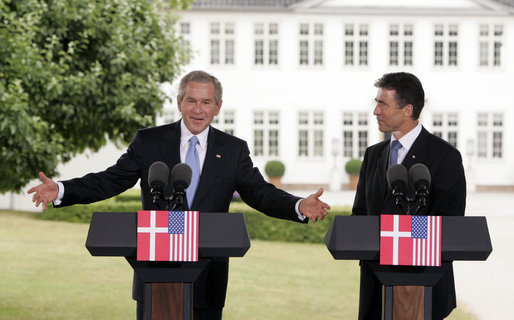
U.S. President George W. Bush and Prime Minister Anders Fogh Rasmussen hold a joint press conference outside Marienborg, July 2005.

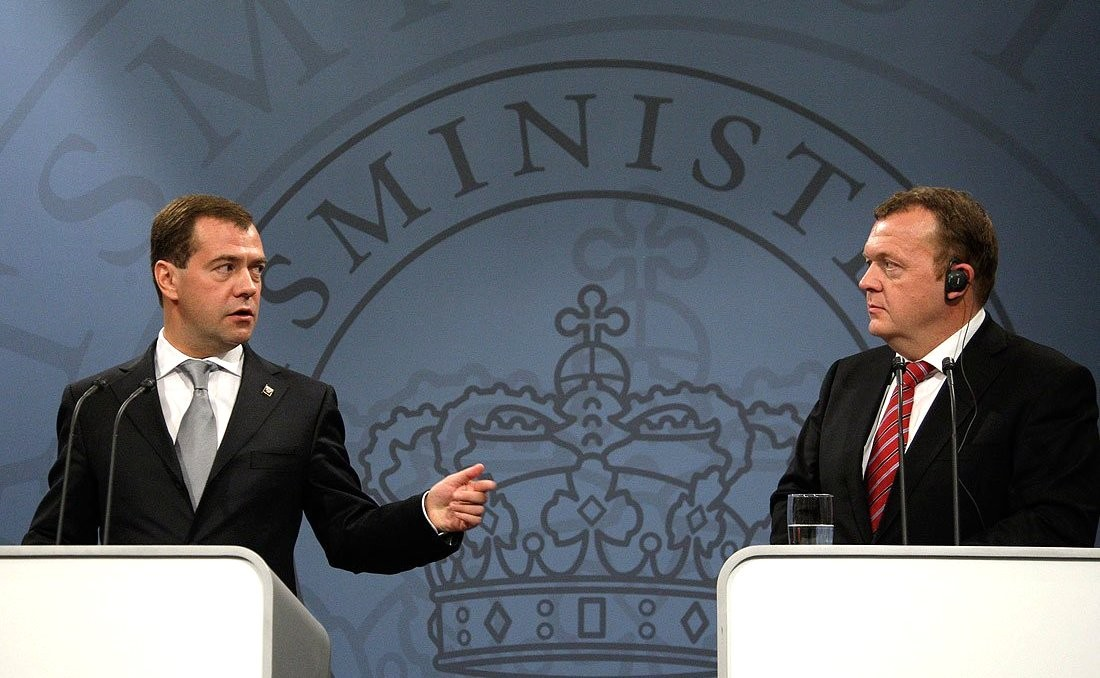
Russian President Dmitry Medvedev and Danish Prime Minister Lars Løkke Rasmussen hold a joint press conference, April 2010.

The foreign policy of Denmark is based on its identity as a sovereign state in Europe, the Arctic and the North Atlantic. As such its primary foreign policy focus is on its relations with other nations as a sovereign state compromising the three constituent countries: Denmark, Greenland and the Faroe Islands. Denmark has long had good relations with other nations. It has been involved in coordinating Western assistance to the Baltic states (Estonia, Latvia, and Lithuania).

The country is a strong supporter of international peacekeeping. Danish forces were heavily engaged in the former Yugoslavia in the UN Protection Force (UNPROFOR), with IFOR, and now SFOR. Denmark also strongly supported American operations in Afghanistan and has contributed both monetarily and materially to the ISAF. These initiatives are a part of the "active foreign policy" of Denmark.

Instead of the traditional adaptative foreign policy of The unity of the Realm, Kingdom of Denmark is today pursuing an active foreign policy, where human rights, democracy and other crucial values are to be defended actively. In recent years, Greenland and the Faroe Islands have been guaranteed a say in foreign policy issues, such as fishing, whaling and geopolitical concerns.

Following World War II, Denmark ended its two-hundred-year-long policy of neutrality. Denmark has been a member of NATO since its founding in 1949, and membership in NATO remains highly popular. There were several serious confrontations between the U.S. and Denmark on security policy in the so-called "footnote era" (1982–88), when an alternative parliamentary majority forced the government to adopt specific national positions on nuclear and arms control issues.

The alternative majority in these issues was because the Social liberal Party (Radikale Venstre) supported the governing majority in economic policy issues, but was against certain NATO policies and voted with the left in these issues. The conservative led Centre-right government accepted this variety of "minority parliamentarism", that is, without making it a question of the government's parliamentary survival. With the end of the Cold War, Denmark has been supportive of U.S. policy objectives in the Alliance.

Danes have a reputation as "reluctant" Europeans. When they rejected ratification of the Maastricht Treaty on 2 June 1992, they put the EC's plans for the European Union on hold. In December 1992, the rest of the EC agreed to exempt Denmark from certain aspects of the European Union, including a common security and defense policy, a common currency, EU citizenship, and certain aspects of legal cooperation. The Amsterdam Treaty was approved in the referendum of 28 May 1998.

In the autumn of 2000, Danish citizens rejected membership of the Euro currency group in a referendum. The Lisbon treaty was ratified by the Danish parliament alone. It was not considered a surrendering of national sovereignty, which would have implied the holding of a referendum according to article 20 of the constitution.

== History ==
In 1807 Denmark was neutral but Britain bombarded Copenhagen and seized the Danish Navy, Denmark became an ally of Napoleon. After Napoleon was profoundly defeated in Russia in 1812, the Allies repeatedly offered King Frederick VI a proposal to change sides and break with Napoleon. The king refused. Therefore, at the peace of Kiel in 1814, Denmark was forced to cede Norway to Sweden. Denmark thus became one of the chief losers of the Napoleonic Wars. Danish historiography portrayed King Frederick VI as stubborn and incompetent, and motivated by a blind loyalty to Napoleon. A more recent Danish historiographical approach emphasizes the Danish state was multi-territorial, and included the semi – separate Kingdom of Norway. It was dependent for food on grain imports controlled by Napoleon, and worried about Swedish ambitions. From the king's perspective, these factors called for an alliance with Napoleon. Furthermore, the king expected the war would end in a negotiated international conference, with Napoleon playing a powerful role that included saving Norway for Denmark.

=== 1900–1945 ===
The Danish government responded to the First World War by declaring neutrality 1914–1918. It maintained that status until 1945 and accordingly adjusted trade; humanitarianism; diplomacy; and attitudes. The war thus reshaped economic relations and shifting domestic power balances.

=== 1990– ===
Since the end of the Cold War, Denmark has become more supportive of U.S. foreign policy. Denmark supported the U.S. invasion of Iraq in 2003 and contributed assets to the invasion. Denmark also participated in the Afghanistan War. Denmark increased its participation in military and peacekeeping operations compared to the pre-Cold War period. Whereas Denmark only participated in 13 military operations from 1945 to 1989, Denmark participated in 76 military operations between 1990 and 2018.

== International disputes ==
- North Pole. Denmark is trying to prove that the North Pole is geographically connected to Greenland. If such proof is established, the Kingdom will claim the North Pole.

== Settled international disputes ==
- Hans Island. An island located between Greenland and Canadian Arctic islands. Unresolved boundary disputed between Canada and Denmark (The state of Denmark is responsible for Greenland's foreign relations). This dispute flared up again in July 2005 following the visit of a Canadian minister to the disputed island. On 14 June 2022 both countries agreed to split the disputed island in half. In accordance with the Greenland home rule treaty, Denmark handles certain foreign affairs, such as border disputes, on behalf of the entire Danish Realm.

== Diplomatic relations ==
List of countries which Denmark maintains diplomatic relations with:

#	Country	Date
1	United Kingdom	25 October 1401
2	Russia	8 November 1493
3	France	8 July 1498
4	Spain	1 April 1516
5	Sweden	6 June 1523
6	Netherlands	31 March 1605
7	Portugal	18 March 1641
8	United States	12 October 1801
9	Mexico	19 July 1827
10	Brazil	26 April 1828
11	Belgium	25 February 1837
12	Argentina	20 January 1841
13	Uruguay	28 February 1842
14	Venezuela	28 February 1842
15	Dominican Republic	17 December 1851
16	Thailand	21 May 1858
17	Italy	2 September 1861
18	Greece	29 July 1863
19	Japan	16 December 1867
20	Guatemala	30 April 1880
21	Norway	7 November 1905
22	Luxembourg	4 June 1906
23	Cuba	29 June 1911
24	Romania	1 May 1917
25	Serbia	19 October 1917
26	Finland	18 February 1918
27	Switzerland	26 October 1918
28	Austria	11 November 1918
29	Poland	8 September 1919
30	Iceland	16 August 1920
31	Czech Republic	4 September 1920
32	Hungary	12 November 1920
33	Peru	22 July 1921
34	Iran	3 February 1922
35	Egypt	1 June 1922
36	Turkey	26 January 1925
37	Chile	23 April 1925
38	Bolivia	29 December 1926
39	Bulgaria	17 April 1931
40	Colombia	18 May 1935
41	Panama	30 June 1937
42	Canada	5 December 1945
43	Honduras	19 April 1946
44	South Africa	4 May 1946
45	Philippines	28 September 1946
46	Nicaragua	1 May 1947
47	Haiti	12 August 1947
48	Australia	12 September 1947
49	New Zealand	12 September 1947
50	Costa Rica	3 October 1947
51	El Salvador	20 October 1947
52	Ecuador	22 September 1948
53	India	10 September 1949
54	Pakistan	13 October 1949
55	Indonesia	15 February 1950
56	Ethiopia	21 February 1950
57	China	11 May 1950
58	Israel	7 December 1950
59	Germany	27 June 1951
60	Paraguay	9 October 1951
61	Sri Lanka	5 January 1953
62	Lebanon	6 October 1953
63	Iraq	3 November 1953
64	Syria	10 December 1953
65	Myanmar	22 April 1955
66	Cambodia	29 February 1956
67	Laos	1 November 1956
68	Malaysia	31 August 1957
69	Morocco	29 November 1957
70	Jordan	18 January 1958
71	Sudan	8 May 1958
72	South Korea	11 March 1959
73	Tunisia	1 September 1959
74	Somalia	9 July 1960
75	Cyprus	2 November 1960
76	Cameroon	1960
77	Senegal	16 May 1961
78	Ghana	28 September 1961
79	Libya	17 October 1961
80	Guinea	1 December 1961
81	Ireland	January 1962
82	Nigeria	15 February 1962
83	Democratic Republic of the Congo	3 August 1962
84	Rwanda	2 April 1963
85	Liberia	11 July 1963
86	Algeria	3 September 1963
87	Kuwait	25 April 1964
88	Kenya	23 October 1964
89	Ivory Coast	28 November 1964
90	Tanzania	8 December 1964
91	Benin	15 December 1964
92	Madagascar	1964
93	Uganda	26 January 1965
94	Zambia	10 February 1965
95	Niger	25 May 1965
96	Burundi	25 June 1965
97	Singapore	28 September 1965
98	Afghanistan	26 January 1966
99	Gabon	22 February 1966
100	Malawi	22 February 1966
101	Republic of the Congo	10 June 1967
102	Nepal	15 December 1967
103	Botswana	18 April 1968
104	Togo	21 June 1968
105	Mongolia	5 August 1968
106	Malta	26 March 1969
107	Albania	29 May 1970
108	Vietnam	25 November 1971
109	Bangladesh	4 February 1972
110	Trinidad and Tobago	23 May 1972
111	Sierra Leone	22 January 1973
112	Mauritius	2 March 1973
113	North Korea	17 July 1973
114	Bahrain	10 August 1974
115	Jamaica	14 October 1974
116	Qatar	15 December 1974
117	United Arab Emirates	18 January 1975
118	Saudi Arabia	1 February 1975
119	Mauritania	19 April 1975
120	Yemen	1 May 1975
121	Mozambique	25 June 1975
122	Lesotho	21 January 1976
123	Oman	10 April 1976
124	Angola	16 September 1976
125	Guyana	18 November 1977
126	Papua New Guinea	February 1978
127	Gambia	January 1979
128	Barbados	20 August 1979
129	Seychelles	27 November 1979
130	Zimbabwe	18 April 1980
131	Suriname	27 November 1980
132	Burkina Faso	21 January 1981
133	Comoros	1 December 1981
—	Holy See	2 August 1982
134	Maldives	8 November 1982
135	Saint Lucia	20 December 1982
136	Guinea-Bissau	26 May 1983
137	Brunei	24 January 1985
138	Bhutan	13 August 1985
139	Saint Vincent and the Grenadines	19 September 1985
140	Antigua and Barbuda	20 October 1985
141	Tonga	31 October 1985
142	Saint Kitts and Nevis	23 March 1989
143	Namibia	21 March 1990
144	Bahamas	June 1991
145	Estonia	24 August 1991
146	Latvia	24 August 1991
147	Lithuania	24 August 1991
148	Belize	15 November 1991
149	Armenia	14 January 1992
150	Moldova	20 January 1992
151	Slovenia	20 January 1992
152	Tajikistan	21 January 1992
153	Turkmenistan	21 January 1992
154	Uzbekistan	25 January 1992
155	Croatia	1 February 1992
156	Belarus	4 February 1992
157	Ukraine	12 February 1992
158	Liechtenstein	13 March 1992
159	Azerbaijan	2 April 1992
160	Kazakhstan	7 May 1992
161	Kyrgyzstan	8 May 1992
162	Bosnia and Herzegovina	2 June 1992
163	Georgia	1 July 1992
164	Marshall Islands	17 September 1992
165	San Marino	3 November 1992
166	Slovakia	1 January 1993
167	Eritrea	28 September 1993
168	North Macedonia	16 December 1993
169	Andorra	4 May 1994
170	Eswatini	4 February 1997
171	Fiji	1 December 1997
172	Chad	23 October 1998
173	Mali	10 April 2002
174	Djibouti	10 December 2002
175	Timor-Leste	12 February 2003
176	Montenegro	15 June 2006
—	Kosovo	6 March 2008
177	Cape Verde	17 February 2011
178	Monaco	16 July 2011
179	South Sudan	4 May 2012
180	Equatorial Guinea	7 November 2014
181	Federated States of Micronesia	29 August 2018
182	Vanuatu	25 October 2018
183	Grenada	6 November 2018
184	Palau	30 November 2018
185	Dominica	20 February 2019
186	São Tomé and Príncipe	20 February 2019
187	Central African Republic	18 March 2025

== Bilateral relations ==
=== Europe ===
Country	Formal relations began	Notes
Albania	29 May 1970	See Albania–Denmark relations: Albania has an embassy in Copenhagen.; Denmark has an embassy in Tirana.; Both countries are full members of NATO.
Andorra	4 May 1994	Andorra is represented in Denmark through a non-resident ambassador based in Andorra La Vella.; Denmark is represented in Andorra, through its embassy in Madrid.
Armenia	14 January 1992	See Armenia–Denmark relations: Armenia has an embassy in Copenhagen.; Denmark is represented in Armenia, through its embassy in Kyiv.
Austria	11 November 1918	See Austria–Denmark relations: Austria has an embassy in Copenhagen.; Denmark has an embassy in Vienna.; Both countries are full members of the European Union.
Azerbaijan	2 April 1992	See Azerbaijan–Denmark relations: Azerbaijan is represented in Denmark, through its embassy in the United Kingdom.; Denmark is represented in Azerbaijan, through its embassy in Turkey.
Belarus	4 February 1992	See Belarus–Denmark relations: Belarus is represented in Denmark, through its embassy in Sweden.; Denmark is represented through its embassy in Moscow.
Belgium	25 February 1837	See Belgium–Denmark relations: Belgium has an embassy in Copenhagen.; Denmark has an embassy in Brussels.; Both countries are full members of the European Union and NATO.
Bosnia and Herzegovina	2 June 1992	See Bosnia and Herzegovina–Denmark relations: Bosnia and Herzegovina has an embassy in Copenhagen.; Denmark is represented in Bosnia and Herzegovina through its embassy in Belgrade.
Bulgaria	17 April 1931	See Bulgaria–Denmark relations: Bulgaria has an embassy in Copenhagen.; Denmark has an embassy in Sofia.; Both countries are full members of the European Union and NATO.
Croatia	1 February 1992	See Croatia–Denmark relations: Croatia has an embassy in Copenhagen.; Denmark has an embassy in Zagreb.; Both countries are full members of the European Union and NATO.
Cyprus	2 November 1960	See Cyprus–Denmark relations: Cyprus has an embassy in Copenhagen.; Denmark has an embassy in Nicosia.; Both countries are full members of the European Union.
Czech Republic	14 May 1919	See Czech Republic–Denmark relations: Czech Republic has an embassy in Copenhagen.; Denmark has an embassy in Prague.; Both countries are full members of the European Union and NATO.
Estonia	24 August 1991	See Denmark–Estonia relations: After the restoration of Estonia's independence in 1991, Denmark was the second country to re-establish diplomatic relations with Estonia on 24 August 1991.; Denmark has an embassy in Tallinn.; Estonia has an embassy in Copenhagen.; "Estonian Foreign Affairs: Country by Country". Archived from the original on 18 July 2007.; Both countries are full members of the European Union and NATO.
Finland	18 February 1918	See Denmark–Finland relations: Finland has an embassy in Copenhagen.; Denmark has an embassy in Helsinki.; "Ministry of Foreign Affairs of Finland: Denmark". Archived from the original on 20 August 2011.; Both countries are full members of the European Union and NATO.
France	8 July 1498	See Denmark–France relations: Denmark has an embassy in Paris.; France has an embassy in Copenhagen.; "French Foreign Affairs Ministry about relations with Denmark" (in Danish).; Both countries are full members of the European Union and NATO.
Georgia	1 July 1992	See Denmark–Georgia relations: Denmark is represented in Georgia through its embassy in Ukraine.; Georgia has an embassy in Copenhagen.; Denmark is an EU member and Georgia is an EU candidate.
Germany	27 June 1951	See Denmark–Germany relations: Denmark has an embassy in Berlin.; Germany has an embassy in Copenhagen.; Both countries are full members of the European Union and NATO.
Greece	29 July 1863	See Denmark–Greece relations: Denmark has an embassy in Athens.; Greece has an embassy in Copenhagen.; Both countries are full members of the European Union and NATO.
Holy See	2 August 1982	Denmark's diplomatic relations with the Vatican City were established in 1982 after having been suspended since the reformation in 1536.; Denmark is represented in the Vatican City, through its embassy in Bern.
Hungary	12 November 1920	See Denmark–Hungary relations: Denmark has an embassy in Budapest.; Hungary has an embassy in Copenhagen.; Both countries are full members of the European Union and NATO.
Iceland	16 August 1920	See Denmark–Iceland relations: Denmark has an embassy in Reykjavík.; Iceland has an embassy in Copenhagen.; Both countries are full members of NATO.
Ireland	January 1962	See Denmark–Ireland relations: Denmark has an embassy in Dublin and three honorary consulates (Cork, Limerick and Waterford).; Ireland has an embassy in Copenhagen.; Both countries became members of the European Union on 1 January 1973.
Italy	2 September 1861	See Denmark–Italy relations: Denmark has an embassy in Rome, and a consulate general in Milan.; Italy has an embassy in Copenhagen.; Both countries are full members of the European Union and NATO.
Kosovo	6 March 2008	See Denmark–Kosovo relations: Denmark recognized Kosovo on 21 February 2008.; Denmark is represented in Kosovo, through its embassy in Vienna.
Latvia	24 August 1991	See Denmark–Latvia relations: Denmark has an embassy in Riga.; Latvia has an embassy in Copenhagen.; Both countries are full members of the European Union and NATO.
Liechtenstein	13 March 1992	Liechtenstein is represented in Denmark through its embassy in Switzerland.
Lithuania	24 August 1991	See Denmark–Lithuania relations: Denmark has an embassy in Vilnius.; Lithuania has an embassy in Copenhagen.; Both countries are full members of the European Union and NATO.
Luxembourg	4 June 1906	Denmark is represented in Luxembourg through its embassy in Brussels, Belgium. Denmark also has a consulate in Luxembourg City.; Luxembourg has an embassy in Copenhagen.; Both countries are full members of the European Union and NATO.
Malta	26 March 1969	Denmark has a consulate general in Valletta.; Malta has an embassy in Copenhagen.; Both countries are full members of the European Union.
Moldova	20 January 1992	See Denmark–Moldova relations: Denmark is represented in Moldova through its embassy in Bucharest.; Moldova is represented in Denmark through its embassy in Berlin.; Denmark is an EU member and Moldova is an EU candidate.
Monaco	16 July 2011	Denmark is represented in Monaco, through its embassy in Paris.
Montenegro	15 June 2006	See Denmark–Montenegro relations: Denmark is represented in Montenegro through its embassy in Serbia.; Montenegro is represented in Denmark through a non-resident ambassador based in Podgorica.; Both countries are full members of NATO.; Denmark is an EU member and Montenegro is an EU candidate.
Netherlands	31 March 1605	See Denmark–Netherlands relations: Denmark has an embassy in The Hague.; The Netherlands has an embassy in Copenhagen.; Both countries are full members of the European Union and NATO.
North Macedonia	16 December 1993	See Denmark–North Macedonia relations: Denmark is represented in North Macedonia, through its embassy in Belgrade.; North Macedonia has an embassy in Copenhagen.; Both countries are full members of NATO.
Norway	7 November 1905	See Denmark–Norway relations: Denmark has an embassy in Oslo.; Norway has an embassy in Copenhagen.; Both countries are full members of NATO.
Poland	8 September 1919	See Denmark–Poland relations: Denmark has an embassy in Warsaw.; Poland has an embassy in Copenhagen.; Both countries are full members of the European Union and NATO.
Portugal	18 March 1641	See Denmark–Portugal relations: Portugal has an embassy in Copenhagen.; Denmark has an embassy in Lisbon.; Both countries are full members of the European Union and NATO.
Romania	1 May 1917	See Denmark–Romania relations: Denmark has an embassy in Bucharest.; Romania has an embassy in Copenhagen.; Both countries are full members of the European Union and NATO.
Russia	8 November 1493	See Denmark–Russia relations: Russia has an embassy in Copenhagen.; Denmark has an embassy in Moscow, a consulate-general in Saint Petersburg.
San Marino	3 November 1992	Denmark is represented in San Marino through its embassy in Rome.; San Marino is represented in Denmark through a non-resident ambassador based in City of San Marino.
Serbia	19 October 1917	See Denmark–Serbia relations: Denmark has an embassy in Belgrade.; Serbia has an embassy in Copenhagen.; Denmark is an EU member and Serbia is an EU candidate.; There are around 12,000 people of Serbian descent living in Denmark.
Slovakia	1 January 1993	See Denmark–Slovakia relations: Denmark has an embassy in Bratislava.; Slovakia has an embassy in Copenhagen.; Both countries are full members of the European Union and NATO.
Slovenia	20 January 1992	See Denmark–Slovenia relations: Denmark has an embassy in Ljubljana.; Slovenia has an embassy in Copenhagen.; Both countries are full members of the European Union and NATO.
Spain	1 April 1516	See Denmark–Spain relations: Denmark has an embassy in Madrid.; Spain has an embassy in Copenhagen.; Both countries are full members of the European Union and NATO.
Sweden	6 June 1523	See Denmark–Sweden relations: Sweden has an embassy in Copenhagen; Denmark has an embassy in Stockholm.; Both countries are full members of the European Union and NATO.
Switzerland	10 February 1875	See Denmark–Switzerland relations: Denmark has an embassy in Bern.; Switzerland has an embassy in Copenhagen.
Ukraine	12 February 1992	See Denmark–Ukraine relations: Denmark has an embassy in Kyiv.; Ukraine has an embassy in Copenhagen.; Denmark is an EU member and Ukraine is an EU candidate.
United Kingdom	25 October 1401	See Denmark–United Kingdom relations Danish Prime Minister Mette Frederiksen with British Prime Minister Keir Starmer in 10 Downing Street, February 2025. Denmark established diplomatic relations with the United Kingdom on 25 October 1401.: Denmark maintains an embassy in London.; The United Kingdom is accredited to Denmark through its embassy in Copenhagen.; Both countries share common membership of the Council of Europe, the European Court of Human Rights, the International Criminal Court, the Joint Expeditionary Force, NATO, the OECD, the OSCE, the United Nations, and the World Trade Organization. Bilaterally the two countries have a Double Taxation Agreement, and a Voting Participation Agreement.

=== Americas ===
Country	Formal relations began	Notes
Antigua and Barbuda	28 October 1985	Denmark has a consulate in Saint John.
Argentina	20 January 1841	See Argentina–Denmark relations: Argentina has an embassy in Copenhagen.; Denmark closed its embassy in Buenos Aires in July 2022.
Bahamas	June 1991	Denmark is represented in Bahamas, through its embassy in Mexico, Denmark has a consulate in Nassau.
Barbados	20 August 1979	Denmark is represented in Barbados, through its embassy in Mexico City.; Barbados is represented in Denmark, through its embassy in Brussels.
Belize	15 November 1991	Denmark is represented in Belize, through its embassy in Nicaragua.
Bolivia	29 December 1926	See Bolivia–Denmark relations: Bolivia is accredited to Denmark from its embassy in Berlin, Germany.; Denmark is accredited to Bolivia from its embassy in Bogotá, Colombia.
Brazil	26 April 1828	See Brazil–Denmark relations: Brazil has an embassy in Copenhagen.; Denmark has an embassy in Brasília.
Canada	5 December 1945	See Canada–Denmark relations: Canada has an embassy in Copenhagen.; Denmark has an embassy in Ottawa.
Chile	23 April 1925	See Chile–Denmark relations: Chile has an embassy in Copenhagen.; Denmark has an embassy in Santiago.
Colombia	18 May 1935	See Colombia–Denmark relations: Colombia is represented in Denmark, through its embassy in Stockholm.; Denmark has an embassy in Bogotá.
Costa Rica	3 October 1947	Costa Rica has one consulate general in Copenhagen.; Denmark has one consulate general in San José.
Cuba	29 June 1911	Cuba has an embassy in Copenhagen.; Denmark have a consulate general in Havana.
Dominica	20 February 2019	Denmark is represented in Dominica, through its embassy in Mexico.
Dominican Republic	17 December 1851	Denmark is represented in the Dominican Republic, through its embassy in Mexico.; Dominican Republic is represented in Denmark, through its embassy in Stockholm.
Ecuador	22 September 1948	Denmark has a consulate general in Quito.
El Salvador	20 October 1947	Denmark has a consulate in San Salvador.; A treaty of Commerce and Navigation was signed on 9 July 1958.
Grenada	6 November 2018	Denmark is represented in Grenada, through its embassy in Mexico.; Grenada is represented in Denmark, through its embassy in Brussels.
Guatemala	30 April 1880	Denmark has a consulate general in Guatemala City.
Guyana	16 November 1979	Denmark is represented in Guyana, through its embassy in Brasília.; Guyana is represented in Denmark, through its embassy in Brussels.
Haiti	12 August 1947	Denmark is represented in Haiti, through its embassy in Mexico.; Haiti is represented in Denmark, through its embassy in Berlin.
Honduras	19 April 1946	Denmark have a consulate general in Tegucigalpa.; Honduras is represented in Denmark, through its embassy in Stockholm.
Jamaica	14 October 1974	Denmark is represented in Jamaica, through its embassy in Mexico.; Jamaica is represented in Denmark, through its embassy in London.
Mexico	19 July 1827	See Denmark–Mexico relations: Mexico has an embassy in Copenhagen.; Denmark has an embassy in Mexico City.
Nicaragua	1 May 1947	See Denmark–Nicaragua relations: Denmark has an embassy in Managua.; Nicaragua has an embassy in Copenhagen.
Panama	30 June 1937	Denmark have a consulate general in Ciudad de Panamá, and in Colón.; Panama is represented in Denmark, through its embassy in Stockholm.
Paraguay	1 December 1953	Paraguay is represented in Denmark, through its embassy in Stockholm.; Denmark is represented in Paraguay, through its embassy in Buenos Aires.; Denmark also has an honorary consulate in Asunción.
Peru	22 July 1921	Peru is represented in Denmark, through its embassy in Berlin.; Denmark has a consulate general in Lima.
Saint Kitts and Nevis	None	Denmark is represented in St. Kitts and Nevis, through its embassy in Washington D.C.
Saint Lucia	20 December 1982	Denmark is represented in St. Lucia, through its embassy in Mexico.
Saint Vincent and the Grenadines	19 September 1985	Denmark is represented in St. Vincent and the Grenadines, through its embassy in Mexico.
Suriname	27 November 1980	Denmark is represented in Suriname, through its embassy in Brasília.; Denmark have a consulate in Paramaribo.
Trinidad and Tobago	23 May 1972	Denmark is represented in Trinidad and Tobago, through its embassy in Mexico.; Denmark have a consulate general in Port of Spain.
United States	12 October 1801	See Denmark–United States relations Embassy of Denmark, Washington, D.C. Embassy of the United States, Copenhagen: Denmark recognized the United States in 1792.; Denmark has an embassy in Washington D.C. and consulates-general in Chicago, Houston, New York City and Palo Alto.; United States has an embassy in Copenhagen and a consulate in Nuuk, Greenland.
Uruguay	28 February 1842	Denmark is accredited to Uruguay from its embassy in Buenos Aires, Argentina.; Uruguay is accredited to Denmark from its embassy in Stockholm, Sweden.
Venezuela	26 March 1835	See Denmark–Venezuela relations: Venezuela is accredited to Denmark from its embassy in Oslo, Norway.; Denmark is accredited to Venezuela from its embassy in Brasília, Brazil.

=== Middle East ===
Country	Formal relations began	Notes
Bahrain	10 August 1974	Denmark is represented in Bahrain, through its embassy in Riyadh. Denmark also has a Royal Consular Agency in Manama.; Bahrain is represented in Denmark, through its embassy in London.
Egypt	1 June 1922	See Denmark–Egypt relations: Denmark has an embassy in Cairo.; Egypt has an embassy in Copenhagen.
Iran	3 February 1922	See Denmark–Iran relations: Denmark has an embassy in Tehran.; Iran has an embassy in Copenhagen.; "Encyclopedia Iranica on Iran-Denmark historical relations".
Iraq	3 November 1953	See Denmark–Iraq relations: Denmark has an embassy in Baghdad.; Iraq has an embassy in Copenhagen.
Israel	12 July 1950	See Denmark–Israel relations: Denmark has an embassy in Tel Aviv.; Israel has an embassy in Copenhagen.
Jordan	7 December 1961	Denmark is represented in Jordan, through its embassy in Damascus.; Jordan is represented in Denmark, through its embassy in Berlin.
Kuwait	25 April 1964	Denmark is represented in Kuwait, through its embassy in Riyadh.; Kuwait is represented in Denmark, through its embassy in Stockholm.
Lebanon	6 October 1953	Denmark has an embassy in Beirut.; Lebanon is represented in Denmark through its embassy in Stockholm.
Oman	10 April 1976	Denmark is represented in Oman, through its embassy in Riyadh.; Oman is represented in Denmark, through its embassy in Berlin.
State of Palestine	None	See Denmark–Palestine relations: Denmark has a representative office in Ramallah.; Palestine has a mission in Copenhagen.
Qatar	15 December 1974	Denmark is represented in Qatar, through its embassy in the United Arab Emirates.; Qatar is represented in Denmark, through its embassy in the Hague.
Saudi Arabia	1 February 1975	See Denmark–Saudi Arabia relations: Denmark has an embassy in Riyadh.; Saudi Arabia has an embassy in Copenhagen.
Syria	10 December 1953	See Denmark–Syria relations: Denmark has an embassy in Damascus.; Syria is represented in Denmark, through its embassy in Stockholm.
Turkey (Note: Turkey is physiographically considered a transcontinental country in Western Asia and Eastern Europe.)	26 January 1925	See Denmark–Turkey relations: Denmark has an embassy in Ankara and a consulate general in Istanbul.; Turkey has an embassy in Copenhagen.; Both countries are full members of NATO.; Denmark is an EU member and Turkey is an EU candidate. Denmark opposes Turkey's accession negotiations to the EU, although negotiations have now been suspended.
United Arab Emirates	18 January 1975	See Denmark–United Arab Emirates relations: Denmark has an embassy in Abu Dhabi, and a consulate general in Dubai.; The United Arab Emirates is represented in Denmark, through its embassy in Stockholm.
Yemen	1 May 1975	Denmark is represented in Yemen, through its embassy in Riyadh.; Yemen is represented in Denmark, through its embassy in Berlin.

=== Asia ===
Country	Formal relations began	Notes
Afghanistan	26 January 1966	See Afghanistan–Denmark relations: Denmark has an embassy in Kabul.; Afghanistan is represented in Denmark, through its embassy in Oslo.
Bangladesh	4 February 1972	See Bangladesh–Denmark relations: Denmark has an embassy in Dhaka.; Bangladesh is represented in Denmark, through its embassy in Stockholm.
Bhutan	13 August 1985	See Bhutan–Denmark relations: Denmark has a representative office in Thimphu.; Bhutan is represented in Denmark, through its embassy in Brussels.
Brunei	24 January 1985	Denmark is represented in Brunei, through its embassy in Singapore.; Brunei is represented in Denmark through a non-resident ambassador based in Bandar Seri Begawan.
Cambodia	29 February 1956	See Cambodia–Denmark relations: Denmark is represented in Cambodia, through its embassy in Bangkok, Thailand.; Cambodia is represented in Denmark, through its embassy in London.
China	11 May 1950	See People's Republic of China–Denmark relations: Denmark has an embassy in Beijing.; China has an embassy in Copenhagen.
East Timor	12 February 2003	Denmark is represented in East Timor, through its embassy in Jakarta.; East Timor is represented in Denmark, through its embassy in Brussels.
India	10 September 1949	See Denmark–India relations: Denmark has an embassy in New Delhi.; India has an embassy in Copenhagen.
Indonesia	15 February 1950	See Denmark–Indonesia relations: Denmark has an embassy in Jakarta.; Indonesia has an embassy in Copenhagen.
Japan	16 December 1867	See Denmark–Japan relations: Denmark has an embassy in Tokyo.; Japan has an embassy in Copenhagen.; "Japan-Denmark Relations".
Kazakhstan	7 May 1992	See Denmark–Kazakhstan relations: Denmark is represented in Kazakhstan, through its embassy in Moscow.; Kazakhstan is represented in Denmark, through its embassy in Berlin.
Kyrgyzstan	8 May 1992	Denmark is represented in Kyrgyzstan, through its embassy in Moscow.
Laos	1 November 1956	Denmark is represented in Laos, through its embassy in Hanoi.; Laos is represented in Denmark, through its embassy in Stockholm.
Malaysia	31 August 1957	See Denmark–Malaysia relations: Denmark has an embassy in Kuala Lumpur.; Malaysia is represented in Denmark, through its embassy in Stockholm.
Maldives	8 November 1982	Denmark is represented in Maldives, through its embassy in New Delhi.; Maldives is represented in Denmark, through its embassy in London.
Mongolia	5 August 1968	Denmark has a consulate general in Ulaanbaatar.; Mongolia is represented in Denmark, through its embassy in Stockholm.
Myanmar	22 April 1955	See Burma–Denmark relations: Denmark is represented in Burma, through its embassy in Bangkok.; Burma is represented in Denmark, through its embassy in London.
Nepal	15 December 1967	See Denmark–Nepal relations: Denmark has an embassy in Kathmandu.; Nepal has an embassy in Copenhagen.
North Korea	17 July 1973	See Denmark–North Korea relations: Denmark is represented in North Korea, through its embassy in Beijing.; North Korea is represented in Denmark, through its embassy in Stockholm.
Pakistan	13 October 1949	See Denmark–Pakistan relations: Denmark has an embassy in Islamabad.; Pakistan has an embassy in Copenhagen.; Roughly 20,000 Pakistanis live and work in Denmark, making them the country's fifth-largest non-Western community. Six Pakistani immigrants/descendants of immigrants have seats on local parliaments and councils, the second-highest number of any immigrant group.
Philippines	28 September 1946	See Denmark–Philippines relations: Denmark has an embassy in Manila.; The Republic of the Philippines has an embassy in Copenhagen.
Singapore	28 September 1965	Denmark has an embassy in Singapore City.; Singapore is represented in Denmark, through a non-resident ambassador based in Singapore.
South Korea	11 March 1959	See Denmark–South Korea relations: Both nations are having an agreement of work and holiday program thus citizens of both countries can live, work, study and travel for up to a year and there are no quotas for Danish and South Koreans working and traveling in the each other.; Royal Danish embassy in Seoul.; South Korean embassy in Copenhagen.
Sri Lanka	5 January 1953	See Denmark–Sri Lanka relations: Denmark has a consulate general in Colombo.; Sri Lanka is represented in Denmark, through its embassy in Stockholm.
Tajikistan	21 January 1992	Denmark is represented in Tajikistan, through its embassy in Moscow.
Taiwan	None	See Denmark–Taiwan relations: Denmark has a trade council in Taipei.; Taiwan has a Representative Office in Copenhagen.
Thailand	21 May 1858	See Denmark–Thailand relations: Denmark has an embassy in Bangkok.; Thailand has an embassy in Copenhagen.
Turkmenistan	21 January 1992	Denmark is represented in Turkmenistan, through its embassy in Moscow.
Uzbekistan	25 January 1992	Uzbekistan is represented in Denmark, through its embassy in Moscow.; Denmark is represented in Uzbekistan, through its embassy in Moscow.
Vietnam	25 November 1971	See Denmark–Vietnam relations: Denmark has an embassy in Hanoi.; Vietnam has an embassy in Copenhagen.

=== Africa ===
Country	Formal relations began	Notes
Algeria	3 September 1963	Denmark has an embassy in Algiers.; Algeria has an embassy in Copenhagen.
Angola	16 September 1976	Denmark is represented in Angola, through its embassy in Lusaka.; Angola is represented in Denmark, through its embassy in Stockholm.
Benin	15 December 1964	See Benin–Denmark relations: Benin has an embassy in Copenhagen.; Denmark has an embassy in Cotonou.
Botswana	18 April 1968	Denmark is represented in Botswana, through its embassy in Pretoria.; Botswana is represented in Denmark, through its embassy in Stockholm.
Burkina Faso	21 January 1981	See Burkina Faso–Denmark relations: Denmark has an embassy in Ouagadougou.; Burkina Faso has an embassy in Copenhagen.
Burundi	25 June 1965	Denmark is represented in Burundi, through its embassy in Kampala.; Burundi is represented in Denmark, through its embassy in Berlin.
Cameroon	1960	Denmark has a consulate general in Yaoundé.; Cameroon is represented in Denmark, through its embassy in London.
Cape Verde	17 February 2011	Denmark is represented in Cape Verde, through its embassy in Lisbon.
Central African Republic	18 March 2025	Denmark is represented in the Central African Republic, through its embassy in Ouagadougou.; The Central African Republic is represented in Denmark, through its embassy in Brussels.
Chad	23 October 1998	Chad has a consulate in Copenhagen, Denmark.; Denmark is represented in Chad, through its embassy in Burkina Faso.
Comoros	1 December 1981	Denmark is represented in Comoros, through its embassy in Dar es Salaam.
Republic of the Congo	10 June 1967	Denmark is represented in Republic of Congo, through its embassy in Cotonou.
Democratic Republic of the Congo	3 August 1962	Denmark is represented in the Democratic Republic of the Congo, through its embassy in Pretoria.
Djibouti	10 December 2002	Denmark have a consulate in Djibouti City.
Equatorial Guinea	7 November 2014	Denmark is represented in Equatorial Guinea, through its embassy in Pretoria.
Eritrea	28 September 1993	See Denmark–Eritrea relations Eritrea was a Danish programme country from 1993 to 1996, and again from 1999 to 2001. In 1996, Denmark assisted 112 million DKK to the agriculture sector, and 80 million DKK to the education sector. Relations between Eritrea and Denmark have been bad, since Denmark decided to suspend development cooperation with Eritrea in January 2002, and completely closed its embassy in Eritrea in June 2002.: Denmark is represented in Eritrea through its embassy in Nairobi.
Eswatini	4 February 1997	Denmark has a consulate in Mbabane.
Ethiopia	21 February 1950	See Denmark–Ethiopia relations: Denmark has an embassy in Addis Ababa.; Ethiopia is represented in Denmark, through its embassy in London.
Gabon	22 February 1966	Denmark have a consulate in Libreville.; Gabon is represented in Denmark, through its embassy in London.
Gambia	January 1979	Denmark is represented in Gambia, through its embassy in Bamako.; Gambia is represented in Denmark, through its embassy in London.
Ghana	28 September 1961	See Denmark–Ghana relations: Denmark has an embassy in Accra.; Ghana has an embassy in Copenhagen.
Guinea	1 December 1961	Denmark is represented in Guinea, through its embassy in Accra.; Guinea is represented in Denmark, through its embassy in Berlin.
Guinea-Bissau	26 May 1983	Denmark is represented in Guinea Bissau, through its embassy in Lisbon.; Guinea-Bissau is represented in Denmark, through its embassy in Brussels.
Ivory Coast	28 November 1964	Denmark is represented in Côte d'Ivoire, through its embassy in Accra.; Denmark have a consulate general in Abidjan.; Côte d'Ivoire have an embassy in Copenhagen.
Kenya	23 October 1964	See Denmark–Kenya relations: Denmark has an embassy in Nairobi.; Kenya is represented in Denmark, through its embassy in Stockholm.
Lesotho	21 January 1976	Denmark have a consulate in Maseru.
Liberia	11 July 1963	Denmark is represented in Liberia, through its embassy in Accra.; Liberia is represented in Denmark, through its embassy in Berlin.
Libya	17 October 1961	See Denmark–Libya relations: Libya closed its embassy in Copenhagen, as a protest against the Jyllandsposten cartoons controversy, in 2006.
Madagascar	1964	Denmark is represented in Madagascar, through its embassy in Pretoria.; Denmark have a consulate in Antananarivo.
Malawi	22 February 1966	Denmark is represented in Malawi, through its embassy in Maputo.; Malawi is represented in Denmark, through its embassy in London.
Mali	10 April 2004	Denmark has an embassy in Bamako.; From 2006 to 2011, Denmark assisted Mali with 800 million DKK for poverty reduction.
Mauritania	19 April 1975	Denmark is represented in Mauritania, through its embassy in Rabat.; Mauritania is represented in Denmark, through its embassy in Brussels.
Mauritius	2 March 1973	Denmark have a consulate in Port Louis.
Morocco	29 November 1957	See Denmark–Morocco relations: Denmark has an embassy in Rabat.; Morocco has an embassy in Copenhagen.
Mozambique	25 June 1975	See Denmark–Mozambique relations
Namibia	21 March 1990	Denmark is represented in Namibia, through its embassy in Pretoria.; Namibia is represented in Denmark, through its embassy in Stockholm.
Niger	25 May 1965	Denmark is represented in Niger, through its embassy in Ouagadougou.
Nigeria	15 February 1962	See Foreign relations of Nigeria
Rwanda	2 April 1963	Denmark is represented in Rwanda, through its embassy in Kampala.; Rwanda is represented in Denmark, through its embassy in Stockholm.
Sahrawi Arab Democratic Republic	None	Sahrawi Arab Democratic Republic has a representative office in Copenhagen.
São Tomé and Príncipe	20 February 2019	Denmark is represented in São Tomé and Príncipe, through its embassy in Lisbon.; São Tomé and Príncipe is represented in Denmark, through its embassy in Brussels.
Senegal	16 May 1961	Denmark have a consulate general in Dakar.
Seychelles	27 November 1979	Denmark has a consulate in Victoria, Seychelles.
Sierra Leone	22 January 1973	Denmark has a consulate in Freetown.
Somalia	9 July 1960	See Denmark–Somalia relations: Denmark has a consulate general in Mogadishu.
South Africa	4 May 1946	See Denmark–South Africa relations: Denmark has an embassy in Pretoria.
South Sudan	4 May 2012	
Sudan	8 May 1958	See Denmark–Sudan relations: Denmark is represented in Sudan, through its embassy in Addis Ababa, Ethiopia.; Sudan is represented in Denmark, through its embassy in Oslo, Norway.
Tanzania	8 December 1964	See Denmark–Tanzania relations
Tunisia	1 September 1959	See Foreign relations of Tunisia
Togo	21 June 1968	Denmark is represented in Togo, through its embassy in Cotonou.
Uganda	26 January 1965	Uganda has an embassy in Copenhagen.
Zambia	10 February 1965	See Denmark–Zambia relations
Zimbabwe	18 April 1980	See Foreign relations of Zimbabwe

=== Oceania ===
Country	Formal relations began	Notes
Australia	12 September 1947	See Australia–Denmark relations: Australia has an embassy in Copenhagen.; Denmark has an embassy in Canberra and a consulate general in Sydney.
Cook Islands	None	Denmark is represented in Cook Islands, through its embassy in Canberra.
Fiji	1 December 1997	Denmark is represented in Fiji, through its embassy in Jakarta.; Fiji is represented in Denmark, through its high commission in London.; Further details Denmark–Fiji relations refers to the current and historical relations between Denmark and Fiji. Denmark is represented in Fiji through its embassy in Jakarta, Indonesia. Fiji is represented in Denmark through its High Commission in London. Denmark has an honorary consulate and a consulate in Suva, the capital of Fiji. The current Fijian ambassador to Denmark is Solo Mara. In 1971, an abolition of visas agreement was signed between Denmark and Fiji. In October 1974, Denmark and Fiji signed an avoidance of double taxation agreement. In November 2003, the Danish ambassador to Fiji Geert Aagaard Andersen said that Denmark supports the European Union's decision to resume development cooperation with Fiji and that Denmark is pleased with the reestablishing democracy progress in Fiji. Trade between Denmark and Fiji showed a potential increase he said. For the 2009 United Nations Climate Change Conference meeting in Copenhagen, the Fijian Prime Minister Frank Bainimarama stressed that: "We in Fiji experienced unprecedented floods in February of this year. The enormous devastation caused by such disasters not only results in commercial and economic hardships but has a deleterious effect on food production, the ill effects of climate change can still be minimised." In July 2011, Danish export to Fiji amounted approximately 1 million DKK while Fijian export were about 100.000 DKK.
Kiribati		Denmark is represented in Kiribati, through its embassy in Singapore.
Marshall Islands	17 September 1992	Denmark is represented in Marshall Islands, through its embassy in Singapore.
Micronesia, Federated States of	29 August 2018	Denmark is represented in Micronesia, through its embassy in Singapore.
Nauru	None	Denmark is represented in Nauru, through its embassy in Canberra.
New Zealand	12 September 1947	See Denmark–New Zealand relations: Denmark is accredited to New Zealand from its embassy in Canberra, Australia.; New Zealand is accredited to Denmark from its embassy in Stockholm, Sweden.
Palau	30 November 2018	Denmark is represented in Palau, through its embassy in Singapore.
Papua New Guinea	February 1978	Denmark is represented in Papua New Guinea, through its embassy in Jakarta.; Papua New Guinea is represented in Denmark, through its embassy in Brussels.
Samoa		Denmark is represented in Samoa, through its embassy in Canberra.
Solomon Islands	None	Denmark is represented in the Solomon Islands, through its embassy in Singapore.
Tonga	31 October 1985	Denmark is represented in Tonga, through its embassy in Canberra.
Tuvalu	None	Denmark is represented in Tuvalu, through its embassy in Canberra.
Vanuatu	25 October 2018	Denmark is represented in Vanuatu, through its embassy in Canberra.

== See also ==
Politics of Denmark

- History of Denmark
- Denmark–Soviet Union relations
- Politics of Denmark
  - Politics of the Faroe Islands
  - Politics of Greenland
- Denmark and the European Union
  - Danish European Union opt-outs referendum
- Faroe Islands–United Kingdom relations
- Scandinavian defense union
- List of diplomatic missions of Denmark
- List of diplomatic missions in Denmark
- Visa requirements for Danish citizens
- Foreign relations of Greenland
- List of ambassadors of Denmark
