= Australia–Denmark relations =

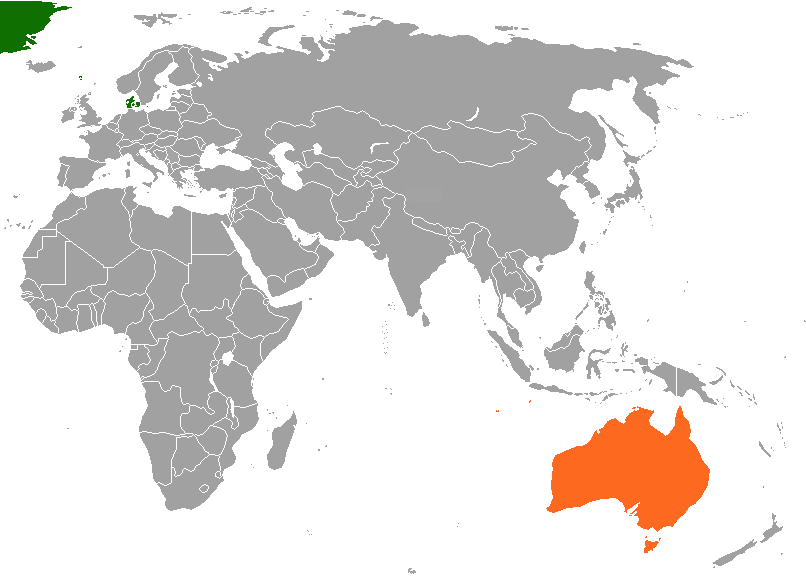

- Denmark: Australia

Current and historical relations exist between Australia and Denmark. Australia has an embassy in Copenhagen, and Denmark has an embassy in Canberra.

== History ==
In the 1890s, there was no trade between Australia and Denmark, so in the 1920s, the Danes in Australia formed the Danish-Australian Chamber of Commerce to import products from Denmark such as Tuborg, Junket and Hirschsprung cigars. On 1 May 1952, an agreement on visas was signed in Canberra.

In the 1980s, after the visit of Uffe Ellemann-Jensen to Australia, the relations between Australia and Denmark were described as warm and friendly.

In 2010, both countries made a deal to ship 6,100 tons hexachlorobenzene waste from Australia to Denmark. Greenpeace protested outside the Australian environment ministry to show their opposition to the shipment of Hexachlorobenzene from Australia. On 23 December 2010, Danish Minister of Environment Karen Ellemann cancelled the deal because of the pressure.

As of 2019, the ambassador of Denmark to Australia is Tom Nørring.

== Trade ==
Monthly value of Australian merchandise exports to Denmark (A$ millions) since 1988

Monthly value of Danish merchandise exports to Australia (A$ millions) since 1988

In 2008, trade between Australia and Denmark amounted to $1,19 billion. In 2009, Danish export to Australia amounted 4,8 billion DKK and Australian export amounted 697 million DKK. In 2008, Danish investments in Australia was 6,6 billion DKK.

== Migration ==
8,000 Danes migrated to Australia after World War II. Over 50,000 Australians claim Danish ancestry.

== High-society visits ==
On 1 February 1987, Danish Queen Margrethe II visited Australia. In December 2009, during the 2009 United Nations Climate Change Conference, Australian Prime Minister Kevin Rudd visited Denmark. On 17 August 2010, then Crown Princess Mary visited Tasmania, her Australian state of origin. Queen Mary, although a Danish citizen due to her marriage to King Frederik X, was born and raised in the Australian state of Tasmania. It is this royal connection between the two countries that has had the most effect on their respective citizens' interests in their bilateral ties, particularly in Australia's media coverage of Denmark-Australian relations and Danish royalty. News on Danish royal affairs are common in Australia.

== Treaties ==
A number of Australia–Denmark bilateral treaties have been agreed between the two countries, covering extradition, trade, taxation, social security, defence and other matters.

== Resident diplomatic missions ==
- Australia has an embassy in Copenhagen.
- Denmark has an embassy in Canberra.

== See also ==
- Foreign relations of Denmark
- Foreign relations of Australia
- Danish Australians
