= Denmark–Italy relations =

Diplomatic relations between Denmark and Italy

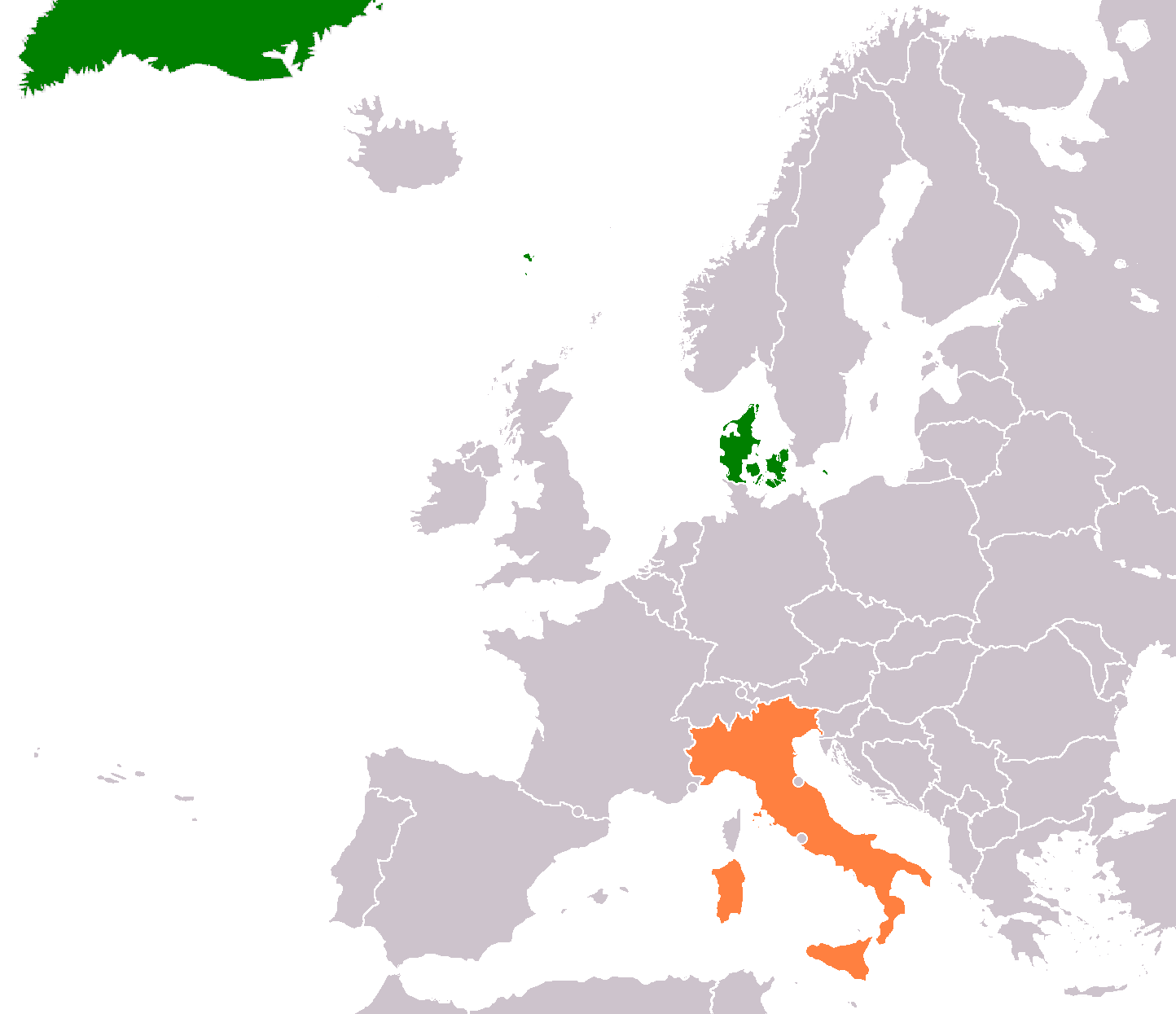
- Denmark: Italy

Diplomatic mission
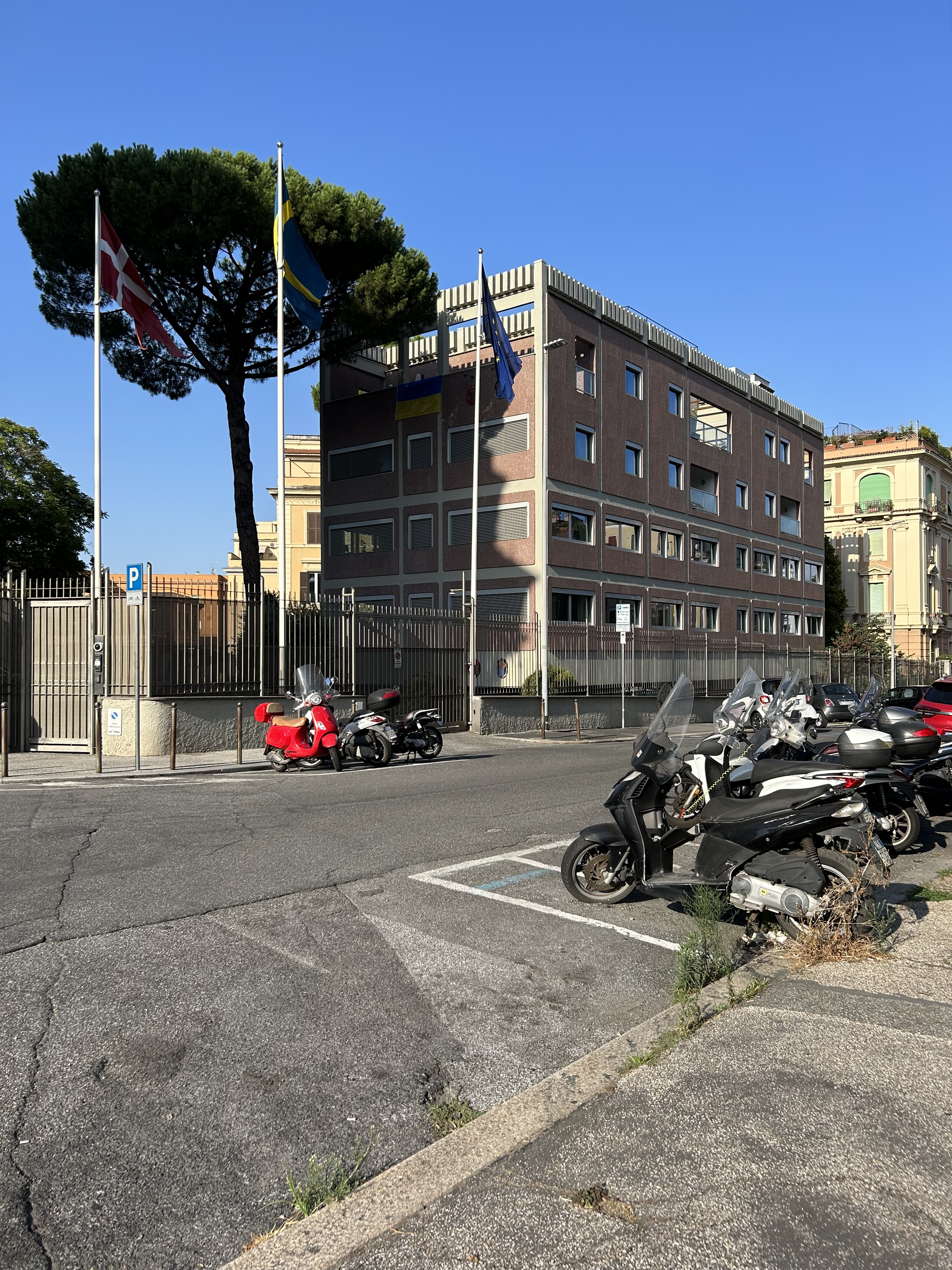
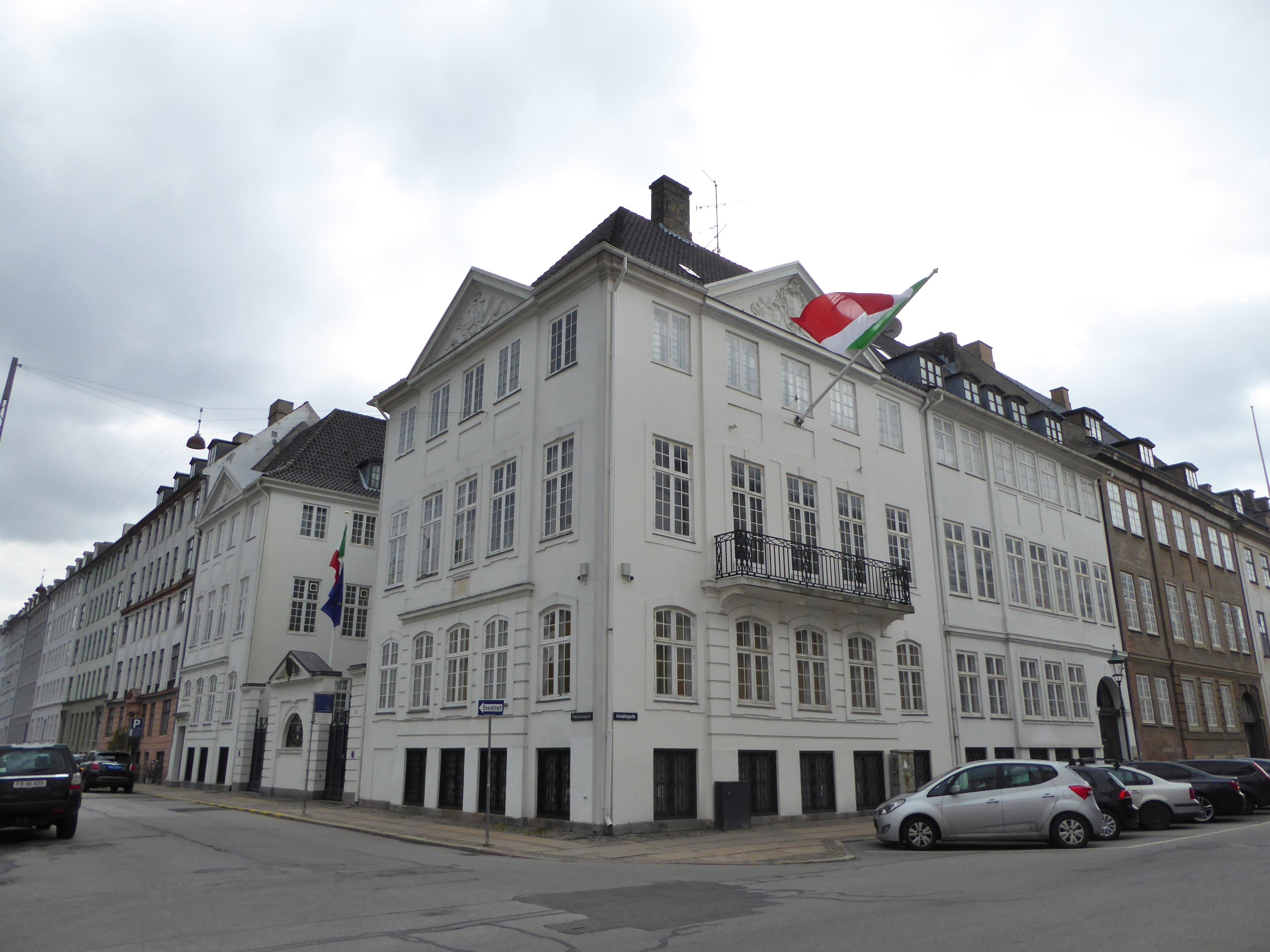
- Danish embassy in Rome: Italian embassy in Copenhagen

Denmark and Italy have maintained historical and current relations. Both countries have embassies in their respective capitals and both countries are members of the European Union and NATO.

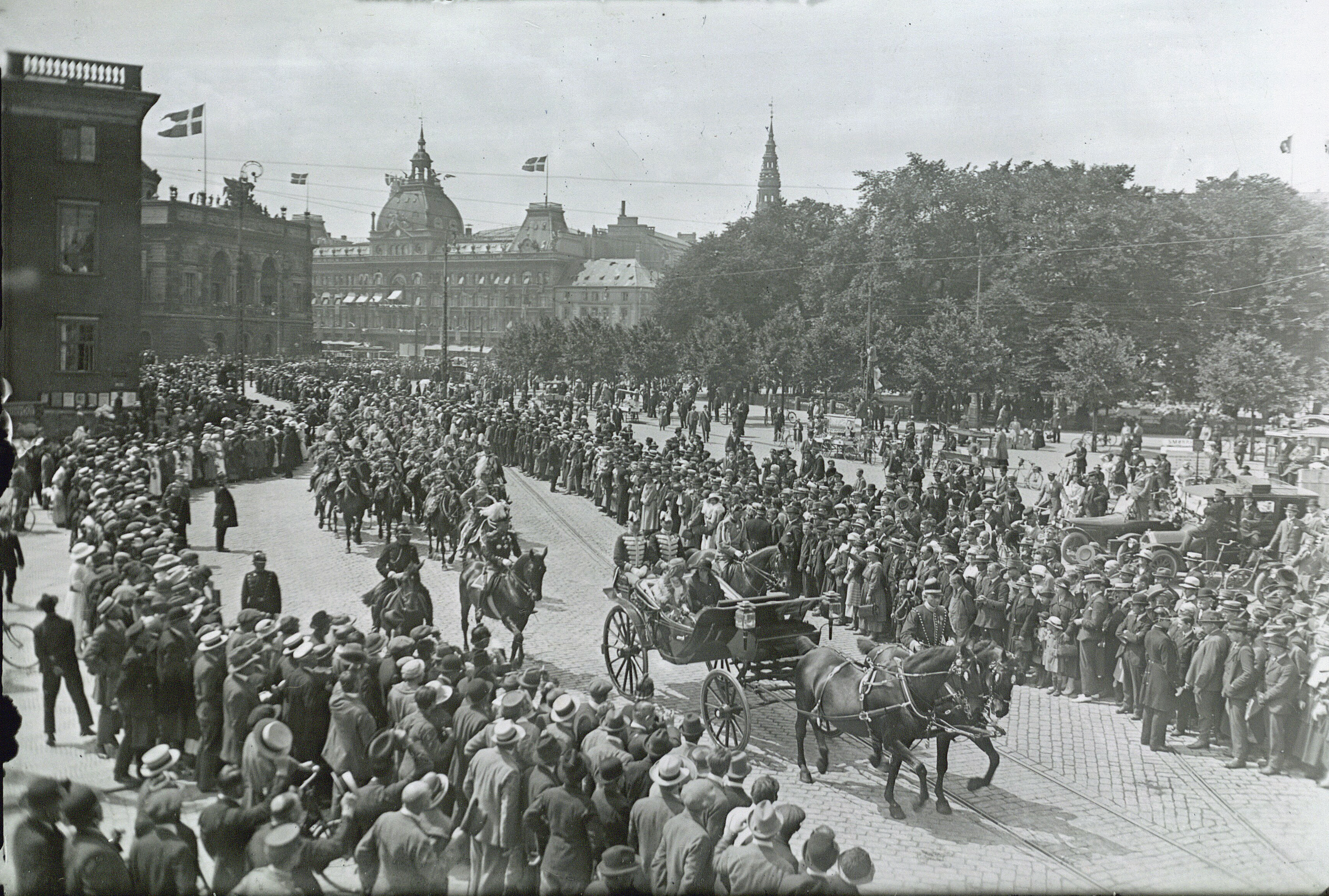
The Italian royal couple riding through Copenhagen (1922).

Diplomatic relations were established on 2 September 1861. The two countries have moreover developed close cultural exchanges since the 1960s.

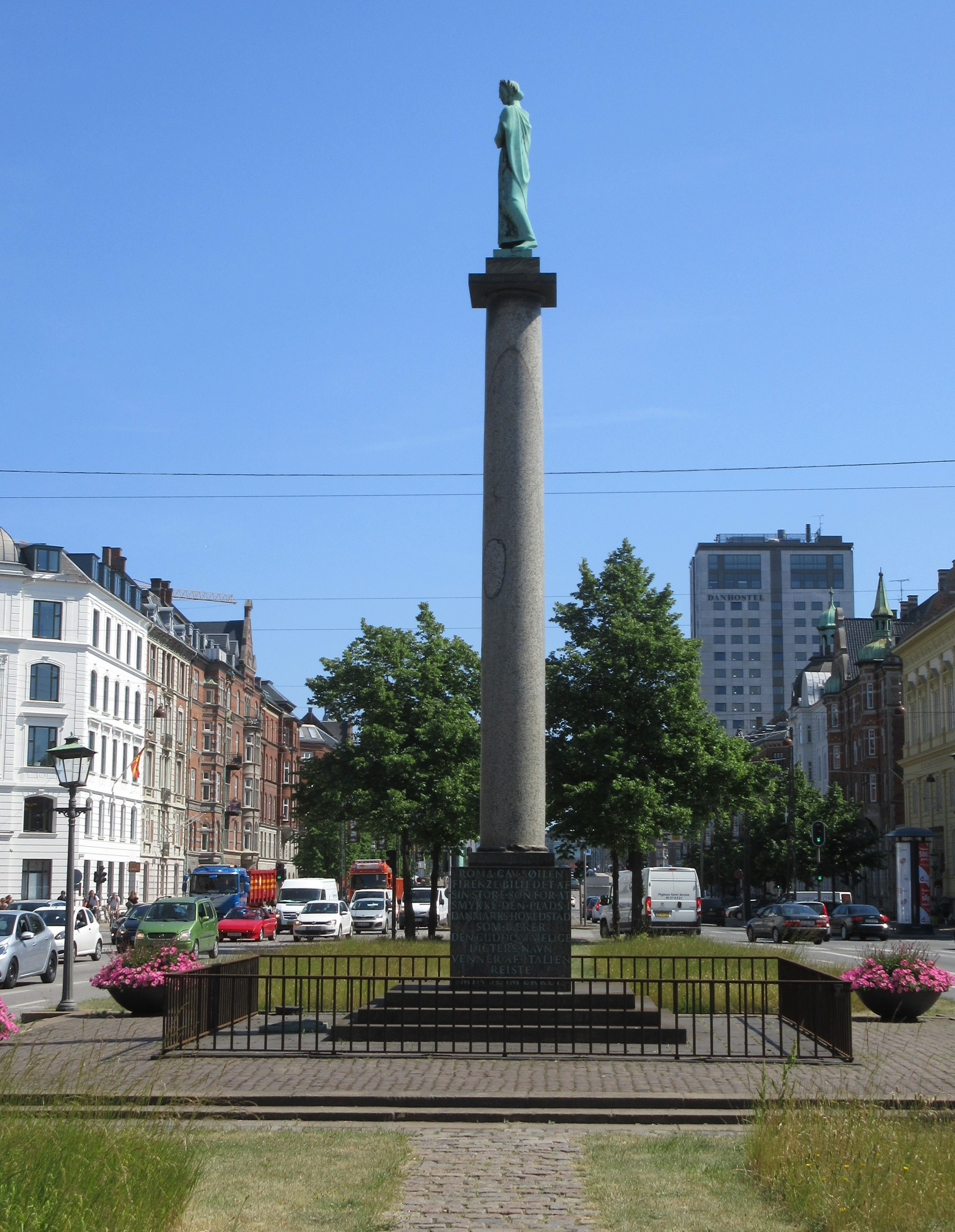
Dante Column in Copenhagen – The monument was raised in 1922 for the 600th anniversary of the death of Dante. The raise was attended by King Christian X and King Victor Emmanuel III.

== History ==
After the Unification of Italy in 17 March 1861, Italy was represented in Denmark through its diplomatic office in Stockholm, Sweden. Italian Prime Minister Cavour ordered the Italian diplomat in Sweden Marquis Migliorati to communicate to Danish king Frederick VII the assumption of Victor Emmanuel II as King of Italy. The Italian side expressed doubt on a Danish recognition of the newly established Italian state as Denmark was engaged in a dispute with Prussia pertaining to the rights over German–speaking Schleswig-Holstein. The Italian belief was therefore that Denmark could not endorse the new Italian state as it was inspired by Italian nationalism which would corroborate German claims over Schleswig-Holstein. Nonetheless, the Danish people had strong sympathy for Italy inducing the king to grant recognition.

King Frederick VII wrote a letter to king Victor Emmanuel II on 2 September 1861 in which it was stated that Denmark recognized the Kingdom of Italy and an Italian legation was established in Copenhagen. In May 1864, the two countries signed a commercial treaty to strengthen trade. The relations between the two countries were described as "good" in the treaty. An extradition agreement was signed in July 1873, while an agreement on "reciprocal relief to distressed seamen" was signed in May 1885.

== Resident diplomatic missions ==
- Denmark has an embassy in Rome.
- Italy has an embassy in Copenhagen.

== See also ==
- Foreign relations of Denmark
- Foreign relations of Italy
