= Denmark–Ethiopia relations =

- Denmark: Ethiopia

Denmark–Ethiopia relations refers to the current and historical relations between Denmark and Ethiopia. Denmark has an embassy in Addis Ababa, and Ethiopia is represented in Denmark through its embassy in London.

Diplomatic relations were established in on 5 April 1967 and Denmark provides aid and assistance to Ethiopia through the DANIDA.

In 1954, Ethiopian Emperor Haile Selassie visited Denmark on a state visit, where he received the Order of the Elephant.

== History ==
Many Danish missionaries and traders visited Ethiopia through the 20th century. Danes and other Scandinavians helped with the building of the Ethiopian Evangelical Church Mekane Yesus. In June 1935, just before the Second Italo-Abyssinian War, Denmark had stopped the shipments of arms to Ethiopia, and prevented Ethiopia from buying munitions. When the war started, Denmark lifted their ban and ended their embargo. In 1950, Denmark and 15 other countries voted for a united Eritrea and Ethiopia under Haile Selassie in the United Nations. During the 1983–1985 famine in Ethiopia, Denmark with Norway contributed a total of 27,5 million dollars.

After the Eritrean–Ethiopian War from 1998 to 2000, Denmark sent 320 soldiers to the United Nations Mission in Ethiopia and Eritrea to monitor a ceasefire in the border war.

In April 2001, Danish Foreign Minister Mogens Lykketoft visited Ethiopia and called for the strengthen of its relations with Ethiopia. Denmark opened an embassy in Ethiopia in 2004. Danish Foreign Minister Per Stig Møller and Defence Minister Søren Gade visited Addis Ababa in 2004, to meet the chairman of the African Union. In 2007, Danish Development Minister Ulla Tørnæs visited the North Wollo Zone.

== Danish assistance ==
Danish NGO DanChurchAid assisted with a budget on 17 million DKK for a soil and water conservation programme in Dire Dawa. Since 1994, Denmark assisted with 2,3 million dollars for a fuelwood plantation project in Ethiopia. From 1992 to 1994, Denmark provided 80 million DKK to Ethiopia for the reconstruction of the country. From 2004 to 2008, Denmark provided more than 140 million DKK to Ethiopia. In 2008 and 2009, the Danish aid to Ethiopia amounted 100 million DKK. During the 2011 East Africa drought in Ethiopia and neighboring countries, Denmark has contributed with 130 million DKK to the region.

== Trade ==
All imports from Ethiopia to Denmark are duty-free and quota-free, with the exception of armaments, as part of the Everything but Arms initiative of the European Union.

== See also ==
- Foreign relations of Denmark
- Foreign relations of Ethiopia
