= Denmark–Malaysia relations =

- Denmark: Malaysia

Denmark–Malaysia relations refers to the current and historical relations between Denmark and Malaysia. Denmark has closed its embassy in Kuala Lumpur, which was opened in 1968, reportedly during lack of reciprocity. Malaysia has never maintained a resident embassy in Denmark, despite considerable bilateral trade relations and substantial development assistance disbursed by Denmark. Malaysia is represented in Denmark, through its embassy in Stockholm, Sweden. Diplomatic relations were established in 1963.

== Co-operation ==
In 1990, a guarantee agreement were signed between Denmark and Malaysia. Bilateral co-operation began in 1994, with an environment programme. Later Denmark also cooperated with the private sector. Danish assistance to Malaysia was initiated as part of the Environment and Disaster Relief Facility. An agreement on financial and technical support was signed between the two countries. Both countries work together on the environmental substances. In 2008, both countries signed a Clean Development Mechanism agreement.

== Economic relations ==
Danish exports to Malaysia, amounted to 792 million DKK in 2008, while Malaysian exports amounted 1,7 million DKK. There is also a Malaysian Danish Business Council.

== See also ==
- Foreign relations of Denmark
- Foreign relations of Malaysia
- Malaysia-EU relations
- ASEAN-EU relations
