= Denmark–Japan relations =

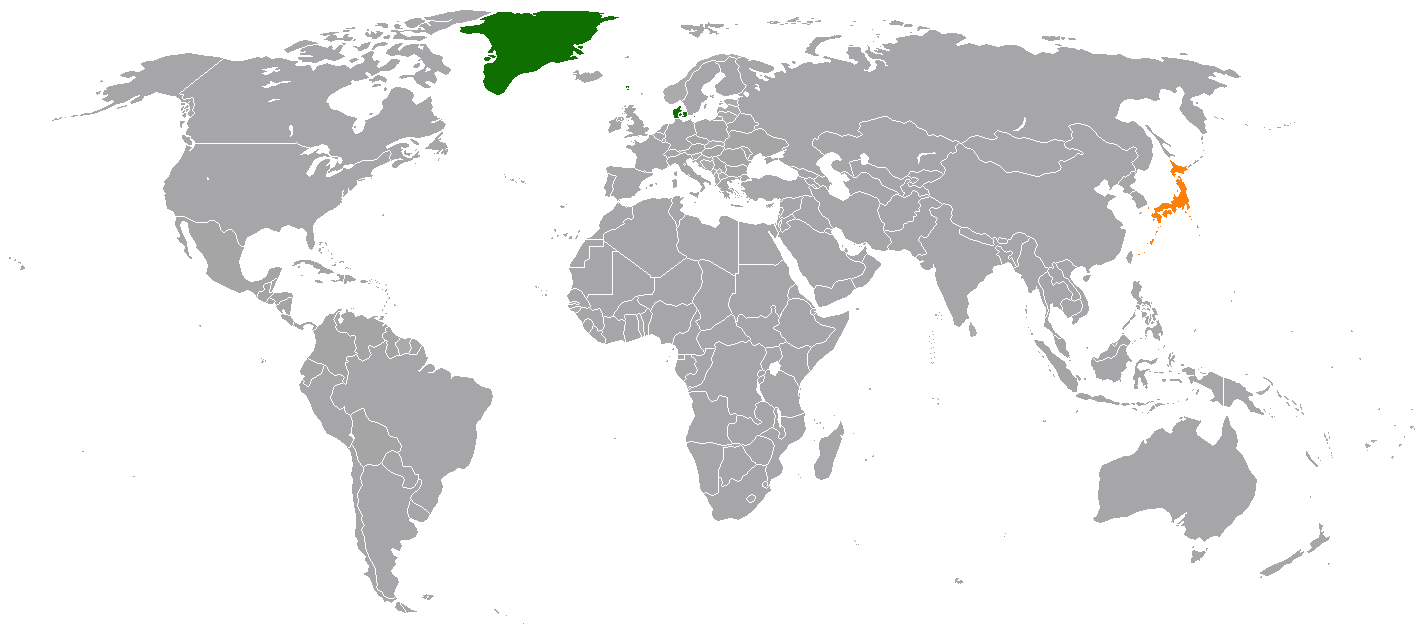
- Denmark: Japan

Denmark–Japan relations are foreign relations between Denmark and Japan. Denmark has an embassy in Tokyo, and Japan has an embassy in Copenhagen. There are 500 Danes who live in Tokyo.

== History ==
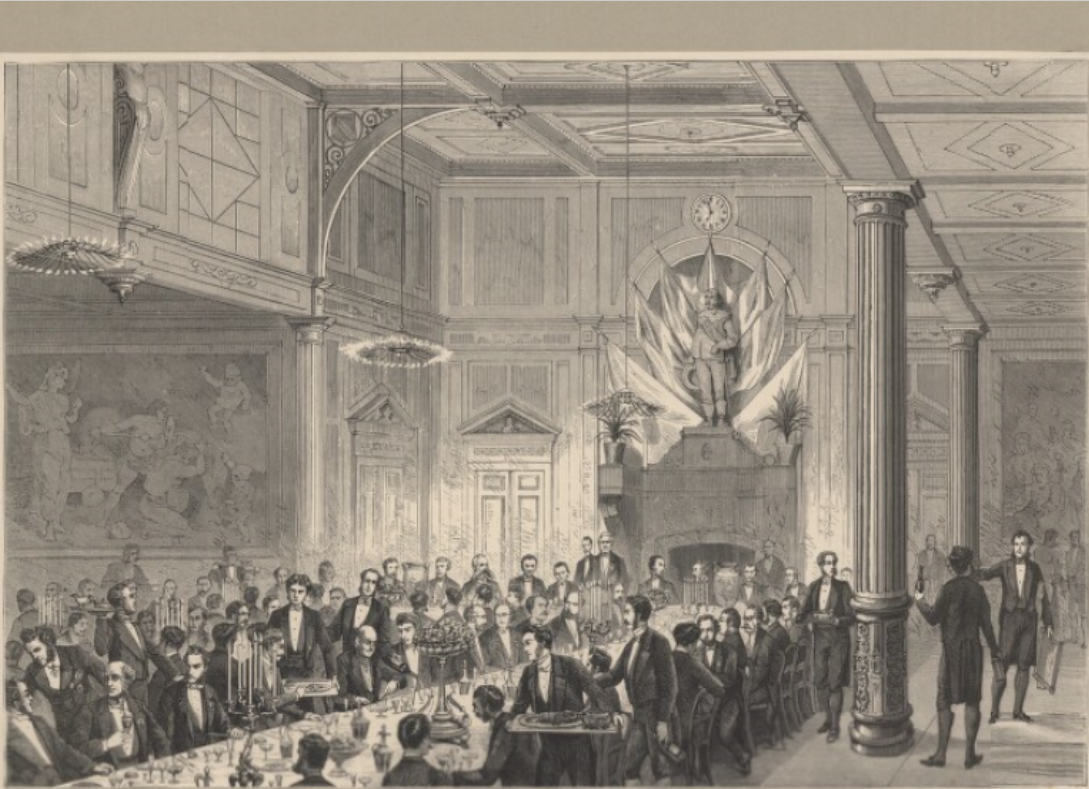
Banquest for the Japanese diplomatic mission in the Børsen Building on 20 April 1873

Diplomatic relations were established after the "Treaty of Friendship, Commerce and Navigation between Japan and Denmark" in 1867. Relations between the countries have been friendly since 1867. However, the bilateral relations were severed in the Second World War. A bilateral agreement was signed in 1952.

== Trade ==
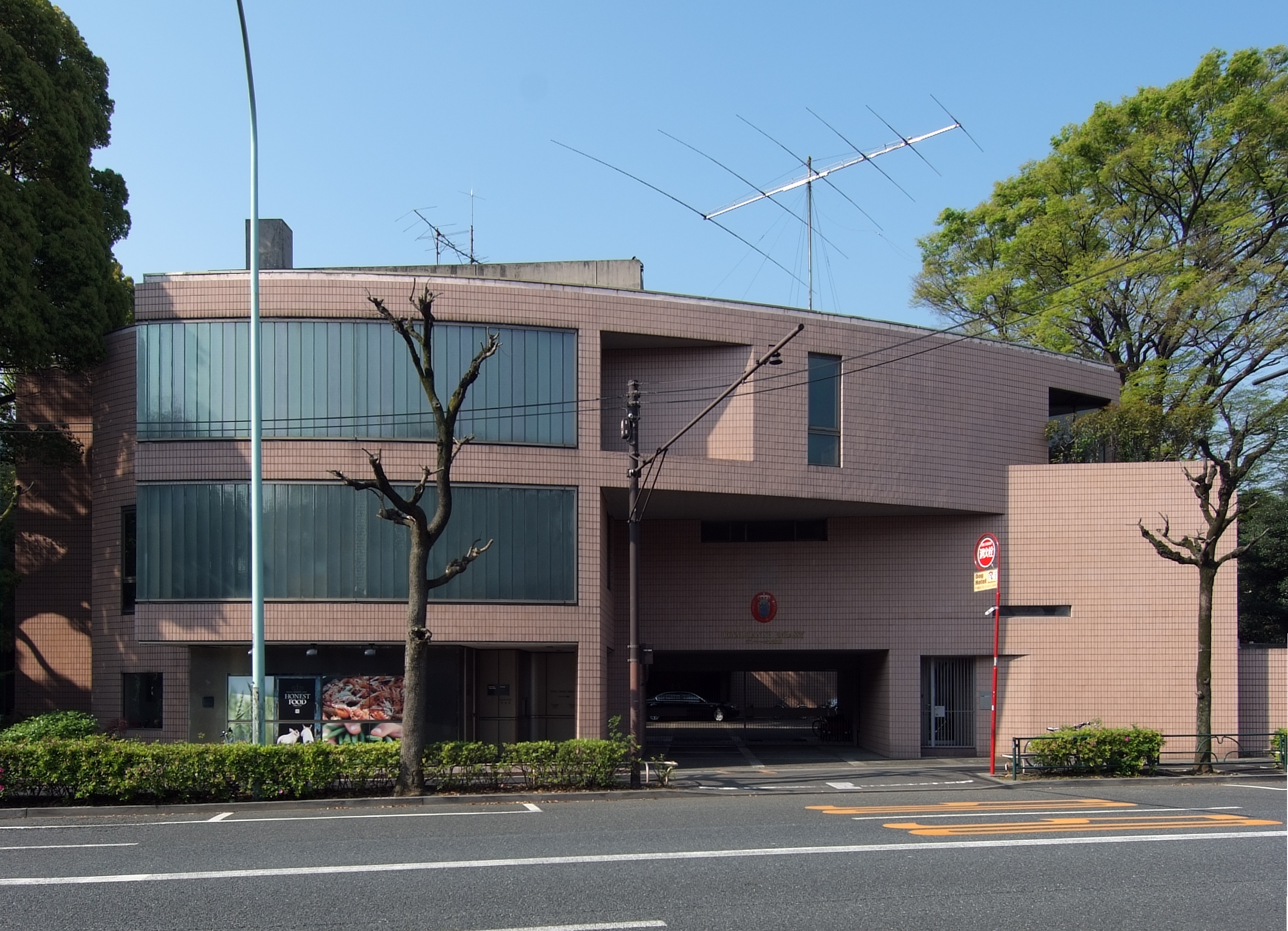
Embassy of Denmark in Japan

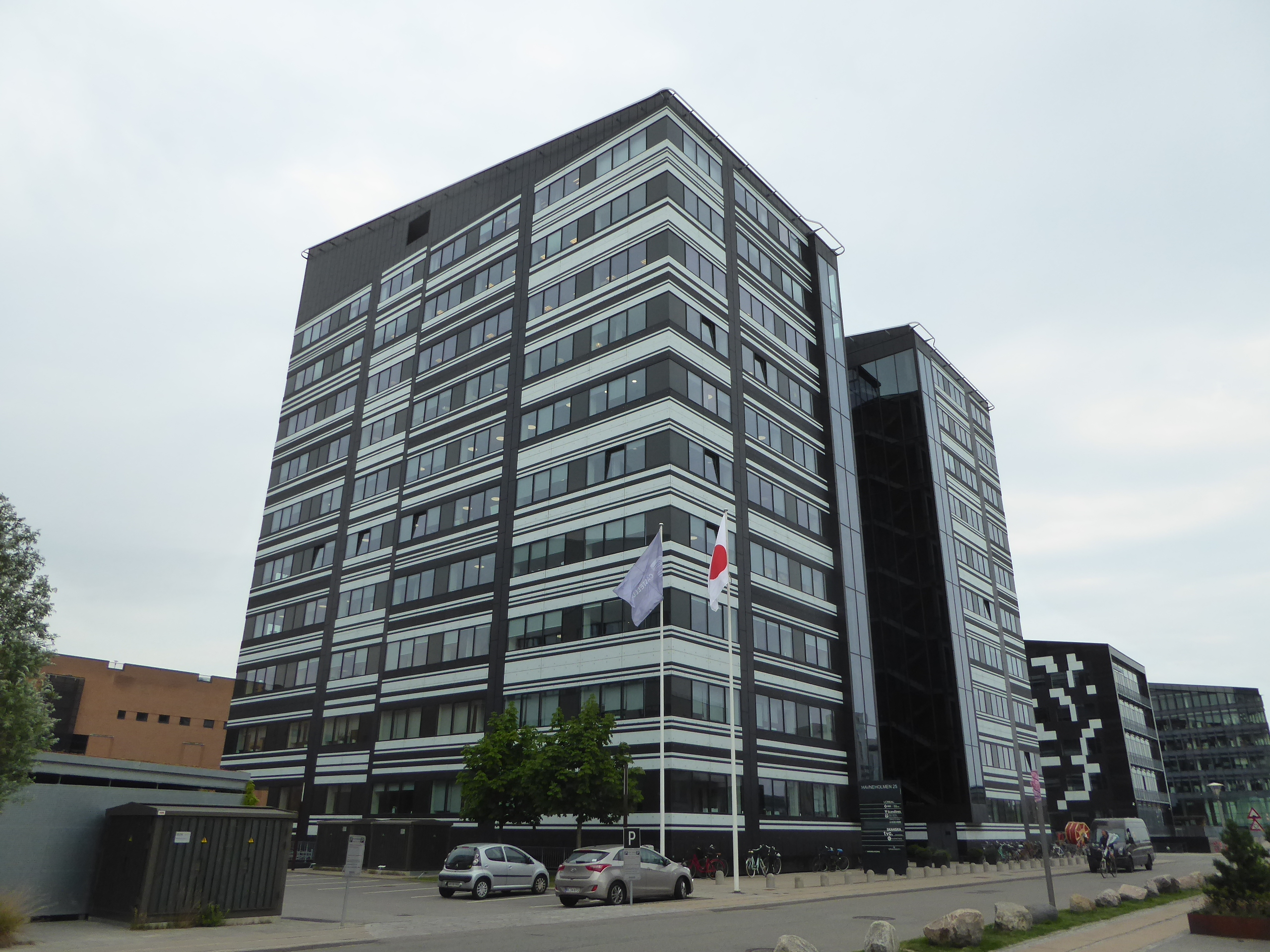
Embassy of Japan in Denmark

In 1988, the trade between Denmark and Japan reached $2 billion. The main exports from Japan are passenger cars, motorcycles, and computers. Pork, medicines, shrimp, and cheese are the main imports from Denmark. Danish investments in Japan are Lego and Novo Nordisk.

== High level visits ==
Former Prime Minister Junichiro Koizumi visited Denmark in 2002 and former Prime Minister Anders Fogh Rasmussen visited Japan in 2002 and 2006. Former Prime Minister Yukio Hatoyama made three unofficial visits to Denmark in 2009. Once in connection with Tokyo City's Olympic bid that was decided in Copenhagen that year, and twice in connection with the COP 15 UN conference on Climate Change. Danish Prime Minister Lars Løkke Rasmussen made an unofficial visit to Japan in Spring, 2009.

== Franz-Michael Skjold Mellbin ==
Franz-Michael Skjold Mellbin is a former Ambassador of Denmark to Japan. His term of appointment began September 1, 2008 and he presented his credentials to the Emperor of Japan, Akihito on November 4, 2008.

== Resident diplomatic missions ==
- Denmark has an embassy in Tokyo.
- Japan has an embassy in Copenhagen.

== See also ==
- Foreign relations of Denmark
- Foreign relations of Japan
