= Denmark–Myanmar relations =

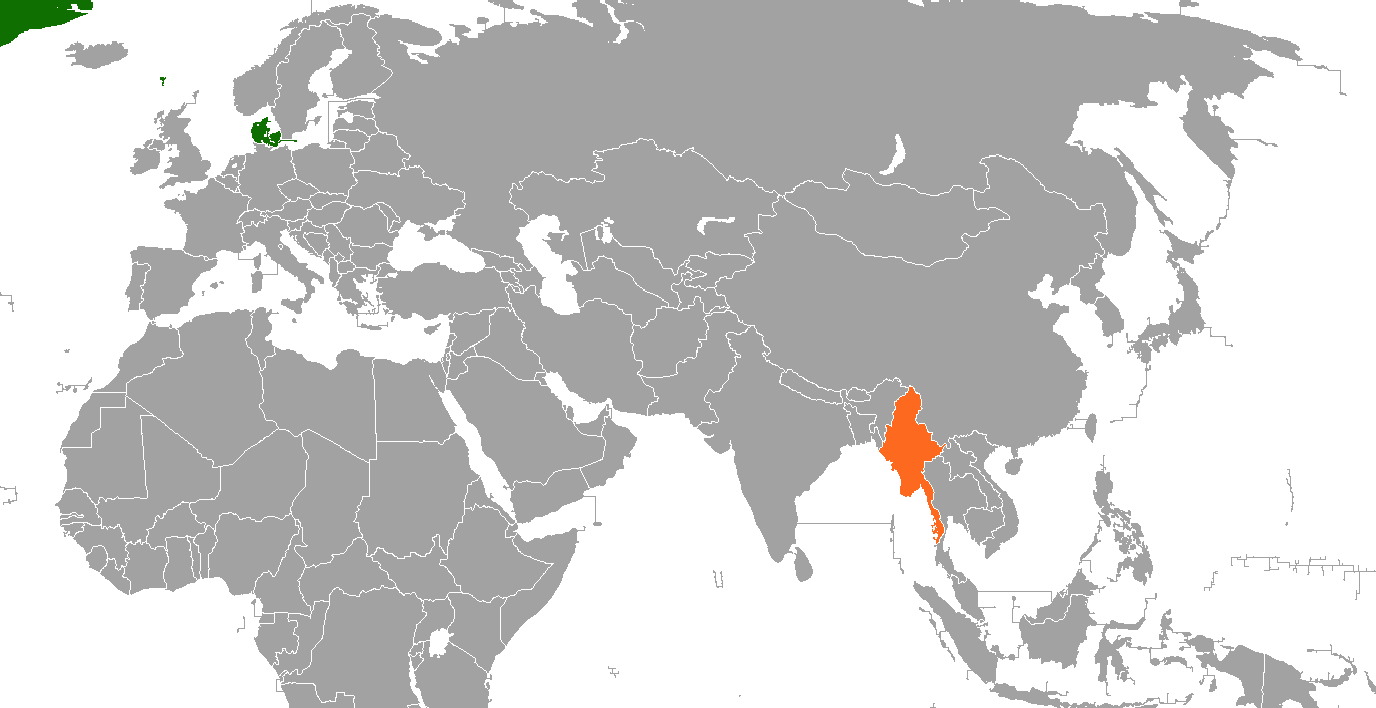
- Denmark: Myanmar

Denmark—Myanmar relations refer to the current and historical relationship between Myanmar and Denmark. Neither country has a resident embassy. Myanmar is represented in Denmark through its embassy in the United Kingdom, and Denmark is represented in Myanmar, through its embassy in Thailand. Diplomatic relations were established in 1955. Relations between the two countries are friendly. Denmark has the smallest amount of trade, of the countries in the European Union, with Myanmar. Denmark also supports the Norwegian based radio station, Democratic Voice of Burma.

== Assistance to Myanmar ==
Development assistance to Myanmar is a top priority of the DANIDAs engagement in Southeast Asia. 93 million DKK was given to education and healthcare projects.

Danish development assistance has focused on promoting democracy and human rights. Denmark was one of the first countries to respond to cyclone Nargis by providing humanitarian assistance to Burma. Three Diseases Fund was founded in 2006, and Denmark joined in 2009. Three Diseases Fund helps Myanmar fight HIV and AIDS, and has assisted with 73 million dollars.

== Burmese Consul Incident ==
In 1996, the consul in Myanmar for Denmark, James Leander Nichols, was sentenced to three years in jail. The sentence was for illegal possession of two facsimile machines and a telephone switchboard. Two months later, he died in prison. Despite Danish insistence, Burmese authorities refused to allow an independent autopsy. Soon after, the European Union, with Canada, called for a United Nations gathering on the democratisation process.

== Day's Work Day ==
On 3 November 2010, students from 140 different gymnasiums in Denmark and DanChurchAid, participated in the annual Day's Work Day. The money earned by the students goes to improve education for young people in Myanmar.

== See also ==
- Foreign relations of Denmark
- Foreign relations of Myanmar
