= Bhutan–Denmark relations =

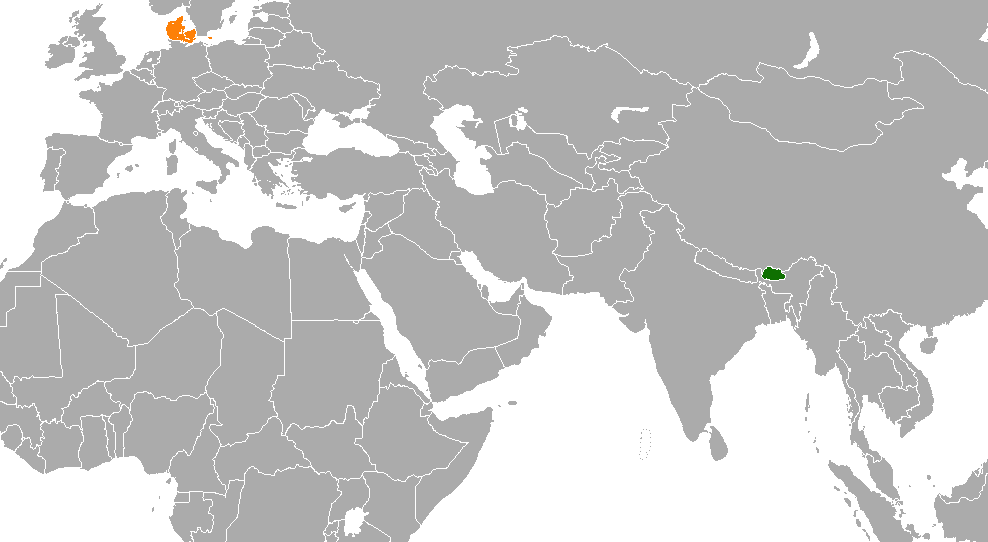
- Bhutan: Denmark

Bhutan–Denmark relations refers to the current and historical relations between Bhutan and Denmark. Denmark has a liaison office in Thimphu. Diplomatic relations were established in 1985. Denmark is the second-largest provider of development aid to Bhutan, after India.

== Cooperation ==
Denmark first provided developmental assistance to Bhutan in 1978, before choosing Bhutan as a Danish programme country in 1989. Its assistance focused on promoting the areas of health, education, environment, urban development and good governance. Bhutan's Former Prime Minister Jigme Thinley was granted an audience with Queen Margrethe II of Denmark in 2010.

Denmark has been supporting the education sector in Bhutan since the early 1990s. Denmark has also supported Bhutan with poverty reduction and freedom of press. 1.1 million DKK will be invested in the health sector, environment sector and urban development in 2012.

Bhutan and Denmark signed an agreement on good governance in June 2011, which granted Bhutan 50 million kr. to support of this goal.

Denmark's 2008 - 2013 strategy for Bhutan, was the final development programme between the two countries. Bilateral development cooperation officially ended in November 2014.

== See also ==
- Foreign relations of Bhutan
- Foreign relations of Denmark
