= Denmark–Iran relations =

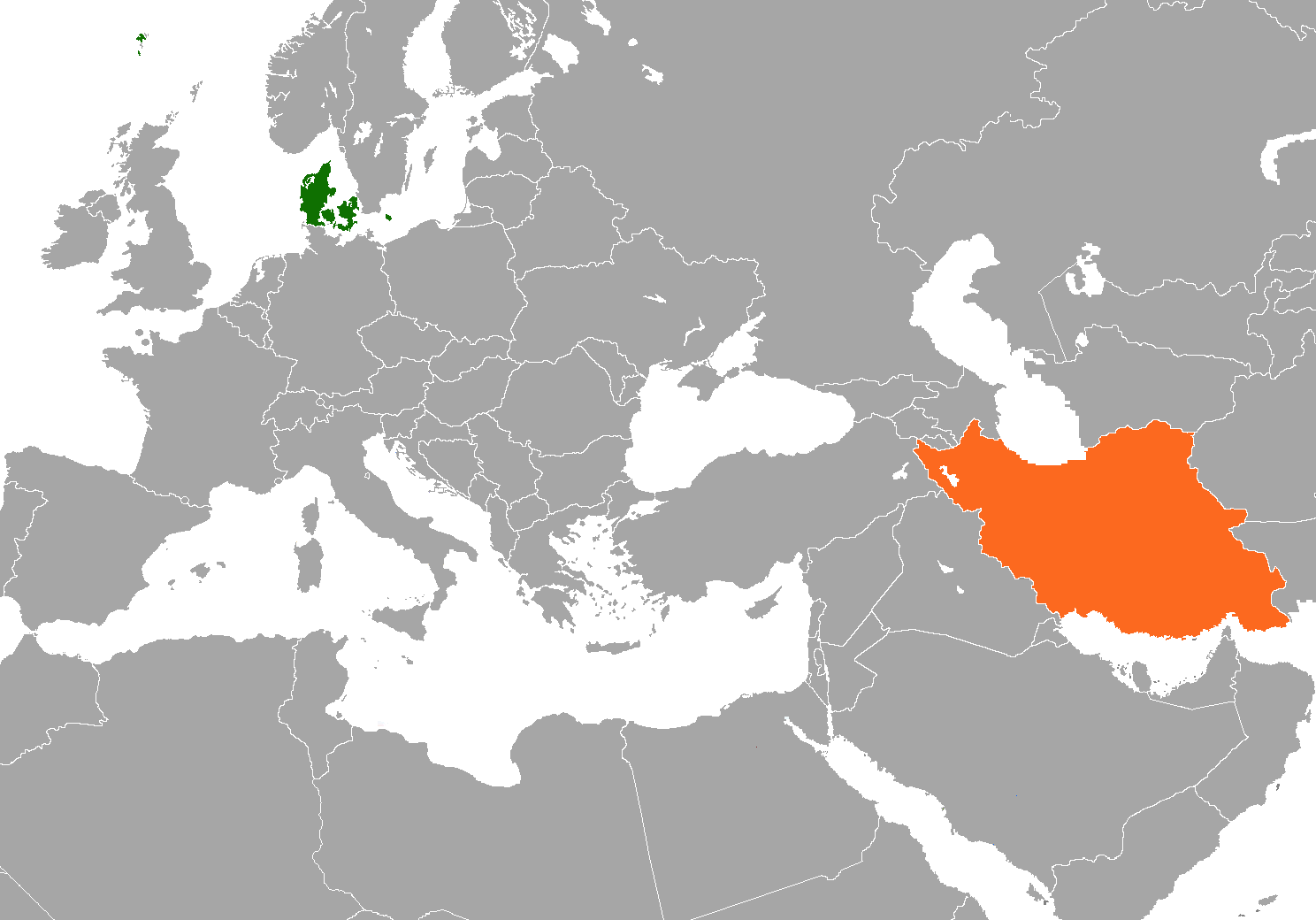

- Denmark: Iran

Diplomatic mission
- Embassy of Denmark, Tehran: Embassy of Iran, Copenhagen

The first Persian envoy to Denmark arrived in 1691 in order to negotiate the release of the Iranian-owned cargo of a Bengali ship seized by the Danish fleet. The Iranian diplomat had been issued with diplomatic credentials by Suleiman I of Persia (Shah 1666–1694) and opened negotiations with King Christian V of Denmark. He was unable to secure the release of the cargo.

== History ==
In 1933, a Danish consulate was established in Tehran which was later upgraded to an embassy. Also in 1933, with the arrival of Danish engineers in Iran, technical cooperation commenced. In the same year a contract was signed with the Danish engineering firm of Kampsax A/S to construct the Trans-Iranian Railway line. Five years later, on 25 August 1938, with the opening of the North- South railway line the Iranian desire of connecting the North to the South by rail came true. Following a state visit in 1958, Iran established an embassy in Copenhagen. More specifically, the mission in Copenhagen was launched on 19 February 1959 and Ali Asghar Nase was appointed Iranian ambassador. The 2006 Muhammad cartoons controversy saw the Danish embassy to Iran attacked by protesters and the Iranian Ambassador to Denmark called to Tehran; thus straining political and economic interaction between the two countries. On 30 October 2018, the Danish Security and Intelligence Service (DSIS) announced that they suspect Iranian Intelligence agencies was operating in Denmark, and that they were planning to kill the leader of ASMLA, who lives there. Denmark responded by recalling their ambassador in Tehran. On 1 July 2025, a Danish citizen was arrested in Germany on suspicion of spying for Iran, collecting information for a possible attack on Jews in Germany.

== Resident diplomatic missions ==
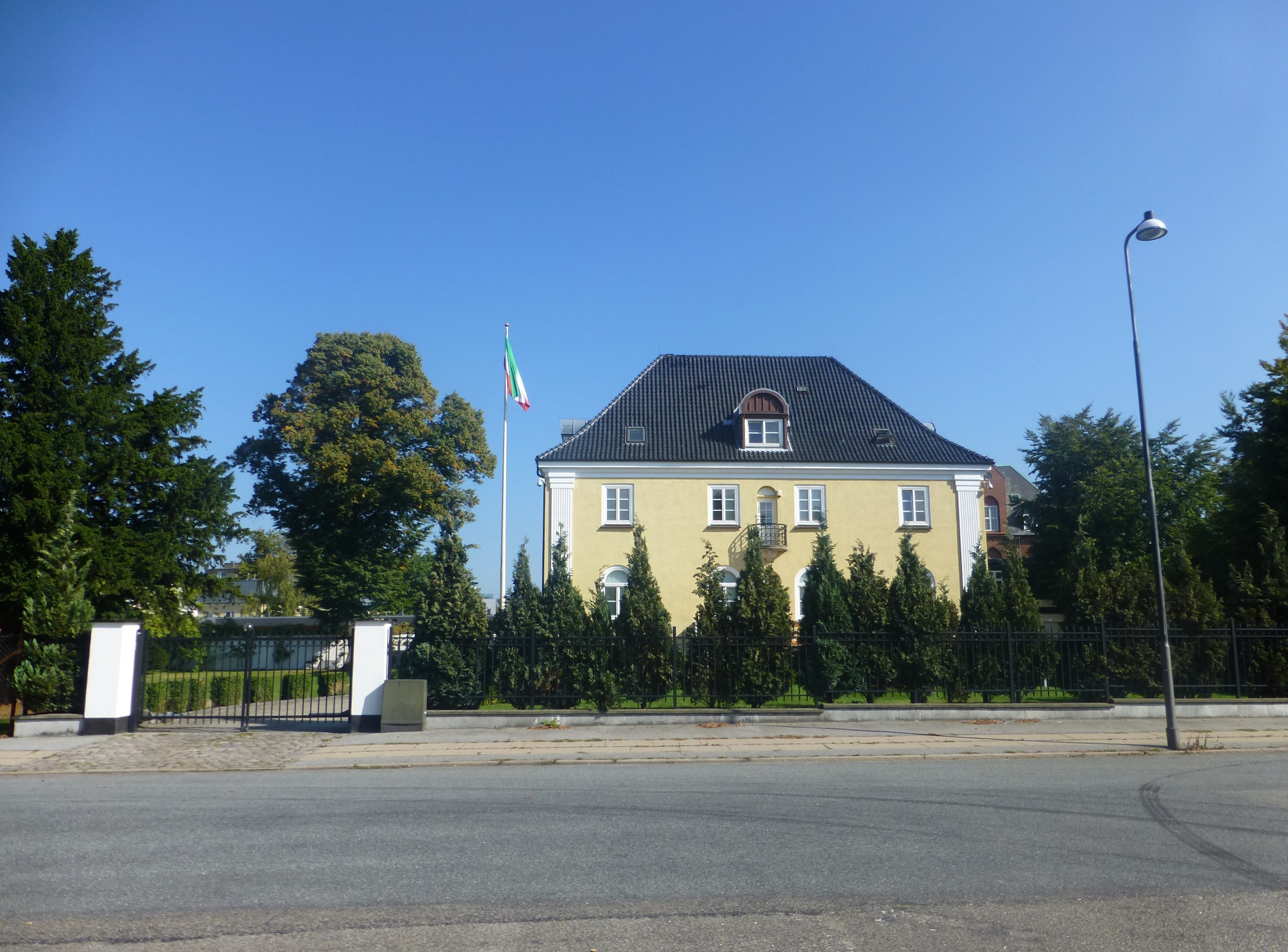
Embassy of Iran in Copenhagen

- Denmark has an embassy in Tehran.
- Iran has an embassy in Copenhagen.

== See also ==
- Foreign relations of Denmark
- Foreign relations of Iran
- Iranians in Denmark
- 2024 Iranian operations inside Australia
- Iranian external operations
