= Denmark–Egypt relations =

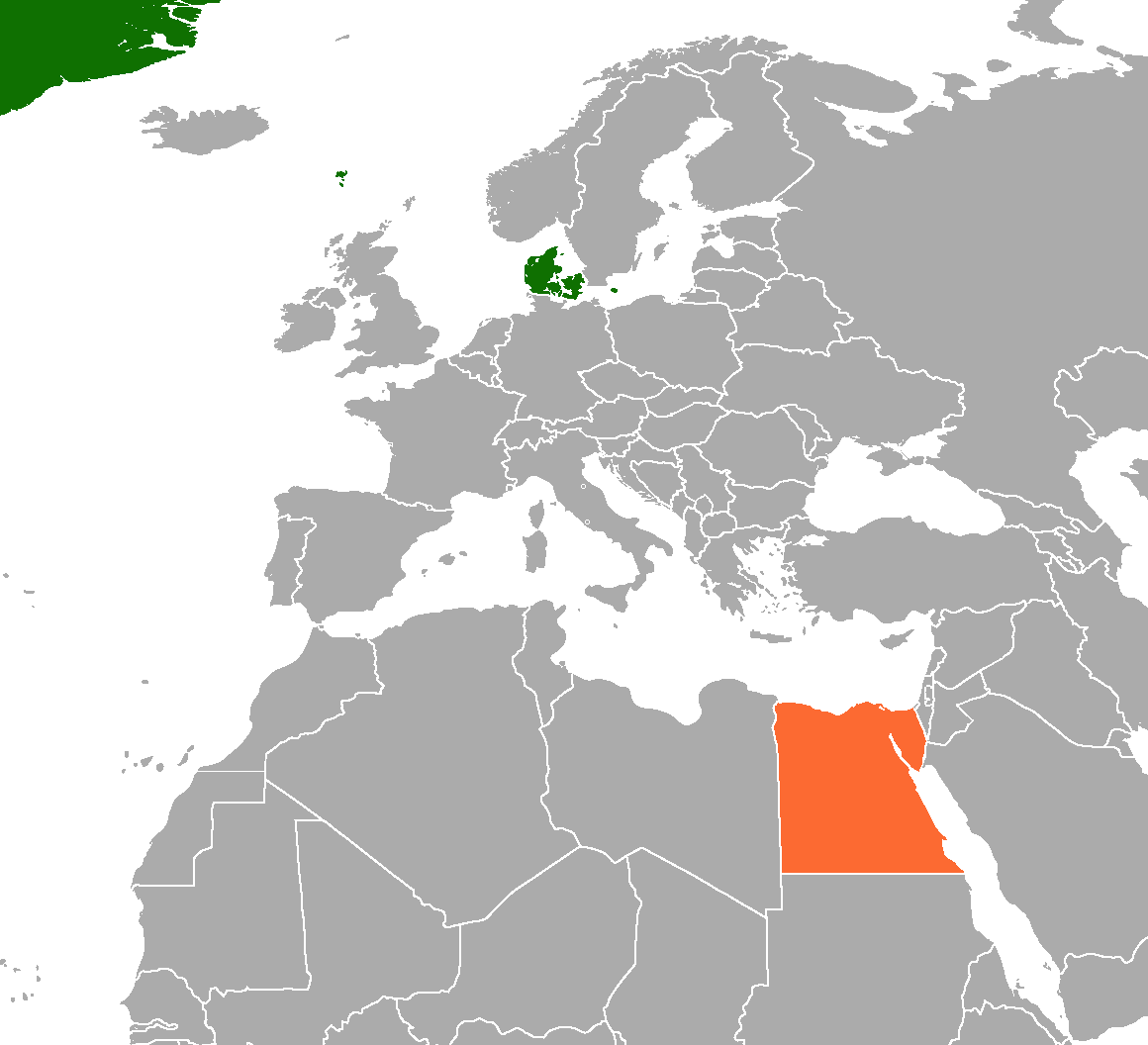
- Denmark: Egypt

Denmark–Egypt relations are foreign relations between Denmark and Egypt. Denmark has an embassy in Cairo, and consulates in Suez, Port Said and Cairo. Egypt has an embassy in Copenhagen. Both countries are members of the Union for the Mediterranean.

The Jyllands-Posten Muhammad cartoons controversy in 2006 caused a diplomatic crisis between Denmark and Egypt.

After Per Stig Møller's visit to President Hosni Mubarak in 2008, Mubarak described the bilateral relations as good and fruitful and expressed his support for their further expansion, especially in economic cooperation.

== Political relations ==
The Egyptian Minister of Foreign Affairs, Aboul Gheit, wrote several letters to the Prime Minister of Denmark and to the United Nations Secretary-General explaining that they did not want the Prime Minister to prosecute Jyllands-Posten; they only wanted "an official Danish statement underlining the need for and the obligation of respecting all religions and desisting from offending their devotees to prevent an escalation which would have serious and far-reaching consequences". Subsequently, the Egyptian government played a leading role in defusing the issue in the Middle East.

Egyptian newspaper al-Fagr reprints some of the cartoons, describing them as a "continuing insult" and a "racist bomb". and argued that they are blasphemous to people of the Muslim faith, are intended to humiliate a Danish minority, or are a manifestation of ignorance about the history of Western imperialism.

"He is finished as Egypt's leader. The only matter for discussion is how quickly that materialises ... We are not electing a new Egyptian leader. That is something the Egyptians themselves have to do. But what we need is that before Hosni Mubarak leaves the presidential palace he has to provide a roadmap for democracy."

— Lars Løkke Rasmussen

During the Egyptian Revolution of 2011, Minister for Foreign Affairs Lene Espersen strongly condemned the alleged Egyptian authorities' actions against the protests. Danish-Palestinian politician Naser Khader urged Mubarak to resign. Danish Foreign Ministry also warned against all travel to Egypt.

On 2 November 2025, during a diplomatic meeting for the opening of the Grand Egyptian Museum, the Danish foreign minister Lars Løkke Rasmussen gifted a Lego set of the Pyramids of Giza to the Egyptian foreign minister Badr Abdelatty.

== Economic relations ==
In 1940s commercial exchanges between Denmark and Egypt amounted 7 million DKK. An agreement on Culture, Science and Education was signed on 29 October 1972. In 1970, Denmark assisted Egypt with 9.7 million DKK, for wheat and flour.

Egypt was from 1989 to 2008 a program country for Denmark. 6 billion dollars were given for the support of the Egyptian projects, including a wind farm in Zafarana close to Ain Sukhna.

== High level visits ==
In October 2008, Per Stig Møller visited Hosni Mubarak. Hosni Mubarak visited Denmark on 17 December 2009. A delegation from the Egyptian Education Committee visited Denmark in 2007.

== Resident diplomatic missions ==
- Denmark has an embassy in Cairo.
- Egypt has an embassy in Copenhagen.

== See also ==
- Foreign relations of Denmark
- Foreign relations of Egypt
