= Colombia–Denmark relations =

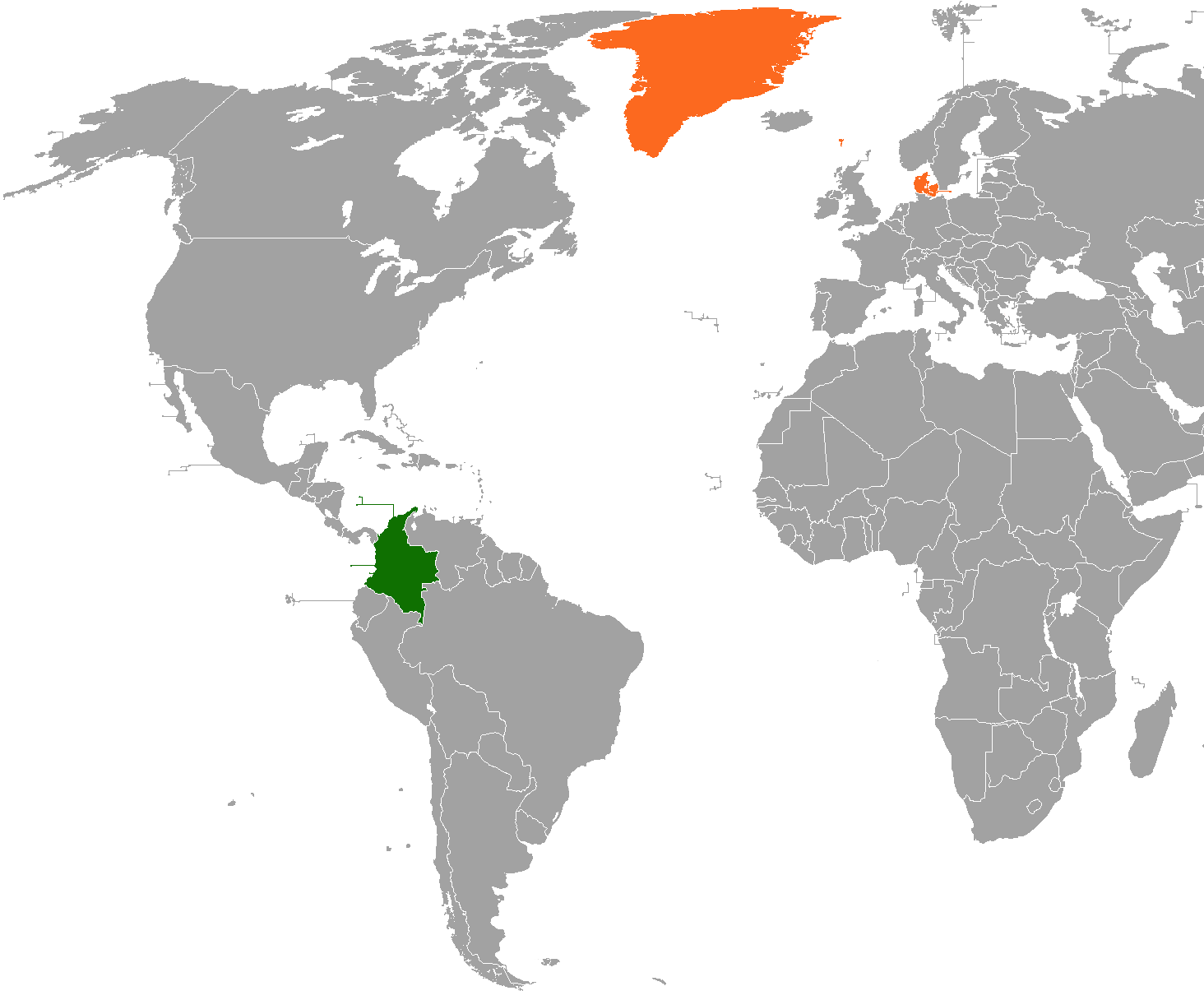
- Colombia: Denmark

Diplomatic mission
- Embassy of Colombia in Copenhagen: Embassy of Denmark in Bogotá

Colombia–Denmark relations are the diplomatic relations between the Republic of Colombia and the Kingdom of Denmark.

== History ==
Diplomatic relations between the two countries were established on 18 May 1931 through the trade and navigation treaty signed in 1929 between both nations and have been characterised by being friendly and cordial, with Denmark supporting peace processes in Colombia with the FARC and NLA guerrilla groups.

== Bilateral agreements ==
The two countries have signed several bilateral agreements such as an Agreement on economic, industrial and technological cooperation between the governments of the Republic of Colombia and the Kingdom of Denmark (1928); Treaty of Commerce and Navigation between the Government of Colombia and the Kingdom of Denmark (1929); Exchange of notes constituting an agreement on the exchange of goods and payment systems between the government of the Republic of Colombia and the Kingdom of Denmark (1955); Multiparty Trade Agreement between the European Union, Colombia, Ecuador and Peru (2013) and a Green Growth Commitment (2023).

== Economic relations ==
Colombia exported products worth 12,307 thousand dollars to Denmark, the main export products being coal and coffee, while Denmark exported products worth 128,639 thousand dollars, the main exported products being chemical products and machinery.

In 2022, Denmark exported $179M to Colombia. The products exported from Denmark to Colombia included Packaged Medicaments ($70M), Planes, Helicopters, and/or Spacecraft ($12.9M), and Vaccines, blood, antisera, toxins and cultures ($9.29M). Colombia exported $101M to Denmark. The products exported from Colombia to Denmark consisted of Coal Briquettes ($88.4M), Coffee ($4.09M), and Processed Fish ($3.23M).

== Diplomatic representation ==
- Colombia has an embassy in Copenhagen.
- Denmark has an embassy in Bogotá, and has honorary consulates in Barranquilla and Cali.

== See also ==
- Foreign relations of Colombia
- Foreign relations of Denmark
