= Denmark–Indonesia relations =

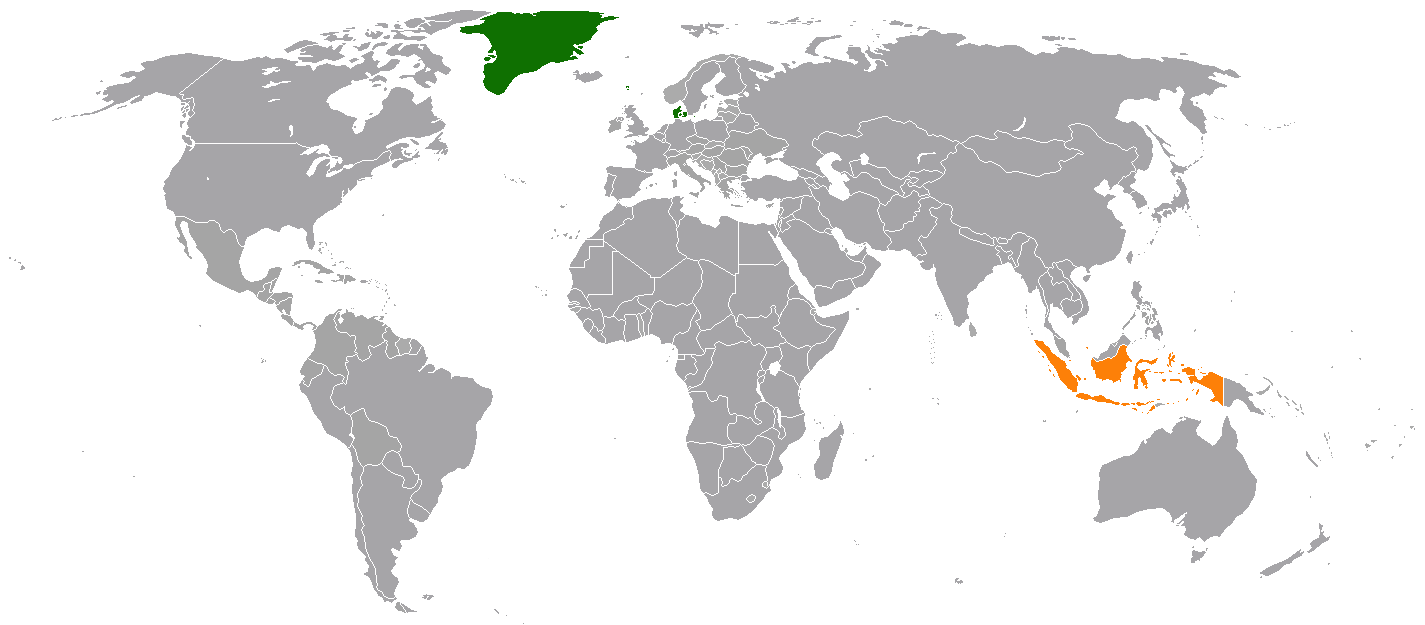
- Denmark: Indonesia

Denmark and Indonesia established diplomatic relations on 15 February 1950. Denmark has an embassy in Jakarta, and Indonesia has an embassy in Copenhagen. Bilateral relations are strong, as well as the humanitarian response to the December 2004 Indian Ocean tsunami, which claimed the lives of 45 Danes. In 2015, after focusing on China and South Korea, Denmark is gearing up to enhance its relations with Indonesia, hoping that it will help Denmark to build strong ties with the whole Southeast Asian region.

== History ==
=== Danish settlers ===
Relations between Danish explorers to Java's inhabitants obviously could be traced back to pre-Colonial era in the 17th century following successive waves of Europeans—the Portuguese, Spanish, Dutch and British—sought to dominate the spice trade at its sources in 'Spice Islands' (Maluku) of Indonesia. Danish merchants also arrived from Tranquebar, in search of pepper, to Bantenese/Bantamese land in Java. The Danish extended their commercial activities from their settlement in Tranquebar on the Coromandel Coast to various parts of Indonesia. These relations, to a small extent, came into being through the cooperation and advice of Dutchmen who found the road to Asia barred to their own enterprises because of the Dutch East India Company monopoly. The Danish merchants asked Banten's rulers permission to settle and trade.

=== Sultan of Banten's letters to Danish kings ===
In order to extend the trade relation, Sultan Ageng Tirtayasa of Banten sent some official letters to King Frederick III of Denmark and to King Christian V of Denmark. Dated on January 7, 1675, both the Sultan and the Shahbandar of Banten (Western Java) wrote the first letter to King Frederick III of Denmark. The Sultan asked for cannon and powder and mentioned that 176 bahara (a weight) of pepper, for which there had been no room in the Danish ship Færö, were being kept in store.

Another letter from the Sultan of Banten to King Christian V of Denmark is dated February 15, 1675. The Sultan again mentions the 176 baharas of pepper which had been deposited by Captain Adeler with the Banten nobleman, Duke Angabèhi Cakradana of Bantam. Due to massive Dutch traders approaching Java, Dutch conquered Bantam. The Danish no longer had permission to trade in Sunda Kelapa.

=== Modern era ===
Diplomatic relations between Kingdom of Denmark and Republic of Indonesia were established. A Danish embassy was opened in 1974.

== Political cooperation ==
In 2007, President of Indonesia Susilo Bambang Yudhoyono met with the Danish Prime Minister, Anders Fogh Rasmussen, in New York City. Danish Minister of Foreign Affairs Per Stig Møller visited Indonesia in 2007.

== High-level visits ==
On 17 December 2009, President Susilo Bambang Yudhoyono visited Copenhagen to attend the United Nations Climate Change Conference.

Queen Margrethe II of Denmark and the Prince Consort visited three Indonesian cities from 21 to 24 October 2015: Jakarta, Surabaya and Yogyakarta. The Danish royal visit was meant to strengthen the Indonesian–Danish relationship in culture and trade. They headed a Danish business delegation of around 50 companies that mainly represented four sectors: maritime, urban and clean technology, agri-business, and design and lifestyle.

== See also ==
- Foreign relations of Denmark
- Foreign relations of Indonesia
