= Denmark–India relations =

- Denmark: India

Diplomatic mission
- Embassy of Denmark, New Delhi: Embassy of India, Copenhagen

Envoy
- Danish Ambassador to India Freddy Svane: Indian Ambassador to Denmark Pooja Kapur

Denmark–India relations, also referred to as Indo-Danish relations, are the bilateral relations between Denmark and India. Denmark maintains an embassy in New Delhi, while India has an embassy in Copenhagen.

As of the latest data, approximately 21,000 Non-Resident Indians (NRIs) reside in Denmark.

== History ==
Tranquebar, a town in the southern Indian state of Tamil Nadu, was a Danish colony in India from 1620 to 1845. It is spelled Trankebar or Tranquebar in Danish, which comes from the native Tamil, Tarangambadi, meaning "place of the singing waves". It was sold, along with the other Danish settlements in mainland India, most notably Serampore (now in West Bengal), to Great Britain in 1845. The Nicobar Islands were also colonized by Denmark, until the British formally took possession in 1869. After Independence in 1947, the Indian prime minister Pandit Jawaharlal Nehru's visit to Denmark in 1957 laid the foundation for a friendly relationship between India and Denmark that has endured ever since. The bilateral relations between India and Denmark are based on cooperation in political, economic, academic and research fields. There have been periodic high level visits between the two countries.

=== Visits ===
Anders Fogh Rasmussen, the former Prime Minister of Denmark, accompanied by a large business delegation, paid a State visit to India from February 4–8, 2008. He visited Infosys, Biocon and IIM Bangalore in Bangalore and Agra. He launched an ‘India Action Plan’, which called for strengthening of the political dialogue, strengthening of cooperation in trade and investments, research in science and technology, energy, climate and environment, culture, education, student exchanges and attracting skilled manpower and IT experts to Denmark for short periods. The two countries signed an Agreement for establishment of a Bilateral Joint Commission for Cooperation. Mette Frederiksen visited India from October 9th-11th in 2021 where she had bilateral talks with Prime Minister Narendra Modi. This was the first visit by a Head of Government to India following the COVID-19 pandemic. Both sides reviewed the progress in Green Strategic Partnership which was established during the Virtual Summit held in September 2020. Frederiksen also gave a special address during an event organized by the Observer Research Foundation regarding the Green Strategic Partnership and collaboration between the two countries to combat climate change. During Modi's visit in 2022, Denmark and India signed bilateral agreements concerning clean water and green energy. This meeting marked the first time an Indian leader had visited Denmark in 20 years.

== Purulia case ==
In July 2012, the Government of India decided to scale down its diplomatic ties with Denmark after their refusal to appeal in their Supreme Court against a decision of its lower court rejecting the extradition of Purulia arms drop case prime accused Kim Davy a.k.a. Niels Holck. Upset over Denmark's refusal to act on India's repeated requests to appeal in their apex court to facilitate Davy's extradition to India, the Indian government issued a circular directing all senior officials not to meet or entertain any Danish diplomat posted in India.

== Agreements ==
Important Bilateral Treaties and Agreements:

- Technical Cooperation Agreement – 1970
- Bilateral Agreement on an Integrated Fisheries Project at Tadri, Karnataka - 1981
- Bilateral Investment Promotion and Protection Agreement- 1995
- Protocol on Avoidance of Double Taxation - 1995
- MoU Cooperation between CII and Confederation of Danish Industries – 1995
- Protocol on Foreign Office Consultation - 1995
- Joint Business Council Agreement between FICCI and the Danish Industry - 2002
- MoU Biotechnology for Bilateral Cooperation – 2004
- MoU Clean Development Mechanism – 2008
- MoU Cooperation in the area of Environment – 2009
- MoU Labour Mobility Partnership – 2009
- Social Security Agreement – 2010

== See also ==
- Foreign relations of Denmark
- Foreign relations of India
