= Denmark–Kenya relations =

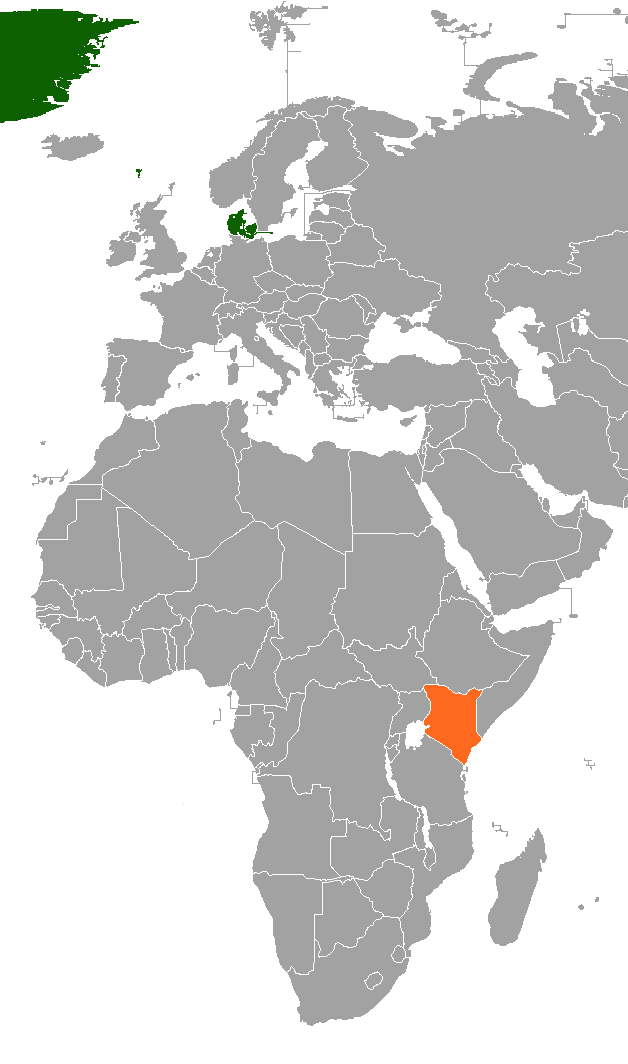
- Denmark: Kenya

This article discusses the current and historical relations between Denmark and Kenya.

== History ==
Danish Prime Minister Anders Fogh Rasmussen visited on 26 November 2008, the Karen Blixen Camp in Kenya. On 17 December 2009, Kenyan President Mwai Kibaki visited Denmark.

Denmark was the 12th country and eighth European country to recognize Kenya

== Development cooperation ==
Kenya has been a long-term development partner of Denmark.

Danish aid to Kenya goes back to Kenya's independence in 1963. Kenya is one of the four original beneficiaries for Danish development assistance. In 1989, Kenya was one of the first Danish program countries. The program aims to promote good governance and respect for human rights in Kenya and expand the democratic space to give citizens more say in its political and economic life. Denmark Supports along with other donors, the government's strategy to promote good governance, focusing on core areas as fighting corruption, judicial reforms, reforms in police and prison service.

Denmark helps the agriculture sector in Kenya. Denmark supports the development of the overall institutional framework for the sector, for an infrastructure, to increase access to credit and a general market orientation of the sector. 198 million DKK was given in a period from 2005 to 2010.

== Diplomatic missions ==
Denmark has an embassy in Nairobi, and Kenya is represented in Denmark, through its embassy in Stockholm, Sweden.
