= Denmark–Soviet Union relations =

Denmark-Soviet relations
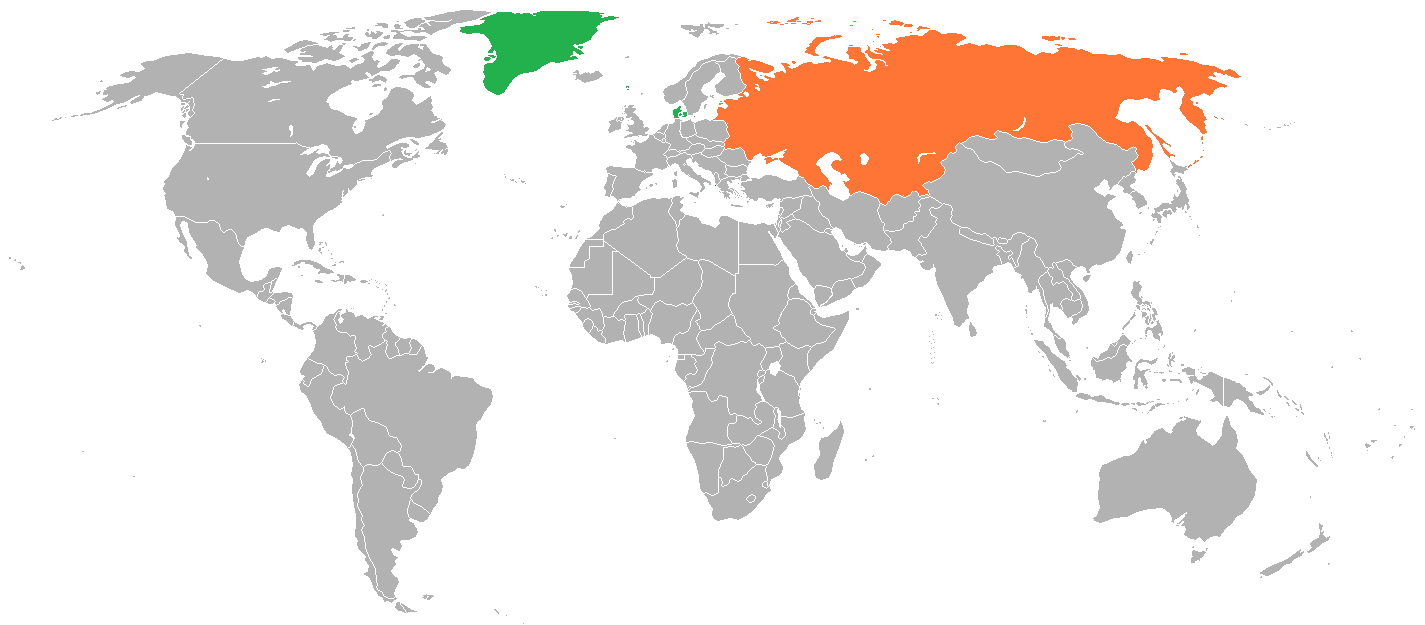

- Denmark: Soviet Union

Denmark–Soviet Union relations refers to the historical relations between Denmark and Soviet Union. Denmark had an embassy in Moscow, and the Soviet Union had an embassy in Copenhagen. Diplomatic relations were described as "excellent". Denmark recognized de jure the Soviet Union on 18 June 1924.

During the Cold War, the Soviet Union and the Eastern Bloc occasionally named Denmark as the "weak links in the chain."

Denmark never recognized the Soviet annexation of Estonia, Latvia and Lithuania.

== History ==
Russian revolutionary leader Vladimir Lenin visited Denmark for the first time in 1907, for a party meeting of Russian socialists in exile. Denmark deemed the meeting illegal and gave Lenin 12 hours to leave Denmark. In 1910, Lenin visited Denmark again, for the Eighth International Socialist Congress. Lenin later commented on the Danish socialism and the Danish Prime Minister Thorvald Stauning; "Stauning was a quasi-socialist as well as one of the most stingy and mean-spirited class snobs he had ever met."

During the Winter War in Finland from 30 November 1939 to 13 March 1940, 1,010 Danes including Oliver Savill traveled to Finland to fight the Soviets. Denmark also sent humanitarian aid to Finland.

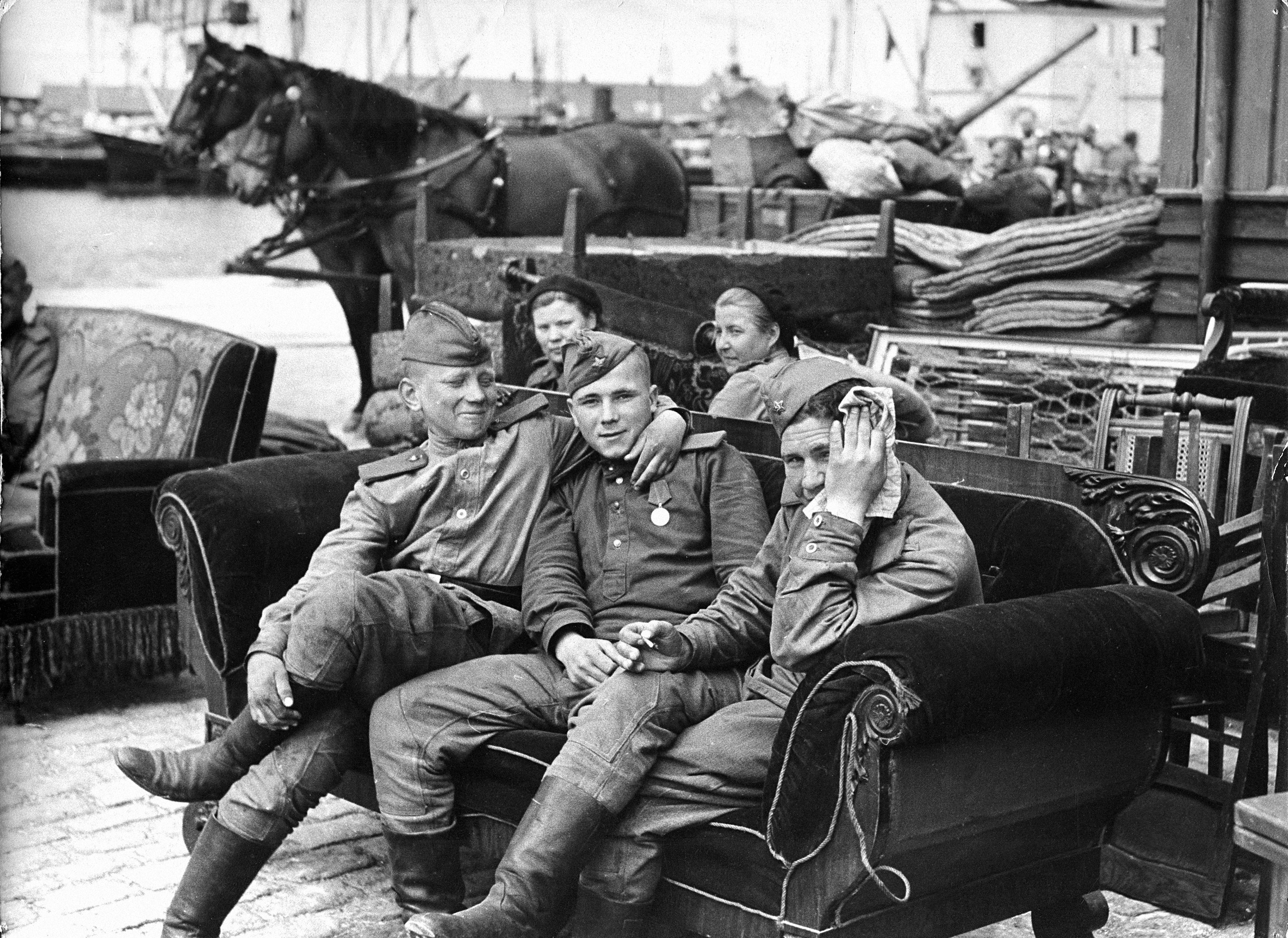
Soviet soldiers in Bornholm

In connection with Germany's attack on the Soviet Union in June 1941 German authorities in Denmark demanded that Danish communists should be arrested. The Danish government complied and using secret registers, the Danish police in the following days arrested 339 communists. Of these 246, including the three communist members of the Danish parliament, were imprisoned in the Horserød camp, in violation of the Danish constitution. On 22 August 1941, the Danish parliament (without its communist members) passed the Communist Law, outlawing the communist party and communist activities, in another violation of the Danish constitution. On 25 November 1941, Denmark joined the Anti-Comintern Pact. In 1943 about half of the arrested Danish communists were transferred to Stutthof concentration camp, where 22 of them died. As a result, many communists were found among the first members of the Danish resistance movement. Danish–Soviet relations further deteriorated when Denmark directly contributed to Germany's war effort on the Eastern Front with the 6,000 men strong Free Corps Denmark.

On 9 May 1945, Soviet troops occupied the Danish island of Bornholm, to fight the German soldiers. On 5 April 1946, the Soviet soldiers left Bornholm.

Following the severance in 1941, diplomatic relations between Denmark and the Soviet Union were restored on May 16, 1945 at the level of diplomatic missions.

In 1950, the Soviet Union signed a contract leasing the mansion Kristianiagade 5 in Indre Østerbro, Copenhagen for 20,000 kroner per year. In 1982, the mansion, as well as Kristianiagade 3 (consulate) and Bergensgade 11 (embassy school), were granted to the Soviets, on the basis of reciprocity, free of charge for the purpose of embassy requirements for a period of 70 years, until 31 December 2051.

On 7 July 1952, Denmark handed over the Danish-built tanker Apsheron to the Soviet Union. The decision faced protests in the United States. The government of the United States threatened to cut off aid to Denmark. On 26 July 1952, American President Harry S. Truman ordered the military, economic and financial aid to Denmark to be continued, despite the delivery of the Danish tanker to the Soviet Union.

From 16 June to 21 June 1964, Nikita Khrushchev visited Denmark. During his trip to Denmark, Nikita Khrushchev commented Denmark; "I have simply no words to describe the pleasure I felt observing the state of agriculture in Denmark."

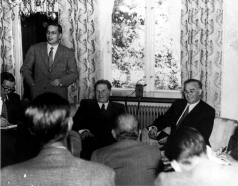
The announcement by the Soviets of the intention to launch an Earth satellite during the IGY. This photo was taken at the Legation of the Soviet Union in Copenhagen, Denmark, during the 6th International Astronautical Congress, August 1955, shortly after the Americans announced their intentions to launch a satellite.

Premier of the Soviet Union Nikolai Bulganin's policy against Denmark was to influence Denmark to limit their policy and commitments in NATO. In March 1957, Nikolai Bulganin warned Denmark that if they used their bases against the Soviet Union it would be suicide for Denmark. Bulganin said "If war is opened against the U.S.S.R., the annihilating power of modern weapons is so great it would be tantamount to suicide for foreign countries the size of Denmark."

After the Martial law in Poland in 1981, Denmark economically sanctioned Poland and the Soviet Union. In March 1983, Denmark was the first country in the European Economic Community to drop the sanctions against the Soviet Union. The Folketing voted 78–68 against a bill which would have reimposed sanctions.

On 1 October 1987, Gorbachev praised Denmark for not allowing foreign military bases and nuclear weapons on its soil. After the end of the Cold War, it was revealed that the Danish air force was trained in using nuclear weapons and since the 1960s had indirect access to American nuclear weapons, which were stored just 7 km (4 mi) south of the Danish border at Meyn in Germany. In the case of a major conflict, they would be transferred to Denmark where several locations already were prepared for their handling and storage.

== Economic relations ==
In 1976, Danish export to the Soviet Union amounted 1496,3 million DKK. In 1978, the export fell to 818,7 million DKK. Soviet export amounted 1660,8 million DKK in 1986, and in 1987, 1440,4 million DKK.

== Agreements ==
On 24 October 1969, Denmark and the Soviet Union signed a trade agreement.

== See also ==
- Denmark–Russia relations
