= Tom Nørring =

Danish diplomat

Tom Nørring is a Danish diplomat who, as of 2019, serves as the ambassador of Denmark to Australia, in which capacity he is simultaneously accredited to New Zealand and Fiji.
