= Denmark–Somalia relations =

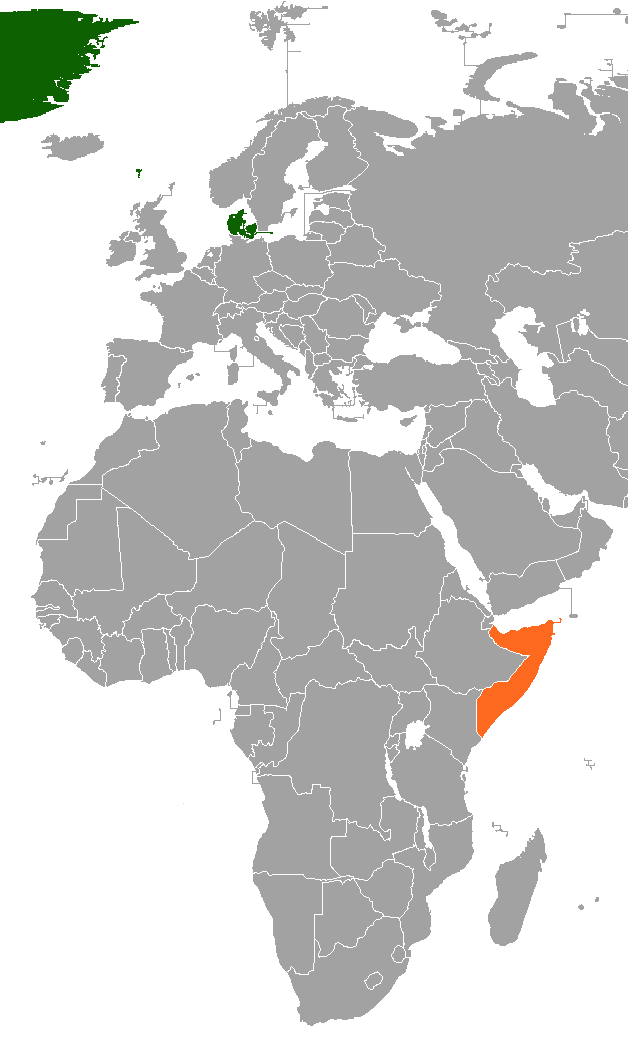
- Denmark: Somalia

Denmark–Somalia relations are bilateral relations between Denmark and Somalia.

== History ==
Diplomatic relations between Denmark and Somalia were established on 9 July 1960, shortly after the independence of the Somali Republic.

During the Siad Barre administration, Somalia and Denmark strengthened cooperation. The Danish International Development Agency agreed to provide a $1.4 million loan toward the development of Somalia's northern fisheries industry. Additionally, the Somali and Danish foreign ministries signed a loan agreement in 1981, wherein 45 million DKK (US$8,284,410.00) was issued to Somalia to finance imports of Danish capital goods, as well as local cost expenditures and purchases of Danish capital equipment and services.

In September 1992, Danish Foreign Minister Uffe Ellemann Jensen and other senior officials visited southern Somalia, one of the first foreign delegations to do so since the start of the civil war the year before. The Danish authorities in the ensuing years maintained relations with Somalia's newly established Transitional National Government and its successor the Transitional Federal Government.

The subsequent establishment of the Federal Government of Somalia in August 2012 was welcomed by the Danish authorities, who re-affirmed its continued support for the Somali government, its territorial integrity and sovereignty. In December 2013, the Danish government appointed Geert Aagaard Andersen as the new Danish ambassador to Somalia, the first in twenty years. Andersen presented his credentials to Somali President Hassan Sheikh Mohamud at a ceremony in Mogadishu.

In November 2019, Danish Foreign Minister Jeppe Kofod visited Mogadishu where he met Somali Prime Minister Hassan Ali Khaire and Foreign Minister Ahmed Isse Awad. After the trip, Kofod stated that Denmark would open a representation office in the country.

== Development cooperation ==
Developmental engagement between Denmark and Somalia dates back to 1980. Over the following 17 years, Denmark contributed 532 million DKK to Somalia, 63% of which constituted development funds and 37% humanitarian aid. This was a tiny fraction of the total development funding that Somalia received during the period as a Western ally. From 1984 to 1986, Somalia received US$5.5 million in development funds from Denmark, representing 0.8% of foreign assistance.

The Danish development projects in Somalia were later aborted after the start of the civil war in 1991. In 1992, the Danish authorities assisted Somalia with $7.5 million, but asserted that they were not in a position to specify the exact amount of funds that would be allotted for the following year until the security situation improved. Denmark and Germany later sent $4.5 million to Somalia in 2000, earmarked for demining. From 2003 to 2006, the Danish authorities also contributed 15 million DKK toward a water project in Somalia's northwestern Somaliland region, with a water supply in Erigavo.

With the security situation in Somalia improved, the Danish Foreign Ministry launched its new development policy in 2011 based on active diplomacy, security, governance, living standards, growth and employment. Within this official framework, the Danish government engaged Somalia's constituent autonomous regions, including Puntland, Somaliland and South Central Somalia, through the Interpeace programmes on democratisation, peace and women's engagement. It also established and funded the Somaliland Fund for the Somaliland regional administration's key areas. Additionally, local governance accountability and transparency were supported through JPLG, as well as gender equality via the UNDP. In terms of growth and employment, Denmark supported enabling business sector environment and fisheries and gums/resins value chains via the World Bank PSD programme in Puntland and Somaliland. It likewise supported marketing and institutional development through Terra Nuova in both regions' livestock sectors. To strengthen living standards, the Danish authorities also engaged in humanitarian support through the CHF and NGOs. In total, the development budget for 2011-14 was DKK 364 million, with DKK 20 million reserved for peace initiatives in Somalia.

== Diplomatic missions ==
- Denmark is accredited to Somalia from its embassy in Nairobi, Kenya.
- Somalia is accredited to Denmark from its embassy in Stockholm, Sweden.

== See also ==
- Danish counter-piracy strategy
