= Katrin =

- Gender: Female

Other names
- Related names: Katherine, Catherine

Katrin is a feminine given name. It is a German and Swedish contracted form of Katherine. Katrin may refer to:

== Sports ==
- Katrin Apel (born 1973), German biathlete
- Katrin Beinroth (born 1981), German judoka
- Katrin Borchert (born 1969), German-born Australian sprint canoer
- Katrín Davíðsdóttir (born 1993), Icelandic CrossFit athlete
- Katrin Dörre-Heinig (born 1961), German long-distance runner
- Katrin Engel (born 1984), Austrian handball player
- Katrin Green (born 1985), German Paralympian track and field athlete
- Katrin Käärt (born 1983), Estonian athletics sprinter
- Katrin Kauschke (born 1971), German field hockey player
- Katrin Kieseler, German-born, Australian sprint canoer
- Katrin Kliehm (born 1981), German football player
- Katrin Krabbe (born 1969), German athlete
- Katrin Krüger (born 1959), German handball player
- Katrin Loo (born 1991), Estonian footballer
- Katrin Mattscherodt (born 1981), German long track speed skater
- Katrin Meissner (born 1973), German freestyle swimmer
- Katrin Neuenschwander (born 1971), Swiss alpine skier
- Katrin Olsen (born 1972), Danish–Faroese rower
- Katrin Rutschow-Stomporowski (born 1975), German rower
- Katrin Schmidt (born 1986), Swedish footballer
- Katrin Schreiter (born 1969), German sprinter
- Katrin Wagner-Augustin (born 1977), German sprint canoer
- Katrin Zeller (born 1979), German cross country skier

== Television and film ==
- Katrin Bühring (born 1977), German actor and screenwriter.
- Katrin Cartlidge (1961–2002), British actress
- Katrin Ottarsdóttir (born 1957), Faroese movie director
- Katrin Karisma (born 1947), Estonian actress, singer and politician
- Katrin Kohv (born 1964), Estonian actress
- Katrin Laur (born 1955), Estonian film director, producer and screenwriter
- Katrin Lux (born 1980), Austrian actress
- Katrin Pärn (born 1977), Estonian actress
- Katrin Sass (born 1956), German actress
- Katrin Välbe (1904–1981), Estonian actress

== Politics ==
- Katrin Auer (born 1974), Austrian politician
- Katrin Göring-Eckardt (born 1966), German politician
- Katrin Lange (born 1971), German politician
- Katrin Lögering (born 1990), German politician
- Katrin Saks (born 1956), Estonian politician
- Katrin Schindele (born 1987), German politician
- Katrin Seidel (born 1967), German politician

== Other fields ==
- Katrin Adt (born 1972), German business executive
- Katrin Fridriks (born 1974), Icelandic artist
- Katrin Himmler (born 1969), German writer
- Katrin Kivi (born 1967), Estonian diplomat
- Katrin Kneipp, German physicist
- Katrin Koov (born 1973), Estonian architect
- Katrin Nyman-Metcalf (born 1963), Estonian-Swedish legal scholar
- Katrin Siska (born 1983), Estonian musician
- Katrin Wehrheim (born 1972), German-American mathematician

== See also ==
- KATRIN, experiment to measure the mass of the electron neutrino with sub-eV precision
- Katherine
- Kathrin
- Katrina
- Katrín
- Catherine
