= Denmark–Estonia relations =

Bilateral relations of Denmark and Estonia

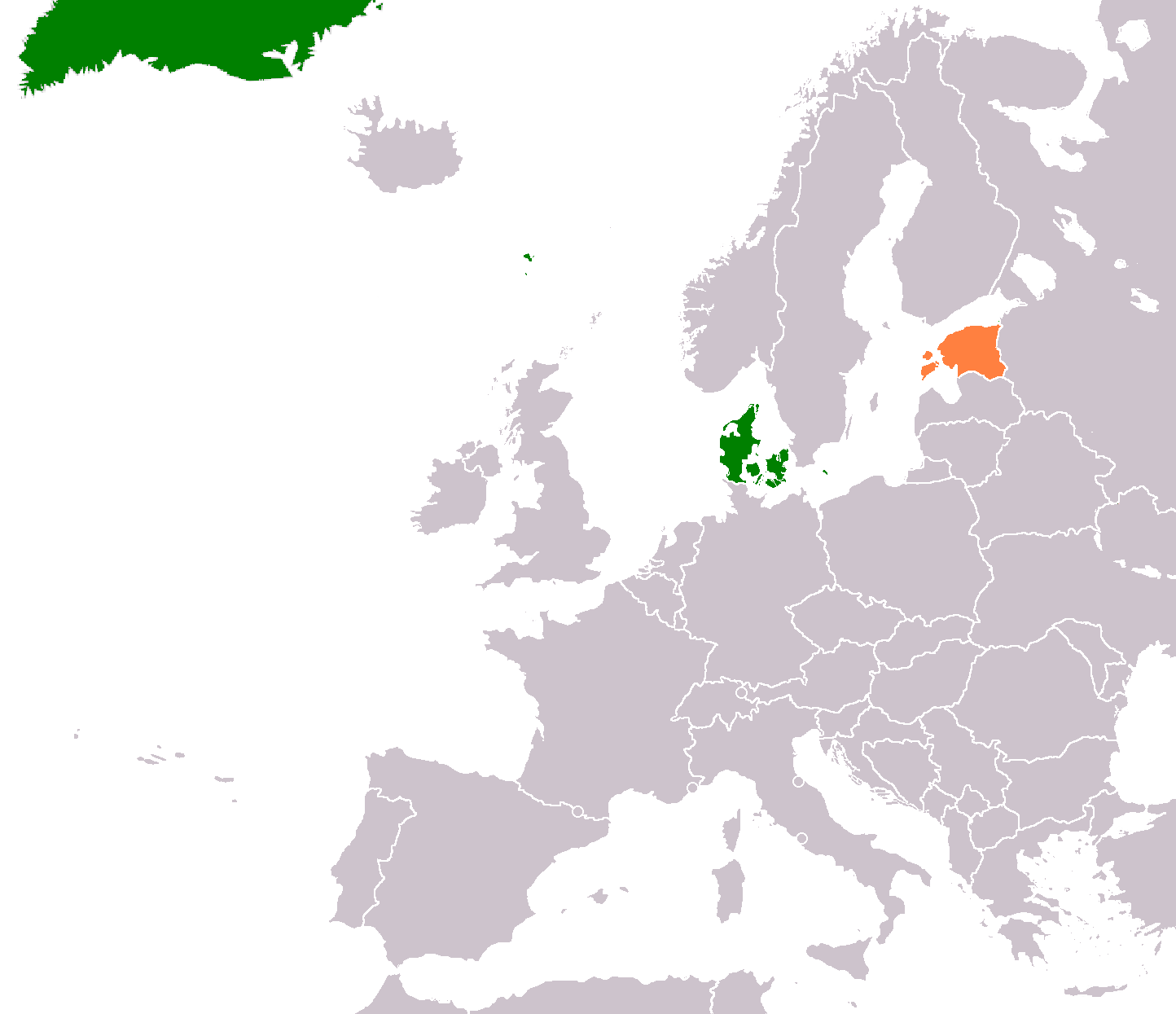
- Denmark: Estonia

Denmark recognized and established diplomatic relations with Estonia on 5 February 1921. Relations were renewed on 24 August 1991 as Denmark has never recognized Soviet occupation of the country. Both countries are members of the European Union, NATO, Joint Expeditionary Force, and the Nordic-Baltic Eight. Denmark has an embassy in Tallinn, and Estonia has an embassy in Copenhagen. Denmark has a military presence in Estonia, and Estonian Prime Minister Jüri Ratas described Denmark as a close friend in 2020.

It is believed that the Danish flag fell from the sky over Estonia on 15 June 1219 as Danish troops were conducting a crusade.

The coat of arms of Estonia is derived from the royal arms of Denmark.

== History ==
=== Danish Estonia (13th–17th century) ===
Danish Estonia refers to the territories of present-day Estonia that were ruled by Denmark firstly during the 13th–14th centuries and again during the 16th–17th centuries. Denmark rose as a great military and mercantile power in the 12th century. It had an interest to end the occasional Estonian and Couronian pirate attacks that threatened its Baltic trade. Danish fleets attacked Estonia in 1170, 1194, and 1197. In 1206, King Valdemar II and archbishop Andreas Sunonis led a raid on Ösel island, Saaremaa. The Kings of Denmark laid a claim on Estonia as their possession, which was recognised by the pope. In 1219 the Danish fleet landed in the major harbor of Estonia and defeated the Estonians in the Battle of Lindanise that brought Northern Estonia under Danish reign until the Estonian uprising in 1343, when the territories were taken over by the Teutonic Order and sold by Denmark in 1346.

=== Early relations with Estonia (1918–1921) ===
About 200 Danish volunteers took part in the Estonian War of Independence from 1918 to 1920 comprising the Danish-Baltic Auxiliary Corps led by Danish officer Borgelin. In 1918, Estonian statesman Jaan Tõnisson travelled to Denmark to head the Estonian Foreign Delegation. The Estonian Foreign Delegation situated in Copenhagen was the headquarter for Estonia to seek international recognition from other countries. On 5 February 1921, diplomatic relations were established with Flemming Lerche appointed envoy to Estonia with residence in Helsinki. The next year J.C. Johansen was appointed consul general in Tallinn. Johansen was the only foreign diplomatic envoy in Tallinn during the Estonian Independence War. Economically, relations were minimal as Estonia was reorganizing much of its industries and the Land Reform of 1919 only made the two countries competitors on the international agricultural market. In 1926, Estonia picked Ernst Carlsen as general consul in Copenhagen while a couple of consulates were opened all around the city.

On 18 December 1926, both countries established a conciliation commission. On 13 May 1930, an agreement on reciprocity was signed.

=== Relations with Soviet Estonia (1940–1991) ===
Denmark never recognized the Soviet occupation of Estonia. The Estonian government in exile was maintained by its foreign minister in-exile and representative to Denmark August Koern.

After the Soviet occupation of Estonia, Moscow ordered all diplomats abroad to return. However, after consultations with Germany, Denmark refrained from ordering Koern to leave which imitated the policy of the Germans. However, Denmark meticulously began a policy of removing all traces of the Baltic countries in the country, including ordering telecommunications companies to remove all Baltic diplomatic and consular representations from their telephone books. From 1941 to 1952, many Estonian refugees fled to Denmark. From 1945 to 1964, Denmark and the Soviet Union held difficult negotiations on compensation for the Danes who had their properties in Estonia due to nationalization policies. The Soviet Union urged Denmark to publicly admit that Estonia was part of Soviet sovereignty, concessions which Danish politicians would not give. Nonetheless, at a meeting with Andrey Vyshinsky, Danish negotiator Frants Hvass failed at expressing the Danish stance unambiguously which the Russians believed was sufficient. Ultimately, the two countries signed an agreement in February 1964 wherein the Soviets would pay Denmark 2.6 million DKK as compensation. Initially, the Danish demanded 20 million DKK.

Official contacts between Denmark and Soviet Estonia were minimal until the Singing Revolution which culminated with Danish Foreign Minister Uffe Ellemann-Jensen signing an agreement with his Estonian counterpart Lennart Meri on renewing diplomatic relations, on 24 August 1991.

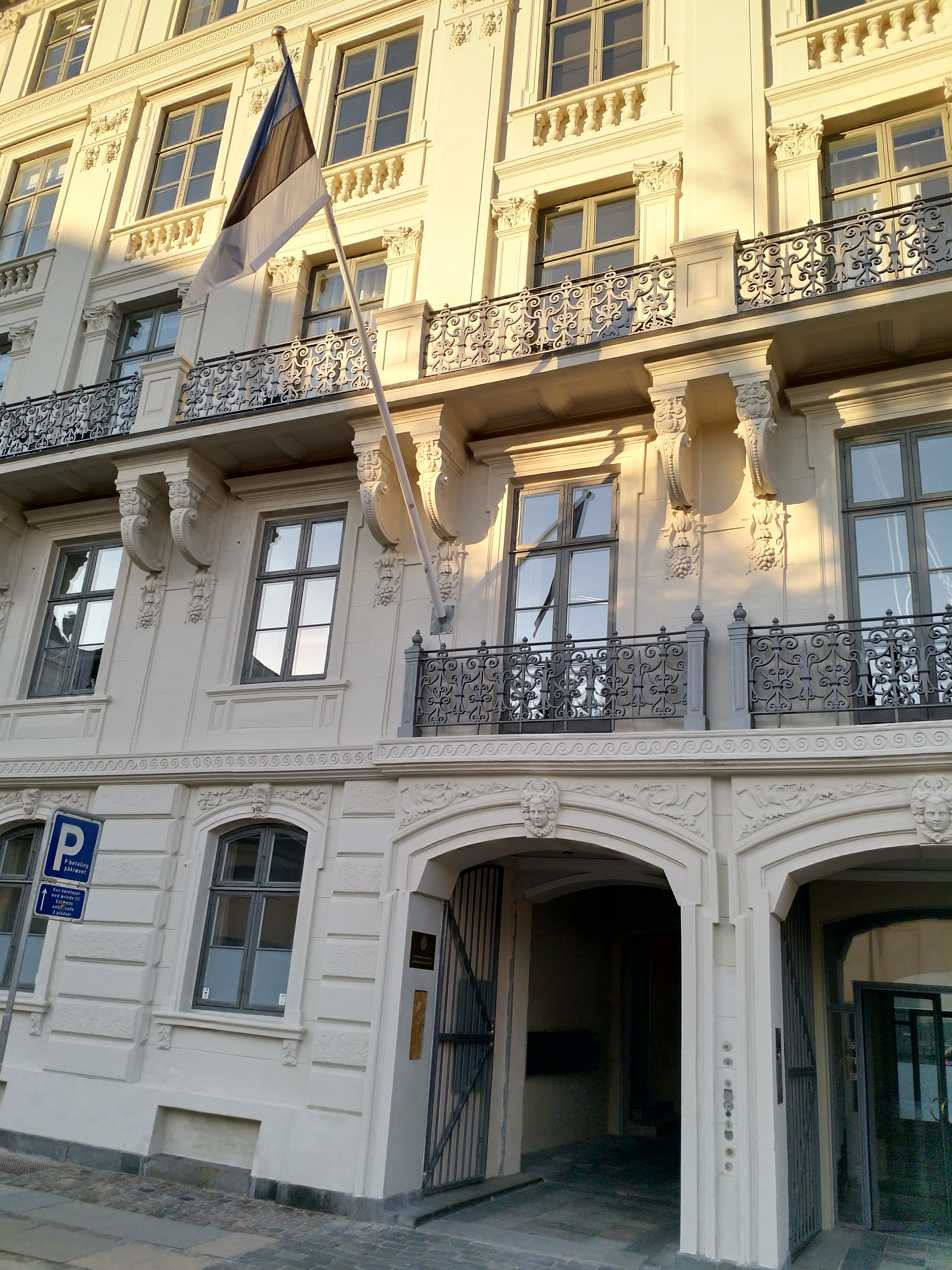
Estonian embassy in Copenhagen since 20 December 1990.

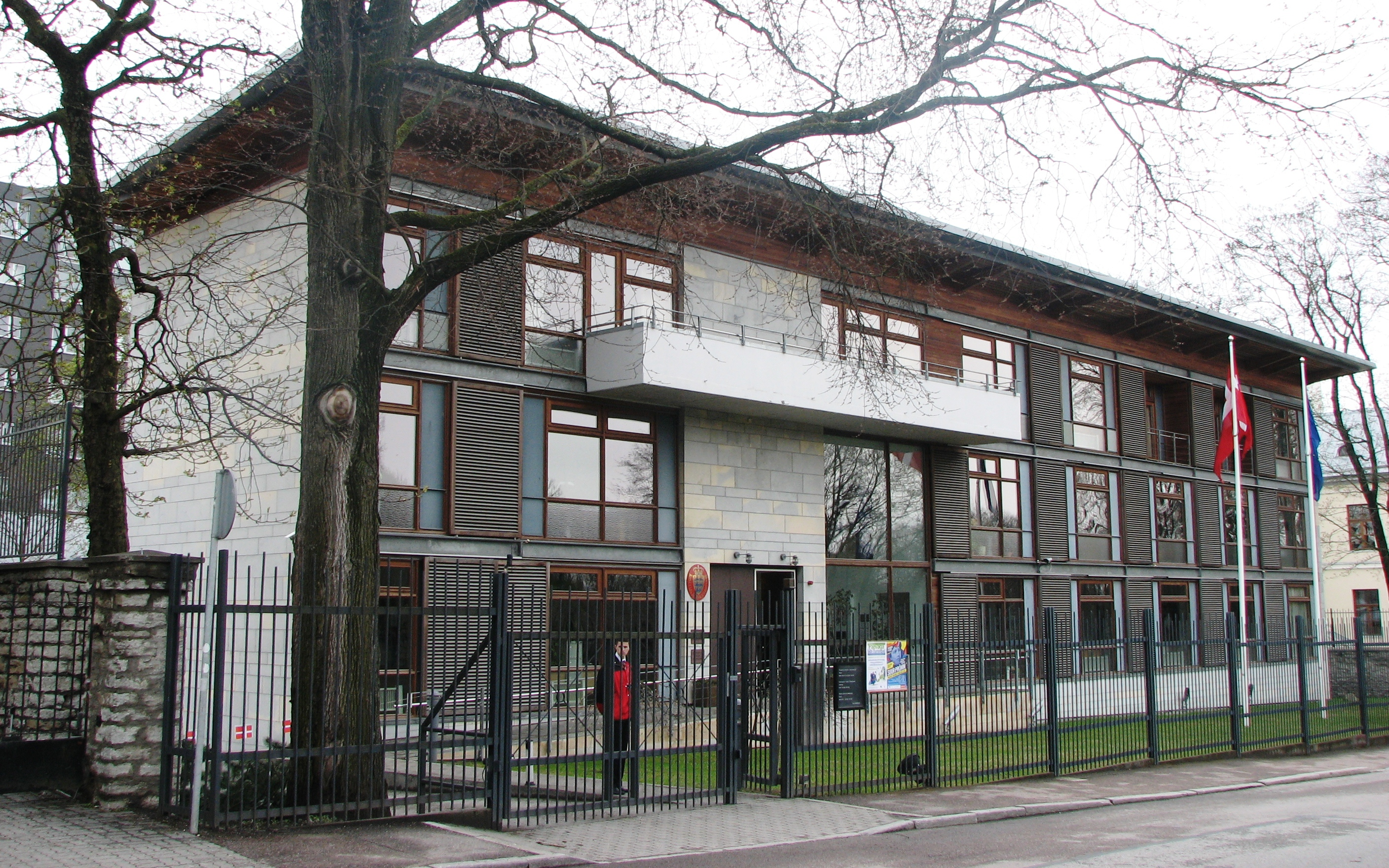
Danish embassy in Tallinn since 26 August 1991.

=== Modern relations ===
In the 1990s, Denmark pursued a policy which aimed at incorporating Estonia into the European Union, NATO and Council of Europe. From 1992 to 2003, the total Danish assistance to Estonia amounted to 147 million euro for defense, environment and fishing. Support to integrate the Russian minority also had a high priority.

==== Defense assistance ====
In the 1990s, Denmark assisted Estonia in building a national defense and moreover supported the creation of the Baltic Defence College with Danish Michael H. Clemmesen becoming the first Brigadier general of the college in February 1999 until 2004. The two countries signed their first defense agreement in March 1994. Prior to deployment as part of SFOR, the Estonian peace-keeping unit and reconnaissance unit received training in Denmark. The reconnaissance unit went on to serve under the Danish battalion in KFOR in Kosovo. After Estonia joined NATO in 2004, Denmark focused the Brigade Project aiming at preparing Estonian officers to lead a brigade. In 2009, the 1st Infantry Brigade of Estonia was tied to the Danish Division in training. Estonia moreover supported Danish troops in Afghanistan as part of ISAF.

From 2020 to 2021, 200 Danish soldiers were deployed to Tapa Army Base as part of the NATO Enhanced Forward Presence. From 2022 to 2023, a deployment of around Danish 200 soldiers is planned as well.

==== Environmental assistance (1991–2003) ====
From 1991 to 2001, Denmark aided Estonia with 31.8 million DKK for different environmental projects in an effort to support Estonia in fulfilling the environmental criteria on EU-membership. Projects included forest conservation, waste-related projects and assistance for the implementation of the Aarhus Convention. In 2002, an additional 21.7 million DKK was granted for 8 projects as the environmental assistance phased out same year.

== Cultural relations ==
The two countries have not signed any cultural cooperation agreements albeit having close relations on the matter. Many exchange projects have been conducted between Danish and Estonian municipalities and the Danish Cultural Institute had an office in Tallinn from 1990 to 2013.

== High level visits ==
Estonian President Lennart Meri visited Denmark in 1994, Arnold Rüütel in 2004, Toomas Hendrik Ilves in 2007, 2011, 2012 and 2015 and Kersti Kaljulaid in 2017.

Conversely, Danish Prime Minister Poul Nyrup Rasmussen visited Estonia in 2000, Anders Fogh Rasmussen in 2005, 2008 and 2009, Helle Thorning-Schmidt in 2011, Lars Løkke Rasmussen in 2018 and Mette Frederiksen in 2020 and again in 2022.

=== Royal visits ===
Queen Margrethe II visited Estonia in 2001 and 2019. The unofficial visit in 2001 was to the former Danish-controlled Saaremaa hosted by President Lennart Meri. Crown Princess Mary visited Estonia in 2014.

== List of ambassadors ==
List of Danish ambassadors to Estonia since 1991:

#	Officeholder	Term start date	Ref
1	Otto Borch	26 August 1991	
2	Sven Erik Nordberg	16 November 1991	
3	Svend Roed Nielsen	March 1995	
4	Jørgen Munk Rasmussen	April 2000	
5	Kirsten Geelan	27 September 2005	
6	Uffe Balslev	16 September 2009	
7	Søren Kelstrup	30 August 2012	
8	Kristina Miskowiak Beckvard	5 July 2017	
9	Niels Boel Abrahamsen	5 October 2022	

List of Estonian ambassadors to Denmark since 1991:

#	Officeholder	Term start date	Ref
1	Arvo Alas	27 November 1991	
2	Jüri Kahn	25 November 2006	
3	Taavi Toom	12 December 2001	
4	Meelike Palli	20 September 2006	
5	Katrin Kivi	14 October 2011	
6	Märt Volmer	13 October 2015	
7	Mart Laanemäe	17 February 2020	
8	Andre Pung	19 September 2024	

== Trade ==
The following table shows the annual trade numbers between the two countries from 1992 to 2020 in euro:

Year	Estonian imports to Denmark	Danish imports to Estonia
1992	€17.72 million	€12.86 million
1993	€25.56 million	€27.88 million
1994	€31.9 million	€34.85 million
1995	€48.58 million	€48.99 million
1996	€58.23 million	€75.62 million
1997	€66.19 million	€89.18 million
1998	€100.94 million	€103.71 million
1999	€117.57 million	€89.34 million
2000	€167.99 million	€124.12 million
2001	€187.88 million	€130.04 million
2002	€184.32 million	€144.07 million
2003	€160.49 million	€140.64 million
2004	€165.95 million	€138.27 million
2005	€169.69 million	€149.98 million
2006	€212.4 million	€204.49 million
2007	€212.7 million	€238.85 million
2008	€236.43 million	€225.84 million
2009	€190.87 million	€171.57 million
2010	€179.68 million	€158.17 million
2011	€227.08 million	€177.91 million
2012	€232.37 million	€209.87 million
2013	€265.32 million	€192.71 million
2014	€292.49 million	€214.37 million
2015	€290 million	€215.57 million
2016	€311.23 million	€246.26 million
2017	€356.57 million	€250.11 million
2018	€363.84 million	€256.46 million
2019	€357.44 million	€242.74 million
2020	€355.88 million	€218.2 million
2021	€396.44 million	€303.58 million
2022	€529.89 million	€337.24 million

== Resident diplomatic missions ==
- Denmark has an embassy in Tallinn.
- Estonia has an embassy in Copenhagen.

== See also ==
- Foreign relations of Estonia
- Foreign relations of Denmark
- Baltic Air Policing
- Toompea Castle
- Operation Saber Strike

== Bibliography ==
- Kyhn, Peter (2000), Dansk-estiske forbindelser de sidste hundrede år (in Danish), University of Lund, p. 31
- Various authors (2021), Denmark and Estonia - 100 Years of Diplomatic Relations, p. 93, ISBN 9789916406427
