= 1984 in Ireland =

- Centuries: 18th; 19th; 20th; 21st
- Decades: 1960s; 1970s; 1980s; 1990s; 2000s
- See also: 1984 in Northern Ireland; Other events of 1984; List of years in Ireland

Events from the year 1984 in Ireland.

== Incumbents ==
- President: Patrick Hillery
- Taoiseach: Garret FitzGerald (FG)
- Tánaiste: Dick Spring (Lab)
- Minister for Finance: Alan Dukes (FG)
- Chief Justice: Tom O'Higgins
- Dáil: 24th
- Seanad: 17th

== Events ==
=== January ===
- 1 January –
  - The Department of Posts and Telegraphs split into An Post and Telecom Éireann.
  - Galway City began celebrations marking its mayoral status granted by King Richard III in 1484.
- 10 January – Seán MacEntee, founder member of the Fianna Fáil party and former Tánaiste, died aged 94. He was the last surviving member of the First Dáil.
- 31 January – Ann Lovett, aged 15, died after giving birth to a boy in a grotto in Granard, County Longford. Reporting on the incident on The Gay Byrne Show uncovered many stories from listeners of rape, abortion and sexual abuse.

=== February ===
- 14 February – President Patrick Hillery attended the state funeral in Moscow of the Soviet premier, Yuri Andropov. Visiting world leaders were greeted by the new premier, Konstantin Chernenko.

=== March ===
- 14 March – Sinn Féin member of parliament (MP) Gerry Adams was shot and wounded in Belfast.
- 21 March – Dublin Corporation confirmed that it had handed over the ownership of three public roads (Portland Street West, Rainfort Street (between the Robert Street and Crane Street junctions) and Robert Street (between the Portland Street West and Bond Street junctions)) to the Guinness Brewery in return for a site the Corporation required for road widening at Victoria Quay, near the newly-opened Frank Sherwin Bridge. Guinness had first requested the closure of the three roads in 1978 "in the interests of security."
- 29 March – The Licensed Vintners Association voted to abolish the Holy Hour in pubs and hotels in Dublin and Cork which close for one hour between 2.30 pm and 3.30 pm. The Hour was introduced during the 1920s by Minister for Justice Kevin O'Higgins.

=== May ===
- 2 May – The New Ireland Forum, convened to address the war in Northern Ireland, published its report presenting three possibilities for discussion: a unitary Irish state, a federal/confederal state, and joint sovereignty.

=== June ===
- Visit by Ronald Reagan
  - 1 June – United States President Ronald Reagan arrived at Shannon Airport to begin a state visit.
  - 2 June – Reagan was at Galway, Ballyporeen (his ancestral home), and Phoenix Park in Dublin.
  - 3 June – Ten thousand people protested outside Reagan's state banquet in Dublin Castle.
  - 4 June – Reagan addressed a joint session of the houses of the Oireachtas.
- 18 June – European Parliament elections were held in Ireland and Northern Ireland.

=== July ===
- 13 July – The Ford Motor Company assembly plant in Cork closed. The closure of the Dunlop tyre factory in the same city had been announced previously and the Verolme Cork Dockyard was closed as a shipbuilder at the end of the year.
- 14 July – The Columban missionary Niall O'Brien, who was imprisoned in the Philippines, was released.
- 17 July – Some workers in Dunnes Stores in Henry Street, Dublin refused to handle South African produce as a protest against apartheid.
- 19 July – The strongest earthquake ever recorded in Ireland, the 5.4 magnitude Llŷn Peninsula earthquake near Caernarvon in Wales, rocked the Irish eastern seaboard and was felt by many in Dublin. Numerous aftershocks occurred over the following month.
- 23 July – The Dublin Area Rapid Transit (DART) rail service between Howth and Bray was inaugurated.

=== September ===
- 28 September – The Dublin telephone system collapsed due to network overload as a result of a phone-in competition on the illegal radio station, Radio Nova.
- 29 September - The Fenit (Co Kerry) based trawler, the Marita Ann, was intercepted and seized by the Naval Service near the Skellig Islands, with arms and ammunition on board which were destined for the Provisional IRA

=== October ===
- 1 October – Queen Elizabeth II of the United Kingdom presented a Royal Charter to the University of Ulster.
- 5 October – Women workers in Dunnes Stores in Dublin, who were on strike for the previous 11 weeks in support of a dispute over the handling of South African fruit, began a sit-in at the store.
- 12 October – Brighton hotel bombing – The Irish Republican Army killed five people in a bomb attack at the Grand Hotel in Brighton, England during the British Tory Party annual conference, narrowly missing Prime Minister Margaret Thatcher.
- 19 October
  - The Spanish trawler Sonia was spotted by the Irish Naval Service patrol vessel Aisling in Irish territorial waters off the coast of County Wexford and suspected to be fishing illegally. The Aisling pursued the Sonia for five hours, firing almost 600 rounds during the pursuit, initially as warning shots, but soon targeting the trawler itself. Some seven hours later, just after midnight on the morning of 20 October, the Sonia broadcast a distress signal from 45 miles (72 km) north of Land's End in Cornwall stating that she was taking on water. A United Kingdom RAF Search and Rescue Force helicopter was mobilised and picked up thirteen of her crew; the remaining three were rescued by the West German cargo vessel Achat. The Sonia sank soon afterwards.
  - The final passenger ferry service across the River Liffey in Dublin took place between North Wall Quay, Ringsend and South Wall Quay.
- 22 October – The first stage of the new Rice Bridge over the River Suir in Waterford was opened to road traffic.

=== November ===
- 5 November – The RTÉ Radio current affairs programme, Morning Ireland, was broadcast for the first time.
- 8 November – RTÉ Television's first newsreader, Charles Mitchel, delivered his final news bulletin.
- 14 November – Irish Shipping Limited was placed in liquidation.

=== December ===
- 2 December – European Economic Community heads of government visited President Hillery and Mrs. Hillery at the President's residence, Áras an Uachtaráin.
- 7 December – The most sophisticated naval vessel ever built in the country, the £25 million LÉ Eithne, was commissioned at the Haulbowline naval base.

== Arts and literature ==
- May – The Irish Film Theatre in Dublin closed at the end of the month due to insufficient box-office revenue.
- 24 June – The Campaign for Nuclear Disarmament (CND) Solstice Rock Festival took place at Saint Anne's Park in Raheny, Dublin.
- 8 July – The Slane Concert was headlined by Bob Dylan with support from In Tua Nua, UB40, and Santana, and with guests Van Morrison and Bono.
- October – Ronan Sheehan was awarded the Rooney Prize for Irish Literature.
- 18 October – Van Morrison was in concert at the Simmonscourt Extension of the Royal Dublin Society.
- 31 October – The annual Oíche Shamhna fancy dress Céili Mór was held in Kilronan on the island of Inis Mór.
- December – Pat Murphy's film Anne Devlin was released, starring Brid Brennan, with Bosco Hogan as Robert Emmet.
- The literary Kate O'Brien Weekend in Limerick was celebrated for the first time.

== Sport ==
=== Association football ===
- Cork City founded and elected to the League of Ireland Premier Division. Former Chelsea and Cork Celtic hero Bobby Tambling was the first manager appointed.

=== Golf ===
- The Irish Open won by Bernhard Langer (West Germany).

=== Horse racing ===
- Irish Grand National steeplechase won by Bentom Boy ridden by Mrs Ann Ferris, the first woman winner.

== Births ==
- 2 January – Denis Behan, association footballer.
- 6 January – Stephen Elliott, association footballer.
- 10 January – Alan McCormack, association footballer.
- 10 February – John Fitzgerald, association footballer.
- 21 February – Damien Molony, television actor.
- 22 February – Tommy Bowe, international rugby player.
- 4 March – Kevin O'Brien, cricketer.
- 8 March – Nora Jane Noone, actress.
- 16 March – Aisling Bea, born Aisling O'Sullivan, actress, comedian, and writer.
- 17 March – David Collins, Galway hurler.
- 4 April – Willie O'Dwyer, Kilkenny hurler.
- 7 April – Bryan Cullen, Dublin Gaelic footballer.
- 11 April – Michael Cussen, Cork hurler.
- 17 April – Rosanna Davison, model, Miss World 2003.
- 18 April – Killian O'Sullivan, actor.
- 13 May – Mark O'Brien, association footballer.
- 4 June – Kevin Hartnett, Cork hurler.
- 11 June – Andy Lee, boxer.
- 25 June – Killian Donnelly, stage actor
- 2 July – Ger O'Brien, association footballer.
- 5 July – Paul Keegan, association footballer.
- 21 August – Conor Kenna, association footballer.
- 6 September – Brian Murray, Limerick hurler.
- 12 October – Anthony Nash, Cork hurler.
- 19 November – Stephen Bradley, association footballer.
- 30 November – Andrew O'Shaughnessy, Limerick hurler.
- 18 December – Katie Walsh, jump jockey.
- 31 December – Anthony Flood, association footballer.
- Full date unknown – Pamela Fitzgerald, camogie player.

== Deaths ==
- 10 January – Seán MacEntee, Teachta Dála (TD) (1918-1922 and 1927–1969), Minister for Finance (1923–1939 and 1951–1954) and Tánaiste (1959–1965), (born 1889).
- 24 January – Bernard Cowen, TD (1969–1973 and 1977–1984), Senator (1973–1977) and Minister of State (1982), (born 1932).
- 30 January – Luke Kelly, singer, folk musician and member of the band The Dubliners (born 1940).
- 11 February – Theodore William Moody, historian (born 1907).
- 3 March – Rinty Monaghan, world flyweight boxing championship (born 1920).
- 19 March – Charlie Ware, hurler (Erin's Own, Waterford senior team, Munster), (born 1900).
- 24 March – Fintan Kennedy, General President of IT&GWU, member of the Seanad from 1969 to 1981.
- 6 April – Jimmy Kennedy, songwriter (born 1902).
- 26 April – Kathleen Behan, mother of Brendan Behan (born 1889).
- June – Alec Mackie, association footballer (born 1903).
- 21 July – Paddy Grace, hurler (Éire Óg, Carrickshock, Dicksboro, Kilkenny senior team, Leinster), (born 1917).
- 8 August – Denis Johnston, dramatist (born 1901).
- 13 August – Jack Lawrence, cricketer (born 1904).
- 7 September – Liam O'Flaherty, novelist and short story writer (born 1896).
- 15 September – Charles Lynch, pianist (born 1906).
- 4 November – Fintan Coogan Snr, TD (1954–1977), (born 1910).
- 29 December – Robert Farren (Roibeárd Ó Faracháin), poet (born 1909).
- 30 December – William Bedell Stanford, classical scholar and senator (born 1911).

== See also ==
- 1984 in Irish television
