= Kathrin =

Kathrin or Katrin or Kathryn or Kathrine is a female given name.

== Persons with the name ==
- Ann-Kathrin Kramer (born 1966), German writer and actress
- Ann-Kathrin Linsenhoff (born 1960), German athlete in equestrian
- Kathryn Adams (1893–1959), United States actress in silent movies
- Kathrin Anklam-Trapp (born 1968), German politician
- Kathrin Beck (born 1966), Austrian athlete in figure skating
- Kathrin Becker (fl. 2000s), head of the Video-Forum at the Neuer Berliner Kunstverein (NBK) in Berlin since 2001
- Kathrin Born-Boyde (born 1970), German athlete in walk racing
- Kathrin Boron (born 1969), German athlete in rowing
- Kathrin Bringmann (born 1977), German professor (Mathematics)
- Kathrin Brown, any of several women with the name or variants
- Kathrin Dienstbier (fl. 1980s), German athlete in rowing
- Katrin Dörre-Heinig (born 1961), German athlete in long-distance running
- Kathrin Entner8), Austrian athlete in football
- Kathrin Freudelsperger (born 1987), Austrian athlete in figure skating
- Kathrin Gabler (born 1984), German Egyptologist
- Kathrin Gebel, German politician
- Kathrin Giese, East German sprint canoeist who competed in the early to mid-1980s
- Kathrin Haacker (born 1967), German athlete in rowing
- Kathrin Hammes (born 1989), German road bicycle racer
- Kathrin Hölzl (born 1984), German alpine ski racer, the gold medalist in the giant slalom at the 2009 World Championships
- Kathrin Johnson, any of several women with the name or variants thereof
- Kathrin Klaas (born 1984), German track/field athlete (hammer throw)
- Kathrin Krahfuss (born 1985), Austrian representative in Miss World 2008
- Kathrin Lang ((née Hitzer; born 1986), German biathlete
- Kathrin Längert (born 1987), German athlete in football
- Kathrine Maaseide (born 1976), Norwegian athlete in 2004 Olympics (beach volleyball)
- Kathrin Menzinger (born 1988), Austrian dancer
- Kathrin Michel (born 1963), German politician
- Kathrin M. Moeslein (born 1966), German professor (Business Administration)
- Kathrin Muegge, German physician and molecular biologist
- Kathrine Narducci (born 1965), United States actress in film and television
- Kathrin Neimke (born 1966), German track and field athlete
- Kathrin Passig (born 1970), German writer
- Kathrin Piotrowski (born 1980), German badminton player
- Kathrin Ress (born 1985), Italian professional basketball player in the WNBA
- Kathrin Schneider (born 1962), German politician
- Kathrin Stoll (fl. 1980s), East German sprint canoeist who competed in the early 1980s
- Kathrin Weiss (fl. 1970–80s), Swiss athlete in slalom canoeing
- Kathrin Weßel (née Ullrich; born 1967), retired German long-distance runner who specialized in the 10,000 metres
- Kathrin Wörle-Scheller (born 1984), professional German tennis player
- Kathrin Zettel (born 1986), Austrian alpine skier from Göstling, in Scheibbs
- Kathrin Zimmermann (born 1966), East German athlete in swimming

== See also ==
- Bonjour Kathrin – Caterina Valente präsentiert ihre größten Erfolge, an album from Caterina Valente
