= The Danish-UK Chamber of Commerce =

UK-Denmark partnership

- Det dansk-britiske handelskammer
- Company Logo
- Founded: 1989
- Location: 55, Sloane Street, London, SW1X 9SR
- Director: Gunnar P. Larsen

The Danish-UK Chamber of Commerce (DUCC) was set up to enhance the Anglo-Danish marketplace through networking. The Royal Danish Embassy in London was one of the co-founders. To this day, the aim of the DUCC remains to promote trade and investment between Denmark and the UK by providing companies from both countries with a business forum in the UK.

== Network ==
The Chamber serves a network of student, individual, and corporate members from small, medium, and large businesses. As of 2013, the organization had approximately 150 corporate members from Denmark, the United Kingdom, and other nations interested in British-Danish trade. Notable corporate members have included Lego, Carlsberg, and Danfoss.

== Events ==
The primary platform for the Chamber's activities is the 30-40 events hosted throughout the year. The events are wideranging from casual drinks receptions to business seminars to Dinners. Topics are carefully selected to be of interest to the British-Danish business community with prominent speakers from the worlds of business and politics are invited. The events provide Members and the extended network with opportunities of networking in both formal and informal settings.

== Chairmanship ==
- 2012–present Louis de Courcy Wheeler
- 2000 - 2012 Per Troen

== Council members ==
- Louis Wheeler (Chairman)
- Ulrick Walther (Treasurer)
- Benedikte Malling Bech
- Brent Cheshire
- Conny Kalcher
- Dennis Englund
- Hans Christian Iversen
- Helle Sejersen Myrthue
- Henrik Skourup Hansen
