= Kristina Miskowiak Beckvard =

Danish diplomat

Her Excellency Kristina Miskowiak Beckvard R.
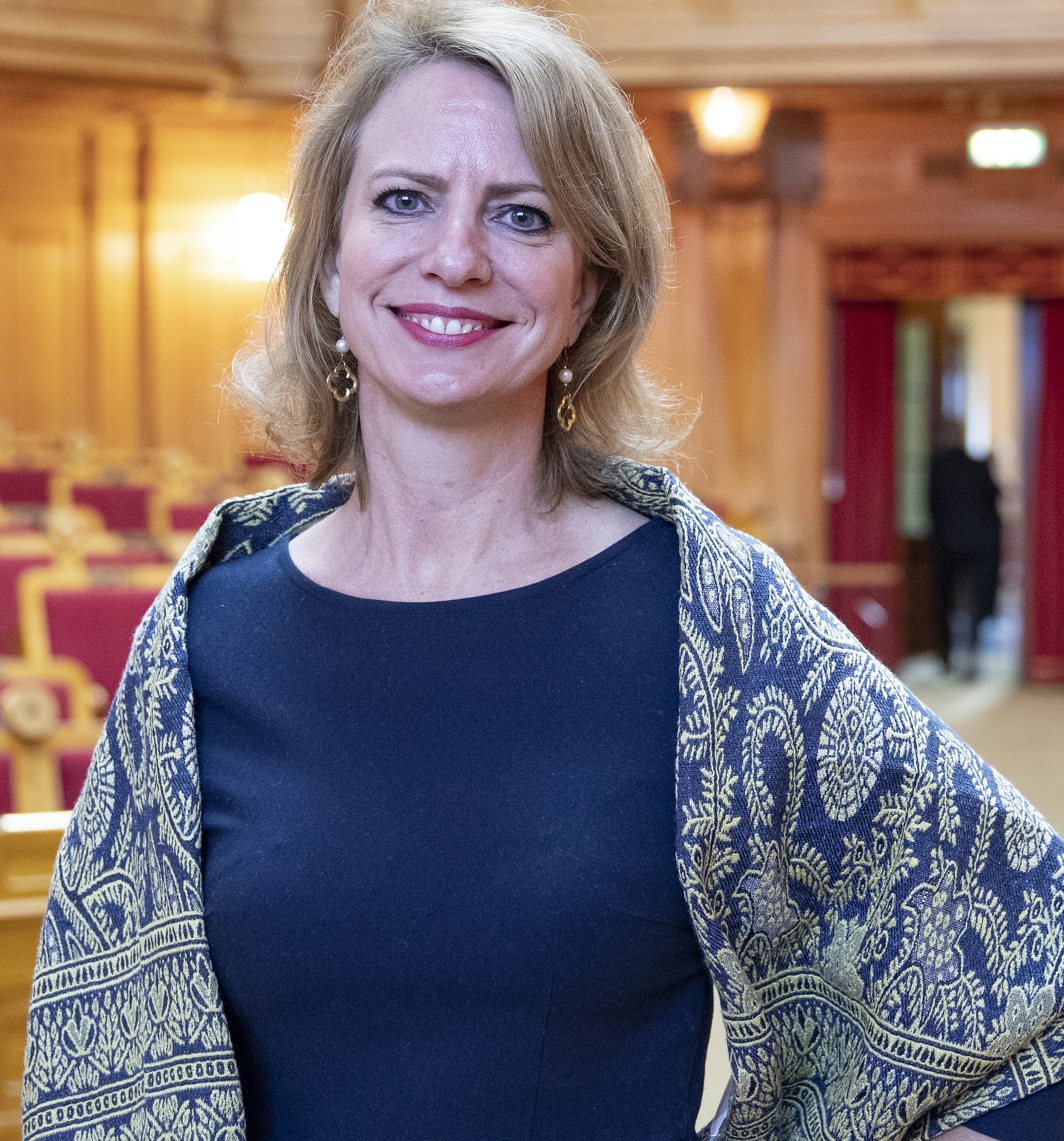
- Kristina Miskowiak Beckvard in 2022.

Ambassador of Denmark to the United Kingdom
- Incumbent
- Assumed office 1 September 2025
- Monarch: Frederik X
- Prime Minister: Mette Frederiksen
- Preceded by: René Rosager Dinesen

Ambassador of Denmark to Sweden
- In office 1 September 2022 – 1 September 2025
- Monarchs: Margrethe II; Frederik X
- Prime Minister: Mette Frederiksen
- Preceded by: Vibeke Rovsing Lauritzen
- Succeeded by: Jens Kisling

Ambassador of Denmark to Estonia
- In office 1 September 2017 – 1 September 2022
- Monarch: Margrethe II
- Prime Minister: Lars Løkke Rasmussen; Mette Frederiksen
- Preceded by: Søren Kelstrup
- Succeeded by: Niels Boel Abrahamsen

Personal details
- Born: Kristina Miskowiak; 7 April 1972 (age 54) Vejle, Denmark
- Spouse: Henrik Beckvard
- Education: University of Copenhagen; Cambridge University; King's College, London

Kristina Miskowiak Beckvard (born 7 April 1972) is a Danish diplomat, jurist and civil servant. She is the current Ambassador of Denmark to the United Kingdom, having previously served as Ambassador of Denmark to Sweden and as the Ambassador of Denmark to Estonia.

== Early life and education ==
She was born Kristina Miskowiak on 7 April 1972 in Vejle, Denmark to Danish-Polish parents.

In 1997, she obtained a Master of Laws (cand.jur.) from the University of Copenhagen as well as a Master of Laws in public international law (LL.M.) from King's College, London. She also holds a Diploma in International Law from the University of Cambridge (1998).

== Diplomatic career ==
Beckvard began her diplomatic career at the Ministry of Foreign Affairs in September 1998. She has held various positions since, including First Secretary at the Permanent Representation to the OSCE and IAEA in Vienna. From 2008 to 2012, she served as Minister Plenipotentiary at the Embassy of Denmark in Paris. Beckvard then became the Chief Adviser at the Executive Secretariat of the Ministry of Foreign Affairs, a position she held from 2012 to 2014, where she assumed the position of Head of the Department for Northern Europe, from 2014 to 2016. She then became the Head of the Department for Public and Administrative Law, from 2016 to 2017.

=== Estonia ===
In 2017, Beckvard assumed her first ambassadorial appointment, becoming Ambassador of Denmark to Estonia, succeeding Søren Kelstrup.

Throughout her ambassadorship, Beckvard worked to further strengthen diplomatic ties between the two nations. In several articles, she highlighted the historical connections between Denmark and Estonia, including Denmark's support for Estonian independence and their collaboration in NATO's enhanced Forward Presence and Baltic Air Policing. Beckvard also emphasized the emotional impact of Russia's invasion of Ukraine on the Estonian people. During her tenure, Denmark celebrated 100 years of diplomatic relations with the Baltic countries, as well as the 800th anniversary of the descent of the Dannebrog to the Danish king in Estonia. The celebrations were marked with major public programmes and the attendance of Margrethe II, Ambassador Beckvard being in charge of the Danish preparations.

She was succeeded by Niels Boel Abrahamsen, as Danish ambassador to Estonia.

=== Sweden ===
In the 2022 ambassadorial reshuffle, Beckvard was appointed Ambassador of Denmark to Sweden, succeeding Vibeke Rovsing Lauritzen. She presented her credentials to Carl XIV Gustav on 30 September 2022. She served until 2025.

=== United Kingdom ===
In July 2025, Beckvard succeeded René Dinesen as Danish ambassador to the United Kingdom. On 6 November 2025, she was received by Charles III at Buckingham Palace, where she presented the letter of recall of her predecessor and her own letters of credence as ambassador to the Court of St James's.

During her tenure, Beckvard has promoted Danish art and design as instruments of cultural diplomacy. In 2026, she told the Financial Times that artworks displayed at the Danish embassy in London were selected to represent Denmark while avoiding overtly political or provocative imagery that could distract from diplomatic discussions.

== Honours ==
=== National ===
Denmark:

- Knight of the Order of the Dannebrog (2016).

=== Foreign ===
- France: Officer of the Order of National Merit.
- Sweden: Knight Grand Cross of the Order of the Polar Star.
