= Denmark–United Kingdom relations =

- Denmark: United Kingdom

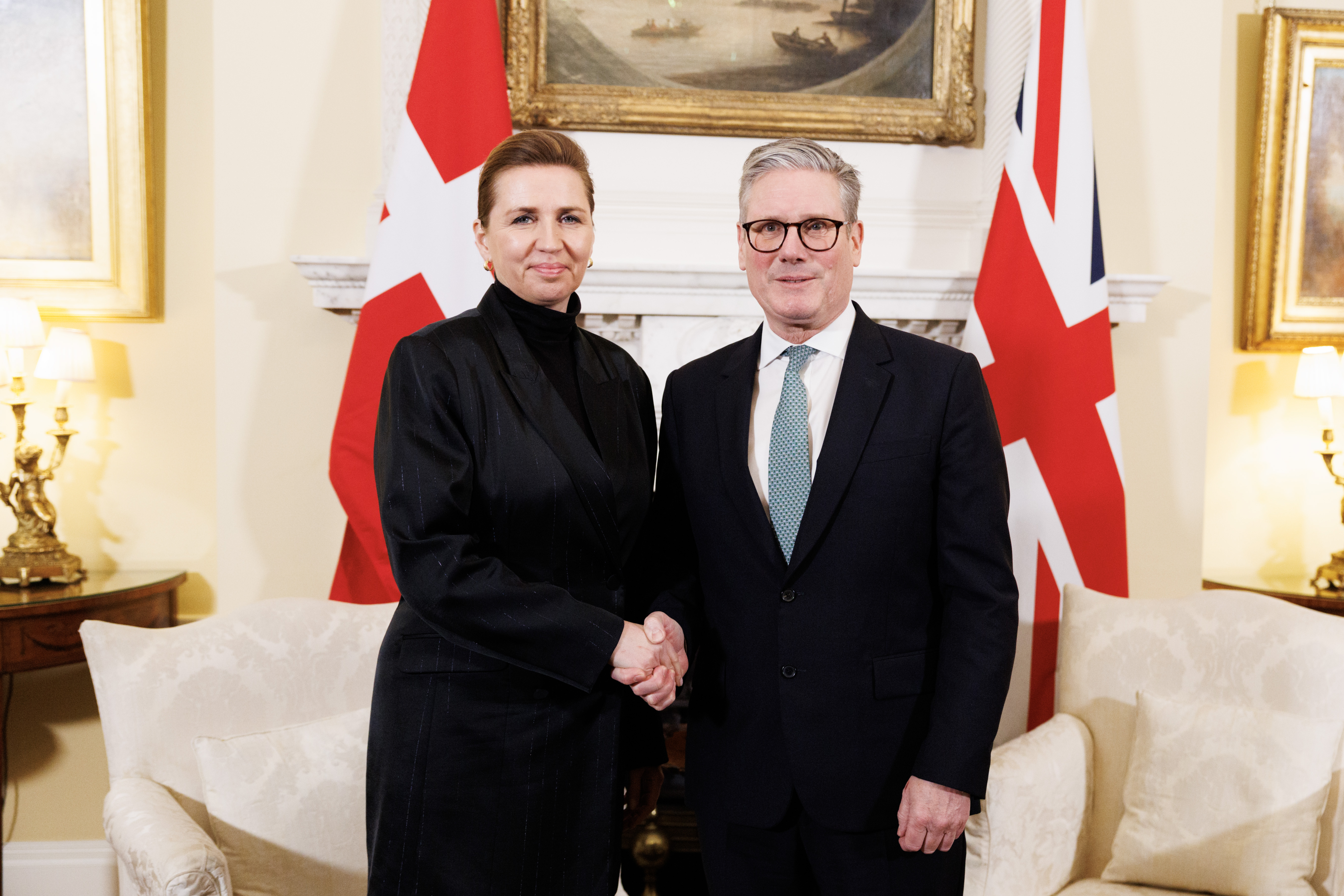
Danish Prime Minister Mette Frederiksen with British Prime Minister Keir Starmer in 10 Downing Street, February 2025.

Denmark–United Kingdom relations are foreign, economic, diplomatic, and historical relations between the Kingdom of Denmark and United Kingdom of Great Britain and Northern Ireland.

Both countries share common membership of the Council of Europe, the European Court of Human Rights, the International Criminal Court, the Joint Expeditionary Force, NATO, the OECD, the OSCE, the United Nations, and the World Trade Organization. Bilaterally the two countries have a Double Taxation Agreement, and a Voting Participation Agreement.

== History ==
=== Middle Ages ===
In addition, both countries' royal families are descended from the House of Glücksburg.

=== Gunboat War ===
The Battle of Copenhagen, 1801

Peace between Denmark and Great Britain was interrupted during the Napoleonic Wars. Denmark's participation in the anti-British Second League of Armed Neutrality worsened Anglo-Danish relations, and in 1801 a British fleet under Admiral Hyde Parker was sent to Copenhagen where it defeated the Danish navy; Denmark left the league after learning Paul I of Russia had died. Denmark nonetheless managed to remain uninvolved in the Napoleonic Wars until 1807. The British, who feared Denmark would ally with France, sent a fleet to Copenhagen; after the Danes refused to negotiate, the fleet bombarded Copenhagen and captured the entire Danish fleet so that it couldn't be used by France to invade Britain (as the French had lost their own fleet at Trafalgar in 1805), leading to the Gunboat War. The British navy began a blockade of the Danish and Norwegian coasts.

In 1809, Danish forces fighting on the French side participated in defeating the anti-Bonapartist German rebellion led by Ferdinand von Schill, at the Battle of Stralsund. By 1813, Denmark could no longer bear the war costs, and the state was bankrupt. When in the same year the Sixth Coalition isolated Denmark by clearing Northern Germany of French forces, Frederick VI had to make peace. Accordingly, the unfavourable Treaty of Kiel was concluded in January 1814 with Sweden and Great Britain, and another peace was signed with Russia in February.

The Treaty of Kiel transferred Heligoland to Great Britain and Norway from the Danish to the Swedish crown, Denmark was to be satisfied with Swedish Pomerania. But the Norwegians revolted, declared their independence, and elected crown-prince Christian Frederick (the future Christian VIII) as their king. However, the Norwegian independence movement failed to attract any support from the European powers. After a brief war with Sweden, Christian had to abdicate in order to preserve Norwegian autonomy, established in a personal union with Sweden. In favour of the Kingdom of Prussia, Denmark renounced her claims to Swedish Pomerania at the Congress of Vienna (1815), and instead was satisfied with the Duchy of Lauenburg and a Prussian payment of 3.5 million talers, also, Prussia took over a Danish 600,000 talers debt to Sweden.

Relations between the two countries were normalised as the nineteenth century progressed and they have remained cordial. In 1961, a maritime dispute over fishing rights off the Faroe Islands, led to the Red Crusader incident.

=== 21st century ===
The 2021 Baltic Sea incident was between British and Danish boats.

== Cooperation ==
Danish forces fought alongside British forces in operations in Iraq and they continued this cooperation in Afghanistan. Denmark and United Kingdom work closely together on counter-terrorism issues.

== State visits ==
Queen Margrethe II of Denmark paid state visits to the United Kingdom in April/May 1974, and in February 2000. Queen Elizabeth II of the United Kingdom paid state visits to Denmark in May 1957, and in May 1979.

On 19 August 2010, Danish Prime Minister Lars Løkke Rasmussen visited London, to meet British Prime Minister David Cameron. On 1 October 2022, British Prime Minister Liz Truss welcomed Danish Prime Minister Mette Frederiksen to 10 Downing Street.

== Resident diplomatic missions ==
- Denmark maintains an embassy in London.
- The United Kingdom is accredited to Denmark through its embassy in Copenhagen.
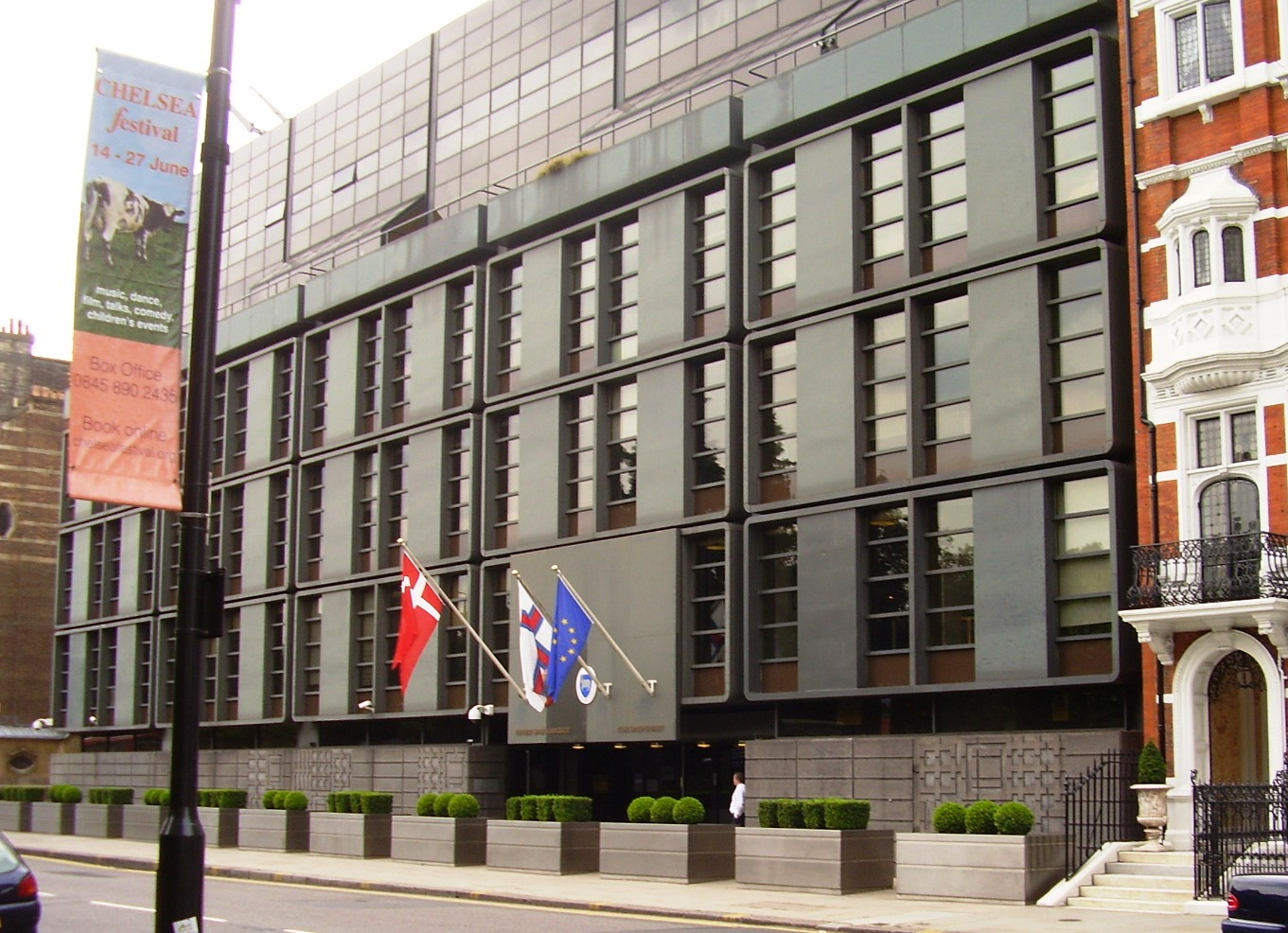
Embassy of Denmark in London

== See also ==
- EU–UK Trade and Cooperation Agreement
- European Union–United Kingdom relations
- Foreign relations of Denmark
- Foreign relations of the European Union
- Foreign relations of the United Kingdom
- Nordic and Scandinavian diaspora in the United Kingdom
