= Denmark–Sweden relations =

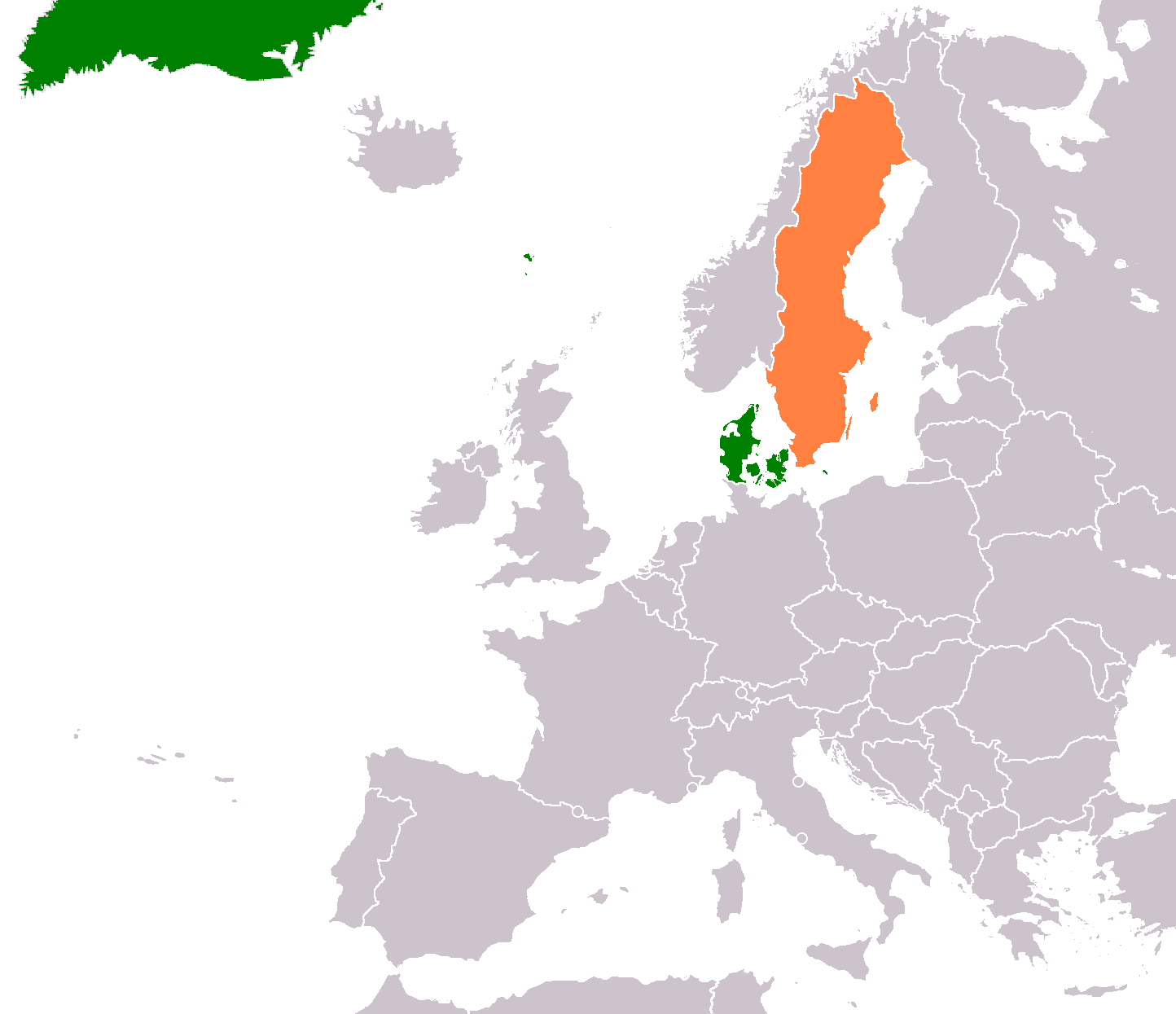
- Denmark: Sweden

Envoy
- Ambassador of Denmark to Sweden, Kristina Miskowiak Beckvard: Ambassador of Sweden to Denmark, Charlotte Wrangberg

The relations between Denmark and Sweden span a long history of interaction. The inhabitants of each speak related North Germanic languages, which have a degree of mutual intelligibility. Both countries formed part of the Kalmar Union between 1397 and 1523, but there exists an inherited cultural competition between Sweden and Denmark. From 1448 to 1790 the two kingdoms went to war against each other at nearly every opportunity; in more than one case a new king tried to prove his worth by waging war on the other country for little or no political reason. Several Dano-Swedish wars took place between 1521 and 1814.

Today, the countries are separated by the Øresund, which links the Baltic Sea and the North Sea. Denmark has an embassy in Stockholm and 2 consulates-general (in Gothenburg and Malmö). Sweden has an embassy in Copenhagen and 16 honorary consulates. Both countries are full members of the Nordic Council, of the Council of the Baltic Sea States, of the Council of Europe, Joint Expeditionary Force, European Union and NATO. Around 21,000 Swedish people live in Denmark and around 42,000 Danish people live in Sweden.

== Historic conflicts ==
Since Gustav Vasa consolidated the Swedish nation-state after the break-up of the Kalmar Union in 1523, Sweden and Denmark have fought several wars.

=== Second Northern War ===
The Second Northern War (1655–60) was fought between Sweden and its adversaries the Polish–Lithuanian Commonwealth (1655–60), Russia (1656–58), Brandenburg-Prussia (1657–60), the Habsburg monarchy (1657–60) and Denmark–Norway (1657–58 and 1658–60). The Dutch Republic often intervened against Sweden.

In 1655, Karl X Gustav of Sweden invaded and occupied western Poland-Lithuania, the eastern half of which was already occupied by Russia. The rapid Swedish advance became known in Poland as Swedish Deluge. The Grand Duchy of Lithuania became a Swedish fief, the Polish-Lithuanian regular armies surrendered and the Polish king John II Casimir Vasa fled to the Habsburgs. Frederick William, Elector of Brandenburg and Duke of Prussia initially supported the estates in Royal Prussia, but allied with Sweden in return for receiving the Duchy of Prussia as a Swedish fief. Exploiting the hurt religious feelings of the Roman Catholic population under Protestant occupation and organizing Polish-Lithuanian military leaders in the Tyszowce Confederation, John II Casimir Vasa managed to regain ground in 1656. Russia took advantage of the Swedish setback, declared war on Sweden and pushed into Lithuania and Swedish Livonia.

Charles X Gustav then granted Frederick William I full sovereignty in the Duchy of Prussia in return for military aid, and in the Treaty of Radnot allied himself with the Transylvanian George II Rákóczi who invaded Poland-Lithuania from the southeast. John II Vasa found an ally in Leopold I of Habsburg, whose armies crossed into Poland-Lithuania from the southwest. This triggered Frederick III of Denmark's invasion of the Swedish mainland in the spring of 1657, in an attempt to settle old scores from the Torstenson War while Sweden was busy elsewhere. Brandenburg left the alliance with Sweden when granted full sovereignty in the Duchy of Prussia by the Polish king in the treaties of Wehlau and Bromberg.

==== Dano-Swedish War (1658–60) ====
The Dano-Swedish War of 1658–60 was a war between Denmark–Norway and Sweden. It was a continuation of an earlier conflict between the two belligerents which had ended just months earlier, after Sweden and Denmark brokered a peace agreement in Roskilde in 1658. In the aftermath of that conflict, the Swedish king Charles X Gustav desired to add the province of Royal Prussia in Poland to the Swedish realm, but his position in the region was not strong enough with the opposition of Brandenburg and Austria. However, the Danes stalled and prolonged the fulfillment of some provisions of the earlier peace; the Swedish king decided to use this as a pretext to attack with an ambitious goal: to vanquish Denmark as a sovereign state and raze the capital of Copenhagen. A quick and decisive defeat of Denmark was however only seen as a means to a greater end. The long-term goal was to wage war in Europe without fearing Danish interference.

=== Scanian War ===
The Scanian War (1675 to 1679) was a part of the Northern Wars involving the union of Denmark–Norway, Brandenburg and Sweden. It was fought mainly on Scanian soil, in the former Danish provinces along the border with Sweden and in Northern Germany. While the latter battles are regarded a theater of the Scanian war in English, Danish and Swedish historiography, they are seen as a separate war in German historiography, called the Swedish-Brandenburgian War.

The war was prompted by the Swedish involvement in the Franco-Dutch War. Sweden had allied with France against several European countries. The United Provinces, under attack by France, sought support from Denmark–Norway. After some hesitation, King Christian V started the invasion of the Scania (Skåneland) in 1675, while the Swedish were occupied with a war against Brandenburg. The invasion of Scania was combined with a simultaneous Norwegian front called the Gyldenløve Wae, forcing the defending Swedes to fight a two-front war in addition to their entanglements in the Holy Roman Empire.

== Cultural links ==
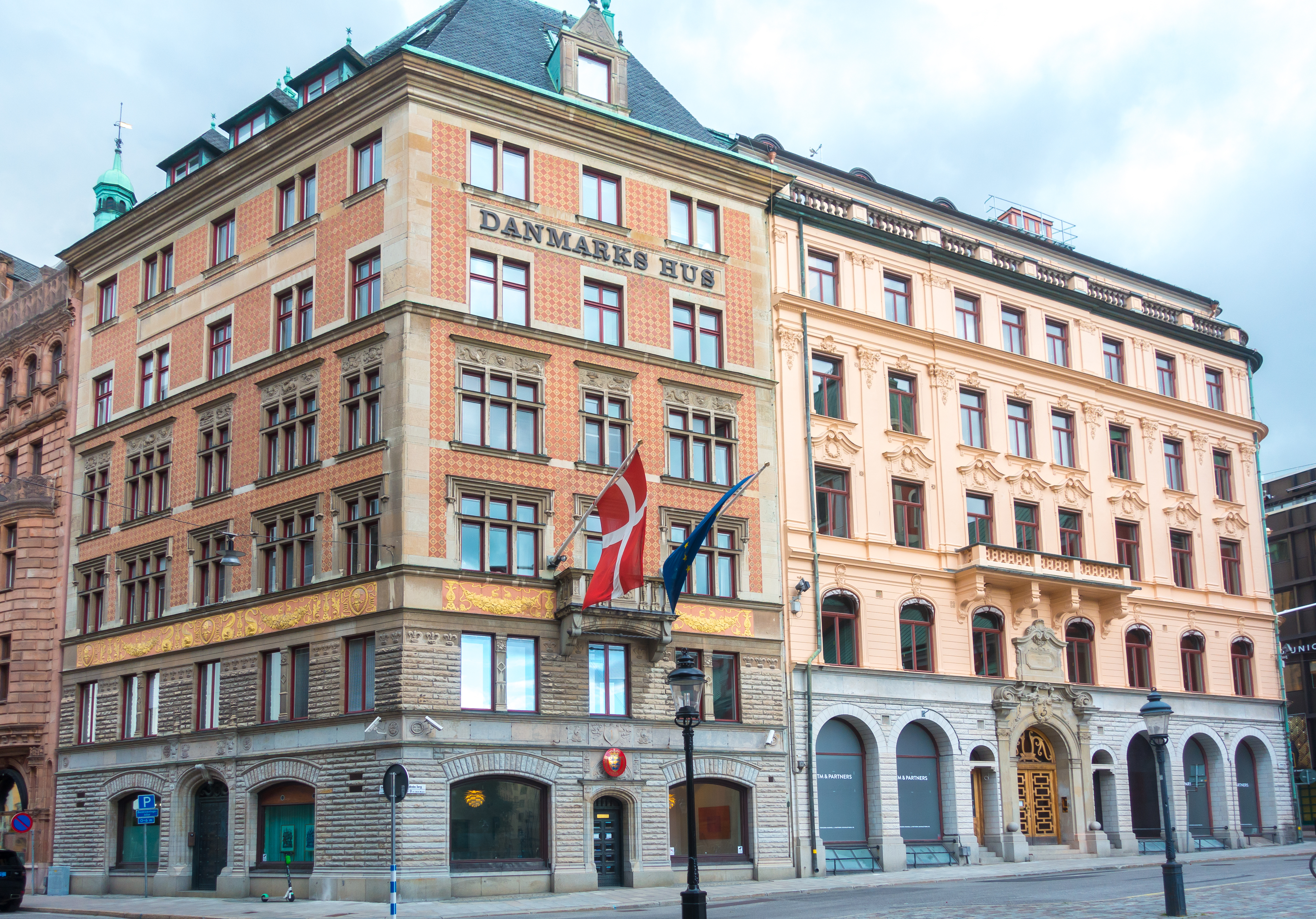
Embassy of Denmark in Stockholm

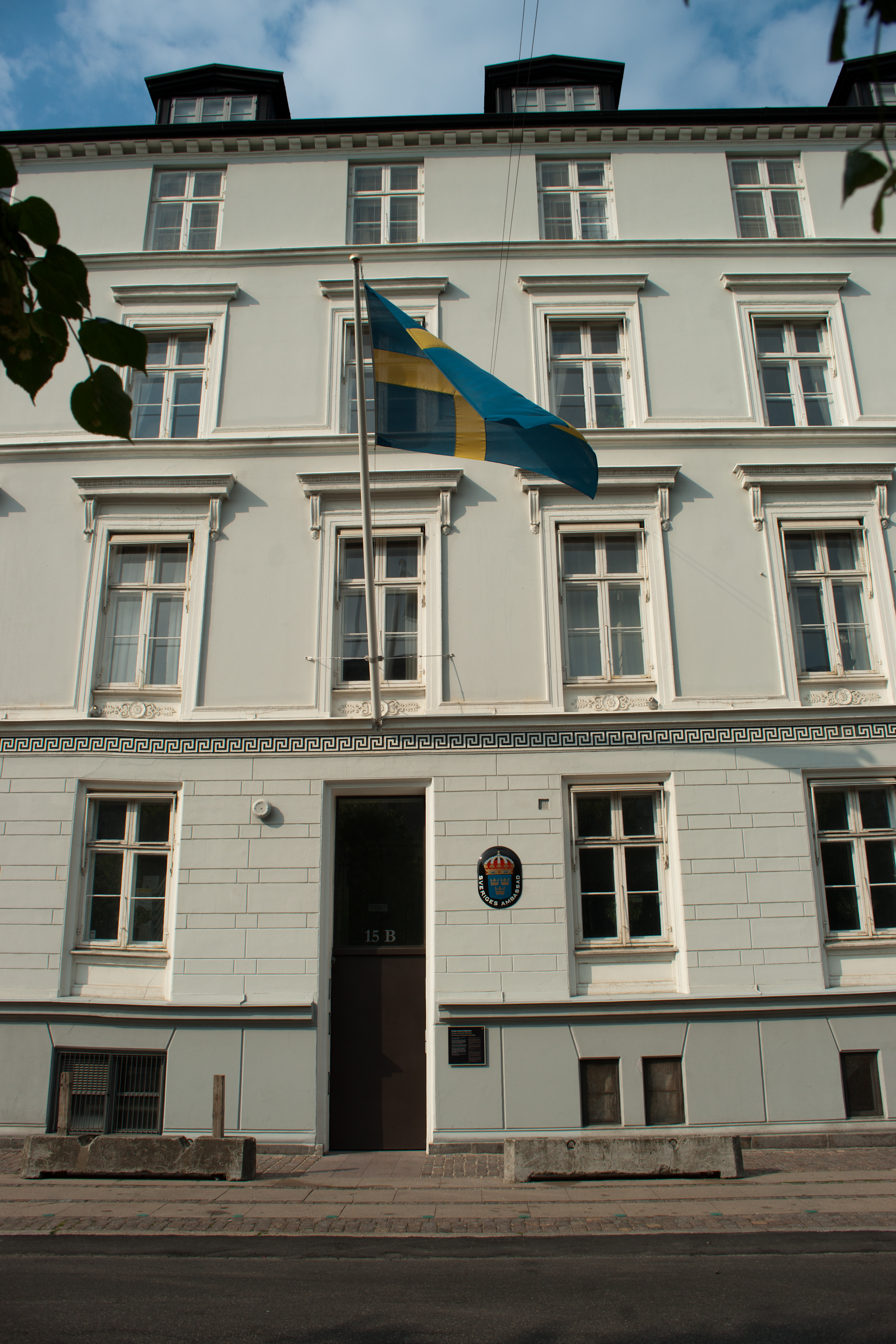
Embassy of Sweden in Copenhagen

There are extensive cultural links between Denmark and Sweden. Skåneland (Blekinge, Bornholm, Halland and Scania) used to be an integral part of Denmark. At the Second Treaty of Brömsebro in 1645, Halland was transferred to Sweden for 30 years. At the Treaty of Roskilde in 1658, Halland became a permanent part of Sweden. Blekinge, Bornholm and Scania also became Swedish in 1658. However, the Treaty of Copenhagen in 1660 restored Bornholm to Denmark.

The construction of the Øresund Bridge has rekindled ties between the nations, with the creation of the Øresund Region as the transnational metropolitan area comprising Copenhagen and Malmö. In addition, many Swedes and Danes consider themselves culturally and historically linked, in large part because the languages are to some degree mutually intelligible.

Even in modern times, there have been serious talks of a Nordic Union, either within or in competition with the European Union, and a Nordic Passport Union has been in existence since 1952, allowing all citizens of the Nordic countries to travel freely without documents. Sweden has 16 honorary consulates (in Aabenraa, Aarhus, Aalborg, Esbjerg, Frederikshavn, Grenaa, Helsingør, Holbæk, Kolding, Nuuk, Nykøbing Falster, Odense, Rønne, Skagen, Tórshavn and Viborg).

== Resident diplomatic missions ==
- Denmark has an embassy in Stockholm.
- Sweden has an embassy in Copenhagen.

== See also ==
- History of Denmark
- History of Sweden
- Kalmar Union
- Swedish Gustaf's Church
- Denmark and Sweden football rivalry
