= Mati Vaarmann =

Estonian diplomat

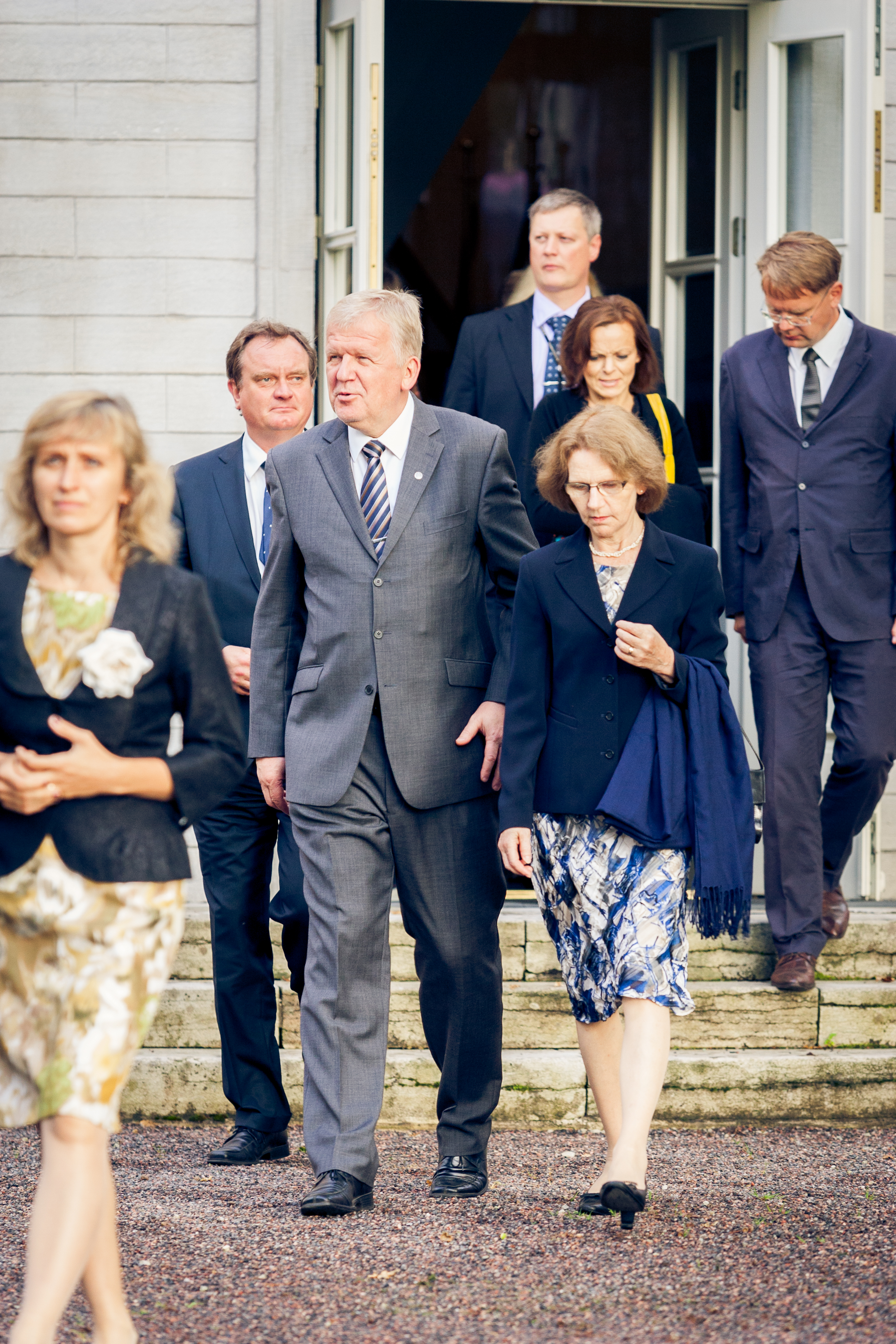
Mati Vaarmann and Meelike Palli

Mati Vaarmann (born 14 September 1951) is an Estonian diplomat.

In 1973 he graduated from Tallinn Polytechnical Institute.

Since 1992, he has been working for the Estonian Foreign Ministry. 1997-2001 he was the Ambassador of Estonia to Finland. Since 2010 he was Ambassador of Estonia to Latvia.

In 2006, he was awarded with Order of the White Star, III class.
