= Katrin Lux =

Austrian actress

Katrin Lux (née Ritt; born 25 March 1980, Kirchdorf an der Krems, Upper Austria) is an Austrian actress.

== Life ==
At the age of 16, Katrin Ritt was already working as a model. Before devoting herself to acting, she completed vocational training as an office clerk at her parents' request. In 1998, she was cast for the lead role in the film The Price of Innocence out of 3,000 applicants. She completed the Performing Arts School and then a Hollywood Acting Workshop in Los Angeles in 1999. She also received private acting and singing lessons, the latter with Klaus Ofczarek (classical music) and Ruth Hohmann (jazz).

Ritt has appeared in films and series such as Tatort, Preis der Unschuld, Die Strandclique, Unter weißen Segeln, Hanna - Folge deinem Herzen and others. From 2005 to 2011, she played Yasemin Garcia in the television series Marienhof in almost 300 episodes, with one interruption. Between August 2013 and November 2021, she appeared in the series Dahoam is Dahoam on Bavarian television as cook "Fanny Lechner".

In December 2003, Ritt married her first husband. On 18 February 2008, she gave birth to a daughter. In August 2013, she married a second time and has been known as Katrin Lux ever since. She lives with her husband in Germany.

== Filmography (selection) ==
- 1998: Lieselotte (TV movie)
- 1999: Preis der Unschuld (as Maria Berger)
- 1999: Medicopter 117 - Jedes Leben zählt - Unter Verdacht
- 1999: Schlosshotel Orth - Außer Konkurrenz
- 2000: Club der starken Frauen - Die rote Meile (2 Episoden)
- 2001: SOKO Kitzbühel - Tod bei Tisch
- 2001: Reise des Herzens (TV movie)
- 2001: Anwalt des Herzens (TV movie)
- 2002: Die Strandclique (6 episodes)
- 2002: Dolce Vita & Co - The Band
- 2003: Für alle Fälle Stefanie (3 episodes)
- 2004: Tatort - Tod unter der Orgel
- 2004: Der Landarzt - Zwei gute Freunde
- 2004: Tatort - Tödliche Tagung
- 2004: Familie auf Bestellung (TV movie)
- 2004: Beauty Queen - Der Traumfuß
- 2005: Unter weißen Segeln - Abschiedsvorstellung
- 2005-2011: Marienhof
- 2009: Lilly Schönauer - Paulas Traum
- 2010: SOKO 5113 - Schmarotzer
- 2012: Die Rosenheim-Cops - Der große Preis von Rosenheim
- 2013: SOKO 5113 - Große Jungs
- 2014: SOKO 5113 - Auf Abwegen
- 2016: Dahoam is Dahoam - Der Weihnachtsalarm
- 2016: SOKO Donau - Stiller Abgang
- 2017: SOKO Kitzbühel - Hexenjagd
- 2017: Hubert und Staller - Das letzte Kapitel
- 2020: Der Alte - Chancenlos
- 2022: Der Bergdoktor - Spiel mit dem Feuer
- 2023: Snow (television series)
- 2023: Polizeiruf 110 - Little Boxes
- 2023: Weihnachtspäckchen ... haben alle zu tragen

== Publications ==
- Mild & Wild - Mit Katrin Lux durchs Mostviertel, 2016 ISBN 978-3-942194-20-4
