= Katrín =

- Gender: Female

Other names
- Related names: Katherine, Catherine

Katrín is a feminine given name. It is an Icelandic form of Katherine. Notable people with the name include:

- Katrín Ásbjörnsdóttir (born 1992), Icelandic footballer
- Katrín Axelsdóttir (1956–1994), Icelandic multi-sport athlete
- Katrín Davíðsdóttir (born 1993), Icelandic CrossFit athlete
- Katrín Lea Elenudóttir (born 1999), Icelandic model
- Katrín Fjeldsted (born 1946), Icelandic politician and medical doctor
- Katrín Jakobsdóttir, Prime Minister of Iceland from 2017 to 2024
- Katrín Jónsdóttir (born 1977), Icelandic footballer
- Katrín Júlíusdóttir (born 1974), Icelandic politician
- Katrín Magnússon (1858–1932), Icelandic feminist
- Katrín Ómarsdóttir (born 1987), Icelandic footballer
- Katrín Sigurdardóttir (born 1967), Icelandic sculptor

- Hanna Katrín Friðriksson (born 1964), Icelandic politician and businesswoman
- Þorgerður Katrín Gunnarsdóttir (born 1965), Icelandic politician
- Guðrún Katrín Þorbergsdóttir (1934–1998), First Lady of Iceland from 1996 to 1998

== See also ==
- KATRIN, experiment to measure the mass of the electron neutrino with sub-eV precision
- Katharine
- Katrina
- Katrin
- Catherine
