= Sinking of the Spanish trawler Sonia =

Ship sinking off County Wexford, Ireland

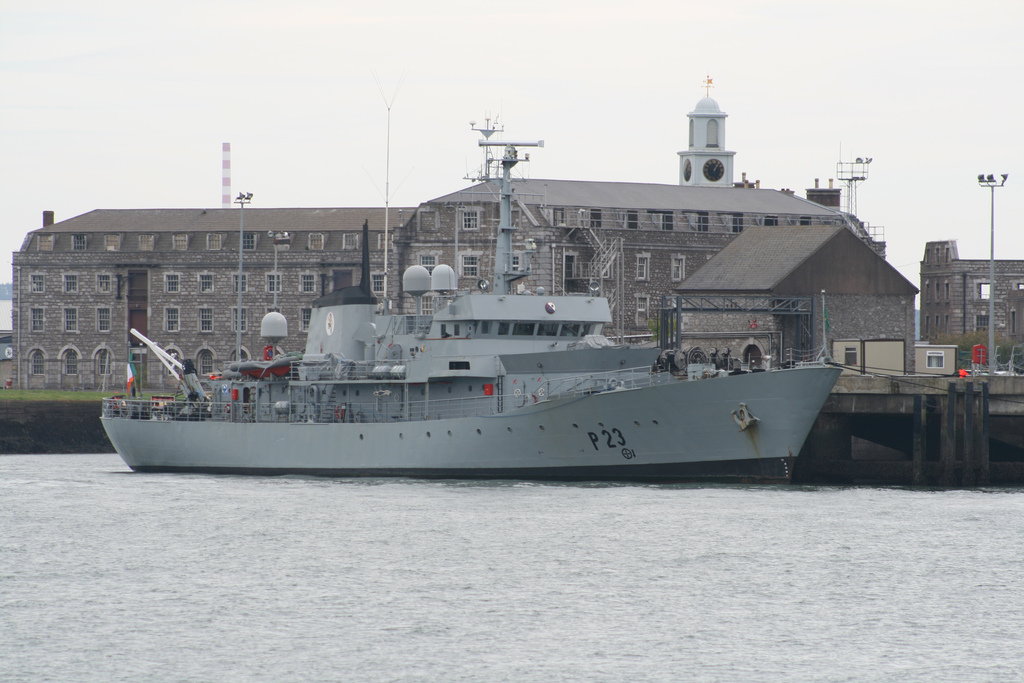
LÉ Aisling pictured in 2007

The Spanish fishing trawler Sonia sank off the Cornish coast of England on 20 October 1984. On 19 October, in Irish territorial waters off the coast of County Wexford, the Sonia had been spotted by the Irish Naval Service patrol vessel Aisling and was suspected to be fishing illegally. The Sonia was ordered to halt and prepare to receive a boarding party, but did not comply.

The Aisling pursued the Sonia for five hours, during a force 8 gale. The crew of the Aisling fired almost 600 rifle, machine-gun and autocannon rounds during the pursuit, initially as warning shots, but soon targeting the trawler itself. The pursuit was called off after both vessels entered the British exclusive economic zone (EEZ). Some seven hours later, just after midnight on the morning of 20 October, the Sonia broadcast a distress signal stating that she was taking on water. An RAF Search and Rescue Force helicopter was mobilised and picked up thirteen of her crew; the remaining three were rescued by the West German cargo vessel Achat. The Sonia sank soon afterwards.

The Aisling's actions in carrying out the pursuit were legal under the 1958 Convention on the High Seas, as the Sonia had been ordered to stop in Irish territorial waters. Although it was not clearly defined in the law of the time, maritime law writer Clive Ralph Symmons considers that the amount of force used by the Aisling's crew was proportionate and legal. Symmons considered that the right of the Aisling to continue the pursuit into the British EEZ was not clear in international law, but Robin Churchill and Alan Lowe writing in The Law of the Sea (1999) state that it is legal to do so.

The sinking happened during negotiations for Spain to join the European Economic Community, while Ireland held the presidency of the bloc, with disagreements over access to fisheries being a key sticking point in the negotiations.

== Background ==
The EEC in 1984

Fisheries in Europe became increasingly restricted after the European Economic Community (EEC) imposed limits on fishing in its member states' territorial waters from the mid-1970s. Spain, which was not an EEC member at the time, had a larger fishing fleet than any member of the bloc and Spanish fishermen sometimes clashed with EEC nations' fisheries protection vessels. The Sonia was a 330-tonne fishing trawler based out of Ondarroa in the Basque Country. Other Ondarroan vessels had clashed with French warships in March 1984 while fishing illegally in French territorial waters; nine Spaniards were wounded when a non-explosive cannon shot hit the deck of their vessel. Spain made a formal diplomatic protest to France over the incident, stating that the French response was disproportionate to the alleged offence.

The Ondarroa fishermen afterwards switched to fishing the waters around the British Isles. There was increased scrutiny from the British and Irish authorities at this time due to the use of fishing trawlers to smuggle arms and explosives to the Provisional Irish Republican Army (IRA). On 29 September 1984 the Irish trawler Marita Ann was intercepted by the Irish Naval Service patrol vessels Aisling and Emer. She was boarded after being fired upon and found to be carrying 7 long tons (7.1 t) of weapons, shipped from IRA sympathisers in Boston, United States. The five-man crew, including IRA member Martin Ferris, were arrested.

== Pursuit ==
On 19 October 1984 the Sonia was intercepted by the Aisling whilst fishing in Irish territorial waters 10 nautical miles (19 km; 12 mi) off the County Wexford coast, south of the Saltee Islands. The Irish accused the crew of the Sonia of fishing illegally and stated that the trawler was ordered by "all internationally recognised signals" to halt and prepare to be boarded. The Irish naval party was unable to board the Sonia due to rough seas and, they alleged, the intentional manoeuvring of the Spanish vessel.

The Irish Department of Defence stated that the Sonia attempted to ram the Aisling several times, though this was denied by the trawler's crew. A five-hour pursuit ensued during which the Irish vessel's crew fired warning shots from rifles and machine guns—the Aisling was equipped with two 7.62 mm machine guns—as well as from one or both of the ship's 20 mm (0.79 in) Rheinmetall Rh202 autocannons. The warning shots were aimed above and in front of the Sonia. When these were not heeded, shots were fired at the trawler, though aimed away from her crew. The Spanish crew later accused the Irish of opening fire without giving sufficient warning; they also stated that they were scared when the first shots were fired and decided to flee. The Irish Department of Defence stated after the event that only around 20 of the 596 rifle, machine-gun and 20 mm rounds fired during the chase hit the Sonia. A Spanish crewman on the Sonia claimed that her radio was destroyed by the initial shots and that the bridge was particularly damaged.

The then Spanish ambassador to Ireland, Luis Jordana de Pozas Fuentes, attempted to communicate with the captain of the Sonia via radio but was unsuccessful, allegedly because the crew refused to answer the call. The chase continued through a force 8 gale. The Irish Department of Foreign Affairs was consulted over whether the Aisling could receive permission to engage with her heavier 40 mm (1.6 in) Bofors L70 autocannon. It was decided that the use of the weapon might sink the Sonia and endanger her crew so was not approved. The pursuit was abandoned shortly after the Sonia and the Aisling entered the British exclusive economic zone.

It is not clear if the Aisling flew her battle ensign during the chase, but if so, it was the only occasion in her INS career where it was flown.

== Sinking ==
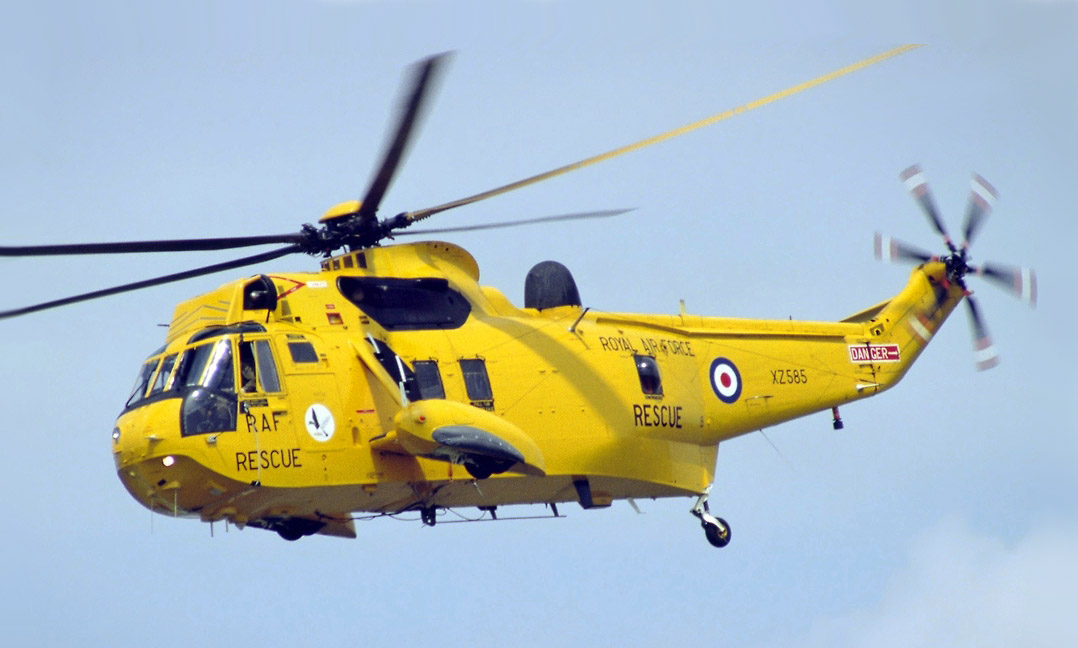
An RAF Search and Rescue Westland Sea King

Just after midnight on the morning of 20 October, around seven hours after entering British waters, the Sonia broadcast a distress signal from a position around 45 miles (72 km) north of Land's End in Cornwall, stating that the vessel was taking on water. The Aisling heard the call and altered course towards the scene to render assistance. The British authorities dispatched an RAF Search and Rescue Force Westland Sea King helicopter. At a point around 80 miles (130 km) off Trevose Head the Sea King winched off 13 of the 16 men aboard; the remaining three crew members, including the Sonia's captain, were rescued by the 995-ton West German cargo ship Achat. Jordana de Pozas Fuentes claimed that damage from the shots fired by the Aisling's crew was the cause of the sinking, though the Irish stated that the number of hits was not sufficient to cause the vessel to sink. No casualties were incurred during the chase or sinking.

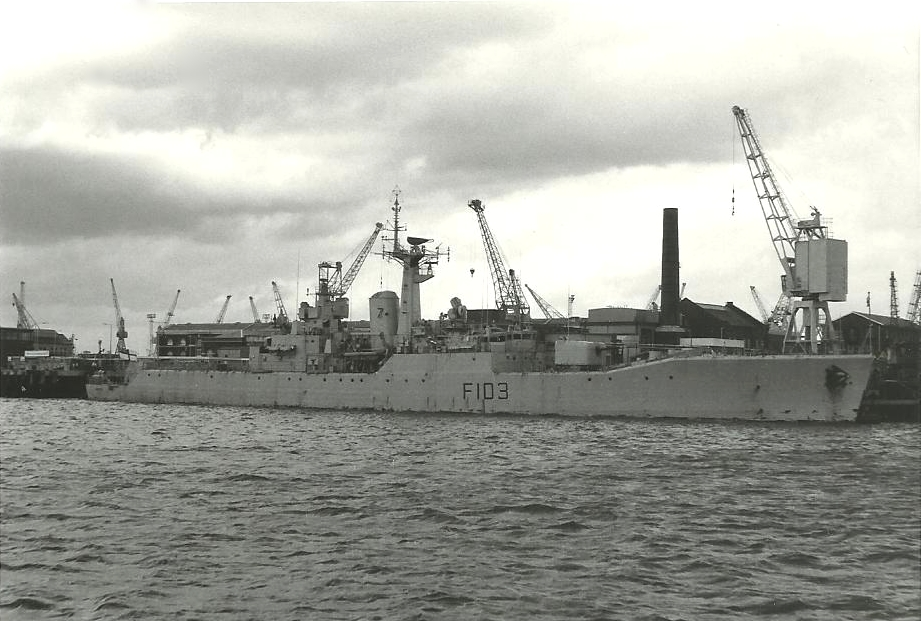
HMS Lowestoft pictured in 1982

The Sea King returned to a Royal Air Force base in the south-west of England and the 13 crew stayed overnight in Plymouth before being repatriated to Spain. The Achat continued to its next port of call, Waterford, Ireland, where the three rescued crew members of the Sonia were questioned by Irish police. The men admitted to fishing in Irish waters illegally but denied any involvement in arms smuggling and were released without charge. De Pozas Fuentes supported the actions of the Irish authorities and stated that the crew could face prosecution upon their return to Spain. The British frigate HMS Lowestoft searched for the abandoned Sonia, but no wreckage was found and the vessel was presumed to have sunk.

The Sonia was the 33rd Spanish trawler to be ordered to halt for inspection by an Irish vessel in the preceding year, but was the first not to comply with the order. The incident was embarrassing for the Irish authorities, as at the time Ireland held the rotating presidency of the EEC and was involved in negotiations with Spain over their application to join the bloc. Fishing-access rights were a key obstacle in the negotiations and the Sonia incident led to calls from the Irish Fisherman's Organisation for Spanish vessels to be banned from Irish waters even after they joined the EEC. The negotiations proceeded and Spain joined the EEC, with no fishing restrictions, in 1986. The Spanish authorities made a cursory inquiry into the incident but no action was taken and no diplomatic protest was lodged with the Irish ambassador. The Irish Department of Foreign Affairs lodged a formal protest with the Spanish government over the incident. There is no record of any British protest over the continuation of the pursuit into the British EEZ.

== Legal implications ==
It had long been recognised that warships held the right of "hot pursuit" of foreign vessels in their territorial waters, 12 nautical miles (22 km; 14 mi) from the coast. This right was originally held only under customary law but was codified in article 23 of the 1958 Convention on the High Seas. The right was extended to the contiguous zone, 24 nautical miles (44 km; 28 mi) from the coast, in the 1982 United Nations Convention on the Law of the Sea (UNCLOS), but this did not enter into force until 1994.

Hot pursuit rights permit a warship to pursue a foreign vessel, which is under reasonable suspicion of having committed an offence, into international waters. The law extends the jurisdiction of the pursuing state over the pursued vessel which otherwise, in international waters, would be subject only to the laws of its flag state. The Sonia case is one of the few hot pursuit cases in Irish history, though a British fishing vessel escaped after being fired upon in 1954 and a French trawler was apprehended after being shot in 1973.

In 1993, marine law writer Clive Ralph Symmons wrote about the incident. He noted that the pursuit began in Irish territorial waters in accordance with the law. Symmons stated that although there were few guidelines at the time as to how force should be applied during hot pursuits, it was clear that excessive force was illegal under international law. The limits of force had been discussed by commissions of enquiry following the 1929 sinking of the Canadian yacht I'm Alone by the US Coast Guard and the opening of fire upon the British trawler Red Crusader in 1961 by the Royal Danish Navy. Symmons considered that the amount of force used by the Aisling during the pursuit was justified and its actions legal. Robin Churchill and Alan Lowe, writing in The Law of the Sea (1999), considered that reasonable force might include that which results in the sinking of the pursued vessel.

Symmons noted that the Sonia was pursued into the British EEZ, and that these zones are not discussed by hot pursuit clauses, even in UNCLOS which was written after the widespread adoption of the EEZ. Symmons considered that under the law of the time, hot pursuit rights might have extended to foreign EEZs. Since 1992, INS policy has been to not carry out hot pursuits in foreign EEZs, though they appear to permit foreign vessels to continue pursuits into the Irish EEZ. Churchill and Lowe consider that hot pursuit into foreign EEZs remains legal under international law.
