= Katrin Kneipp =

German physicist

Prof Katrin Kneipp
- Education: Friedrich Schiller University
- Alma mater: Humboldt University Berlin
- Scientific career
- Institutions: Danish Technical University

Katrin Kneipp is a German physicist.

== Biography ==
Kneipp was born in Thuringen and studied physics at Friedrich Schiller University and Humboldt University Berlin. She was an associate professor at Harvard University Medical School and has been a visiting professor at MIT.

She has written about her memories of Millie Dresselhaus.

== Research ==
She works on single-molecule Raman spectroscopy spectra and Surface-enhanced Raman spectroscopy (SERS), as well as bio-medically relevant molecules.

== Honours and awards ==
- 2004 – Fellow of the American Physical Society for "contributions to the application of Raman scattering in nanotechnology and the biomedical field."
- Fellow of the Society for Applied Spectroscopy
- 2000 - Rockefeller-Mauze visiting chair award at Massachusetts Institute of Technology
- 1999 - Meggers award of the Society for Applied Spectroscopy

== Selected publications ==
=== Books edited ===
- Recent developments in plasmon-supported Raman spectroscopy: 45 years of enhanced Raman signals. New Jersey London Singapore Beijing Shanghai Hong Kong Taipei Chennai Tokyo: World Scientific. 2018. ISBN 9781786344236.
- Kneipp, Katrin; Moskovits, Martin; Kneipp, Harald (20 November 2010). Surface-Enhanced Raman Scattering: Physics and Applications. Springer. ISBN 9783642070167.
- New approaches in biomedical spectroscopy. Washington (D.C.): American chemical society. 2007. ISBN 9780841274372.
- Surface - enhanced Raman scattering: physics and applications. Berlin Heidelberg: Springer. 2006. ISBN 9783540335665.
- Frontiers of surface-enhanced Raman scattering: single-nanoparticles and single cells. Chichester: Wiley. 2014. ISBN 9781118359020.

=== Selected papers ===
- Kneipp, Katrin; Wang, Yang; Kneipp, Harald; Perelman, Lev T.; Itzkan, Irving; Dasari, Ramachandra R.; Feld, Michael S. (3 March 1997). "Single Molecule Detection Using Surface-Enhanced Raman Scattering (SERS)". Physical Review Letters. 78 (9): 1667–1670. Bibcode:1997PhRvL..78.1667K. doi:10.1103/PhysRevLett.78.1667.
- Kneipp, Janina; Kneipp, Harald; Kneipp, Katrin (2008). "SERS—a single-molecule and nanoscale tool for bioanalytics". Chemical Society Reviews. 37 (5): 1052–1060. doi:10.1039/B708459P. PMID 18443689.
- Kneipp, Katrin; Kneipp, Harald; Itzkan, Irving; Dasari, Ramachandra R; Feld, Michael S (13 May 2002). "Surface-enhanced Raman scattering and biophysics". Journal of Physics: Condensed Matter. 14 (18): R597 – R624. doi:10.1088/0953-8984/14/18/202.
