= Katrin Schindele =

German politician (born 1987)

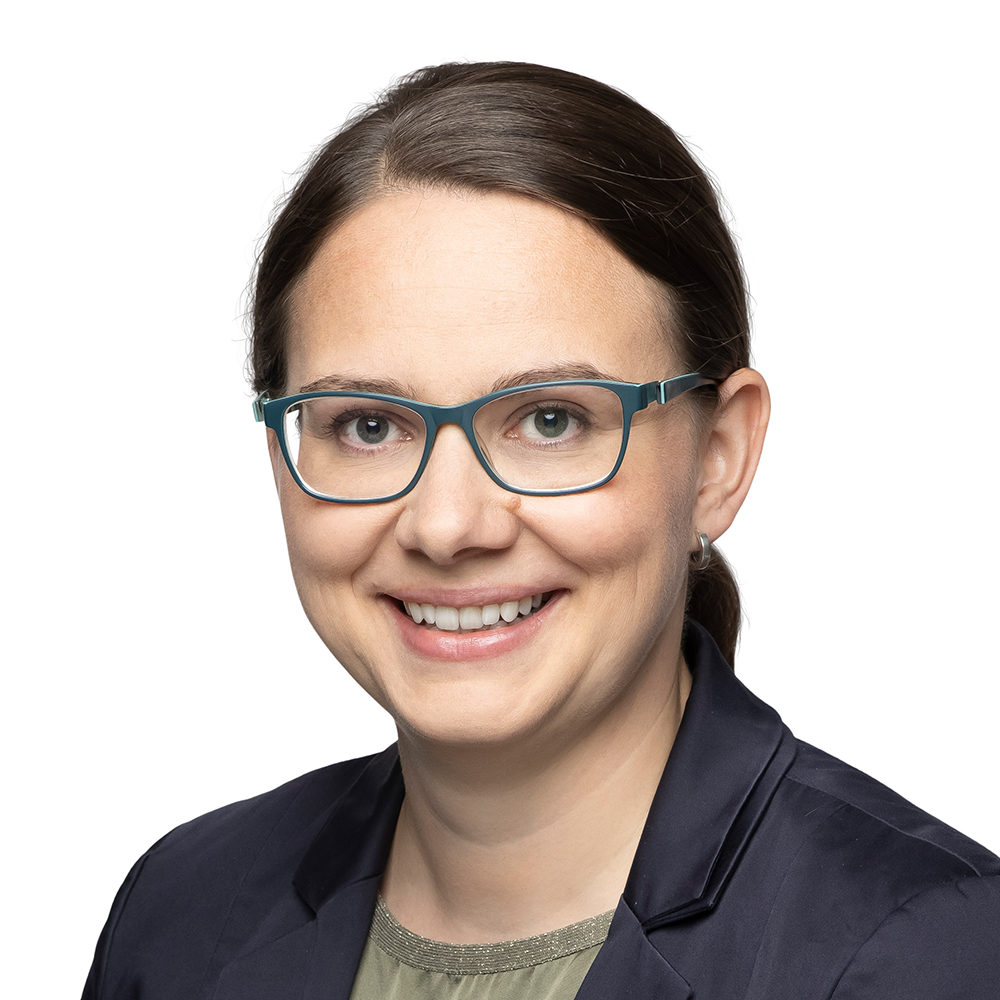
- Schindele in 2021

Member of the Landtag of Baden-Württemberg
- Incumbent
- Assumed office 14 April 2021
- Constituency: Freudenstadt

Personal details
- Born: 16 November 1987 (age 38) Freudenstadt
- Party: Christian Democratic Union (since 2015)

Katrin Schindele (born 16 November 1987 in Freudenstadt) is a German politician serving as a member of the Landtag of Baden-Württemberg since 2021. She has served as chairwoman of the Christian Democratic Union in Freudenstadt since 2020.
