= Kathrin Muegge =

German physician and molecular biologist

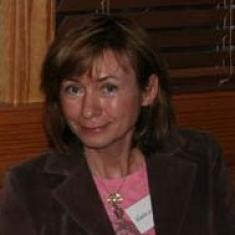
- Education: Hannover Medical School (MD)
- Scientific career
- Fields: Molecular biology, epigenetics, cancer research
- Workplaces: Frederick National Laboratory for Cancer Research

Kathrin Muegge is a German physician and molecular biologist researching chromatin organization during embryonic development and in tumor progression. She is a senior investigator and head of the epigenetics section at the Frederick National Laboratory for Cancer Research.

== Education ==
Kathrin Muegge obtained a M.D. degree at the Hannover Medical School. As a postdoctoral researcher, she worked on cytokines and T cell development in the National Cancer Institute (NCI) Laboratory of Molecular Immunoregulation of Joost J. Oppenheim and Scott K. Durum.

== Career and research ==
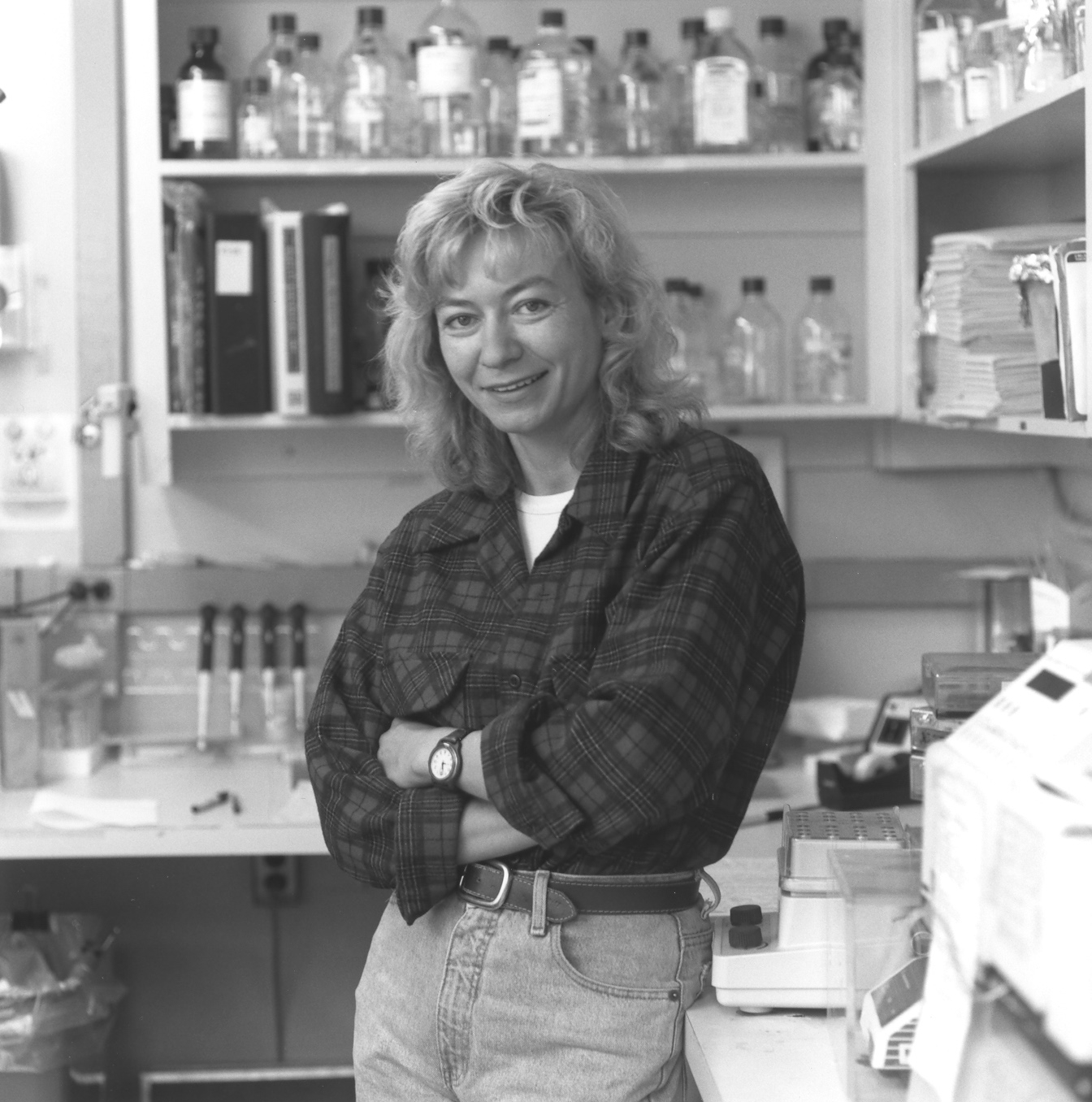
Muegge in October 1995

As a principal investigator at the Frederick National Laboratory for Cancer Research she investigates in the Laboratory of Cancer Prevention chromatin organization during embryonic development and in tumor progression. She is a senior investigator in the mouse cancer genetics program and head of the epigenetics section.

Muegge studies molecular mechanisms that alter chromatin structure and function during murine development. She discovered several links between chromatin modifiers, including nucleosomal remodeling and DNA methylation. The work focuses on chromatin changes during normal cellular differentiation and during the reverse process of nuclear reprogramming. Her studies provide insights how stable gene expression is achieved, how cells maintain a proper phenotype, and how this process may be disturbed in pathologic conditions including cancer.
