= Kathrin M. Moeslein =

German professor for business administration

Kathrin M. Moeslein (germ.: Kathrin M. Möslein) (born May 4, 1966) is a professor for business administration at the University of Erlangen–Nuremberg in Bavaria, Germany.

== Biography ==
Kathrin M. Möslein studied informatics with a minor in business administration at the Technical University of Munich (TUM), LMU Munich, and ETH Zurich. She graduated from TUM in 1993 and earned her Ph.D. in 1999. In 2004, she became professor for business administration at the same university. From 2003 to 2005, she contributed, as associate director, to the formation of the Advanced Institute of Management Research (AIM) at London Business School. In 2005, she was appointed to the Chair for Strategic Management and Organization at Leipzig Graduate School of Management (HHL) and contributed to the formation of the Center of Leading Innovation & Cooperation (CLIC) at HHL in 2006. As of 2007, Kathrin M. Möslein has been the head of the Chair of Information Systems I – Innovation and Value Creation at Friedrich Alexander University Erlangen-Nuremberg.

== Research ==
Kathrin M. Möslein has been researching and teaching in the field of strategic innovation, cooperation and leadership, as well as their IT-implementation within corporations. Her courses are about interactive value creation, innovation design, as well as the development and implementation of both innovation strategies and leadership systems. Since 2008, dean for research at the faculty of business economics at Friedrich Alexander University Erlangen-Nuremberg, and since 2010, research fellow at Leipzig Graduate School of Management as well as Visiting International Fellow at the Advanced Institute of Management Research (AIM) in London. Kathrin M. Möslein has been president and vice president of the European Academy of Management (EURAM), an organization she has co-founded, many times. For her achievements, she has accessed to a Fellowship of EURAM, a distinguished award granted by the EURAM College of Fellows coming with substantial prize money financed by EURAM membership and conference fees.

== Selected publications ==
- Möslein, K. M. & Matthaei, E. E.: Strategies for innovators: HHL Open School Case Book Wiesbaden: Gabler Verlag 2009 ISBN 978-3-8349-0761-5
