= Katrin Lögering =

German politician (born 1990)

Member of the Landtag of North Rhine-Westphalia
- Incumbent
- Assumed office 1 July 2026
- Preceded by: Anja von Marenholtz

Personal details
- Born: 1990 (age 35–36)
- Party: Alliance 90/The Greens

Katrin Lögering (born 1990) is a German politician serving as a member of the Landtag of North Rhine-Westphalia since 2026. She has served co-group leader of Alliance 90/The Greens in the city council of Dortmund since 2023.
