= Mart Laanemäe =

Estonian diplomat

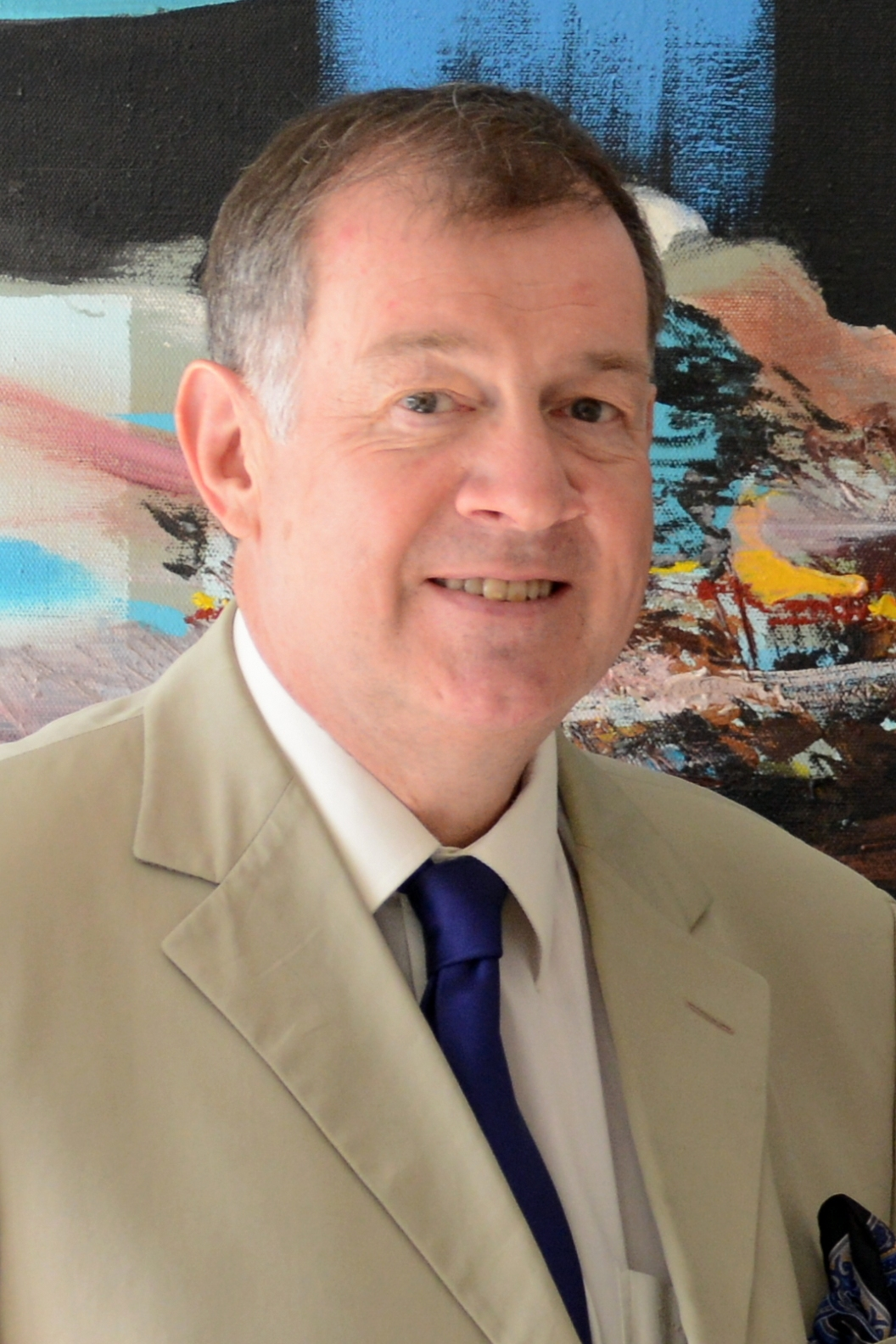
Mart Laanemäe

William Mart Laanemäe (born in 1959 in Vancouver, Canada) is an Estonian diplomat.

Since 1999 he has worked for Estonian Ministry of Foreign Affairs.

== Diplomatic posts ==
- 1999-2003 Ambassador to Austria, Slovakia, Slovenia, Switzerland. 1999-2001 also Ambassador to Hungary and the Czech Republic
- 2004-2008 non-resident ambassador to Serbia and Montenegro
- 2008-2012 Ambassador to Germany
- 2016-2019 Ambassador to Germany

In 2007 he was awarded with Order of the White Star, IV class.
