= Pamela Fitzgerald (camogie) =

Irish camogie player

Pamela Fitzgerald (born 1984 in Cork, Ireland) is a camogie player from Newcastle West, Co. Limerick, Ireland. She has played for her county at a number of levels, including senior camogie on three occasions. She also represents her hometown over the summer months, and captains the Trinity College camogie team during term time.

She is the Honorary Secretary of the Dublin University Central Athletic Club (DUCAC) Executive Committee, which oversees the 50 sporting clubs in Trinity.

In a March 2006 article by Trinity News, Fitzgerald was declared to be the 9th most powerful student in Trinity, the highest female on the list.
