= Katrin Fridriks =

Icelandic artist (born 1974)

- Born: 9 August 1974 (age 52); Reykjavík, Iceland
- Known for: Painting

Katrin Fridriks (born 9 August 1974) is an Icelandic abstract painter.

== Life ==
She was born on 9 August 1974 in Reykjavík.

== Work ==
Fusing the natural energies of her native Iceland with an explosive, however organic, abstract expressionism often filtered through painterly installations, Katrin Fridriks explores speed, gravity, and growth along with the interaction of man and nature in different media. One of her creations is installed at the Nautical stadium in Nîmes, but a section of her work connecting with land art has also been an important element in her process. Her painterly creations are often integrated into paintscapes, site-specific installation that exceed the limits of painting traditionally conceived.

Showcased among others in Venice in 2015 during the 56th Art Biennale and at the Reykjavík Art Museum, at the Arts Center in Seoul in 2013, as well as the Liverpool Biennale in 2008, her works are in public and private collections. Fridriks has also received commissions from Pictures on Wall in 2012, Michael Goss Foundation in 2011, Ralph Lauren in 2010, Bacardi Martini, Land Rover as well as the French Ministry for Youth & Sports in 2007.

== Commissions and exhibitions ==
=== Selected exhibitions ===
2017

- Solar Panel Art Series Tech Open Air – The Beam with Little Sun Foundation – Berlin
- Das Dasein Circle Culture gallery – Berlin
- Today's Abstract David Pluskwa gallery – Marseille
- Come Alive! Circle Culture gallery - Hamburg

2016

- Abstract Masters group show, Helene Bailly gallery – Paris
- ART16 duo show, Circle Culture gallery – London
- Macrocosm solo show, Lazarides gallery – London
- Still Here, A Decade of Lazarides gallery – London

2015

- "New Wave" solo show, Circle Culture gallery – Hamburg
- Art International, Circle Culture gallery – Istanbul
- Global Art Affairs Foundation & European Cultural Center – "Personal Structures – Crossing Borders" – Palazzo Bembo – Venice
- Reykjavík Art Museum – "Just Painted II" Kjarvalsstaðir – Reykjavík
- ART15 Circle Culture gallery – London

2014

- Art14 duo show, Circle Culture gallery – London
- Flying Awareness solo show, Lazarides gallery – London
- Solo show, Circle Culture gallery – Berlin

2013

- Brafa, Helene Bailly gallery – Brussels
- India Art Fair, Ltd gallery – New Delhi
- Art13, solo show, Circle Culture gallery – London
- Art Paris, Helene Bailly gallery – Paris
- "Brutal" Lazarides gallery – London
- "Potse68" Circle Culture gallery – Berlin

2012

- Design Days Dubaï, Stilwerk design gallery – Dubai
- "Escape the golden cage" – Vienna
- "Space//Form" curated by Sven Davis – Portland
- Circle Culture gallery @ The Burlington Social Club, Royal Academy - London

2011

- Soho House "Urban Artist" Circle Culture gallery – Berlin
- Circle Culture gallery "Leak of Information" solo show – Berlin
- Pascal Janssens gallery "Mothernature" solo show – Ghent
- Forum Grimaldi "40 ans du pressionnisme" – Monaco
- Goss-Michael Foundation / MTV "Re:define" – Dallas
- LeBasse gallery "The Future is not what it used to be" – Los Angeles
- The Border Contemporary art zone Lineart, solo show, Pascal Janssens gallery – Ghent

2010

- Circle Culture gallery – No such thing as good painting about nothing – Berlin
- Inauguration New Contemporary Art Center – Épinal
- Volta 6– Art Basel, Circleculture gallery – Basel
- Circle Culture gallery – Salon du Cercle de la Culture – Berlin
- Moniker Art Fair – "Project Space" solo show, Circleculture gallery – London
- The Border –Contemporary Art Zone Lineart solo show, Pascal Janssens gallery – Ghent

2009

- "Tag" Grand Palais – Paris
- CAL Salon 2009 – Luxembourg
- Bailly Contemporain – Salon du Collectionneur, Grand Palais – Paris

2008

- Center of Icelandic Art, SIM "Barbie-Q" – Reykjavík
- Biennial of Liverpool – Novas Contemporary Urban Centre "Nice08" – Liverpool
- Vigdís Finnbogadóttir Foundation – Reykjavík

2007

- eArts Festival "Digital Experience" curator for Visual Systems – Shanghai
- Palais Bénédictine "Mangeurs d'étoiles" solo show – Fécamp
- Ice07 Cultural & Art Festival – Liverpool
- Sequences Art Festival – Reykjavík

=== Commissions and grants ===
- CAB apart – special commission – glass and light installation – Luxembourg
- "Royale Gene&Ethics" black edition new print release – Lazarides edition – London
- Icelandic Art Center – Grant for the installation "Perception of the Stendhal Syndrome" – Venice
- MTV Re:Define 2014 – Goss Michael Foundation at Dallas Contemporary – Dallas
- Soho House Permanent collection (Nick Jones) curated by Francesca Gavin – London
- "100 Nike" Grazia Pop-up – Circle Culture agency – Berlin
- First silkscreen prints limited edition "golden awareness" Pictures on Walls – London
- Artcurial auction "100 briques" Hôtel Marcel Dassault – Paris
- Pierre Bergé auction "Empreintes urbaines" Palais d'Iéna – Paris
- Phillips de Pury auction, "MTV Re-Define" Goss Michael Foundation – Dallas
- Ralph Lauren, "Art Stars", Charity Teenage Cancer Trust, Phillips de Pury – London
- International Campaign Award "Land Rover 60 yrs" – Defender SVX 1/25 edition
- Biennial of Liverpool "Made up risk boxes" Grants by the Trade Council of Iceland
- Center for Icelandic Art – Liverpool
- Minister of Culture, Higher Education & Research: Catalog "Face" – Luxembourg
- Minister of Health, Youth & Sports' for the New Olympic Stadium of Nîmes, Fresco *"Red Sea" 80m², constructed by Bouygues & Architect BVL
- Bacardi Martini: customizing "special metal box" Bénédictine
