= Katrin Bühring =

German actress

Katrin Bühring, née Gohlke (born 16 May 1977, in Rathenow) is a German actress and screenwriter.

== Life ==
From 1983 to 1991, Bühring attended elementary school (24th Polytechnische Oberschule Hermann-Duncker) in Berlin-Friedrichsfelde. She then completed her A-levels in Berlin. From 1998 to 2001, Bühring studied acting at the Hanover University of Music and Drama. From 2001 to 2004, she had a permanent engagement at the Staatstheater Stuttgart. In the 2007/2008 season she was a guest at the Schauspielhaus Zürich, in 2008 she played at the Ruhrfestspiele Recklinghausen.

She already had role offers for film and television productions during her studies and has worked regularly for film and television since then. She lives as an actress and screenwriter in Berlin.

== Filmography (selection) ==
- 1998: Ein Mann fällt nicht vom Himmel (TV film)
- 2000: Anniversaries (TV multi-part)
- 2000: Eine Hand schmiert die andere (TV movie)
- 2001: Romeo (TV movie)
- 2002: Tatort: Oskar
- 2002: In einer Nacht wie dieser (TV movie)
- 2002: Poppen (short film, included on DVD of the movie Schule')
- 2004: Aller Tage Abend
- 2004: Der Ermittler - Schönheitsfehler (television series)
- 2005: Reblaus (television film)
- 2005: Stages (medium-length film)
- 2005: SOKO Köln - Tod auf der Lula (television series)
- 2006: Tod einer Freundin (TV movie)
- 2007: Die Todesautomatik (TV movie)
- 2008: In aller Freundschaft - Mehr als nur das (TV series)
- 2009: Familie Dr. Kleist - Chaos der Gefühle (TV series)
- 2009, 2020: SOKO Köln - Der Fluch der bösen Tat, Techtelmechtel (TV series)
- 2010: Fucked (short film)
- 2010: Der Alte - Rettungslos (TV series)
- 2010: Mord mit Aussicht - Nach 6 im Zoo (TV series)
- 2010: Großstadtrevier - Der Bluff des alten Li (TV series)
- 2011: Dating Lanzelot
- 2011: Tatort: Der schöne Schein
- 2011: Shadows In The Distance
- 2011: Room 7 (short film)
- 2012: Zu dir? (short film)
- 2012: Der Alte - Die Zeugin (television series)
- 2012: Coast Guard - In mörderischer Absicht (television series)
- 2013: Hauptstadtrevier - Offene Rechnungen (television series)
- 2014, 2023: SOKO Leipzig - Kranke Gier, Froschköniginnen (television series)
- 2014: Dina Foxx: Deadly Contact (television movie)
- 2014: SOKO Wismar - Der Stachel in mir (television series)
- 2015: Letzte Spur Berlin (TV series, episode Hochvirulent)
- 2015: In aller Freundschaft - Die jungen Ärzte (TV series, episode Deep Wounds)
- 2015: Commissioner Dupin: Breton Gold
- 2016: Die Pfefferkörner - Toms Vater (television series)
- 2016: Mama told me not to look into the sun
- 2017-: Wojenne dziewczyny (Polish television series)
- 2017: Alarm for Cobra 11 – The Highway Police (television series, episode Ghosts of the Past)
- 2017: Polizeiruf 110: In Flammen (television series)
- 2018: Wilsberg: Prognose Mord (television series)
- 2018: Jenny: Echt gerecht (television series)
- 2018, 2024: SOKO Stuttgart - Seitenwechsel, An der Angel (television series)
- 2019: Erzgebirgskrimi - Der Tote im Stollen (television series)
- 2020: Under Other Circumstances: Beyond Death (television series)
- 2020: In aller Freundschaft: Free Decisions (television series)
- 2020: Heldt: Treppe abwärts (television series)
- 2022: Muspilli

== Screenplay ==
- 2017: Ich will (k)ein Kind von Dir (TV movie)

== Awards ==
- Fernsehfilmpreis der Deutschen Akademie der Darstellenden Künste 2001, Special Actor Award for Romeo
- Adolf-Grimme-Preis 2002 for her acting performance in Romeo
