= Taavi Toom =

Estonian diplomat (born 1970)

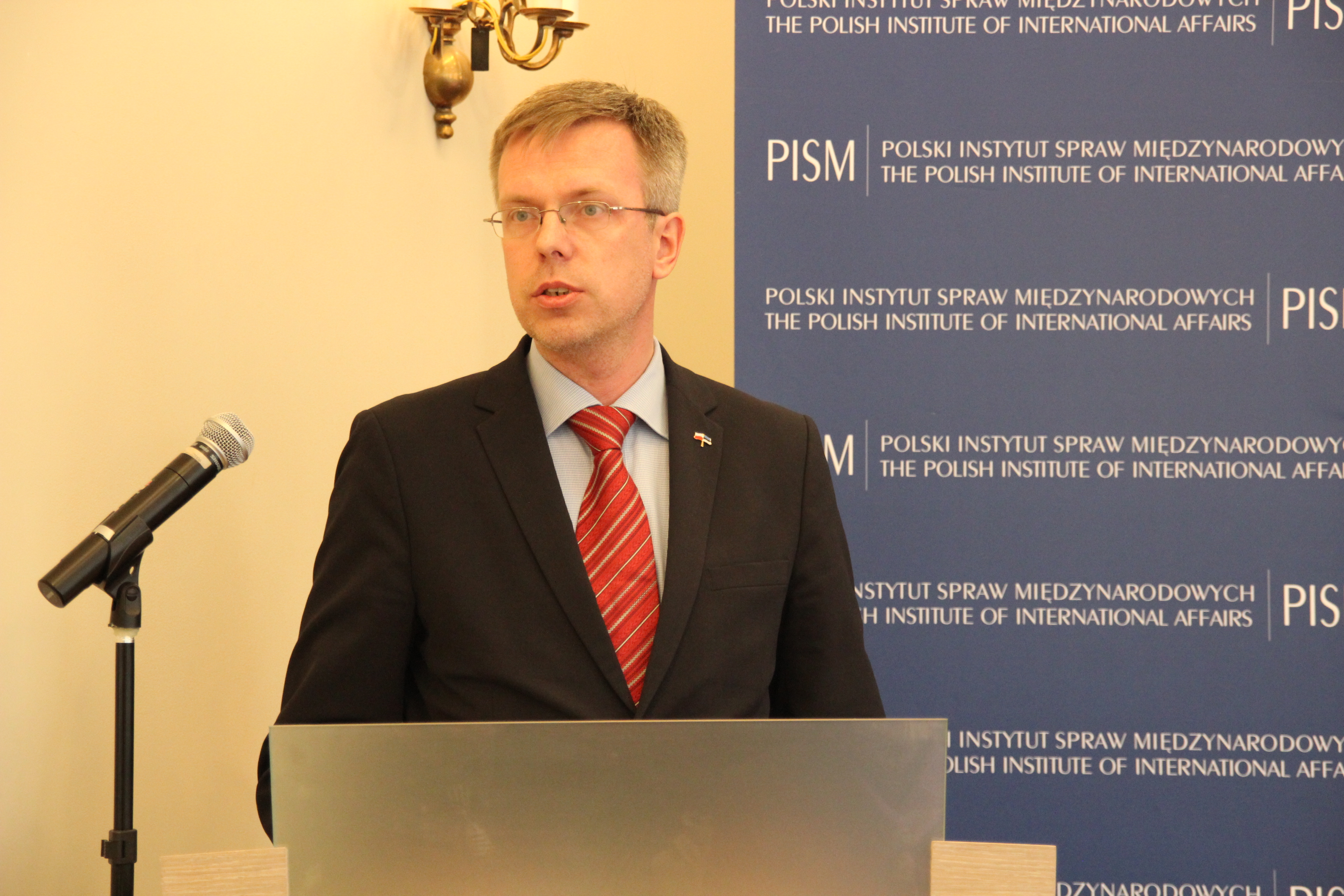
Taavi Toom

Taavi Toom (born 7 September 1970 in Tartu) is an Estonian diplomat.

In 1993 he graduated from University of Tartu with a degree in law. Since 1994 he has worked for the Estonian Foreign Ministry.

2001-2006 he was Ambassador of Estonia to Denmark. Since 2009 he is Ambassador of Estonia to Poland.
