= Meelike Palli =

Estonian diplomat and philologist

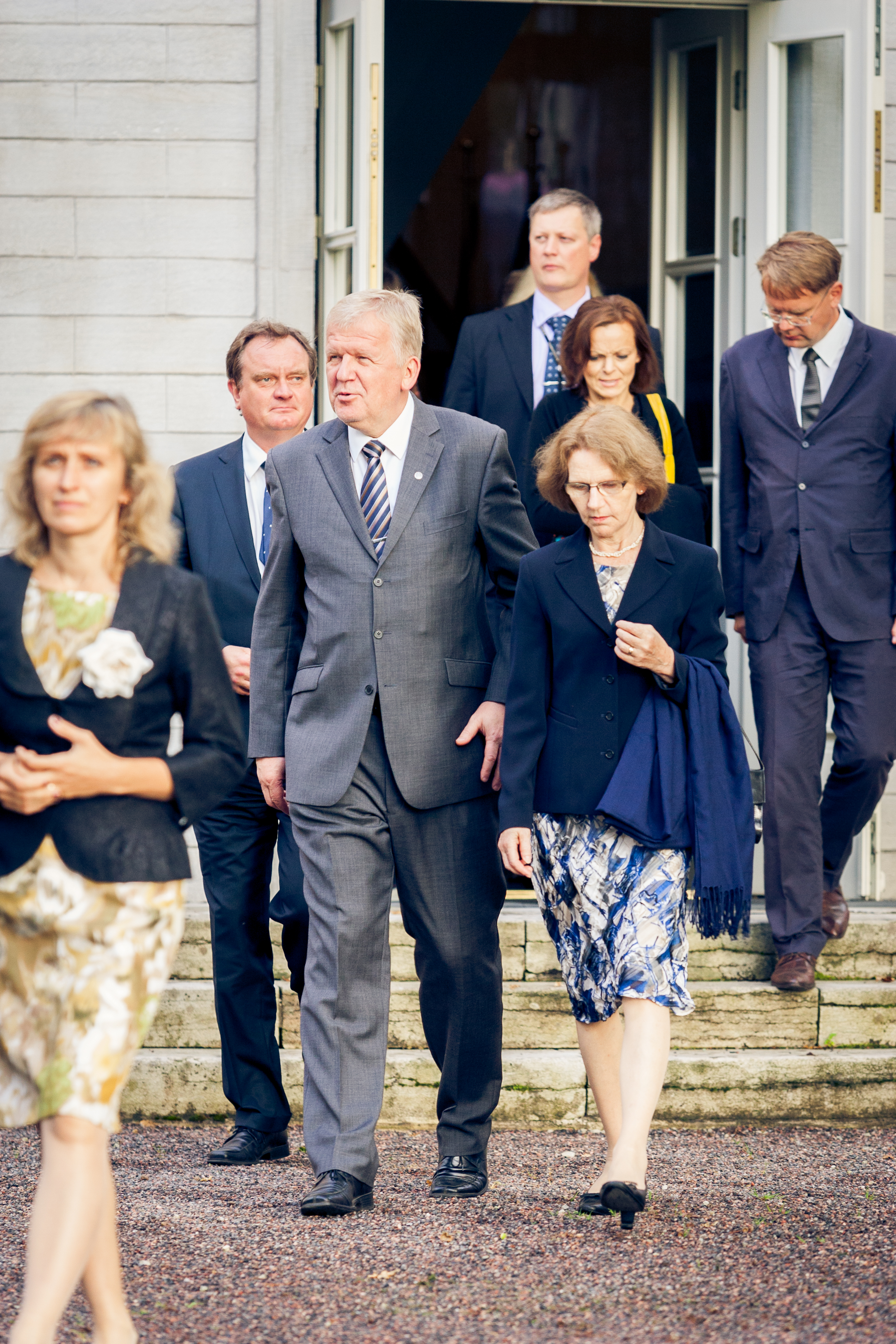
Meelike Palli and Mati Vaarmann

Meelike Palli (born 20 August 1954) is an Estonian diplomat, philologist and translator.

In 1977 she graduated from Tartu State University. 1977–1992 she worked at Estonian National Library. In 1992 she started to work for Estonian Foreign Ministry. 1997–1999 she was chargé d'affaires ad interim of Estonia in Portugal. Since 2006 she was Ambassador of Estonia in Denmark.

In 2005 she was awarded with Order of the White Star, III class.
