= Die Strandclique =

- Country of origin: Germany

Die Strandclique is a German television series.

== See also ==
- Gegen den Wind (1994 – 1997)
- List of German television series
