= Red Crusader incident =

1961 maritime dispute between Denmark and the UK

Map showing Denmark (green) and the United Kingdom (orange)

The Red Crusader incident (Danish: Red Crusader-sagen) was a 1961 maritime dispute between Denmark and the United Kingdom over fishing rights.

== Background ==
On 27 April 1959, the British and Danish governments exchanged notes in Copenhagen establishing temporary regulations on fishing around the Faroe Islands.

== Events of 29 May ==
On 29 May 1961 at 17:39, the British fishing trawler Red Crusader was detained by the Danish frigate Niels Ebbesen for fishing in the waters off the Faroe Islands after a chase. Instead of heading towards Tórshavn, as instructed by Niels Ebbesen, Red Crusader headed for Scotland. The frigate pursued the trawler, and fired warning shots to no avail. Niels Ebbesen then fired an aimed shot, damaging Red Crusader. The commander of the frigate was E. Sølling and the captain of the trawler was a Mr. Wood.

== Commission ==
On 15 November 1961, the British and Danish governments established an adversarial international commission of inquiry into the incident under the auspices of the Permanent Court of Arbitration. This was the first international commission since the Tavignano inquiry in 1922.

Proceedings were divided into a written and an oral stage.

The commission delivered its report in March 1962 and found no evidence of illegal fishing. Further, the commission found that the Niels Ebbesen had used excessive force, beyond that justified by international law in firing on the trawler.

== See also ==
- Cod Wars, a series of fishing disputes between the United Kingdom and Iceland in the North Atlantic Ocean.
