= Embassy of Denmark, London =

Diplomatic mission of Denmark in the United Kingdom

Embassy of Denmark in London Danmarks Ambassade, London
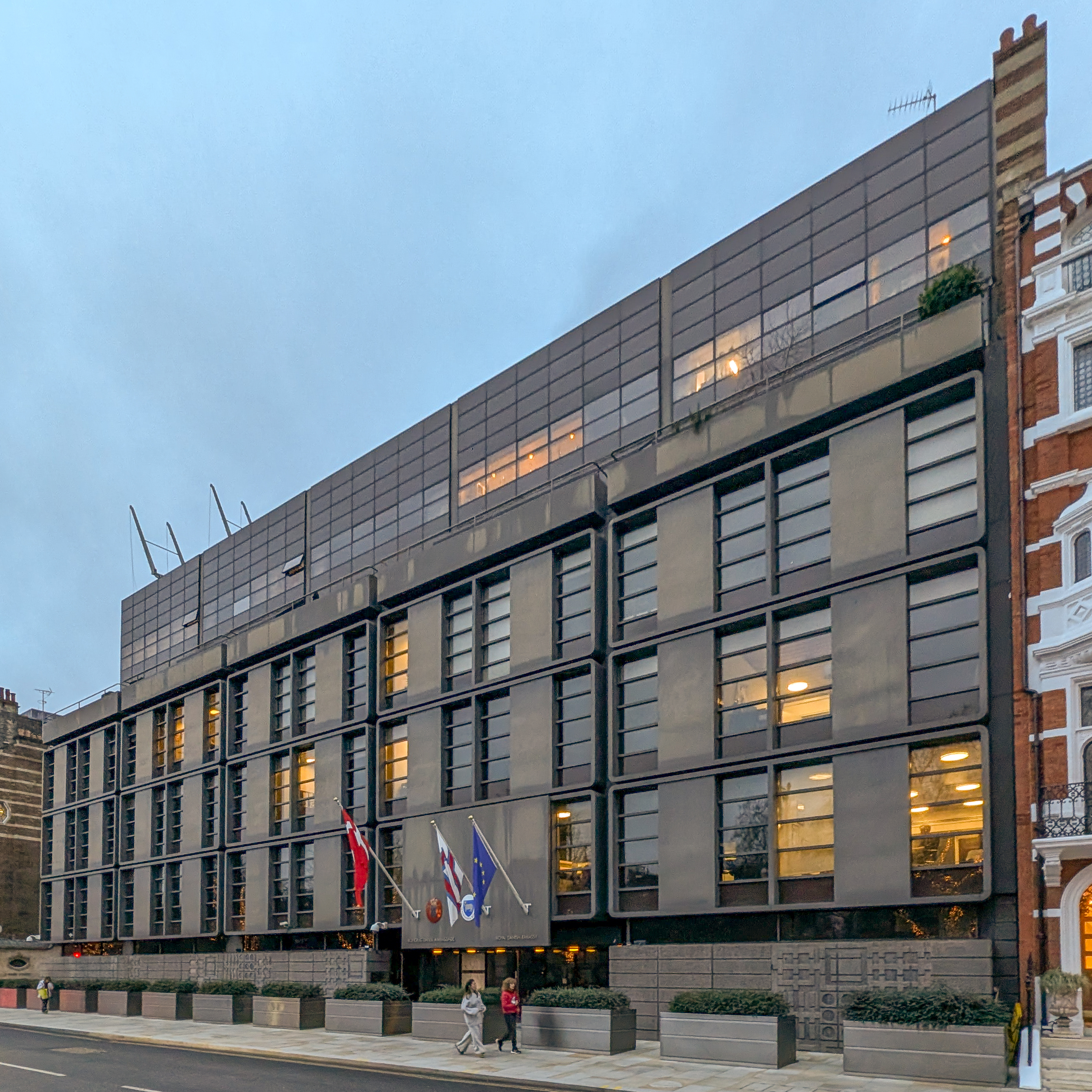
- Location: Knightsbridge, London
- Address: 55 Sloane Street, London, SW1X 9SR
- Coordinates: 51.4978°N 0.1594°W
- Ambassador: Kristina Miskowiak Beckvard

The Embassy of Denmark in London, or formally the Royal Danish Embassy, is the diplomatic mission of Denmark in the United Kingdom.

It occupies a purpose-built diplomatic complex on Sloane Street in Chelsea, designed by Danish architect Arne Jacobsen and completed in 1977, which it shares with the Embassy of Iceland. The Financial Times has described the building as a "stark architectural grid of grey modernism" and a "work of art in itself". Following Jacobsen’s death in 1971, the project was carried on by the practice operating under the name Dissing+Weitling, working in collaboration with Ove Arup Partnership in London. Construction began in April 1975, and three foundation stones were laid in June 1975 by Queen Margrethe II, Lord Cadogan, and Ambassador Erling Kristiansen. The building was formally handed over to the embassy in September 1977. The site was developed on a 99-year lease from the Cadogan Estate and replaced the embassy’s former premises in Pont Street and Cadogan Square.

The complex accommodates the embassy’s chancellery, the ambassador’s residence, and residential flats for embassy staff. The exterior originally featured light sand-coloured aluminium cladding, later repainted, and includes a geometric concrete mural by Danish artist Ole Schwalbe.

The Royal Danish Embassy also hosts the representation of the Faroes in London since 2002.

In 2006 there were protests outside the embassy following the Jyllands-Posten Muhammad cartoons controversy; a number of people were later arrested in connection with the protest.

== Design and art collection ==
In 2026, the Financial Times described the embassy as the "gold standard for art diplomacy". Its collection comprises works lent by the Danish Arts Foundation and the New Carlsberg Foundation. The ambassador's residence displays nineteenth-century and modern Danish art, including Laurits Tuxen portraits of members of the British royal family, while the chancery contains contemporary works, including a sculpture of intertwined lifebuoys by Elmgreen & Dragset.

== See also ==
- Copenhagen House Grounds, where the Danish Ambassador once resided
