= Katrin Kivi =

Estonian diplomat

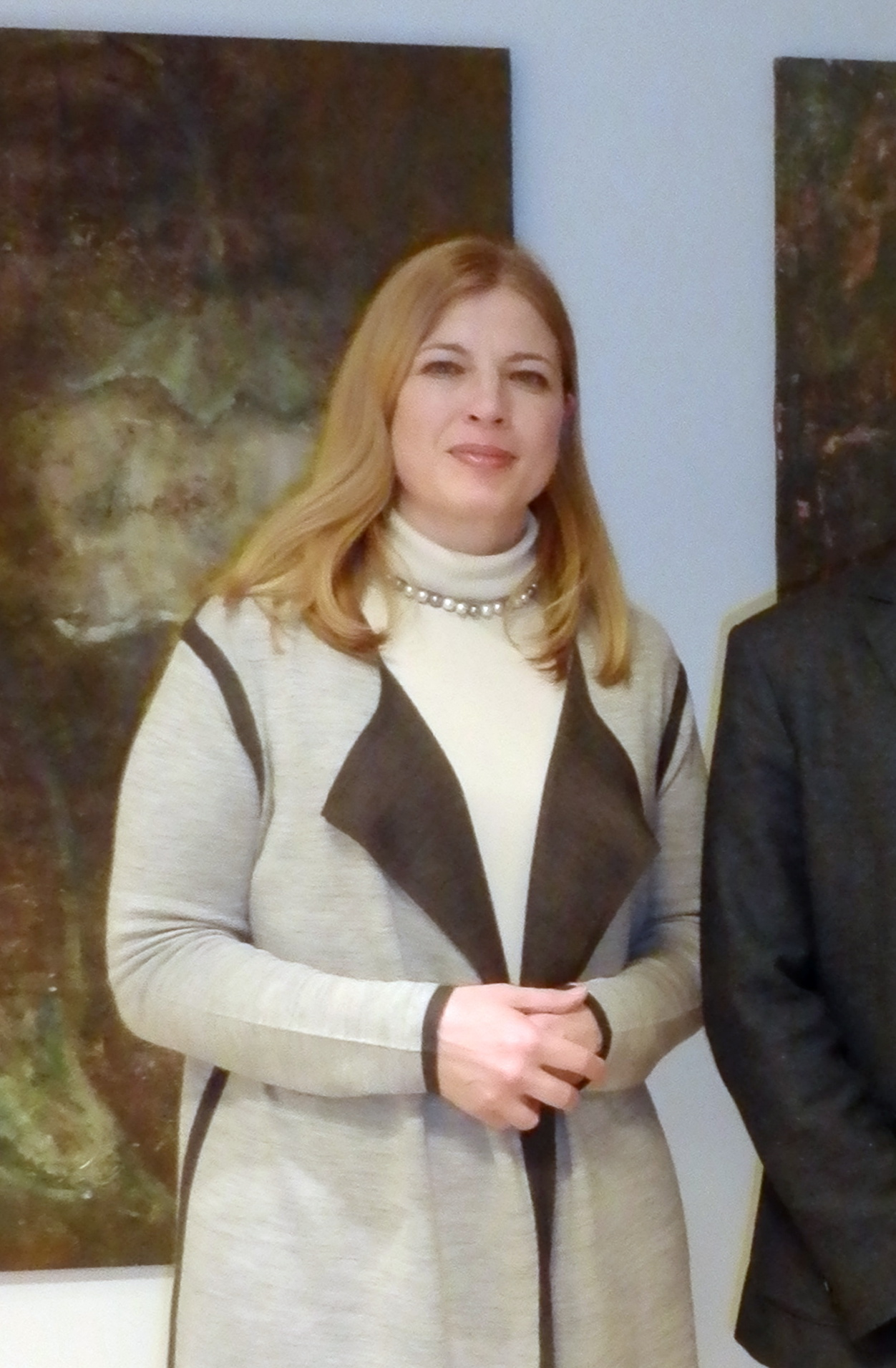

Estonian Ambassador to India
- Incumbent
- Assumed office September 2019

Permanent Representative to the Council of Europe
- In office 2015–2019

Estonian Ambassador to Denmark
- In office 2011–2015

Deputy Permanent Representative to UNESCO and Deputy Head of Mission, France
- In office 2005–2015

Personal details
- Education: Degree in German language and literature
- Alma mater: University of Tartu
- Occupation: Diplomat

Katrin Kivi (born on 18 July 1967 in Kärdla) is an Estonian diplomat, currently serving as the Ambassador of Estonia to India.

She graduated from University of Tartu in 1990 with a degree in German language and literature, and has been working for the Estonian Foreign Ministry since 1993, including as the Ambassador of Estonia to Denmark.
