= Lidegaard =

Lidegaard is a Danish surname. Notable people with the surname include:

- Bo Lidegaard (born 1958), Danish historian, diplomat, author, and newspaper editor
- Else Lidegaard (1933–2025), Danish politician
- Martin Lidegaard (born 1966), Danish politician

== See also ==
- Lindegaard
