= Liselotte Plesner =

Danish diplomat and civil servant (born 1960)

Her Excellency Liselotte Ellegaard Kjærsgaard Plesner K.
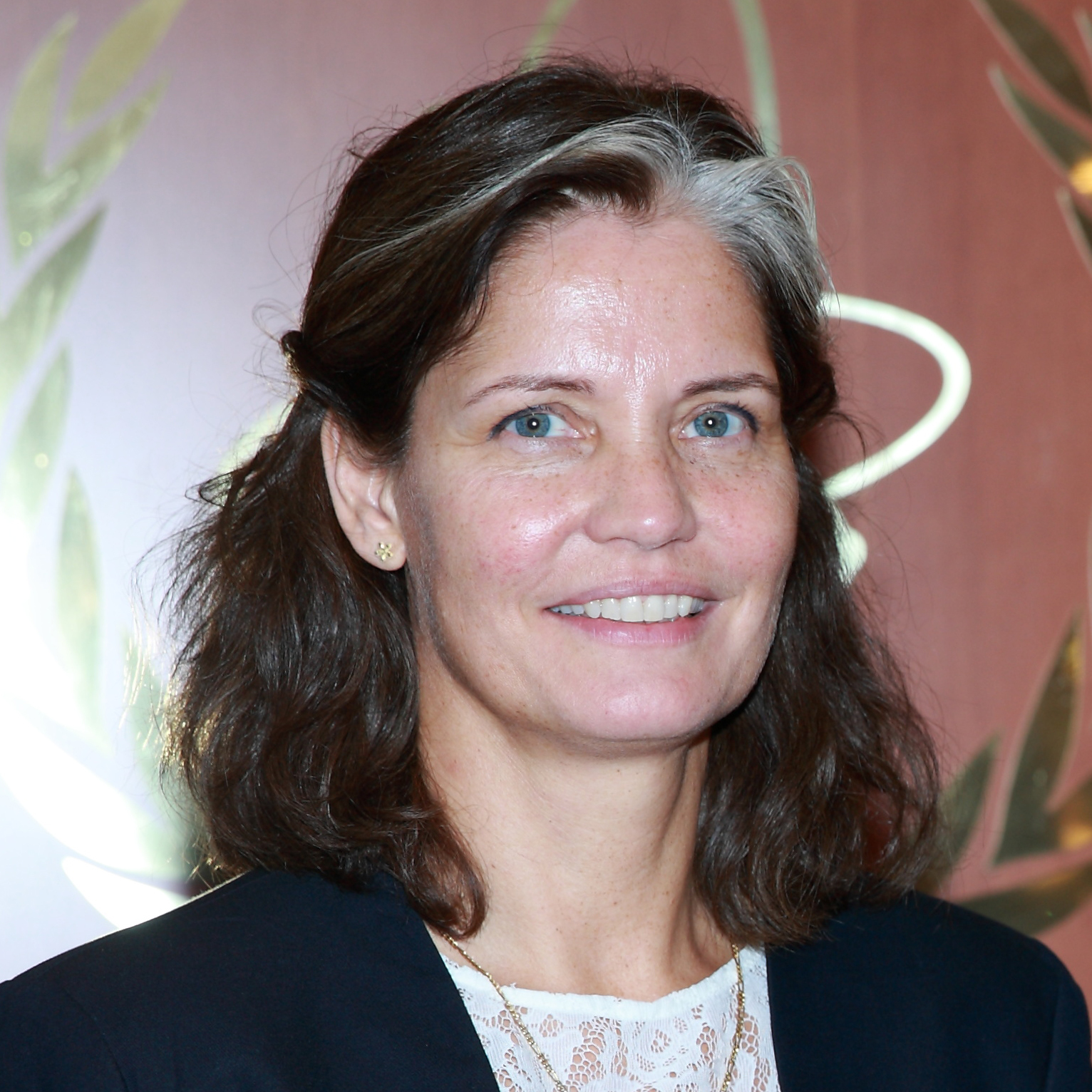
- Liselotte Plesner in 2013.

Ambassador of Denmark to Saudi Arabia concurrently to Kuwait, Bahrain, Oman and Yemen
- Incumbent
- Assumed office 1 September 2022
- Monarchs: Margrethe II; Frederik X
- Prime Minister: Mette Frederiksen
- Preceded by: Ole Emil Moesby

Permanent Representative of Denmark to NATO
- In office 1 September 2018 – 1 September 2022
- Monarch: Margrethe II
- Prime Minister: Lars Løkke Rasmussen; Mette Frederiksen
- Preceded by: Michael Zilmer-Johns
- Succeeded by: Lone Dencker Wisborg

Ambassador of Denmark to Austria concurrently to North Macedonia, Slovakia, Slovenia, Albania, the IAEA, OSCE, CTBTO and UN
- In office 2013–2018
- Monarch: Margrethe II
- Prime Minister: Helle Thorning-Schmidt; Lars Løkke Rasmussen
- Succeeded by: René Dinesen

Personal details
- Born: 6 July 1960 (age 66) Aarhus, Denmark
- Spouse: Nicolai Plesner
- Education: Aarhus University

Liselotte Ellegaard Kjærsgaard Plesner (born 6 July 1960) is a Danish diplomat and civil servant. She is the current Ambassador of Denmark to Saudi Arabia, concurrently serving as ambassador to Kuwait, Bahrain, Oman and Yemen, and having previously served as Permanent Representative of Denmark to NATO, from 2018 to 2022, the first woman to hold that position.

Plesner has held several diplomatic positions during her career, including as Ambassador of Denmark to Austria (2013–2018), concurrently serving as non-resident Ambassador to North Macedonia (2014–2017), Slovakia (2014–2017), Slovenia (2014–2018) and Albania (2018). During her time as Danish ambassador to Austria, Plesner also served as Resident Representative of Denmark to the International Atomic Energy Agency, as well as Permanent Representative of Denmark to OSCE, CTBTO and other UN organizations in Vienna. She was previously Ambassador of Denmark to Israel (2008–2013) and Political Director at the Ministry of Foreign Affairs.

== Early life and education ==
Liselotte Ellegaard Kjærsgaard Plesner was born on 6 July 1960 in Aarhus, Jutland, Denmark. She grew up in Fredericia, and attended Skjoldborgvejens School and graduated from Fredericia Gymnasium.

In 1987, she obtained a Master of Science in political science (Cand.scient.pol.) from the University of Aarhus.

== Diplomatic career ==
Plesner's career in the Danish Ministry of Foreign Affairs has been characterized by a series of increasingly significant roles and responsibilities. She began her diplomatic career in 1987, initially in the Department of International Maritime Transportations and Aviation. From 1988, she was assigned to the Department of Policy and Planning/Development Cooperation, where she was assistant to the Under-Secretary for International Development Cooperation, a post she held until 1990. Plesner later became a Desk Officer in the Department of Asia from 1990 to 1991.

In 1991, Plesner was posted to the Danish Embassy in Bonn, as Secretary, but recalled home, where she served as Private Secretary to the Minister of Foreign Affairs between 1995 and 1996. In 1996 to 1997, Plesner assumed the position of Head of the Private Office of the Foreign Minister. Subsequently, she was assigned as Deputy Chief of Mission at the Danish Embassy in Rome from 1997 to 2001, becoming Head of the Department of EU enlargement and bilateral relations with Central and Eastern European countries, Switzerland, Turkey, Cyprus, and Malta, from 2001 to 2003.

From 2003 to 2005, she was the Head of Department of bilateral relations with OECD countries and EU enlargement, before being promoted to Political Director and Ambassador of the Ministry of Foreign Affairs, a position she held from 2005 to 2008.

In her roles from 2001 to 2005, Plesner played a pivotal role in the major EU enlargement during the Danish EU presidency in 2002, which led to the 2004 enlargement of the European Union, where the EU decided to admit 10 new members from Central and Eastern Europe.

=== Israel ===
In 2008, Plesner assumed her first ambassadorial appointment, becoming Ambassador of Denmark to Israel. She presented her credentials to President Shimon Peres, on 1 September 2008.

=== Austria and the UN ===
In 2013, she was appointed Ambassador of Denmark to Austria. During her tenure as Danish ambassador to Austria, she also served concurrently as non-resident side-accredited Ambassador of Denmark to North Macedonia (2014–2017), Slovakia (2014–2017), Slovenia (2014–2018) and Albania (2018).

Her position as Danish Ambassador based in Vienna, also made her Permanent Representative of Denmark to all UN organizations in Vienna, including Permanent Representative of Denmark to OSCE and CTBTO, as well as Resident Representative of Denmark to the International Atomic Energy Agency. From 2017 to 2018, she served as vice-chairman of the Board of Governors of the IAEA.

=== NATO ===
In the 2018 ambassadorial reshuffle, Plesner was appointed Permanent Representative of Denmark to NATO, making her the first women to hold that position.

In a 2021 interview, Plesner emphasized Denmark's role in NATO and the organization's importance in guaranteeing Danish security and values. She stressed Denmark's contributions to NATO missions, including leadership of the NATO Mission Iraq, participation in Afghanistan and Kosovo missions, and support for enhanced Forward Presence in the Baltic region and NATO Air Policing.

=== Saudi Arabia and the Gulf Nations ===
In 2022, she was appointed Ambassador of Denmark to Saudi Arabia, concurrently serving as non-resident side-accredited Ambassador of Denmark to the Arab states of the Persian Gulf, including Kuwait, Bahrain, Oman and Yemen. She presented her credentials to Crown Prince and Prime Minister of Saudi Arabia, Mohammed bin Salman. Plesner is also the official representative of Denmark to the Muslim World League, based in Mecca, meeting the Secretary-General, Muhammad bin Abdul Karim Issa, in 2023.

In January 2023, she met with Prince Fahd bin Sultan bin Abdulaziz (grandson of Ibn Saud), Governor of Tabuk Province.

In June 2023, Plesner visited the base leadership at Ali Al Salem Air Base, Kuwait, where she inspected the 386th Air Expeditionary Wing, and the US/Danish partnership.

== Personal life ==
She is married to Nicolai Plesner, and together they have one son.

She is fluent in English, Italian, German, French and speaks some Hebrew.

== Honours ==
=== National ===
Denmark:

- Commander of the Order of the Dannebrog (16. april 2021)

=== International ===
- Germany: Cross of Merit, 1st Class of the Order of Merit of the Federal Republic of Germany.
- Bulgaria: Recipient of the "Golden Laurel Branch" award of the Bulgarian Foreign Ministry.
- Austria: Grand Decoration of Honour in Gold with Sash of the Decoration of Honour for Services to the Republic of Austria.
- Italy: Officer of the Order of Merit of the Italian Republic.
- Luxembourg: Commander of the Order of Merit of the Grand Duchy of Luxembourg.
