= List of ambassadors of Denmark =

Ambassadors of Denmark are people appointed to serve as the country's diplomatic representatives to foreign nations, international organizations, and as ambassadors-at-large. The head of mission to an international organization is usually a permanent representative. For some nations, a consul-general is appointed.

Ambassadors are the highest-ranking diplomats of the Kingdom of Denmark and are usually based at the embassy in the host country. They are under the jurisdiction of the Ministry of Foreign Affairs and answer directly to the Minister of Foreign Affairs. The positions have a dual role, being representatives of the Danish Monarchy and the Danish Government.

As of October 2022, Denmark has a total of 100 diplomatic missions abroad, of which 67 are embassies. Appointments change regularly for various reasons, such as reassignment or retirement, although the majority of senior positions have an initial duration of 4 years, with the possibility of reduction and extension by 1 year.

== Current Danish ambassadors ==
=== Africa ===
Host country	Host city	Mission	Ambassador / Head of Mission	Concurrent accreditation	Ref.
Algeria	Algiers	Embassy	Vanessa Vega Saenz	Countries: Tunisia	
Burkina Faso	Ouagadougou	Embassy	Kristian Kirkegaard Edinger	Countries: Benin; Chad; Niger	
Egypt	Cairo	Embassy	Anne Dorte Riggelsen		
Ethiopia	Addis Ababa	Embassy	Sune Krogerup	Countries: Djibouti; South Sudan; Sudan; International Organizations: African Union; Intergovernmental Authority on Development; United Nations Economic Commission for Africa	
Ghana	Accra	Embassy	Jakob Linulf	Countries: Guinea; Côte d’Ivoire; Liberia; Sierra Leone; Togo	
Kenya	Nairobi	Embassy	Stephan Schønemann	Countries: Eritrea; Seychelles; Somalia; International Organizations: United Nations; United Nations Environment Programme; United Nations Human Settlements Programme	
Mali	Bamako	Embassy	Rolf Holmboe	Countries: Gambia; Senegal	
Morocco	Rabat	Embassy	Berit Basse	Countries: Mauritania	
Nigeria	Abuja	Embassy	Jens-Ole Bach Hansen	Countries: Cameroon; Central African Republic; Congo-Brazzaville; Equatorial Guinea; Gabon	
Nigeria	Lagos	Consulate-General	Jette Bjerrum		
South Africa	Pretoria	Embassy	Elsebeth Søndergaard Krone	Countries: Angola; Botswana; Eswatini; Lesotho; Mozambique; Namibia; Zambia; Zimbabwe; International Organizations: Southern African Development Community	
Tanzania	Dar es Salaam	Embassy	Jesper Kammersgaard		
Uganda	Kampala	Embassy	Signe Skovbakke Winding Albjerg	Countries: Burundi; Congo-Kinshasa; Madagascar; Rwanda	

=== Americas ===
Host country	Host city	Mission	Ambassador / Head of Mission	Concurrent accreditation	Ref.
Brazil	Brasília	Embassy	Eva Pedersen	Countries: Guyana; Suriname; Uruguay	
Brazil	São Paulo	Consulate-General	Nikolaj Fredsted		
Canada	Ottawa	Embassy	Jarl Frijs-Madsen		
Canada	Toronto	Consulate-General	Karina Bech		
Chile	Santiago de Chile	Embassy	Henrik Bramsen Hahn	Countries: Ecuador; Peru	
Colombia	Bogotá	Embassy	Jens Godtfredsen	Countries: Bolivia; Costa Rica; Panama; Venezuela	
Mexico	Mexico City	Embassy	Kim Højlund Christensen	Countries: Bahamas; Barbados; Belize; Cuba; Dominica; Dominican Republic; El Salvador; Grenada; Guatemala; Haiti; Honduras; El Salvador; Jamaica; Nicaragua; Saint Kitts and Nevis; Saint Lucia; Saint Vincent and the Grenadines; Trinidad & Tobago	
United States	Washington, D.C.	Embassy	Jesper Møller Sørensen	International Organizations: Organization of American States (Note: Accredited as an observer mission.)	
United States	Chicago	Consulate-General	Jesper Køks Andersen	International Organizations: Organization of American States	
United States	Houston	Consulate-General	Morten Siem Lynge	International Organizations: Organization of American States	
United States	New York City	Consulate-General	Helle Meinertz	International Organizations: Organization of American States	
United States	Palo Alto	Consulate-General	N/A	International Organizations: Organization of American States	

=== Asia ===
Host country	Host city	Mission	Ambassador / Head of Mission	Concurrent accreditation	Ref.
Bangladesh	Dhaka	Embassy	Christian Brix Møller		
China	Beijing	Embassy	Michael Starbæk Christensen	Countries: Mongolia	
China	Guangzhou	Consulate-General	Søren Bindesbøll		
China	Shanghai	Consulate-General	Mikael Hemniti Winther		
Georgia	Tbilisi	Embassy	Anne Toft Sørensen	Countries: Armenia	
India	New Delhi	Embassy	Rasmus Abildgaard Kristensen	Countries: Bhutan; Maldives; Nepal; Sri Lanka	
India	Bengaluru	Consulate-General	Eske Bo Knudsen Rosenberg		
Indonesia	Jakarta	Embassy	Sten Frimodt Nielsen	Countries: Malaysia; Papua New Guinea; Timor-Leste; International Organizations: ASEAN (Note: Accredited as an observer mission.)	
Iraq	Baghdad	Embassy	Christian Thorning		
Iran	Tehran	Embassy	Søren Jacobsen		
Israel	Tel Aviv	Embassy	Thomas Winkler		
Japan	Tokyo	Embassy	Jarl Frijs-Madsen		
Lebanon	Beirut	Embassy	N/A	Countries: Jordan	
Malaysia	Kuala Lumpur	Embassy	Kirstine Vangkilde Berner		
Myanmar	Yangon	Embassy	John Nielsen		
Pakistan	Islamabad	Embassy	N/A		
Palestine	Ramallah	Representative office	Ketil Karlsen		
Philippines	Manila	Embassy	Franz-Michael Skjold Mellbin	Countries: Palau	
Republic of China (Taiwan)	Taipei	Trade council	Peter Sand		
Saudi Arabia	Riyadh	Embassy	Liselotte Plesner	Countries: Bahrain; Kuwait; Oman; Yemen	
Singapore	Singapore	Embassy	Jakob Brix Tange	Countries: Brunei	
South Korea	Seoul	Embassy	Svend Olling		
Thailand	Bangkok	Embassy	Danny Annan	Countries: Cambodia	
Turkey	Ankara	Embassy	Ole Toft	Countries: Azerbaijan	
Turkey	Istanbul	Consulate-General	Thierry Hoppe	Countries: Azerbaijan	
United Arab Emirates	Abu Dhabi	Embassy	Anders Bjørn Hansen	Countries: Qatar	
United Arab Emirates	Dubai	Consulate-General	Jens Martin Alsbirk	Countries: Qatar	
Vietnam	Hanoi	Embassy	Nicolai Prytz	Countries: Laos	

=== Europe ===
Host country	Host city	Mission	Ambassador / Head of Mission	Concurrent accreditation	Ref.
Austria	Vienna	Embassy	Christian Grønbech-Jensen	Countries: Albania; Kosovo; Slovakia; International Organizations: OSCE; United Nations; International Atomic Energy Agency; CTBTO Preparatory Commission; UNIDO; UNODC	
Belgium	Brussels	Embassy	Susanne Shine	Countries: Holy See; Luxembourg	
Bulgaria	Sofia	Embassy	Fleming Stender		
Croatia	Zagreb	Embassy	Ole Frijs-Madsen		
Czech Republic	Prague	Embassy	Søren Kelstrup		
Estonia	Tallinn	Embassy	Niels Boel Abrahamsen		
Finland	Helsinki	Embassy	Jakob Nymann-Lindegren		
France	Paris	Embassy	Hanne Fugl Eskjær	Countries: Monaco	
Germany	Berlin	Embassy	Thomas Østrup Møller	Countries: Liechtenstein; Switzerland	
Germany	Flensburg	Consulate-General	Kim Andersen	Countries: Liechtenstein; Switzerland	
Germany	Hamburg	Consulate-General	Jakob Andersen	Countries: Liechtenstein; Switzerland	
Germany	Munich	Consulate-General	Klaus Werner	Countries: Liechtenstein; Switzerland	
Greece	Athens	Embassy	Per Fabricius Andersen	Countries: Cyprus	
Hungary	Budapest	Embassy	Christian Thorning		
Iceland	Reykjavík	Embassy	Erik Vilstrup Lorenzen		
Ireland	Dublin	Embassy	Lars Thuesen		
Italy	Rome	Embassy	Anders Carsten Damsgaard	Countries: Malta; San Marino; International Organizations: Food and Agriculture Organization; International Fund for Agricultural Development; World Food Programme	
Latvia	Riga	Embassy	Morten Jespersen		
Lithuania	Vilnius	Embassy	Grete Sillasen		
Netherlands	The Hague	Embassy	Ulf Melgaard	International Organizations: International Criminal Court; International Court of Justice; OCPW	
Norway	Oslo	Embassy	Louise Bang Jespersen		
Poland	Warsaw	Embassy	Jakob Henningsen		
Portugal	Lisbon	Embassy	Maria Nilaus Tarp	Countries: Cape Verde; Guinea-Bissau; São Tomé and Principe	
Romania	Bucharest	Embassy	Uffe Balslev	Countries: Moldova	
Russia	Moscow	Embassy	Jesper Vahr	Countries: Belarus; Kazakhstan; Kyrgyzstan; Tajikistan; Turkmenistan; Uzbekistan	
Serbia	Belgrade	Embassy	Pernille Kardel	Countries: Bosnia and Herzegovina; Montenegro; North Macedonia	
Spain	Madrid	Embassy	Michael Braad	Countries: Andorra	
Sweden	Stockholm	Embassy	Kristina Miskowiak Beckvard		
Ukraine	Kyiv	Embassy	Ole Egberg Mikkelsen		
United Kingdom	London	Embassy	René Dinesen		

=== Oceania ===
Host country	Host city	Mission	Ambassador / Head of Mission	Concurrent accreditation	Ref.
Australia	Canberra	Embassy	Ingrid Dahl-Madsen	Countries: Fiji; New Zealand	
Australia	Sydney	Consulate-General	Ulrik Dahl		

== Ambassadors to multilateral organizations ==
Organization	Host city	Host country	Mission	Head of Mission	Concurrent accreditation	Ref.
Council of Europe	Strasbourg	France	Permanent Representation	Jens Kisling		
European Union	Brussels	Belgium	Permanent Representation	Carsten Grønbech-Jensen		
NATO	Brussels	Belgium	Permanent Representation	Lone Dencker Wisborg		
OECD	Paris	France	Permanent Representation	Martin Bille Hermann		
United Nations	New York City	United States	Permanent Mission	Christina Markus Lassen		
United Nations	Geneva	Switzerland	Permanent Mission	Ib Petersen	International Organizations: International Labour Organization; World Health Organization; World Trade Organization	
UNESCO	Paris	France	Permanent Delegation	Martin Bille Hermann		

== See also ==
- List of diplomatic missions of Denmark
- Foreign relations of Denmark
- List of diplomatic missions of the Nordic countries

== Sources ==
- Marcussen, Martin (2016). Diplomati: Et portræt af den moderne udenrigstjeneste (in Danish) (1st ed.). Copenhagen: Hans Reitzels Forlag. ISBN 978-87-412-5666-5. ISSN 2245-5116.
- Ronit, Karsten; Marcussen, Martin (2014). Dansk diplomati – klassiske træk og nye tendenser (in Danish) (1st ed.). Copenhagen: Hans Reitzels Forlag. ISBN 978-87-412-5579-8.
- Fischer, Paul; Svenningsen, Nils (1970). Den Danske Udenrigstjeneste 1770-1970 (in Danish). Copenhagen: J. H. Schhultz Forlag. ISBN 978-87-569-0027-0.
