= Jean-Charles Ellermann-Kingombe =

Danish diplomat and civil servant

His Excellency Jean-Charles Ellermann-Kingombe R.
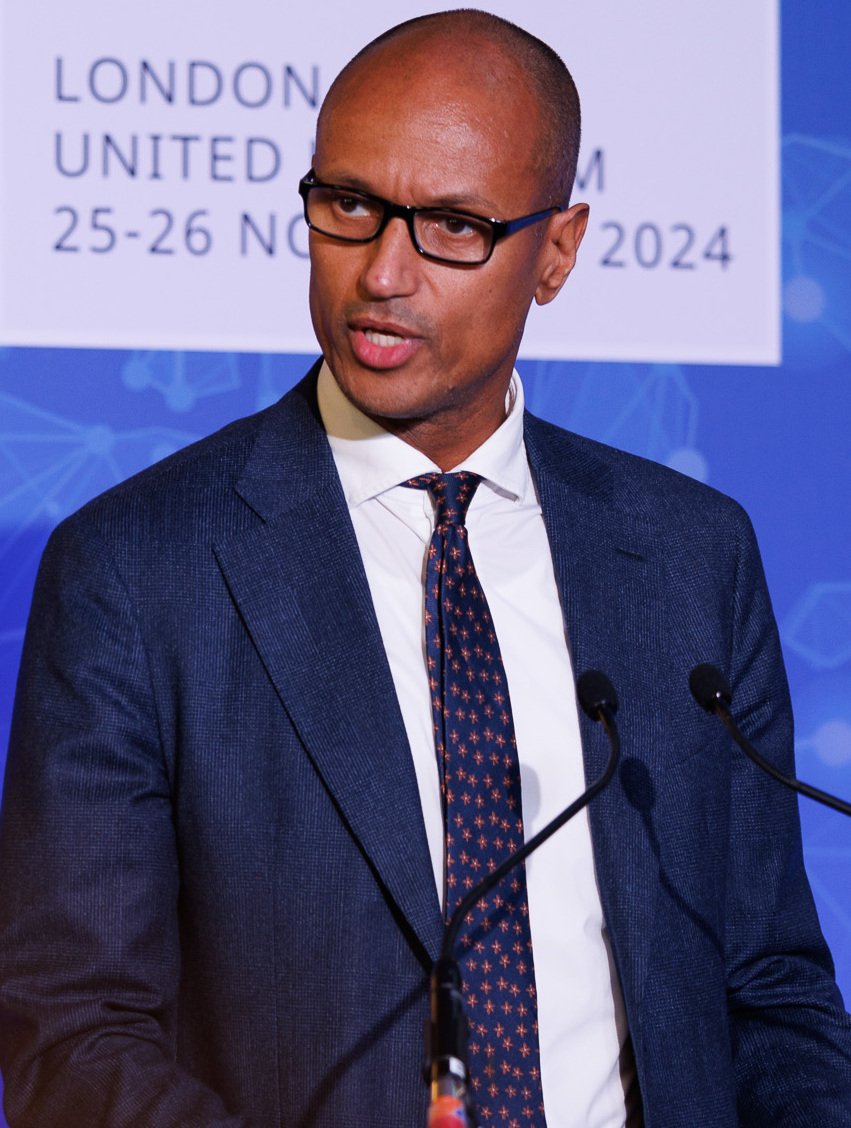
- Ellermann-Kingombe in 2024.

NATO Assistant Secretary General for Cyber Defence and Digital Transformation
- Incumbent
- Assumed office 15 August 2024
- Secretary General: Jens Stoltenberg; Mark Rutte
- Preceded by: David van Weel

Permanent Under-Secretary of State for Foreign Affairs
- In office 1 January 2019 – 15 August 2024
- Monarchs: Margrethe II; Frederik X
- Prime Minister: Lars Løkke Rasmussen; Mette Frederiksen
- Preceded by: Michael Starbæk Christensen
- Succeeded by: Anders Tang Friborg

Ambassador of Denmark to Afghanistan
- In office 2016–2017
- Monarch: Margrethe II
- Prime Minister: Lars Løkke Rasmussen
- Preceded by: Uffe Wolffhechel
- Succeeded by: Jakob Brix Tange

Personal details
- Born: Jean-Charles Kingombe; 28 December 1970 (age 55) Copenhagen
- Spouse: Henriette Ellermann-Kingombe
- Children: 2
- Education: Copenhagen Business School; HEC Paris

Jean-Charles Ellermann-Kingombe (born 28 December 1970) is a Danish diplomat and civil servant. He is the current NATO Assistant Secretary General for Cyber Defence and Digital Transformation as well as NATO Special Coordinator for Hybrid Threats, having previously served as Permanent Under Secretary of State for Foreign Affairs at the Danish Prime Minister's Office between 2019 and 2024, under Prime Minister Mette Frederiksen, and briefly Lars Løkke Rasmussen.

Ellermann-Kingombe is a career diplomat with a long service at the Danish Ministry of Foreign Affairs. He has served as Ambassador of Denmark to Afghanistan (2016–2017), and before that as Head of the Executive Secretariat, the chief of staff to the Minister of Foreign Affairs (2013–2016). He was the press advisor to the Minister for Foreign Affairs and the Minister of European Affairs (2010–2013), under Lene Espersen and later Villy Søvndal, and has also served as deputy head of various departments in the Ministry of Foreign Affairs. From 2001 to 2007, he was stationed in Brussels, serving firstly as press secretary during the Danish EU presidency in 2002, and afterwards as spokesperson and cabinet member for the Danish EU Commissioners Poul Nielson (Development and Humanitarian Aid) and subsequently Mariann Fischer Boel (Agriculture).

In 2024, he was appointed NATO Assistant Secretary General, overseeing the Alliance’s policies on cyber defence and threats, digital transformation, and hybrid warfare. During his tenure under Secretary General Mark Rutte, Ellermann-Kingombe has advocated for an intensification of Allied efforts to safeguard critical infrastructure and emerging technologies, calling for a "wartime mindset" in response to hybrid and cyber threats.

== Early life and education ==
Jean-Charles Ellermann-Kingombe was born on 28 December 1970 in Copenhagen, Denmark. He grew up in Denmark with a Danish mother, Anette Larsen, and his father, Jean Onapota Kingombe, from the former Zaire - now the Democratic Republic of Congo. He attended French school as a child and is sometimes described as a "Francophone".

In 1996, Ellermann-Kingombe obtained a Master of Science in International Business from Copenhagen Business School. In 1995, during his master's programme, he studied International Marketing and Finance at HEC Paris, France.

== Career ==
=== Early career ===
European Commission portrait of Ellermann-Kingombe as spokesman for Poul Nielson, in 2003.

After his studies in Paris, Ellermann-Kingombe was subsequently given an internship in Brussels, under the cabinet of the then EU Commissioner for the Environment, Ritt Bjerregaard. Here, the head of cabinet, Laurs Nørlund, advised Ellermann-Kingombe to choose the Danish Foreign Service, as he had otherwise envisioned a career in the private sector.

Ellermann-Kingombe started his diplomatic career as head of section (Danish: fuldmægtig) in the Ministry of Foreign Affairs in 1996. He was soon posted to the Danish Embassy in Mozambique, where he served as Embassy Secretary in charge of environmental support aid.

In 2001, he was recalled from Maputo and stationed in Brussels in preparation for the Danish EU presidency in 2002. Here Ellermann-Kingombe was assigned as press secretary and spokesperson responsible for COREPER I related issues. From 2003, he served as spokesperson in the Cabinet of Poul Nielson, European Commissioner for International Cooperation and Development, in charge of relations with the Danish media and liaising with the European Parliament. Following the 2004 European elections, Nielsen was replaced as the Danish Commissioner, and Mariann Fischer Boel was selected. Ellermann-Kingombe continued to serve as a member of her cabinet, and she became EU Commissioner for Agriculture.

Ellermann-Kingombe was recalled to Copenhagen in 2007, serving as Deputy Head of the European Affairs at the Ministry of Foreign Affairs, before becoming deputy director for Strategy and Policy Planning in 2010. However, he only held this position briefly, as in November of that year he was appointed press advisor to the Minister for Foreign Affairs and the Minister of European Affairs (2010–2013), serving under Lene Espersen and later Villy Søvndal. Between 2013 and 2016, he served as Head of the Executive Secretariat, a position corresponding to a chief of staff function to the Minister of Foreign Affairs, under ministers Holger K. Nielsen, Martin Lidegaard and Kristian Jensen.

=== Afghanistan ===
In 2016, Ellermann-Kingombe assumed his first ambassadorial appointment, becoming Ambassador of Denmark to Afghanistan. During his time as ambassador, Danish military forces were present in Afghanistan as part of the NATO Resolute Support Mission, and Ellermann-Kingombe visited and inspected the forces on several occasions.

He was recalled from Kabul in 2017, and replaced by Jakob Brix Tange. After his tenure in Afghanistan, Ellermann-Kingombe had a brief professional interlude and spent a few years as a senior project manager at the consultancy Struensee & co.

=== Prime Minister's Office ===
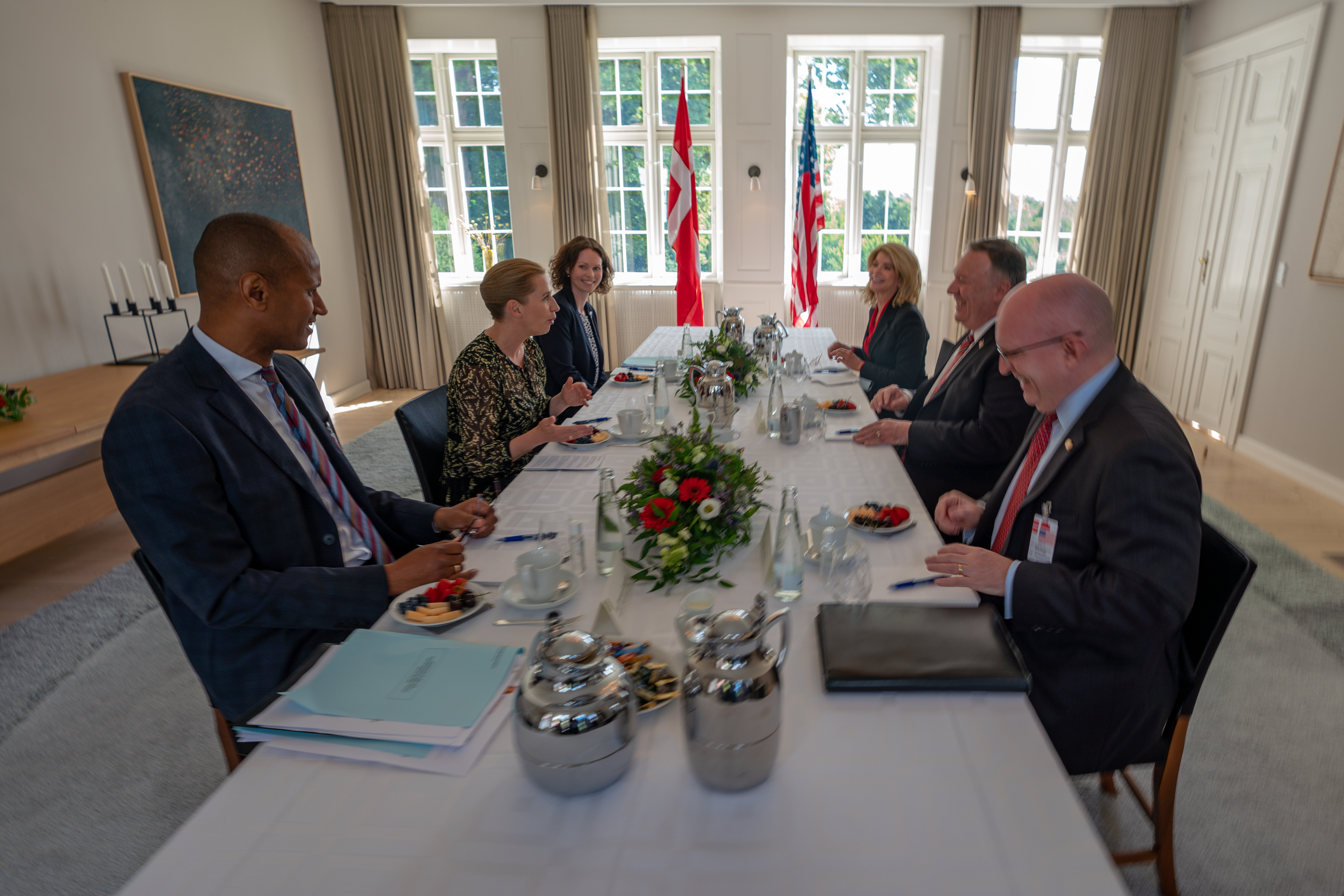
Ellermann-Kingombe (seated left) in 2022, at a meeting between Prime Minister Mette Frederiksen and US Secretary of State, Mike Pompeo.

In January 2019, he became the Permanent Under Secretary of State for Foreign Affairs at the Prime Minister's Office. He served briefly under Prime Minister Lars Løkke Rasmussen, before the 2019 Danish general election supplanted Rasmussen's majority, after which he served under Prime Minister Mette Frederiksen. In this position, Ellermann-Kingombe headed the Foreign Policy Division of the department, in charge of foreign affairs, security policy, national security, international economic concerns such as those within the European Union, global security affairs, Nordic collaboration, and issues concerning security and defence, including NATO.

As the Prime Minister's chief diplomatic and security advisor, Ellermann-Kingombe served a role similar to that of the National Security Advisor in the United States. He also functioned as the political Sherpa of Prime Minister Mette Frederiksen, during international summits and events.

In his role as Permanent Under Secretary of State for Foreign Affairs, Ellermann-Kingombe was described as Frederiksen's ‘top diplomat’ and ‘closest advisor’. He maintained regular dialogue with National Security Advisor Jake Sullivan and with European security policy actors. In 2023, Copenhagen hosted an unofficial summit of high-level officials on Ukraine and peace efforts. Top diplomats from the US, Ukraine and a number of non-Western powers attended, and as a representative of the host nation, Ellermann-Kingombe oversaw much of the planning. He was present at the closed meeting held at the White House during Prime Minister Mette Frederiksen's meeting with President Joe Biden in the spring of 2023.

In 2022, he was mentioned as one of the top candidates to replace Lars Lose, as Permanent Secretary at the Ministry of Foreign Affairs.

=== NATO Assistant Secretary General ===
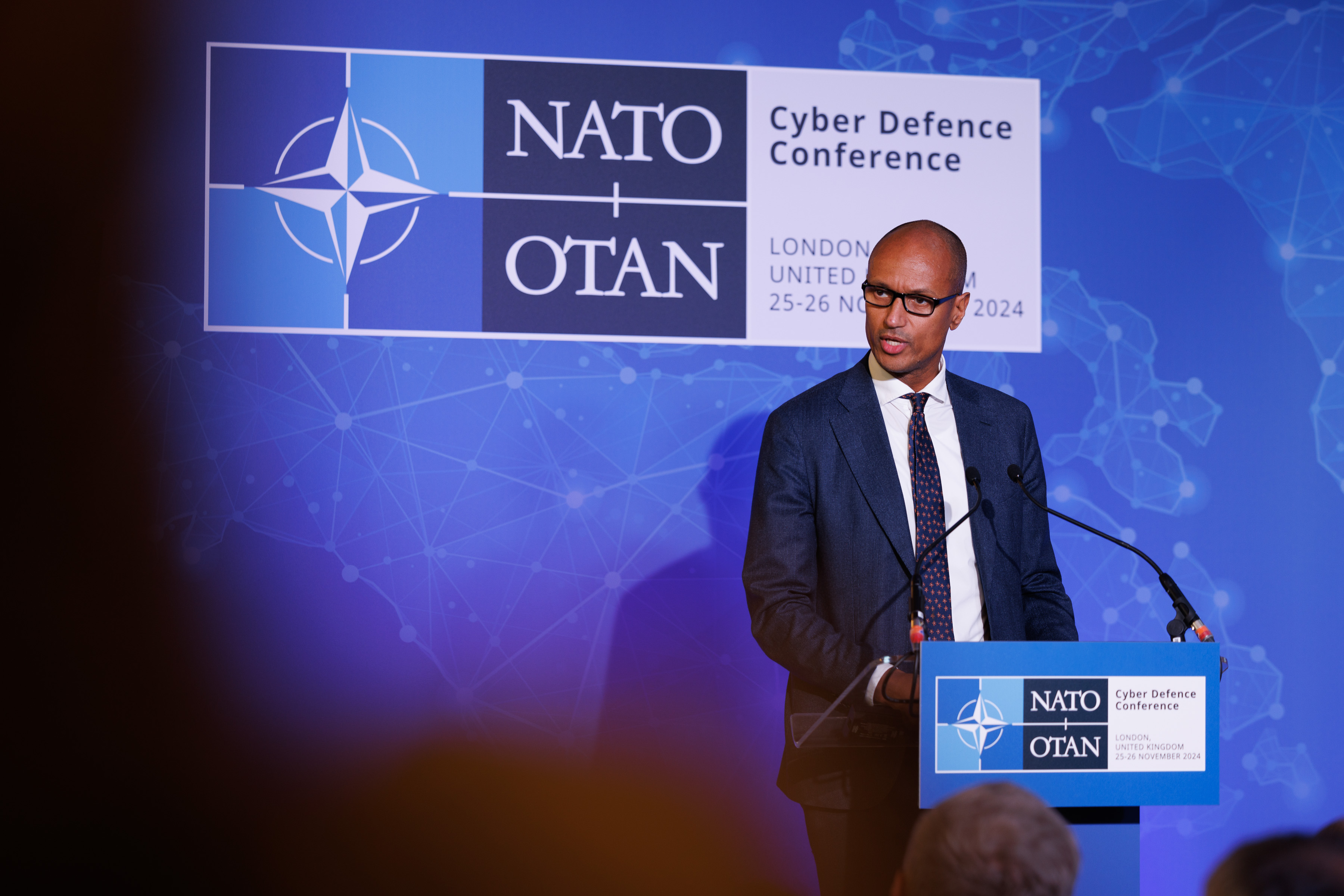
Ellermann-Kingombe in 2024, speaking at the NATO Cyber Defence Conference held at Lancaster House, London.

In the 2024 ambassadorial reshuffle, Ellermann-Kingombe was originally appointed the Ambassador of Denmark to France, replacing Michael Starbæk Christensen. He was to assume this position on 15 August 2024, and the appointment of Ellermann-Kingombe was seen as a move responding to the growing strategic importance of Paris in European politics post-Brexit, where his diplomatic background and close ties to President Macron's political circle were perceived by observers as highlighting Denmark's enhanced focus on Franco-Danish relations.

However, in the start of August 2024, the Ministry of Foreign Affairs stated that Ellermann-Kingombe has instead been appointed Assistant Secretary General for Innovation, Hybrid and Cyber (IHC) of NATO, replacing David van Weel. In this position, Ellermann-Kingombe advises on technological advancements, cyber defense, and hybrid threats, focusing on NATO's innovative superiority. His division addresses security challenges like energy security, AI, quantum computing, critical undersea infrastructure, biotechnology, and manages the Science for Peace and Security Programme. His position's remit was changed in 2025 to also encompass digital transformation.

In a 2025 interview with the Danish newspaper Børsen, Ellermann-Kingombe described the global security situation as "the worst in my lifetime," highlighting Russia's preparation for "a long-term confrontation" supported by a "wartime economy" dedicating 7% of GDP to defense. He expressed concern over China's technological advancements, noting it is "on par with NATO or even slightly ahead" in most critical areas. On hybrid threats, Ellermann-Kingombe emphasized that cyberattacks and sabotage are now "an integrated part of [Russia’s] military doctrine," calling for "massive investment" in innovation and a steadfast commitment to NATO's core values: "If we abandon our Western values, we abandon ourselves."

Ahead of the 2025 The Hague NATO summit, Ellermann-Kingombe unveiled a "technology acceleration plan" that raises allied defence spending targets to 3.5% of GDP, with an extra 1.5% for cyber-resilience. The initiatives are backed by NATO’s €1 billion Innovation Fund and the 180-site DIANA accelerator network. He also warned that the Alliance risked "falling behind" China in 37 of 42 critical technologies, and pointed to Russia’s use of low-cost drones and under-sea-cable sabotage as evidence of the urgency for rapid innovation.

== Personal life ==
He is married to Henriette Ellermann-Kingombe, lady-in-waiting and private secretary to Queen Mary of Denmark.

== Honours ==
=== National ===
- Denmark:
  - Knight of the Order of the Dannebrog.
  - Knight 1st Class of the Order of the Dannebrog (2022).
