= Michael Zilmer-Johns =

Danish diplomat

Michael Zilmer-Johns R.
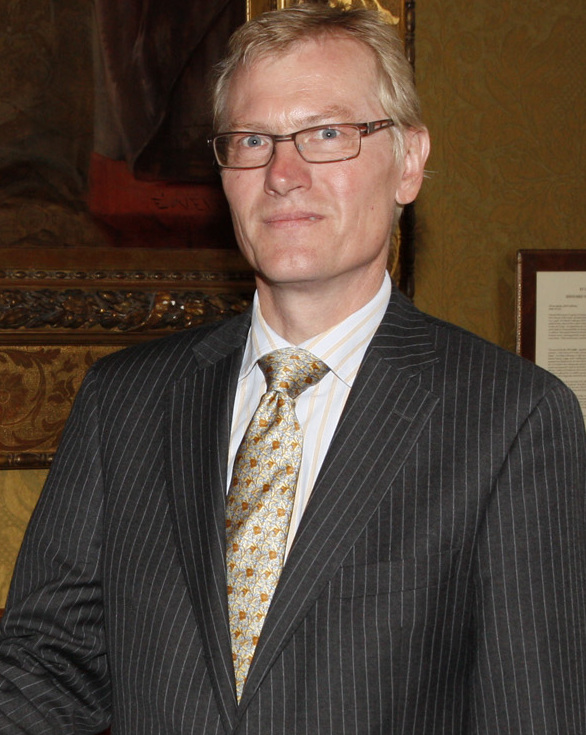
- Michael Zilmer-Johns in 2010.

Chief of Protocol of the Kingdom of Denmark
- In office 1 September 2018 – 1 February 2023
- Monarch: Margrethe II
- Prime Minister: Lars Løkke Rasmussen; Mette Frederiksen
- Succeeded by: Nathalia Feinberg

Permanent Representative of Denmark to NATO
- In office 1 September 2014 – 1 September 2018
- Monarch: Margrethe II
- Prime Minister: Helle Thorning-Schmidt; Lars Løkke Rasmussen
- Preceded by: Carsten Søndergaard
- Succeeded by: Liselotte Plesner

State Secretary for Foreign and European Affairs at the Ministry of Foreign Affairs
- In office October 2005 – August 2013
- Monarch: Margrethe II
- Prime Minister: Anders Fogh Rasmussen; Lars Løkke Rasmussen; Helle Thorning-Schmidt
- Preceded by: Friis Arne Petersen
- Succeeded by: John Nielsen

Permanent Under-Secretary of State for Foreign Affairs
- In office 2003–2005
- Monarch: Margrethe II
- Prime Minister: Anders Fogh Rasmussen
- Preceded by: Per Poulsen-Hansen
- Succeeded by: Bo Lidegaard

Personal details
- Born: Michael Peter Zilmer; 19 June 1957 (age 69) Slagelse, Denmark
- Spouse(s): Kirsten Frølich Jensen (m. 1985; div. 1993) Lisbet Zilmer-Johns (m. 1996)
- Children: 4
- Education: University of Copenhagen

Michael Peter Zilmer-Johns (born 19 June 1957) is a Danish retired senior diplomat and civil servant. He is currently senior fellow at the Royal Danish Defence College and the think tank Axcelfuture, having previously served as Permanent Representative of Denmark to NATO (2014–2018) as well as Chief of Protocol (2018–2023) and State Secretary for Foreign and European Affairs (2005–2013) at the Ministry of Foreign Affairs.

Zilmer-Johns' extensive career in the Danish Foreign Service spans over four decades, and he has held several key positions, including being appointed Political Director at the Ministry of Foreign Affairs, just days before the 9/11 attacks. In 2003, he became the Permanent Under-Secretary of State for Foreign and Security Policy under Prime Minister Anders Fogh Rasmussen, dealing with significant challenges such as the Iraq war. Returning to the Ministry of Foreign Affairs in 2005 as State Secretary, he contributed to the negotiation of the Lisbon Treaty, before being seconded to the European External Action Service as advisor on security and defence.

In 2020, the Danish government appointed Zilmer-Johns as Chairman of the Security Policy Analysis Group, whose purpose it was to prepare a White paper on the foreign and security policy situation towards 2035. In the autumn of 2022, the group published their analysis 'Danish Security and Defence towards 2035' (dubbed the "Zilmer-report"), which will form the foundation for the upcoming Defence Agreement in the Danish Parliament, where $21 billion has been provisionally allocated. He is a staunch advocate of the expansion of Danish civil defence, has proposed the establishment of a strong and centralized Ministry of Civil Defence, and has emphasized Denmark's insufficient preparedness.

== Early life and education ==
Michael Peter Zilmer was born 19 June 1957 in Slagelse, Denmark. He is the son of Colonel in the Royal Danish Army and President of the Royal Danish Defence College, John Egon Zilmer, and of his wife Kirsten Wilstrup. He grew up on Bornholm, his father being stationed at Almegård Barracks.

He studied economics at Copenhagen University and Christian Albrecht University in Kiel. After graduation in 1982 he began his career at the Danish Ministry of Foreign Affairs working on GATT, EEC accession negotiations with Spain and Portugal as well as development co-operation with Latin America, Angola and Mozambique.

== Diplomatic career ==
From 1985 to 1988 he served as Secretary of Embassy at the Danish EEC representation in Brussels. Back in Copenhagen he became Secretary of the Corporate Board and Assistant Private Secretary to Minister for Foreign Affairs Uffe Ellemann-Jensen. Between 1992 and 1995 he was Head of the EU and Economic Section at the Danish Embassy in Bonn. After one year as Deputy in the Department for North Africa, the Middle East and Latin America at the Danish Ministry of Foreign Affairs, he became head of the Policy and Planning Department of the Danish International Development Agency in 1996.

On 1 September 2001, just 10 days before the 9/11 terror attacks, he was appointed Political Director at the Ministry of Foreign Affairs, and worked intensively during the next two years handling the ensuing crisis. On behalf of the European Union, Zilmer-Johns made "major" contributions to the formation of the Road map for peace (Quartet's Road Map), a plan to resolve the Israeli–Palestinian conflict proposed by the Quartet on the Middle East, unveiled in Washington in December 2002. During the Danish EU presidency in 2002, Zilmer-Johns chaired the EU Political Committee, and was responsible for relations with the candidate countries and has since been described as a "key advisor" and facilitator of the 2004 enlargement of the European Union, where the EU decided to admit 10 new members from Central and Eastern Europe.

In 2003, he became foreign and security advisor, formally Permanent Under-Secretary of State (Danish: Departementsråd), to Prime Minister Anders Fogh Rasmussen with the Iraq War and the EU Constitutional Treaty among key challenges. In 2005 he returned to the Ministry of Foreign Affairs as State Secretary for Foreign and European Affairs. His responsibilities covered the EU, OSCE, Denmark’s strategic partnerships with the US, Russia and China, other bilateral relations as well as security, including NATO and Danish participation in military operations.

In 2013 he was seconded to the European External Action Service as advisor on security and defence. He served as Danish ambassador to NATO 2014-18 and Chief of Protocol in the Danish MFA 2018-21.In March 2020 the Danish Government tasked him to chair a security policy group with a mandate to prepare a “Whitepaper” on Denmark’s international and security situation in order to prepare the next multiannual Danish Defence spending Agreement. The paper - Danish Defence and Security towards 2035 was published in October 2022.

=== Retirement ===
Zilmer-Johns retired from the Danish Foreign Service in 2023, culminating a 44-year diplomatic career. He is presently affiliated with the Royal Danish Defence College and the think tank Axcelfuture, as senior fellow.

== Personal life ==
Zilmer-Johns married firstly in 1985 to Kirsten Frølich Jensen. Together they have two sons. They were divorced in 1993. He remarried in 1996 to the current State Secretary for Foreign Affairs at the Ministry of Foreign Affairs, Lisbet Zilmer-Johns. They have two daughters.
