= Henriette Ellermann-Kingombe =

Danish civil servant, courtier (born 1970)

Private Secretary to Her Majesty Queen Mary of Denmark
- Incumbent
- Assumed office 1 September 2021
- Monarchs: Margrethe II; Frederik X
- Preceded by: Christine Pii Hansen

Personal details
- Born: Henriette Ellermann; 21 March 1970 (age 56) Randers
- Spouse: Jean-Charles Ellermann-Kingombe
- Children: 2
- Education: University of Copenhagen

Henriette Ellermann-Kingombe (born 21 March 1970) is a Danish civil servant and courtier, who is the current Private Secretary and lady-in-waiting to Queen Mary of Denmark, since 2021.

A career diplomat, she has previously served in the Danish Ministry of Foreign Affairs and at the Prime Minister’s Office, where she held senior roles in departments dealing with multilateral cooperation, climate policy, green growth, and international development. Her responsibilities included policy coordination with international organizations such as the United Nations and development banks, as well as administrative support to government ministers.

In 2021, she was appointed to the Royal Household of Denmark as private secretary and lady-in-waiting to the Crown Princess. Upon the accession of King Frederik X in 2024, she became a member of the Court's leadership (Danish: Kongehusets ledelsesgruppe), where she oversees official engagements, correspondence, and protocol matters on behalf of Queen Mary.

== Early life and education ==
Henriette Ellermann-Kingombe was born on 21 March 1970 in Randers.

She earned a Master’s degree in political science (cand.scient.pol.) from the University of Copenhagen, completing her studies in 1998. In 2009, she completed an executive leadership program at the Danish School of Public Administration (Danish: Danmarks Forvaltningshøjskole), a course that included training in leadership, coaching, and conflict management.

Ellermann-Kingombe has been involved in academia alongside her civil service career. In the late 1990s, she served as an instructor at the University of Copenhagen’s Department of Political Science, teaching introductory courses to first-year political science students. She later returned to the department as an external lecturer in 2013, teaching a graduate-level course on the European Union and diplomacy.

In addition, from 2013 to 2022 she was appointed as an external examiner (Danish: censor) in the fields of international politics and public administration at several Danish universities – including the University of Copenhagen, Aarhus University, the University of Southern Denmark (SDU), and Copenhagen Business School (CBS).

== Career ==
=== Civil service career ===
Ellermann-Kingombe joined the Danish Ministry of Foreign Affairs (MFA) in 2001, embarking on what would become a nearly 20-year career in the civil service. Her early roles included serving as an embassy secretary to the Permanent Representation of Denmark to the European Union, and as chief consultant in the MFA’s Asia Department from 2010 to 2011, where she focused on Denmark’s relations with Asian countries. In October 2011, she became a ministerial secretary in the MFA, coordinating and managing the activities of the government’s Minister for European Affairs and later the Minister for Trade and European Affairs. She held that position until 2014.

In March 2014, Ellermann-Kingombe was appointed deputy head of the Office for Green Growth in the MFA, a role she held until 2016. In this position, she worked on initiatives related to sustainable development and green economic growth in Denmark’s foreign policy. From 2016 to 2021, she served as deputy head of the MFA’s Office for Multilateral Cooperation, Climate, and Gender Equality, where she was involved in Denmark’s engagement with international organizations (including the United Nations) and global policy issues such as climate change and gender equality. By 2021, she had risen to become the head of department for Multilateral Cooperation and Policy at the Foreign Ministry, overseeing multilateral policy coordination. In this capacity, Ellermann-Kingombe had special responsibility for Denmark’s cooperation with the UN and other international organizations.

During her time in government service, Ellermann-Kingombe also gained experience outside the Foreign Ministry. From 2007 to 2010, she was seconded as a special consultant to the Prime Minister’s Office, working in the Climate Secretariat during the lead-up to the United Nations Climate Change Conference 2009 (COP15) in Copenhagen. In that role, she served as an advisor on the Danish prime minister’s climate team, contributing to the coordination of Denmark’s climate policy and the hosting of the COP15 summit.

=== Royal Household ===
Ellermann-Kingombe transitioned to a royal court role in 2021. On 1 September 2021, she was appointed Private Secretary and lady-in-waiting to Crown Princess Mary of Denmark, succeeding Christine Pii Hansen in that position. She became the principal private secretary to the Crown Princess, responsible for managing the Crown Princess’s official agenda and providing counsel on matters of protocol and public engagements. Her duties include coordinating royal events and travel, handling official correspondence, and advising the Crown Princess on organizational and policy-related matters connected to patronages and initiatives. As a lady-in-waiting, she also accompanies the Crown Princess (now Queen) at ceremonies and engagements.

In January 2024, Crown Princess Mary became Queen consort upon the accession of King Frederik X. Ellermann-Kingombe continued in her role, now serving as private secretary to Queen Mary.

== Personal life ==
Henriette Ellermann-Kingombe is married to Jean-Charles Ellermann-Kingombe, a Danish diplomat and government official. Jean-Charles has held several prominent positions, including serving as the Permanent Under-Secretary of State for Foreign Affairs at the Danish Prime Minister’s Office and later as a senior official at NATO. The couple reside in Hellerup, an area near Copenhagen, and have two children.

== Honours and decorations ==
Ellermann-Kingombe has received the following honours and decorations:

=== National ===
Denmark:

- Commander 1st Class of the Order of the Dannebrog.
- Commander of the Order of the Dannebrog (2022).
- Queen Margrethe II's Golden Jubilee Medal (2022).

=== Foreign ===
- Estonia: Order of the Cross of Terra Mariana, 3rd Class (2026).
- Latvia: Commander of the Cross of Recognition.
- Lithuania: Officer of the Order for Merits to Lithuania (2026).
- France: Officer of the Ordre national du Mérite.
- Finland: Commander of the Order of the White Rose of Finland.
- Egypt: Second Class of the Order of the Republic.
- Iceland: Grand Knight's Cross of the Order of the Falcon.
- Norway: Commander of the Royal Norwegian Order of Merit.
- Sweden: Commander of the Order of the Polar Star.
- Spain: Officer of the Royal Order of Civil Merit.
