= Michael Starbæk Christensen =

Danish diplomat and civil servant

His Excellency Michael Starbæk Christensen R.
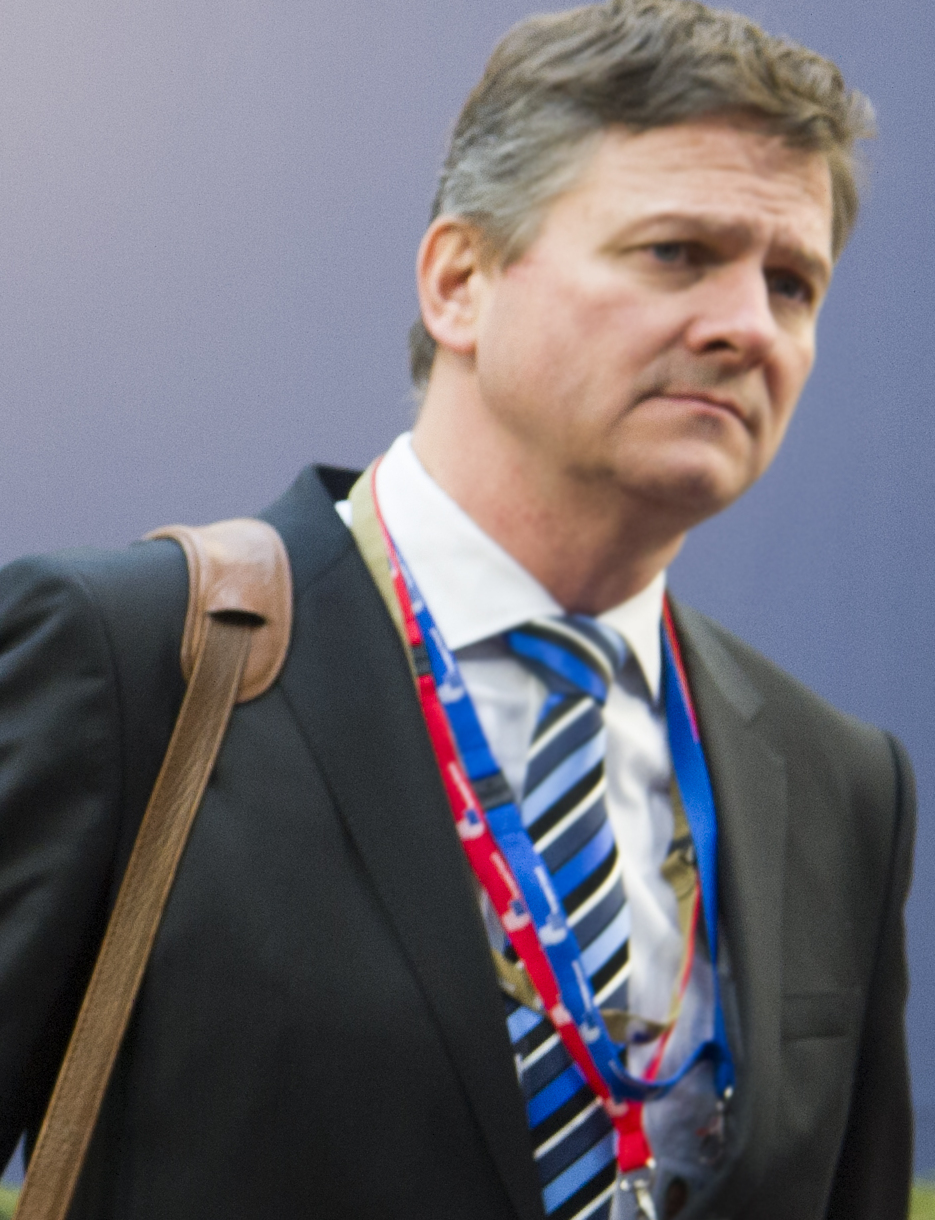
- Christensen in 2016.

Ambassador of Denmark to China
- Incumbent
- Assumed office 15 August 2024
- Monarch: Frederik X
- Prime Minister: Mette Frederiksen

Ambassador of Denmark to France
- In office 1 September 2019 – 14 August 2024
- Monarchs: Margrethe II; Frederik X
- Prime Minister: Mette Frederiksen
- Preceded by: Kirsten Malling Biering
- Succeeded by: Hanne Fugl Eskjær

Permanent Under-Secretary of State for Foreign Affairs
- In office 2015–2019
- Prime Minister: Helle Thorning-Schmidt; Lars Løkke Rasmussen
- Preceded by: Lars Gert Lose
- Succeeded by: Jean-Charles Ellermann-Kingombe

Personal details
- Education: University of Copenhagen; Harvard Kennedy School

Michael Starbæk Christensen is Danish diplomat and civil servant. He is the current Ambassador of Denmark to China, having previously served as Ambassador of Denmark to France, Permanent Under Secretary of State for Foreign Affairs at the Prime Minister's Office (2015–2019), under Prime Minister Helle Thorning-Schmidt and Lars Løkke Rasmussen.

Starbæk has held several positions within the Danish Ministry of Foreign Affairs and the Prime Minister's Office. He served as Under Secretary for Global Politics and Security and Political Director at the Ministry of Foreign Affairs from 2013 to 2015. He was the Deputy Head of Cabinet of European Commissioner for Climate Action, Connie Hedegaard, from 2010 to 2013, and Senior Adviser on Climate at the Prime Minister's Office from 2007 to 2010, under Prime Minister Anders Fogh Rasmussen and Løkke.

== Early life and education ==
In 1987, he obtained a Master of Laws (cand.jur.) from the University of Copenhagen. He also holds a 2004 Master of Public Administration from the Harvard Kennedy School.

== Career ==
Described as being "classically trained in the Danish Foreign Service", Starbæk started his diplomatic career as head of section in the Ministry of Foreign Affairs, a position he held from 1999 to 2003. From 2004 to 2007, he served as counsellor and second-in-command at the Mission of Denmark to the United Nations in New York. He served in this role during the Danish membership of the United Nations Security Council, and functioned as alternate representative to the council. He has also been posted at the Royal Danish Embassy in Moscow, Russia.

In around 2002, Starbæk had attracted attention as one of the co-signatories of a statement in which employees in the Ministry of Foreign Affairs voiced their frustrations about the consequences of the government's stringent financial austerity plans.

In 2007, he was appointed Senior Adviser in the newly established Climate Secretariat at the Prime Minister's Office, in preparation for the 2009 United Nations Climate Change Conference in Copenhagen. The secretariat was headed by Bo Lidegaard, and he served under Prime Minister Anders Fogh Rasmussen and Lars Løkke Rasmussen. During the summit, he served as the Danish "top negotiator". Immediately following the finalization of the diplomatic agreements of the climate summit, the then Minister for Climate, Connie Hedegaard, was nominated to take over Denmark's seat in the EU Commission, and she hand-picked Starbæk, then described as a "top diplomat", to accompany her to Brussels. He was subsequently appointed her Deputy Head of Cabinet.

In 2013, Starbæk was recalled and installed as Under Secretary for Global Politics and Security and Political Director at the Ministry of Foreign Affairs. He held this position under Minister of Foreign Affairs Villy Søvndal, Holger K. Nielsen and lastly Martin Lidegaard. In 2015, he was seconded to the Prime Minister's Office, where he served as the Permanent Under Secretary of State for Foreign Affairs, under Prime Minister Helle Thorning-Schmidt and Lars Løkke Rasmussen. In this capacity, he was described by the news media as the "tall man who often stands right behind the Foreign Minister and helps keep track of the more complex European and security policy matters".

In 2019, Starbæk assumed his first ambassadorial appointment, becoming Ambassador of Denmark to France. During his time as ambassador, Starbæk has advocated for e.g. increased Danish investments in French Hydrogen train development.

In the 2024 ambassadorial reshuffle, Starbæk was appointed Ambassador of Denmark to China.

== Honours ==
=== National ===
- Denmark:
  - Knight of the Order of the Dannebrog (2016)
