= Denmark–Saudi Arabia relations =

- Denmark: Saudi Arabia

Envoy
- Danish Ambassador to Saudi Arabia, Liselotte Plesner: Saudi Arabian Ambassador to Denmark, Abdulrahman Saad A.Al-Hadlg

Denmark–Saudi Arabia relations are the bilateral relations between Denmark and Saudi Arabia. Denmark has an embassy in Riyadh, and Saudi Arabia has an embassy in Copenhagen.

== Economic relations ==
In 2017, Denmark exported 7.22 billion DKK worth of goods and services to Saudi Arabia, and imported 1.13 billion DKK. This made Saudi Arabia Denmark's 22nd largest export market. The main exports were "miscellaneous foods" (1.7 billion DKK) and "medical and pharmaceutical products" (1.6 billion DKK).

== Controversies ==
In January 2006, in the context of the Muhammed drawings controversy, Saudi Arabia recalled its ambassador "because of the Danish government's lack of action towards insults against the prophet Muhammed in the newspapers of the country". The ambassador returned in September of the same year.

In November 2018, the Danish Ministry of Foreign Affairs announced that it would suspend approvals for export of weapons to Saudi Arabia, in light of the latter's policies in Yemen, the assassination of Jamal Khashoggi and discussions among EU ministers of foreign affairs.

On 3 February 2019, Denmark said that it has arrested three Iranian suspects of spying for the Saudi regime. The Danish police said that the suspects are members of the Iranian opposition group that attacked a military parade in Ahvaz in 2018. The Danish intelligence service stated that the suspects had spied on individuals in Denmark between 2012 and 2018. Netherlands has also arrested a 40 years old man who is part of the Iranian opposition group; Danish security service chief Finn Borch Andersen said that the arrests in Denmark were related to the arrest in the Netherlands.

== Resident diplomatic missions ==
- Denmark has an embassy in Riyadh.
- Saudi Arabia has an embassy in Copenhagen.
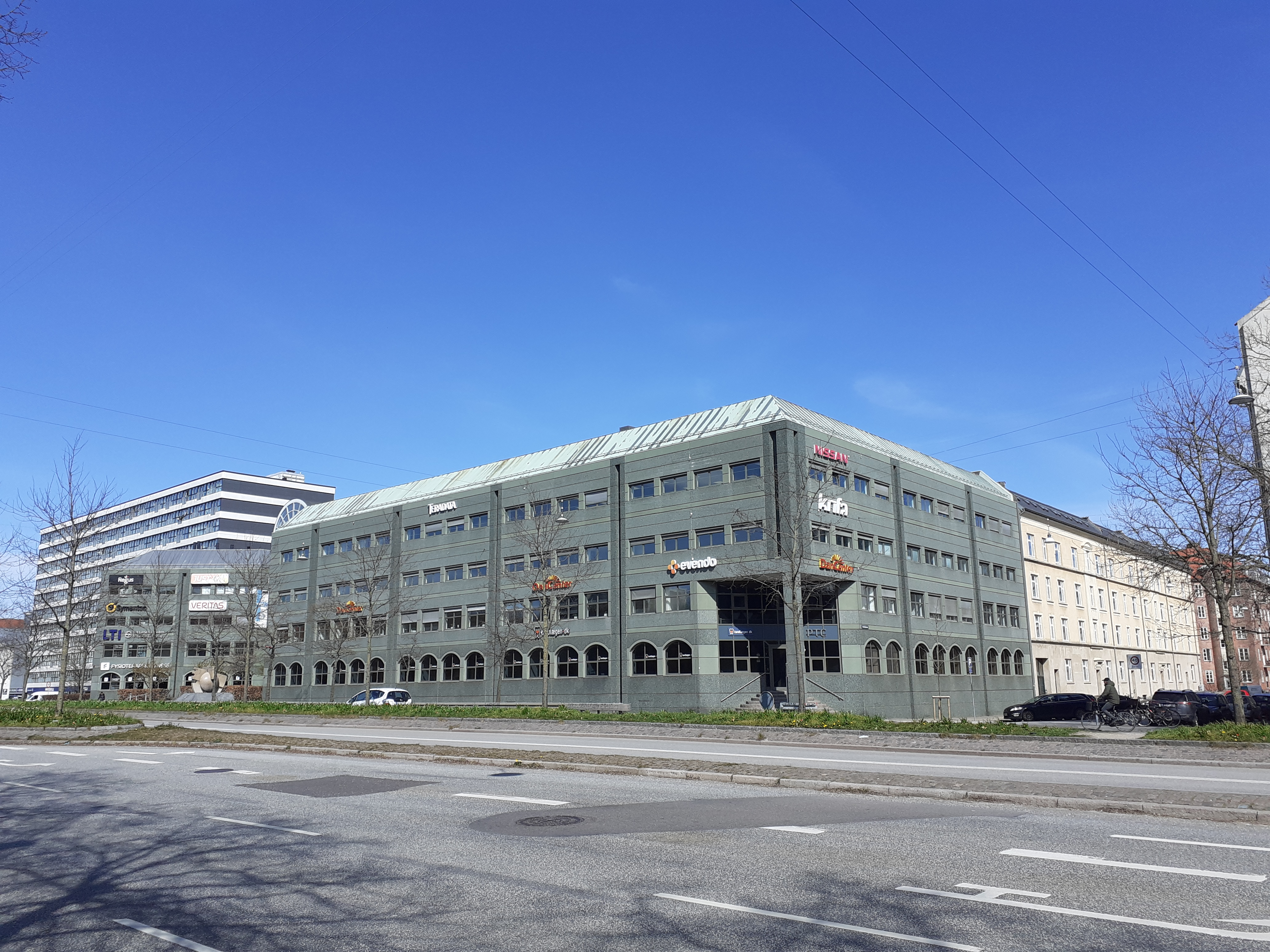
Embassy of Saudi Arabia in Copenhagen

== See also ==
- Foreign relations of Denmark
- Foreign relations of Saudi Arabia
