= Egelund =

Egelund is a surname. Notable people with the surname include:

- Anette Egelund (born 1956), Danish politician
- Christina Egelund (born 1977), Danish politician
- Helene Egelund (born 1965), Danish actress
- Jan Egeland (born 1957), Norwegian diplomat
- Niels Egelund (born 1946), Danish diplomat
- Patrick Egelund (born 2000), Danish footballer

== See also ==
- Egelund House
