= Jakob Linulf =

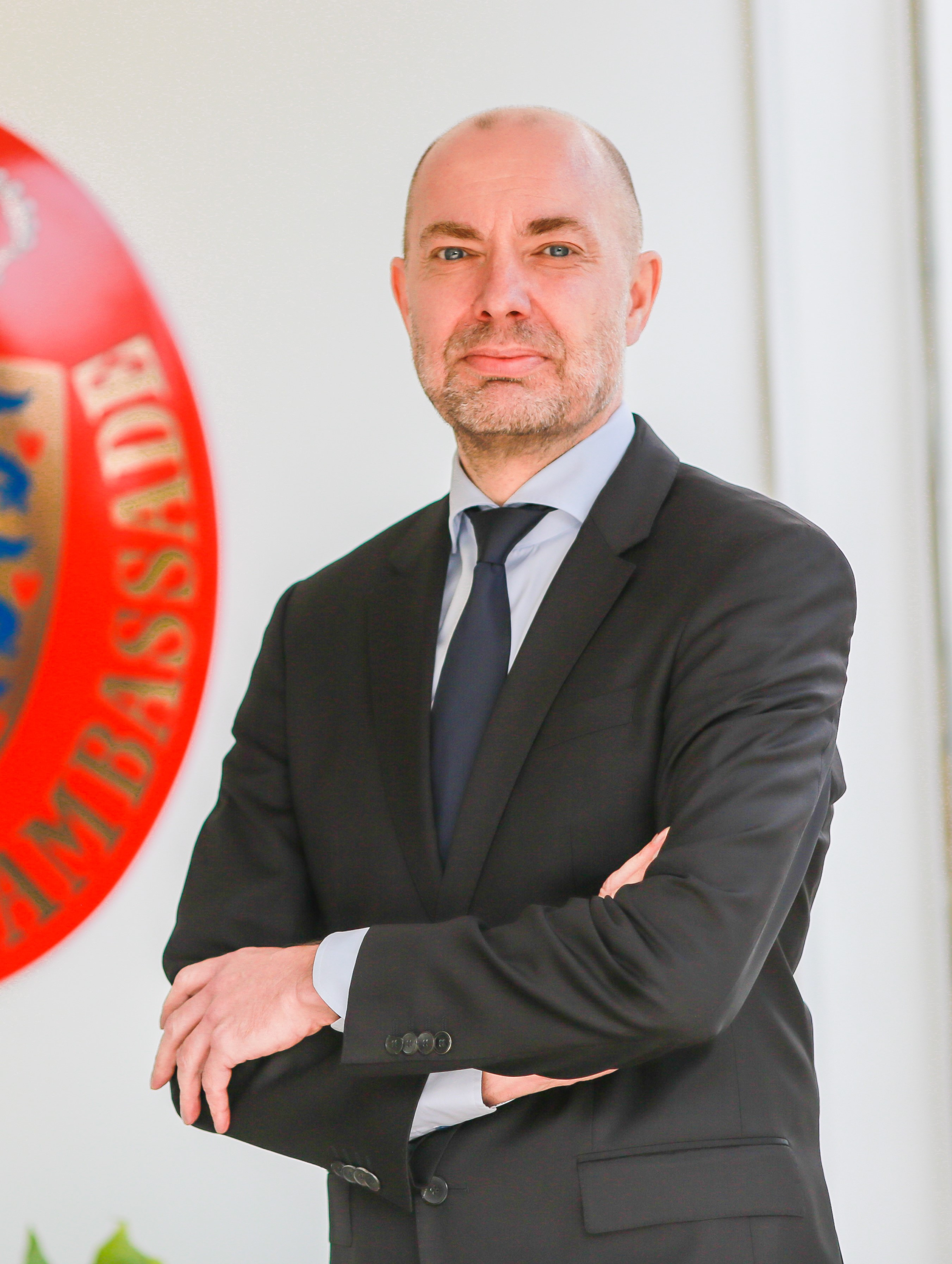

Ambassador of Denmark to Ghana with side-accreditation to Côte d'Ivoire, Sierra Leone, Liberia, Togo, and Guinea-Conakry.
- Incumbent
- Assumed office 1 August 2025

Personal details
- Born: 25 November 1970 (age 54) Frederikssund, Denmark

Jakob Linulf (born 25 November 1970) is a Danish diplomat currently serving as the Ambassador of Denmark to Ghana with side-accreditation to Côte d'Ivoire, Sierra Leone, Liberia, Togo, and Guinea-Conakry.

== Early life and education ==
Jakob Linulf was born on 25 November 1970 in Frederikssund, Denmark.

Growing up on a farm in the Danish country side, Linulf completed basic schooling from Førslev Centralskole near the town Fuglebjerg. Subsequently he graduated with a business high school degree from Zealand Business College in Slagelse.

In 1999, Linulf obtained a Master of Economics (Cand. Oecon.) from Aalborg University, specialising within international relations and development.

From 1996 to 2000, Linulf worked as lecturer and assistant professor, including at Roskilde University. He holds an official certification as college lecturer.

== Diplomatic career ==
Linulf began his diplomatic career with the Ministry of Foreign Affairs in 2000. Throughout his 25 years of service, Linulf has been dedicated to promotion of trade and investment, international development cooperation and climate action. He holds special geographical expertise on Africa and Asia. His first posting with the Danish Foreign Service was in Burkina Faso.

From 2016 to 2022, Linulf served as Danish diplomat in China. First at the Embassy of Denmark in Beijing. Later as Consul General in Shanghai, where he was also designated Dean of Shanghai's Diplomatic Corps in 2021-2022.

During Linulf's tenure as Denmark's ambassador to Pakistan in 2022-2025, Denmark and Pakistan expanded cooperation within climate action and green transition. The two countries entered a long-term green work programme and concluded a Government-to-Government agreement on sustainable investments. In 2024, Denmark and Pakistan celebrated 75 years anniversary of diplomatic relations with signing of several new business partnerships.

== Personal life ==
Jakob Linulf has three grown-up children. He is also an athlete, completing several marathons every year.

== Honours ==
Jakob Linulf was awarded Knight of the Order of the Dannebrog in 2020.
