= Permanent Under-Secretary of State for Foreign Affairs (Denmark) =

Danish government official

- Departementsråd for Udenrigspolitik
- Seal of the Prime Minister's Office of Denmark.

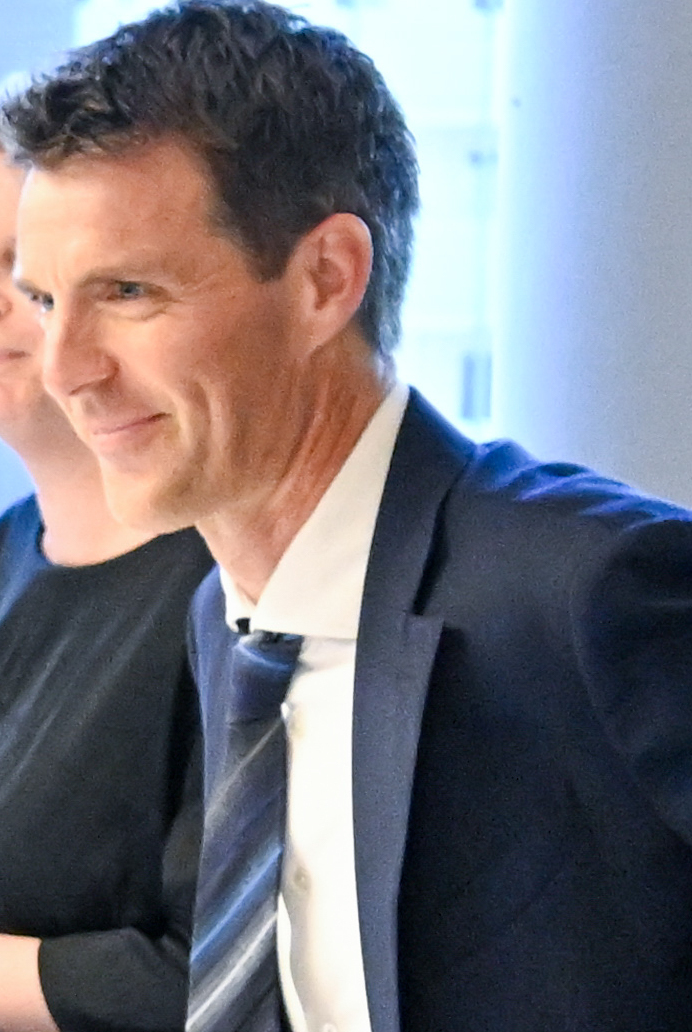
- Incumbent; Anders Tang Friborg since 2024
- Prime Minister's Office of Denmark
- Type: Permanent Under Secretary of State
- Reports to: Permanent Secretary
- Seat: Christiansborg, Copenhagen, Denmark
- Appointer: The prime minister
- Term length: No fixed term
- Inaugural holder: Niels Egelund
- Formation: 1995
- Salary: 1,730,356 DKK (2024) (€232,000) annually

The Permanent Under-Secretary of State for Foreign Affairs (Danish: Departementsråd for Udenrigspolitik) is a senior diplomatic official within the Prime Minister's Office of Denmark, who serves as the principal advisor to the Prime Minister of Denmark on foreign affairs, security policy and all national security issues. The officeholder serves a role roughly equivalent to that of the National Security Advisor in the United States. It is considered one of the most influential civil service positions in shaping Danish foreign policy.

Heading the Foreign Policy Division, the postholder functions as the head of government's top diplomat and political “sherpa” during international summits. Though similar in appellation, it is distinct from both the Permanent Secretary of State for Foreign Affairs (Danish: Departementschef i Udenrigsministeriet), the highest civil servant in the Danish Ministry of Foreign Affairs, as well as the State Secretary for Foreign Policy (Danish: Direktør for Udenrigspolitik), also a senior official in the MFA.

Formally a Permanent Under Secretary of State (Danish: Departementsråd, lit. 'Departmental Counsellor.'), the office was established following an organizational restructuring in 1995, and ranks immediately below the Permanent Secretary. Prior to its formal establishment, however, the Prime Minister had several foreign and security policy advisors.

== History ==
The position was created in 1995 as part of a major organizational restructuring under Prime Minister Poul Nyrup Rasmussen. This reform aimed to strengthen the Prime Minister’s role in foreign policy coordination and led to the creation of a dedicated foreign policy division within the Prime Minister's Office. As part of the restructuring, the Prime Minister’s Office was streamlined into three main divisions: foreign policy and security affairs, domestic policy and economic affairs, and lastly government coordination and legal affairs.

The Foreign Policy Division became responsible for Denmark’s international relations, EU and Nordic cooperation, international economic policy, and security and defence matters, including NATO affairs. By integrating these areas directly into the Prime Minister’s Office, the government sought to enhance strategic coherence and ensure more direct political control over key foreign policy decisions.

The office is widely regarded as the Danish "counterpart" to the United States National Security Advisor and is indeed at times referred to as the "National Security Advisor to the Prime Minister of Denmark". In Sweden, the government decided in 2022 to appoint a National Security Advisor (Swedish: Regeringens Nationella Säkerhetsrådgivare), tasked with assisting and advising both the National Security Council and the Prime Minister. In Denmark, subsequent proposals to formalise an explicitly designated national security advisory role within the Prime Minister’s Office have drawn inspiration from the Swedish model. Political scientist Mikkel Vedby Rasmussen has argued that a similar arrangement would strengthen strategic coordination and oversight of national security at the centre of government.

== Responsibilities ==
The Permanent Under-Secretary for Foreign Affairs leads the Foreign Policy Division within the Prime Minister's Office and is responsible for:

- Providing advice to the Prime Minister on foreign and security policy.
- Representing the Prime Minister’s Office in a preparatory capacity at international summits and high-level diplomatic engagements.
- Overseeing issues related to foreign affairs and international economic issues, including the EU, Nordic cooperation and issues relating to security and defence, including NATO.

Like the majority of other staff in the Prime Minister's Office, the post-holder is seconded by government ministries, in this case the Ministry of Foreign Affairs. This often means that the incumbent has considerable diplomatic experience, and after finishing their service in the Prime Minister's Office, they are often assigned to major diplomatic posts or senior civil service positions.

== List of officeholders ==
Permanent Under-Secretaries for Foreign Affairs at the Prime Minister's Office
#	Portrait	Name (Birth–Death)	Term of Office	Tenure
1		Niels Egelund (born 1946)	1995 – 1999	4 years
2		Per Poulsen-Hansen (born 1946)	1999 – 2003	4 years
3		Michael P. Zilmer-Johns (born 1959)	2003 – 2005	2 years
4		Bo Lidegaard (born 1958)	2005 – 2007	2 years
5		Thomas Ahrenkiel (born 1967)	2007 – 2010	3 years
6		Ulrik Vestergaard Knudsen (born 1969)	2010 – 2013	3 years
7		Lars Gert Lose (born 1969)	2013 – 2015	2 years
8		Michael Starbæk Christensen (born 1974)	2015 – 2019	4 years
9		Jean-Charles Ellermann-Kingombe (born 1970)	2019 – 2024	5 years
10		Anders Tang Friborg (born 1974)	2024 – Present	—
