= Sofie Lindskov Hansen =

Danish quantum physicist

- Education: Niels Bohr Institute; Rigshospitalet
- Scientific career
- Workplaces: Kvantify; Sparrow Quantum; University of Copenhagen; Ministry of Foreign Affairs (Denmark)
- Thesis: Single-Photon Manipulation in Nanophotonic Circuits (2017)

Sofie Lindskov Hansen is a Danish quantum physicist who is the Chief Quantum Expert for the Danish Tech Ambassador in the Danish Ministry of Foreign Affairs. Her research considered photonic integrated circuits and quantum computing for molecular simulation. She has worked between academia, industry and policymaking.

== Early life and education ==
Hansen was an undergraduate student at Rigshospitalet as a medical student. She completed her doctoral research on photonic integrated circuits at the Niels Bohr Institute. She was a postdoctoral researcher at the University of Copenhagen, where she was awarded funding from the Lundbeck Foundation to develop a quantum chip to simulate molecular dynamics at a quantum level. She proposed to start with water molecules, and scale up to more complex systems that could one day impact drug design. In 2022, Hansen left academia to work in a quantum company.

== Career ==
Hansen worked at Kvantify, a Danish quantum computing company, and Sparrow Quantum, a photonic quantum chip company. At Sparrow, Hansen worked on business development, where she explored use cases of quantum computing.

Hansen is the Chief Quantum Expert for the Danish Tech Ambassador in the Danish Ministry of Foreign Affairs.

== Selected publications ==
- M Arcari; I Söllner; A Javadi; et al. (29 August 2014). "Near-unity coupling efficiency of a quantum emitter to a photonic crystal waveguide". Physical Review Letters. 113 (9) 093603. arXiv:1402.2081. Bibcode:2014PhRvL.113i3603A. doi:10.1103/physrevlett.113.093603. ISSN 0031-9007. PMID 25215983. Wikidata Q51508790.
- Immo Söllner; Sahand Mahmoodian; Sofie Lindskov Hansen; et al. (27 July 2015). "Deterministic photon-emitter coupling in chiral photonic circuits". Nature Nanotechnology. 10 (9): 775–778. arXiv:1406.4295. Bibcode:2015NatNa..10..775S. doi:10.1038/nnano.2015.159. ISSN 1748-3387. PMID 26214251. Wikidata Q48154071.
- A Javadi; I Söllner; M Arcari; et al. (23 October 2015). "Single-photon non-linear optics with a quantum dot in a waveguide". Nature Communications. 6: 8655. arXiv:1504.06895. Bibcode:2015NatCo...6.8655J. doi:10.1038/ncomms9655. ISSN 2041-1723. PMC 4639909. PMID 26492951. Wikidata Q30396612.
