= Denmark–North Macedonia relations =

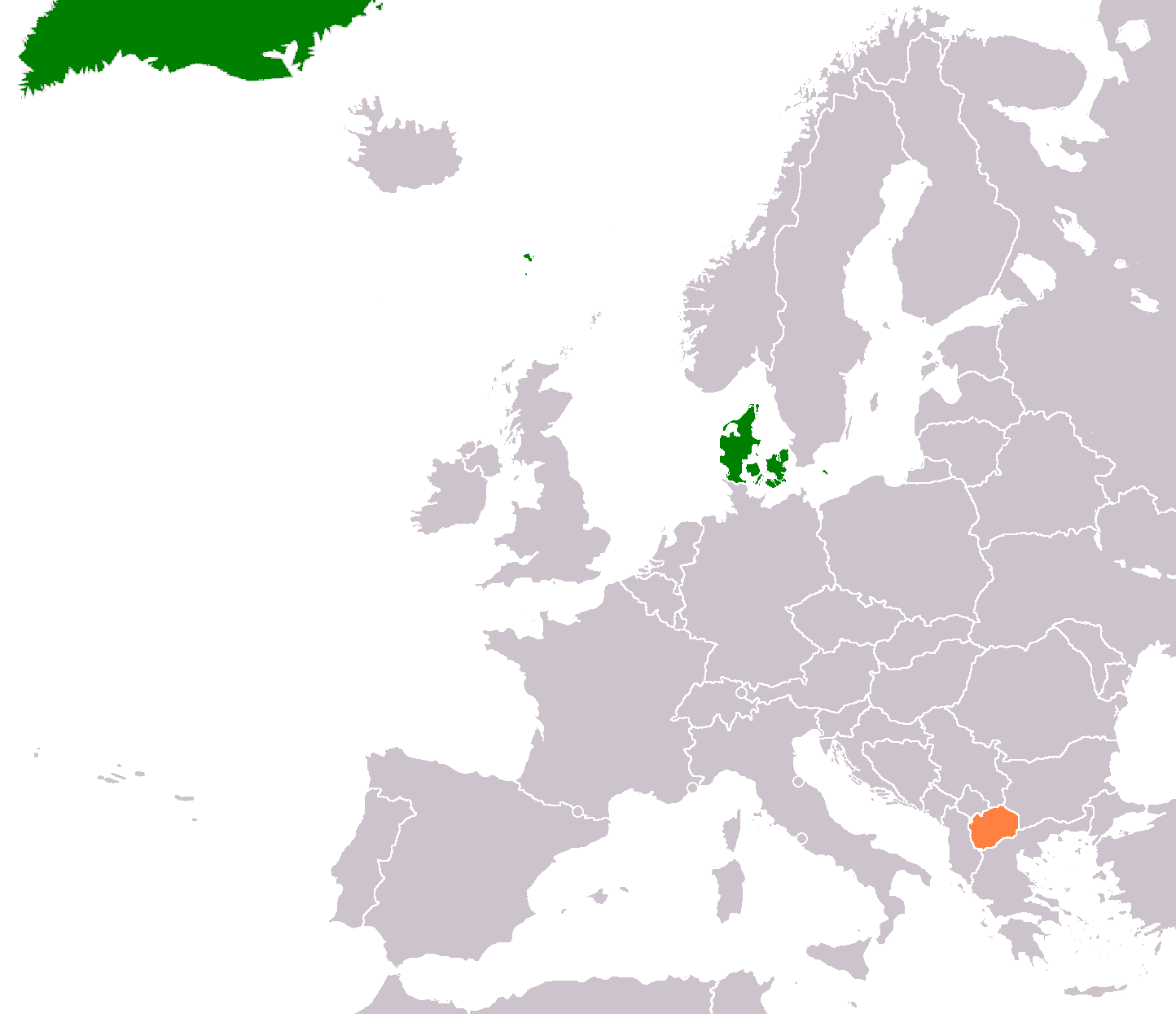

- Denmark: North Macedonia

Denmark–North Macedonia relations refers to the bilateral relations between Denmark and North Macedonia. Both countries are members of the Council of Europe, and NATO. Also Denmark is an EU member and North Macedonia is an EU candidate. The Danish embassy in Vienna, Austria is responsible for its relations with North Macedonia and North Macedonia has an embassy in Copenhagen. Denmark recognized North Macedonia on 16 December 1993. Denmark has had an ambassador in Vienna accredited with North Macedonia since January 1994. North Macedonia has maintained an embassy in Copenhagen since 1996.

== High level visits ==
On 1 April 2002, Danish Foreign Minister Per Stig Møller visited North Macedonia, where he met the Prime Minister of North Macedonia Ljupčo Georgievski.

== Aid ==
Denmark assists North Macedonia in strengthening civil society and free media. In the South East Europe Programme, Denmark assists in the four main areas: youth, refugees and displaced persons, human rights, and mass media. 159 million DKK has been given to the programme, and 73 million DKK again in 2004.

== Resident diplomatic missions ==
- Denmark is accredited to North Macedonia from its embassy in Belgrade, Serbia.
- North Macedonia has an embassy in Copenhagen.

== See also ==
- Foreign relations of Denmark
- Foreign relations of North Macedonia
- Accession of North Macedonia to the EU
- NATO-EU relations
