= Resident Representative =

UN agency head representative to a country

A resident representative is the head of a United Nations agency (such as UNDP, UNICEF, WHO) in a given country. As such, the resident representative has the same rank as an ambassador of a foreign state accredited to that country, under the Convention on the Privileges and Immunities of the United Nations.
