= Else Lidegaard =

Danish journalist (1933–2025)

Else Lidegaard (23 February 1933 – 4 August 2025) was a Danish journalist and author.

== Early life and career ==
Lidegaard was born in Røsnæs, near Kalundborg, on 23 February 1933. She was employed by Danmarks Radio for many years, from 1969 as a temporary employee and in the period 1976–96 as a permanent employee. At DR she produced over 150 broadcasts, most of them about cultural encounters, e.g. the series Med Danmark i Zimbabwe (1986) and Så er de andre (1991), but also literary portraits, including Grundtvig (1972), William Heinesen (1980) and Simone de Beauvoir (1983).

In 1974 she received the Rocking Chair Prize, for the broadcast Barbara, poem and reality. In addition, Lidegaard wrote travel books during stays in Africa and Patagonia.

She was the initiator of the movement Grandparents For Asylum.

== Personal life and death ==
Lidegaard was married to Mads Lidegaard, but divorced in 2003. They had four children, Øjvind, Kresten, Bo, and Martin. While her husband was a seminary teacher in Greenland from 1953 to 1961, she worked as a teacher at the secondary school and for the Greenland Radio.

Lidegaard died on 4 August 2025, at the age of 92.
