= Denmark–Slovenia relations =

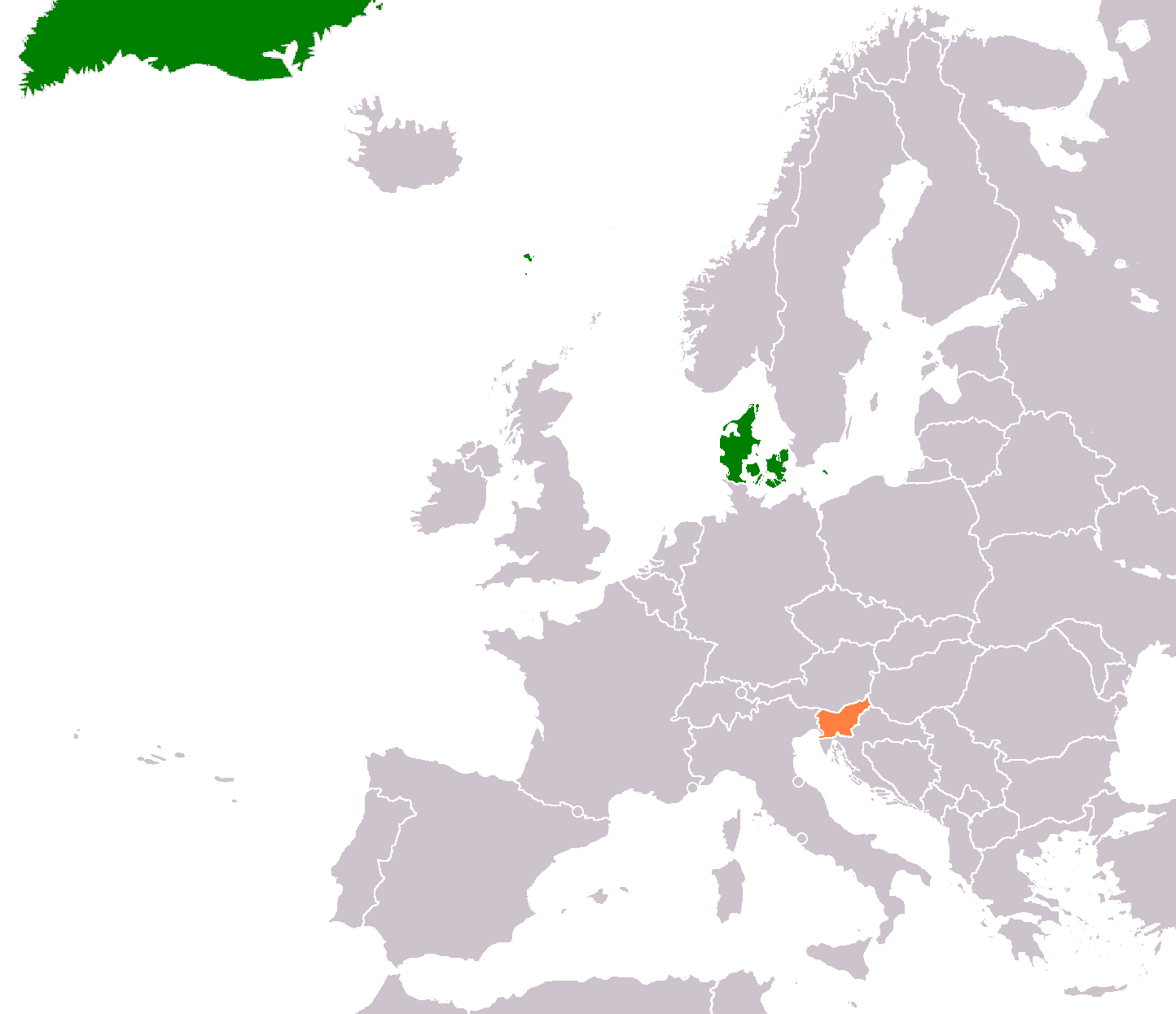

- Denmark: Slovenia

Diplomatic relations between Denmark and Slovenia were established on 20 January 1992. Denmark has a non resident ambassador in Budapest. Slovenia has an embassy in Copenhagen. Both countries are members of the European Union and NATO. There have been few ties between Denmark and Slovenia before the independence of Slovenia.

== High level visits ==
In 2001, Queen Margrethe II visited Slovenia. In 2002, Danish prime minister Anders Fogh Rasmussen visited Slovenia, to support Slovenia in the European Union.

== See also ==
- Foreign relations of Denmark
- Foreign relations of Slovenia
