= Albania–Denmark relations =

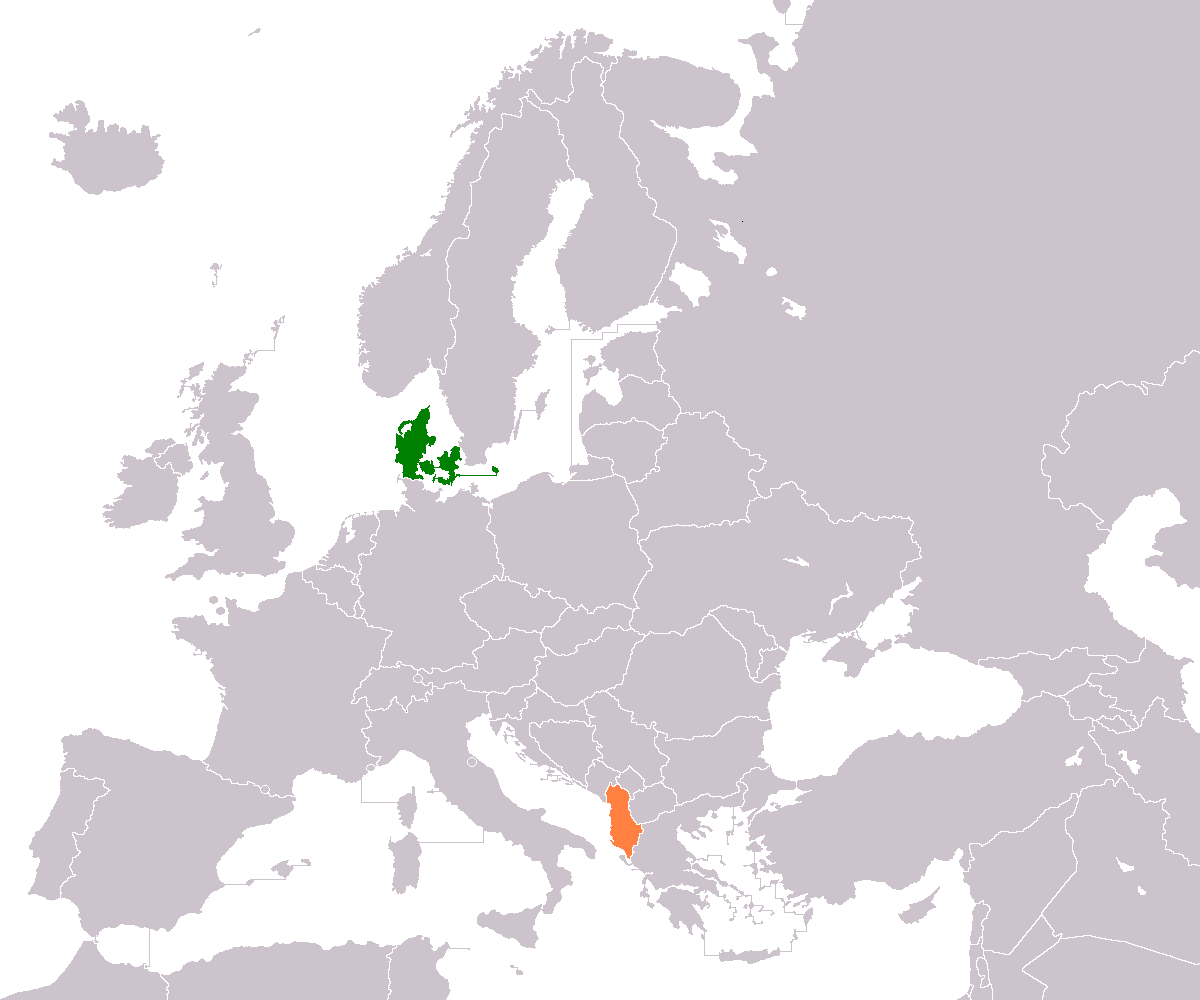
- Denmark: Albania

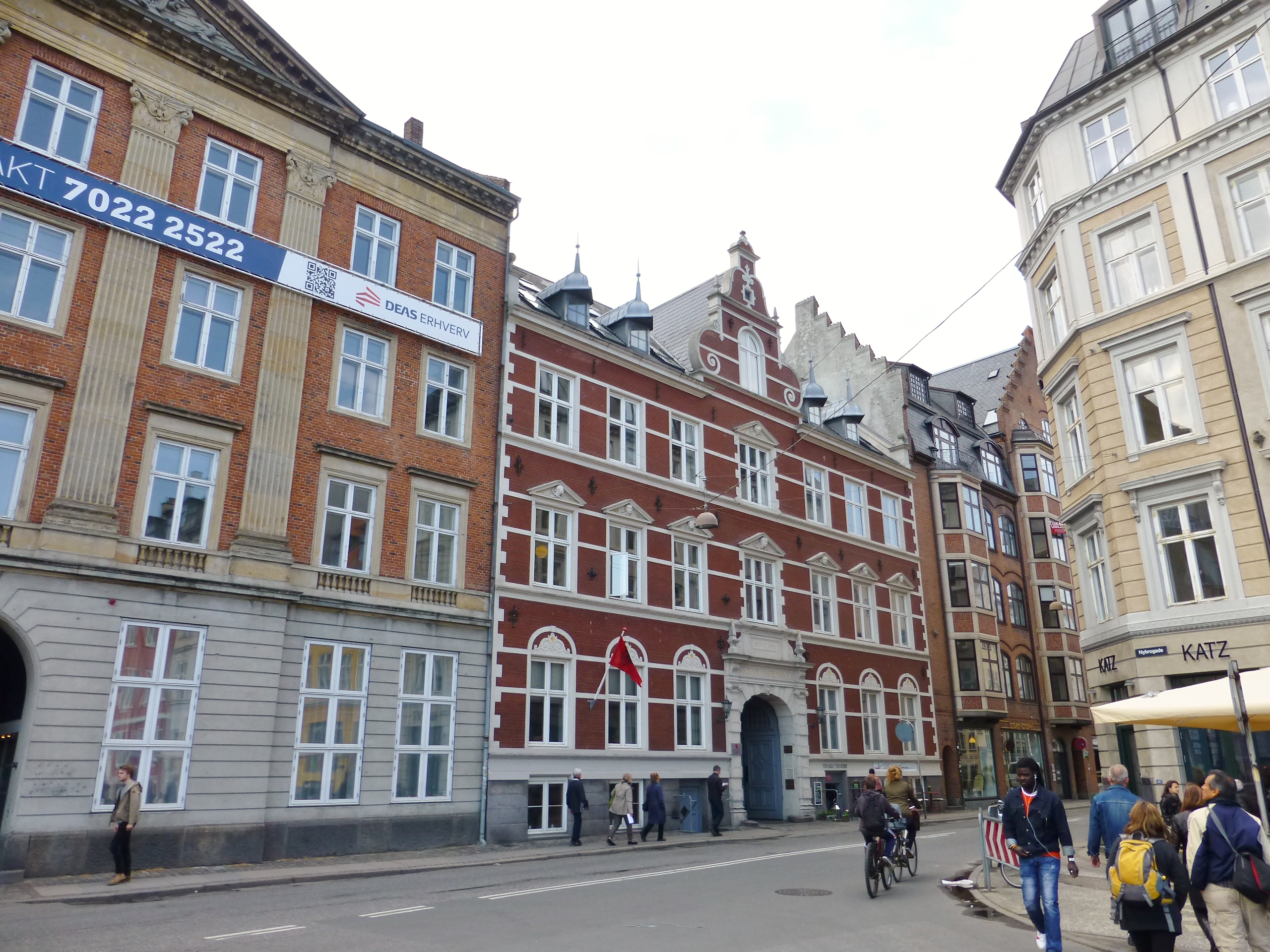
Albanian Embassy in Copenhagen

Albania has an embassy in Copenhagen, and Denmark has an embassy in Tirana. Both countries are members of NATO. Also Albania is an EU candidate and Denmark is an EU member. Diplomatic relations were established in 1970. On 23 June 1971, a trade agreement was signed.

== High level visits ==
In 2006, Danish Foreign Minister Per Stig Møller visited Albania. The visit focused on cooperation and political issues. 3 million DKK were allocated on human rights and good governance.

In May 2012, Danish Foreign Minister Villy Søvndal and Minister of European Affairs Nicolai Wammen met with the Albanian Vice-President and Foreign Minister Edmond Haxhinasto in Denmark, to discuss the situation in Kosovo.

In March 2023, Mette Frederiksen became the first prime minister of Denmark to visit Albania.

== Assistance and cooperation ==
After the fall of the communist Albania, Denmark assisted with the building institutions and aid to the poor parts of Albania.

Denmark also assists Albania with civil society and independent media. Albania is part of the Danish South East Europe Programme. 73 million DKK has been given to the programme. In September 2009, a programme for sustainable business development was launched.

In 2006, Denmark signed an agreement to assist Albania implementing the Clean Development Mechanism (CDM) protocol and help reduce their emission of greenhouse gasses.

After the 2010 Albania floods, Denmark contributed with fodder and Danish ambassador for Albania, Karsten Ankjær Jensen said "It is vital that all good forces unite to help alleviate the disaster and suffering endured by everyone in the flooded areas. Hopefully our efforts will provide relief and ensure the livelihood of the affected farmers."

In September 2012, Danish Minister for Development Cooperation Christian Friis Bach visited Albania and Kosovo for the democratic and economic development.

After the devastating 2019 Albania earthquake Denmark provided a 2 Million euro recovery package to Albania. Shortly after, during the COVID-19 pandemic in Albania Denmark donated 30 ventilators and 250.000 COVID-19 vaccine doses to Albania to help combat the COVID-19 pandemic.

== Diaspora ==
About 8,000 Albanians live in Denmark.

== See also ==
- Foreign relations of Albania
- Foreign relations of Denmark
- Accession of Albania to the EU
- NATO-EU relations

== See also ==
- "Cooperation between Institute of Danish Culture and Albania". Shkoder.net. Archived from the original on 21 July 2011.
- "Speech delivered by the Danish Parliamentary Ombudsman, Mr. Hans Gammeltoft-Hansens, at the International Conference on the occasion of the 10th Anniversary of the establishment of the Institution of the People's Advocate in Albania". Republic of Albania People's Advocate. 10 December 2009. Archived from the original on 2 September 2010.
