= Lindegaard =

Lindegaard is a Danish surname. Notable people with the surname include:

- Anders Lindegaard (born 1984), Danish footballer
- Andy Lindegaard (born 1980), English footballer
- Jørgen Lindegaard (born 1948), Danish businessman
- Henri Lindegaard (1925–1996), French artist and pastor of Danish ancestry
