= Louise Bang Jespersen =

Danish diplomat

Lene Louise Bang Jespersen is a Danish diplomat. She is Ambassador to Norway.

== Career ==
In 1988, she received a study grant from the European Investment Bank. In 1996, she was 2nd secretary to the Ambassador to the United Kingdom. From 2010 to 2014, she was ambassador to Luxembourg.
