= Afghanistan–Denmark relations =

- Afghanistan: Denmark

Diplomatic mission
- Afghan Embassy, Oslo, Norway: Danish Embassy, Kabul (closed)

Envoy
- First Secretary Najibullah Sherkhan: none

Afghanistan–Denmark relations refer to diplomatic ties between Afghanistan and Denmark. Afghanistan is represented in Denmark through its embassy in Oslo, Norway. Denmark used to have an embassy in Kabul until it was closed in 2021 due to the Taliban takeover of Afghanistan. In 2010 Denmark had 760 soldiers in Afghanistan. As of 2024, Denmark has no soldiers deployed in Afghanistan. The last Danish troops were withdrawn in June 2021. As of the third quarter of 2024, 21,822 Afghans live in Denmark.

Diplomatic relations were established in 1947. On 24 May 1967, an air service agreement was signed in Kabul. On 2 March 1979, an agreement on a Danish loan to Afghanistan was signed.

== Danish military in Afghanistan ==
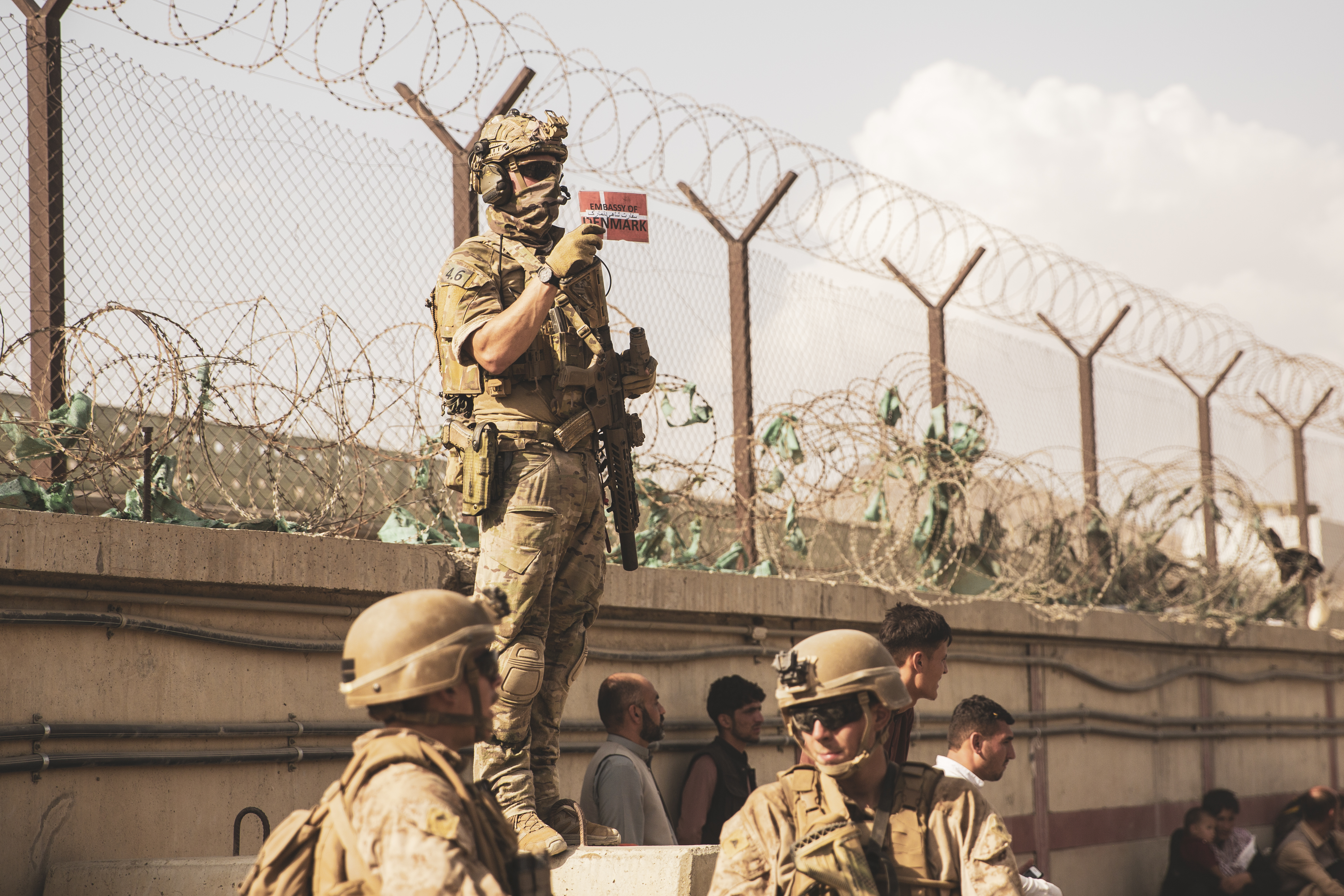
Danish soldier at Hamid Karzai International Airport during the 2021 Kabul Airlift.

2001-2021 the Royal Danish Army was involved in the War in Afghanistan as part of the ISAF. The Royal Danish Army with the British Army has been involved in clashes with the Taliban in the Helmand Province. Denmark had two of their F 16s in the Manas Air Base, Kyrgyzstan to support their forces in Afghanistan.

== Assistance ==
Danish Committee for Aid to Afghan Refugees is an organization, working in Afghanistan. The organization was created to support the Afghans, who had fled to Pakistan and Iran. Danish assistance to Afghanistan amounts $80 million each year. Since the fall of the Taleban in 2001, Denmark has supported Afghanistan with education and democratisation. In 2005, the Folketing approved 670 million DKK, for the rebuilding of Afghanistan.

During a visit to Afghanistan in November 2012, Danish Minister for Development Cooperation Christian Friis Bach declared that his government pledged US$100m in aid over the next 5 years.

== High level visits ==
On 28 January 2006, the Afghan president Hamid Karzai visited Anders Fogh Rasmussen in Marienborg, the summer residence of the Danish Prime Minister. In September 2009, Danish Prime Minister Anders Fogh Rasmussen visited Camp Bastion. On 23 June 2010, Danish Prime Minister Lars Løkke Rasmussen visited Afghanistan, where he met Hamid Karzai. On 10 January 2011, Afghan Foreign Minister Zalmai Rassoul visited Denmark, to discuss bilateral relations.

== See also ==
- Danish Committee for Aid to Afghan Refugees
