= Bo Lidegaard =

Danish author, editor, historian

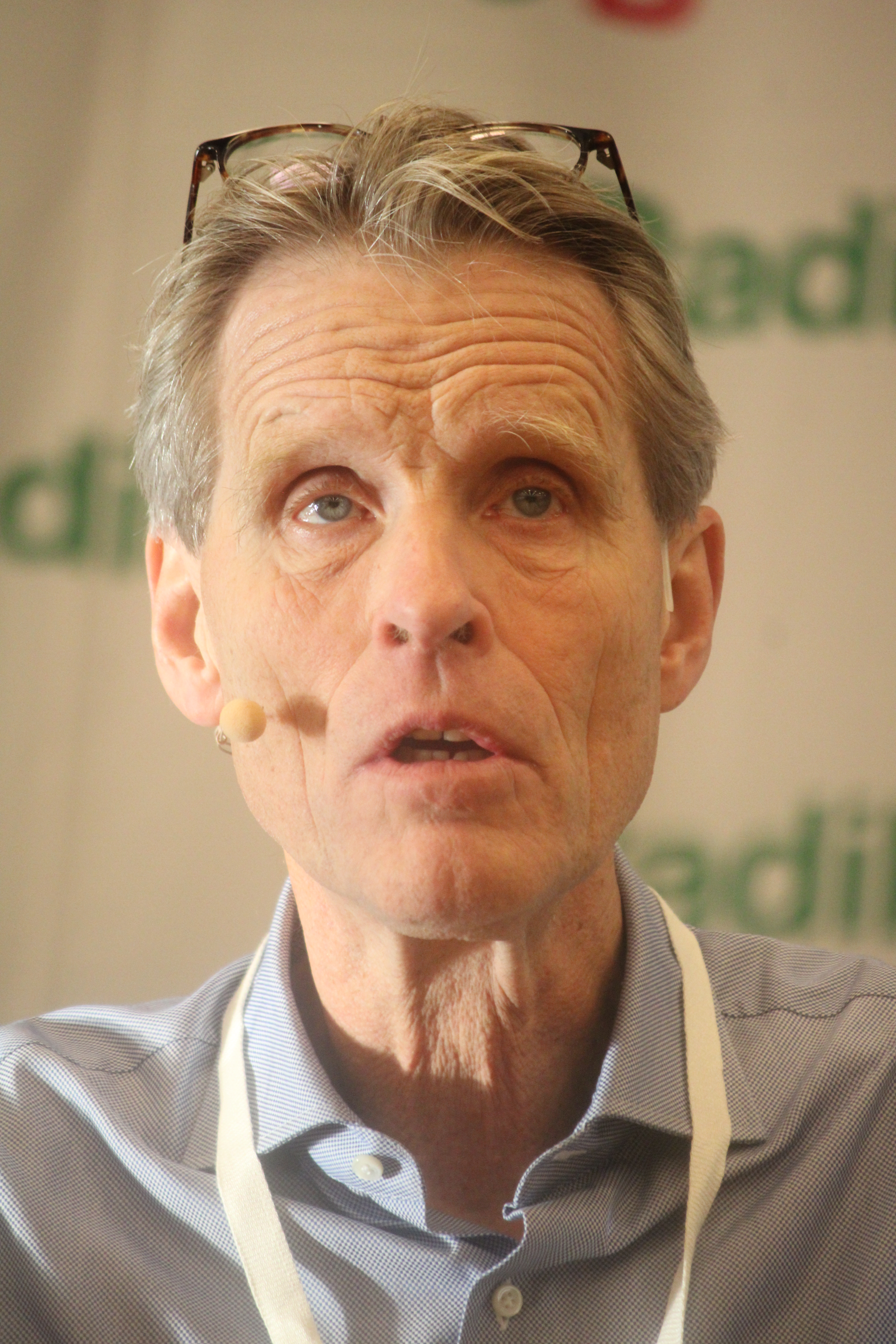
Lidegaard in 2026

Bo Lidegaard (born 23 January 1958) is a Danish historian, public intellectual, and former responsible editor-in-chief for Politiken. Bo Lidegaard worked in the Ministry of Foreign Affairs (1984–2005), was Ministerial Counselor and Ambassador in the Prime Minister's Office (2005–2011), and on 26 April 2011 was appointed editor-in-chief of Politiken, succeeding Tøger Seidenfaden. He is currently co-founder and Partner at Kaya Advisory, an advisory firm specialising in navigating climate and green transition policies and politics.

Bo Lidegaard is the son of high school teacher and author Mads Lidegaard and journalist and author Else Lidegaard. He is the brother of former Minister of Foreign Affairs Martin Lidegaard (RV), professor, dr.med. Øjvind Lidegaard and biologist Kresten Lidegaard. Bo Lidegaard became a student at Gentofte Statsskole in 1976 and in 1984 became a cand.phil. in history at the University of Copenhagen. In 1997 he began writing his dissertation on Henrik Kauffmann, which was published under the title In the King's name - Henrik Kauffmann in Danish diplomacy 1919-1958. It examined why the Danish envoy in Washington during World War II, Henrik Kauffmann, on his own initiative gave the Americans permission to establish air bases in Greenland. Lidegaard has since published ten books, mainly on Denmark's recent history, including a biography of Jens Otto Krag (2014). His book on the Danish people's efforts to help Danish Jews escape the Nazi regime in 1943, Countrymen (2013), has been published in 12 countries.

== Early life and education ==
Born in Godthåb, Lidegaard is the son of authors Mads Lidegaard and Else Lidegaard, and is the brother of Danish political figure Martin Lidegaard. Bo Lidegaard graduated from Gentofte Statsskole in 1976, and became cand. phil. in history at the University of Copenhagen in 1984. He received his PhD after completing a dissertation on Henrik Kauffmann in 1997.

== Career ==
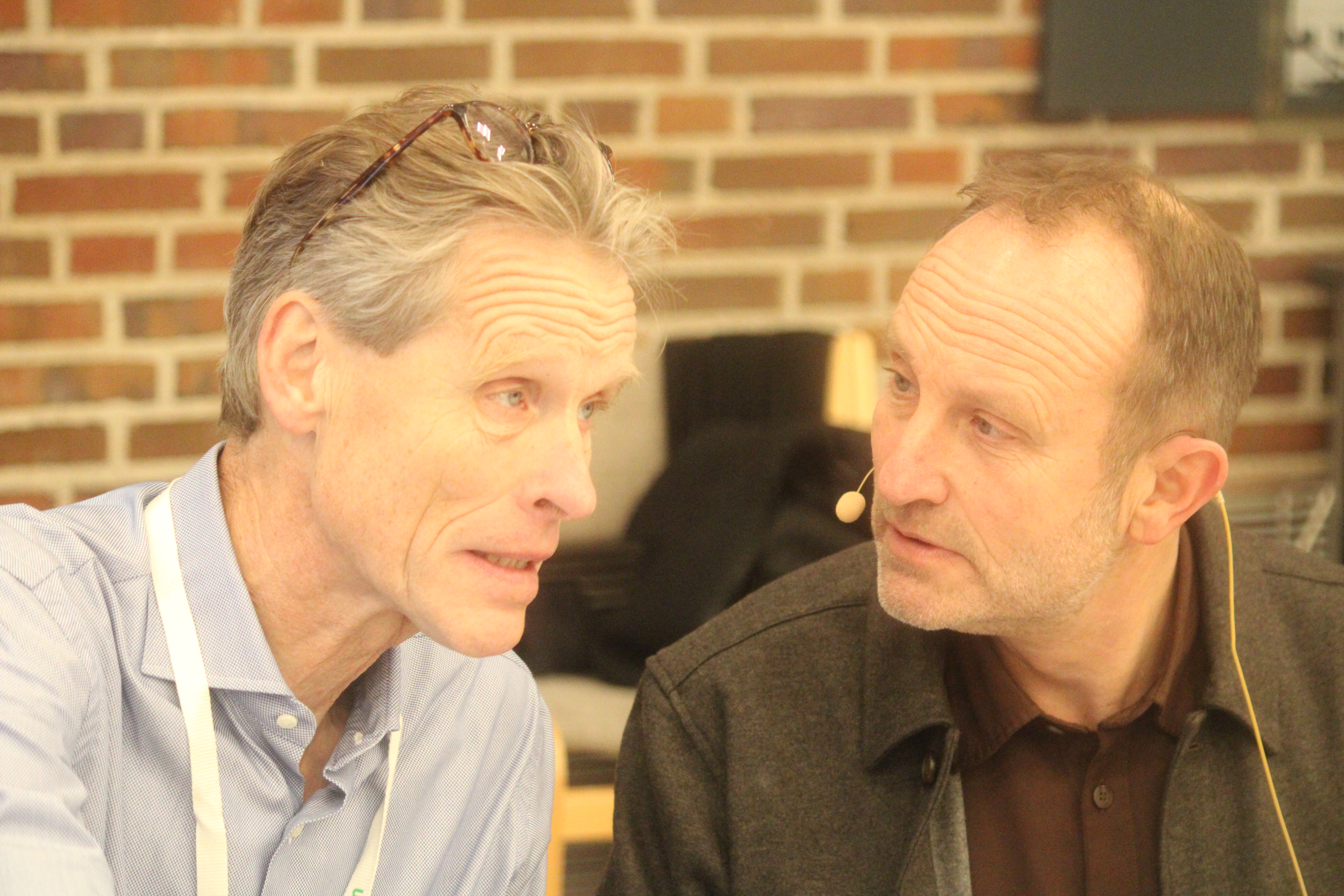
Lidegaard with his brother Martin Lidegaard in Nyborg, January 2026

Lidegaard has authored a number of books on Danish history.

Lidegaard started his diplomatic career in the Ministry of Foreign Affairs in 1984. He served at Danish representations in Geneva and Paris, before leaving the foreign service in 2000. In 2005 he joined the Ministry of the State, as Permanent Under-Secretary of State, initially heading the Foreign and Security Affairs section, and was later in charge of the Climate Change secretariat. During the build-up to COP 15, he headed the Danish overarching coordination secretariat, he proposed the development of what would become the controversial "Danish Text". In April 2011 Lidegaard accepted the offer to succeed deceased Tøger Seidenfaden as editor in chief of Politiken.

From 2021 to 2022, Lidegaard was a member of the Trilateral Commission’s Task Force on Global Capitalism in Transition, chaired by Carl Bildt, Kelly Grier and Takeshi Niinami.

== Other activities ==
- Trilateral Commission, Member of the European Group

== Bibliography ==
- Den højeste pris : Povl Bang-Jensen og FN 1955-59 ISBN 87-568-1499-2
- I kongens navn : Henrik Kauffmann i dansk diplomati 1919-1958 ISBN 87-638-0149-3
- Jens Otto Krag. Bind 1-2 ISBN 87-00-49686-3 og ISBN 87-02-02204-4
- Dansk udenrigspolitiks historie, bind 4: Overleveren – 1914-1945 ISBN 87-7789-093-0
- Kampen om Danmark 1933-1945 ISBN 87-02-03125-6
- H.C. Hansen ISBN 87-02-05396-9
- En fortælling om Danmark i det 20. århundrede ISBN 978-87-02-11277-1
- Landsmænd (2013) ISBN 978-87-400-0515-8, translated as Countrymen: The Untold Story of How Denmark's Jews Escaped the Nazis
- Uden Mandat (2020)

== Awards and honors ==
- Ebbe Munck's Prize of Honor (1997)
- Amalienborg Prize (1998) for the book I kongens navn
- The Rescue Award (1998)
- Sven Henningsen Prize (1999)
- Søren Gyldendal Prize (2002) for Jens Otto Krag. Volume 1-2 (biography)
- Knight 1st Class of Dannebrog (2004)
- Gyldendal's Non-Fiction Prize (2006)
