= Niels Egelund =

Danish diplomat (born 1946)

Niels Egelund (born July 4, 1946) is a Danish diplomat. From 1999 to 2003, he served as Denmark's Permanent Representative to NATO and from 2009 to 2009 as Ambassador to France. He was appointed as Under-Secretary and Political Director at the Ministry of Foreign Affairs with the personal rank of Ambassador in 1992, and was Chief Adviser on foreign and defence policy to Prime Minister Poul Nyrup Rasmussen from 1993 to 1999. He is a graduate of the University of Copenhagen and the College of Europe (1970-1971 promotion) in Bruges. He joined the Ministry of Foreign Affairs in 1972. He was awarded a Commander of the Order of the Dannebrog in 1998.
