= Martin Lidegaard =

Danish politician, leader of the Social Liberal Party

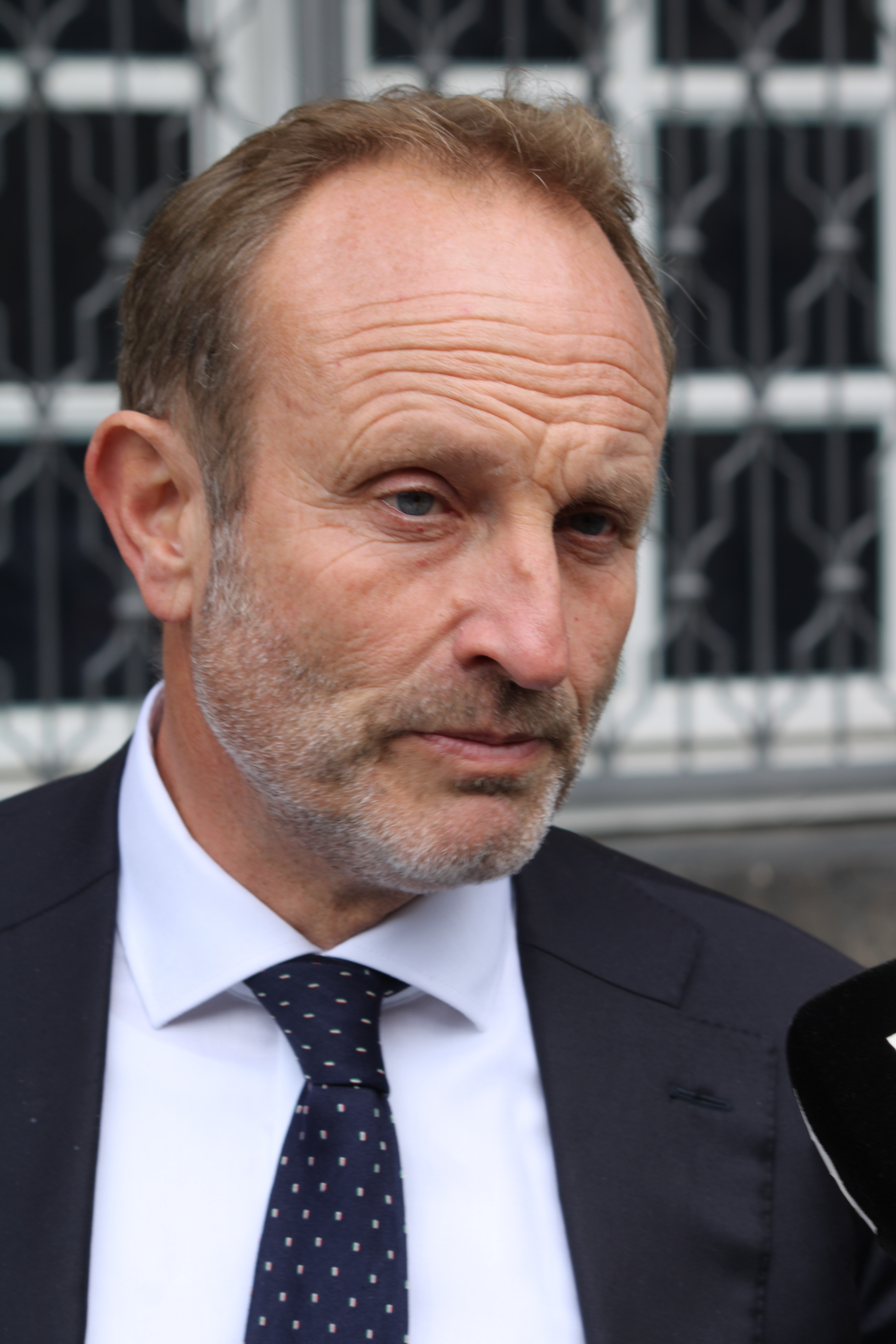
- Martin Lidegaard in 2025

Leader of the Social Liberal Party
- Incumbent
- Assumed office 3 November 2022
- Preceded by: Sofie Carsten Nielsen

Minister of Business and Competitiveness
- Incumbent
- Assumed office 3 June 2026
- Prime Minister: Mette Frederiksen
- Preceded by: Morten Bødskov

Minister of Foreign Affairs
- In office 3 February 2014 – 28 June 2015
- Prime Minister: Helle Thorning-Schmidt
- Preceded by: Holger K. Nielsen
- Succeeded by: Kristian Jensen

Minister of Climate, Energy and Building
- In office 3 October 2011 – 3 February 2014
- Prime Minister: Helle Thorning-Schmidt
- Preceded by: Lykke Friis
- Succeeded by: Rasmus Helveg Petersen

Member of the Folketing
- Incumbent
- Assumed office 18 June 2015
- Constituency: North Zealand
- In office 20 November 2001 – 13 November 2007
- Constituency: Roskilde (2005–2007); Vestre (2001–2005)

Personal details
- Born: 12 December 1966 (age 59) Copenhagen, Denmark
- Party: Social Liberal Party
- Relations: Bo Lidegaard (brother)
- Parent: Else Lidegaard (mother)
- Education: Roskilde University

Martin Lidegaard (born 12 December 1966) is a Danish politician and leader of the Danish Social Liberal Party since 2022. He was the foreign minister in the government of Prime Minister Helle Thorning-Schmidt from 2014 to 2015, having previously been the minister of climate, energy and building from 2011 to 2014.

== Political career ==
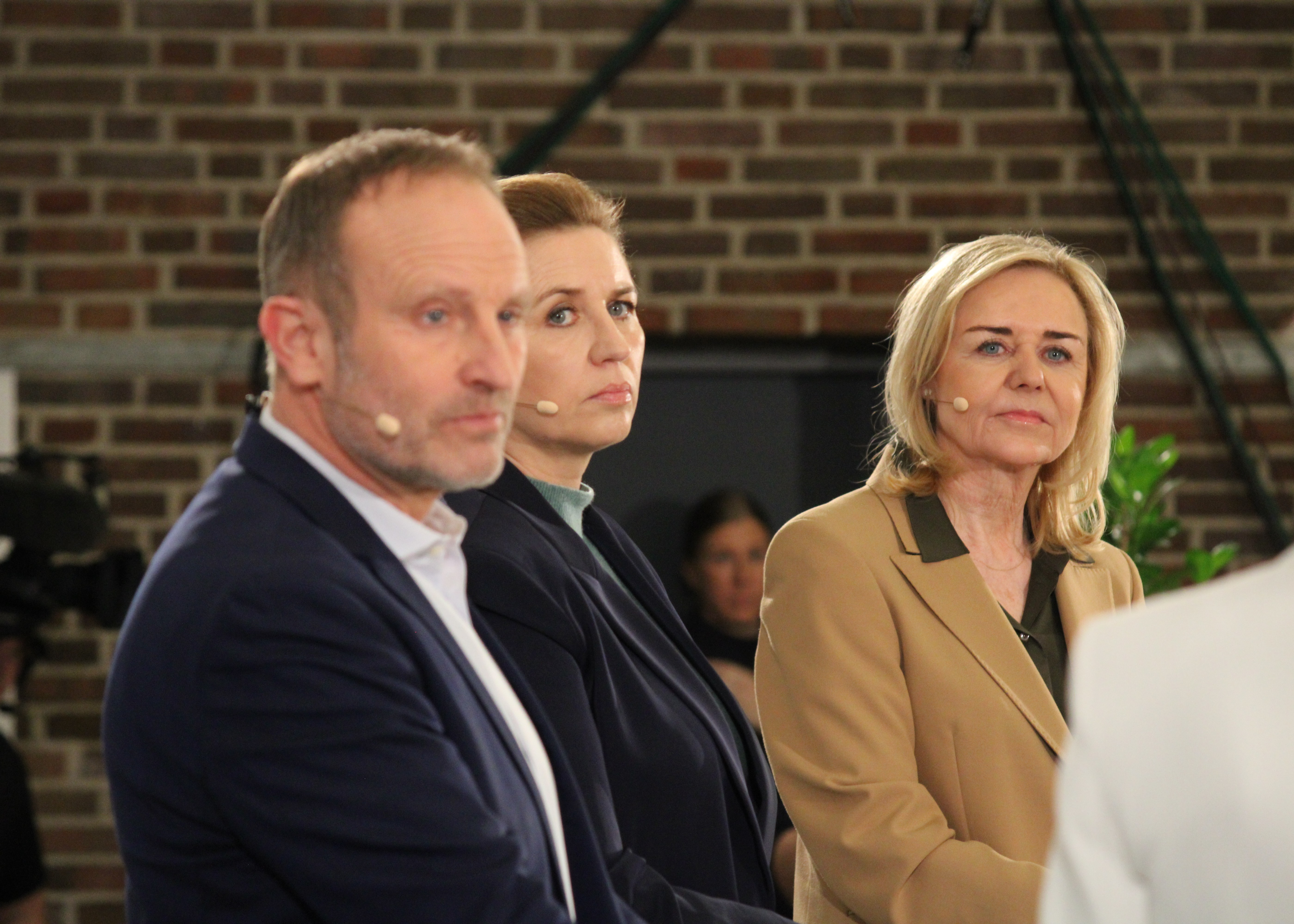
Lidegaard with Mette Frederiksen and Mona Juul at a 2026 debate

Lidegaard has served as a member of the Folketing from 2001 until 2007 and again since the 2015 elections.

On 3 November 2022, one day after former leader Sofie Carsten Nielsen resigned, Lidegaard became leader of the Social Liberal Party. At the press conference announcing this, he reiterated the Social Liberal Party stance of a government with parties from both blocs.

His mother is Danish journalist and author Else Lidegaard. He is also the brother of author, editor and historian Bo Lidegaard.

== Other activities ==
- European Council on Foreign Relations (ECFR), Member of the Council
- Trilateral Commission, Member of the European Group

Political offices
Preceded by Lykke Friis	Minister of Climate, Energy and Building; 2011–2014	Succeeded by Rasmus Helveg Petersen
Preceded by Holger Nielsen	Minister of Foreign Affairs; 2014–2015	Succeeded by Kristian Jensen
