= Ministry of Foreign Affairs (Denmark) =

Government ministry of Denmark

Kingdom of Denmark Ministry of Foreign Affairs
- Udenrigsministeriet

- State Coat of Arms of the Kingdom of Denmark

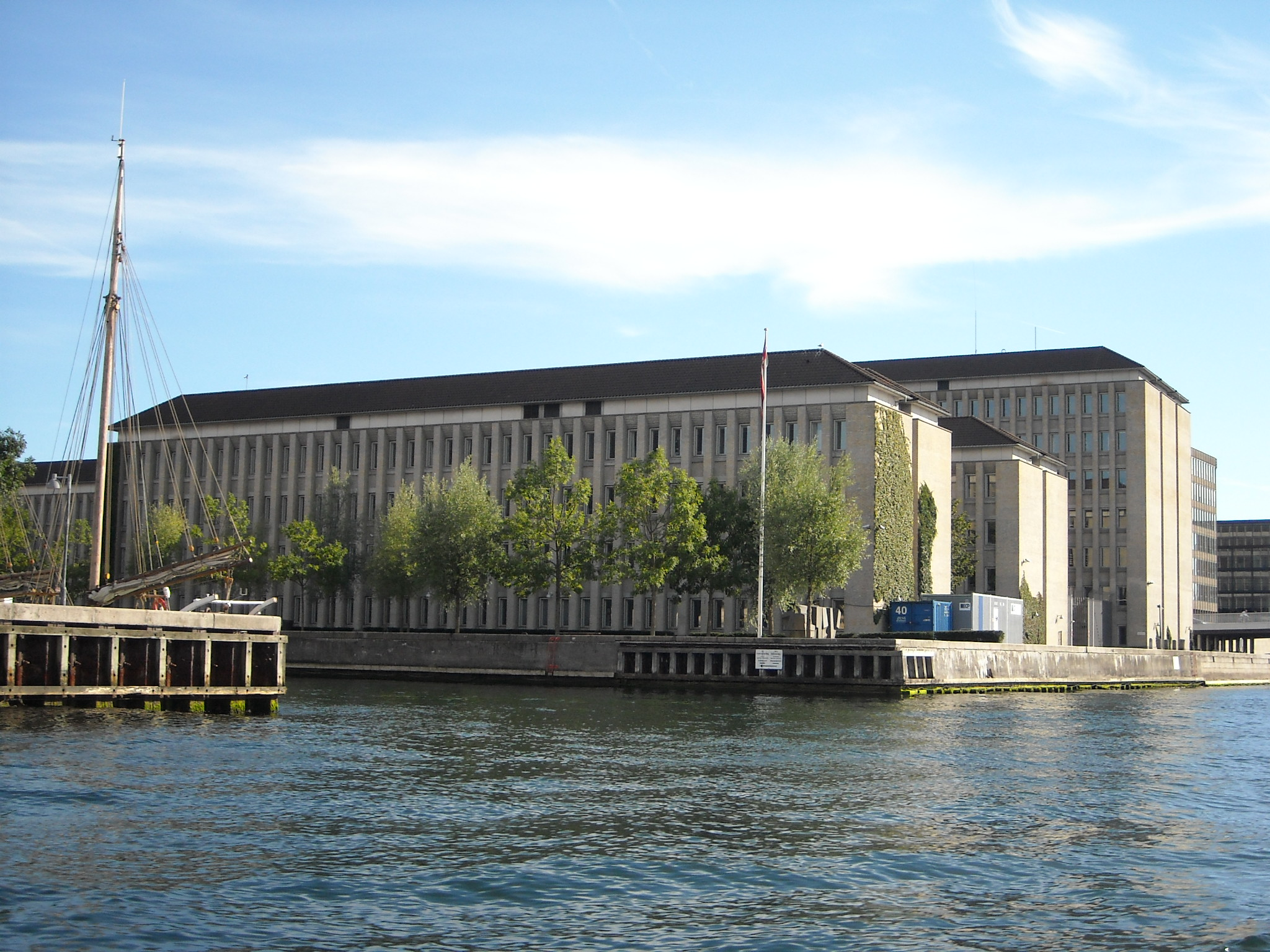
- Ministry of Foreign Affairs of Denmark in Copenhagen

Agency overview
- Formed: 1770
- Jurisdiction: Kingdom of Denmark and its diplomatic missions worldwide
- Headquarters: Copenhagen
- Minister responsible: Lars Løkke Rasmussen, Minister of Foreign Affairs
- Agency executive: Jeppe Tranholm-Mikkelsen, Permanent Secretary
- Website: um.dk

The Ministry of Foreign Affairs of Denmark (Danish: Udenrigsministeriet, Faroese: Uttanríkismálaráðið, Greenlandic: Nunanut Allanut Ministereqarfik) and its overseas representations (the Danish embassies, diplomatic missions, consulates and trade offices) are in charge of the Danish Realm's foreign policy and relations. Among these tasks are policy towards the Arctic Council, European Union, Nordic Council, development aid, trade policy and legal affairs in relation to the outside world.

The ministry services five distinct ministers: the foreign minister, the Minister for Nordic Cooperation, the Minister for Trade, Tourism and Investment, the Minister for European Affairs and the Minister for Development Cooperation. The ministry is led by the head of department and four directors.

== History ==
The Ministry of Foreign Affairs first became its own institution in 1770 as the Foreign Service Department and was renamed The Royal Danish Ministry of Foreign Affairs in 1848. Before then, the diplomatic tasks were usually handled by brief individual missions, but the increasing complexity of diplomatic affairs necessitated the creation of a larger organization. The Ministry currently employs thousands of people at home and abroad.

Its official role is to further Danish interests in a way that furthers the freedom, security and well-being of Danish citizens abroad, while working for peace and stability in the world. In practice, the organization helps Danish companies in their export markets and Danish citizens in emergency situations abroad through close cooperation between the headquarters on Asiatisk Plads in Copenhagen and the representations abroad.

== Involvement in the UN Oil-For-Food Programme ==
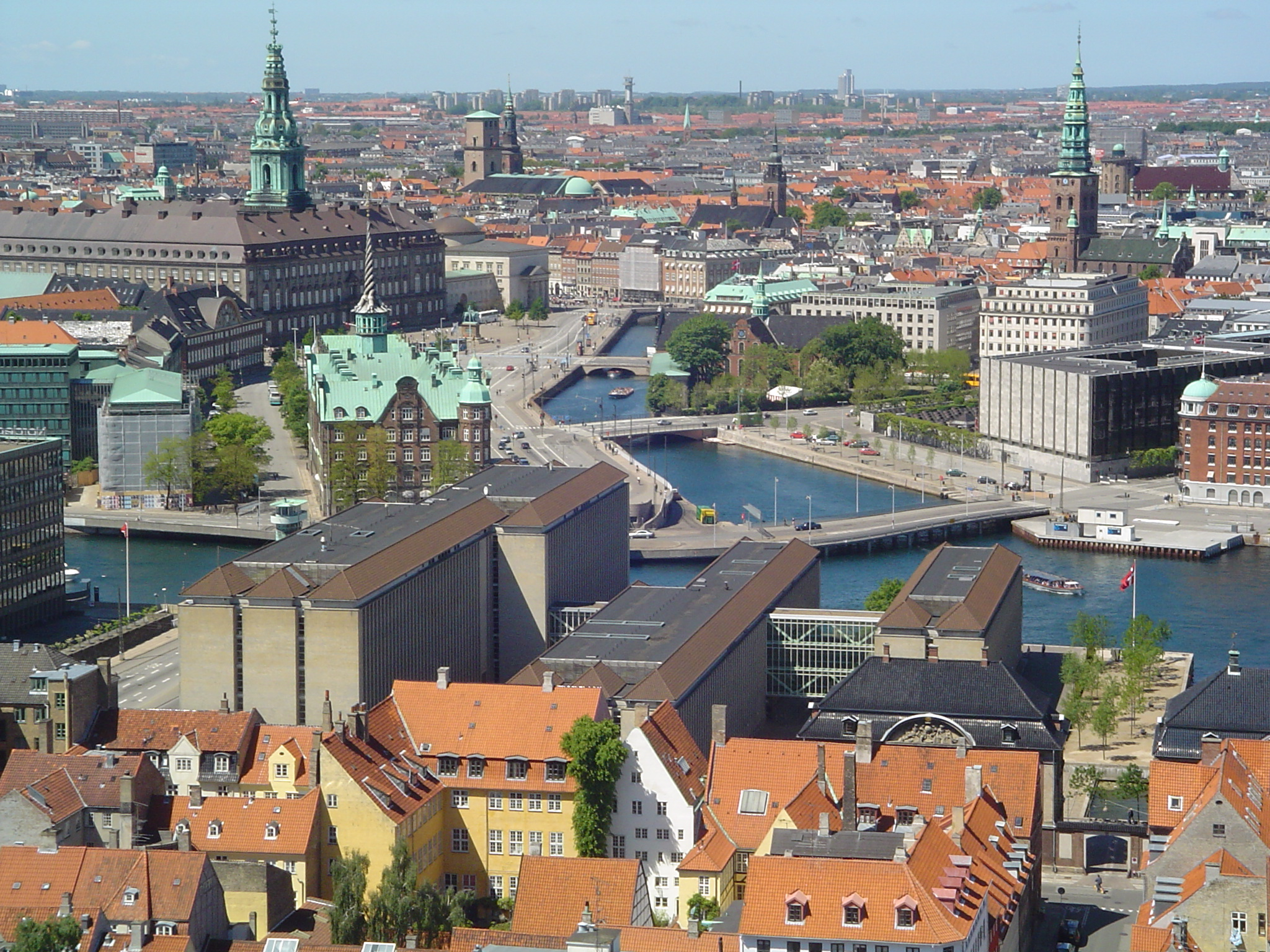
The ministry, as seen from Vor Frelsers Kirke in downtown Copenhagen

Accusations have surfaced that several high-profile Danish companies (including pharmaceutical company Novo) had been bribing various Iraqi government and United Nations officials in connection with the UN Oil-for-Food Programme. According to a UN investigation, more than 2200 companies were involved in the bribery, among these 22 Danish companies, 17 of which are being investigated since 2005 by the State Prosecutor for Serious Economic Crime under the Ministry of Justice.

Some of these companies have since tried to pass on the blame to the Ministry of Foreign Affairs, alleging that they were encouraged by government officials to participate in the widespread corruption. The allegations have held sway in the media and among the liberal-conservative government's opposition in Parliament, who have also criticized the Ministry's unwillingness to comment the case openly. The Ministry of Foreign Affairs has worked together with the State Prosecutor to clarify any issues to absolve itself of blame. In 2007, after several classified documents were leaked to the press, the Ministry decided to release its answers to the questions posed by the State Prosecutor in an effort to protect its employees.

== Danish Trade Council ==
The Danish Trade Council is a trade organisation within the Ministry of Foreign Affairs that promotes Danish exports and investment abroad.

== See also ==
- Danish diplomatic missions
- List of ambassadors of Denmark
- UN City
