= Denmark and the European Union =

Denmark–European Union relations
- Denmark: European Union

Denmark in the European Union refers to the historical and current issues of Denmark's membership in the European Union (EU). Denmark has a permanent representation to the EU in Brussels. Although the Kingdom is a member of the EU as a whole, the EU jurisdiction is specifically exempt from the Danish autonomous territories of the Faroe Islands and Greenland.

The main economic reason that Denmark joined the European Communities was because it wanted to safeguard its agricultural exports to the United Kingdom.

== History ==
Denmark formally applied to join the European Communities, the predecessor of the European Union, on 10 August 1961, a day after the British applied. However, the then President of France Charles de Gaulle vetoed British membership, and Denmark did not wish to join the EC without the United Kingdom. After much negotiation, and following a change in the French presidency, Denmark, Ireland and the United Kingdom eventually joined the European Communities on 1 January 1973. Denmark and Ireland were so economically linked to the UK that they considered it necessary to join the EC if the UK joined it. The Danish population voted for membership, 63.3% being in favour, with a turnout of 90.1%. This was the first of several enlargements which became a major policy area of the Communities. In 1982, Greenland voted to leave the Communities after gaining home rule from Denmark.

Accession of Denmark in EC 1973

The EC became accepted and appreciated in Denmark, and an overwhelming majority of the Danish population supported the Single European Act in 1986.

Danes spurred political awareness of euroscepticism and have had a reputation as "reluctant" Europeans. The first Danish Maastricht Treaty referendum in Denmark was held on 2 June 1992, but a shortfall of fewer than 50,000 votes resulted in the treaty not being ratified. After the failure, alterations were made to the treaty through the Edinburgh Agreement which granted Denmark four opt-outs from EU legislation. The treaty was eventually ratified the following year on 18 May 1993, after a second referendum was held in Denmark.

The Treaty of Lisbon was ratified by the Danish parliament alone. It was not considered a surrendering of national sovereignty, which would have implied the holding of a referendum according to article 20 of the constitution.

In October 2012, Prime Minister Helle Thorning-Schmidt demanded a 1 billion kroner rebate in the Budget of the European Union, otherwise she would veto the budget. In February 2013, Denmark and the European Union reached an agreement on a seven-year budget, to approve the Danish demand.

On 25 May 2014, the Danish Unified Patent Court membership referendum was approved with 62.5% of the vote, enabling the government to proceed with the ratification of the Agreement on a Unified Patent Court, which constitutes the legal basis for the Unified Patent Court.

In 2009 the Danish government sought to adjust its opt-outs in several policy areas by referendum, with the aim of deepening the congruence of Danish policies with those of the EU. (Note: This article incorporates public domain material from U.S. Bilateral Relations Fact Sheets. United States Department of State.) This eventually resulted in the referendum on the home and justice affairs opt-out that took place on 3 December 2015, with the electorate turning down the proposed change to the full opt-out.

== Euroscepticism ==
Three political parties in the Danish parliament call themselves eurosceptic: the Danish People's Party, the Red-Green Alliance, and the New Right. Over the years, many anti-EU organisations have been established, for example People's Movement against the EU and the June Movement.

In July 2011, Denmark reinforced its borders with Germany by stationing more officers, in an effort to halt the flow of illegal goods. The action angered both Germany and Sweden. Minister of Europe Joerg-Uwe Hahn in the state of Hesse called for a boycott of Denmark by tourists. He said: "If Denmark is introducing border controls again during the holiday season, I can only suggest that people turn right around and holiday in Austria or Poland instead." The European Commission warned Denmark not to breach the Schengen Treaty.

In January 2019, a poll suggested that 8% of the population want to leave the EU.

== Euro ==
Denmark uses the krone as its currency and does not use the euro, having negotiated an opt-out from participation under the Edinburgh Agreement in 1992. In 2000, the government held a referendum on introducing the euro, which was defeated with 46.8% voting yes and 53.2% voting no. The Danish krone is part of the ERM-II mechanism, so its exchange rate is tied to within 2.25% of the euro.

Most of the large political parties in Denmark favour the introduction of the euro, and the idea of a second referendum has been suggested several times since 2000. However, some parties such as the Danish People's Party and Socialist People's Party do not currently support a referendum. Public opinion surveys have shown fluctuating support for the single currency. Majorities were in favour for some years after the physical introduction of the currency; however, support began to fall following the 2008 financial crisis, and in late 2011, support for the euro crashed in light of the escalating Euro area crisis.

== Denmark's foreign relations with EU member states ==
- Austria
- Belgium
- Bulgaria
- Croatia
- Cyprus
- Czech Republic
- Estonia
- Finland
- France
- Germany
- Greece
- Hungary
- (Republic of Ireland) Ireland
- Italy
- Latvia
- Lithuania
- Luxembourg
- Malta
- Netherlands
- Poland
- Portugal
- Romania
- Slovakia
- Slovenia
- Spain
- Sweden

== See also ==
- Denmark and the euro
- Danish European Constitution referendum
- Faroe Islands and the European Union
- Greenland and the European Union
