= Rydal =

Rydal may refer to:

== Places ==
Europe

- Rydal, Cumbria, a hamlet in the Lake District of England
  - Rydal Mount, William Wordsworth's house in the Lake District
  - Rydal Water, the lake upon which it is situated
- Rydal Penrhos, a private school in North Wales (formerly known as Rydal)
- Rydal, Sweden, a village in Mark Municipality, Sweden

United States

- Rydal, Georgia
- Rydal, Kansas
- Rydal, Pennsylvania, a Railway Station and suburb of Philadelphia

Australia

- Rydal, New South Wales
- Rydalmere, New South Wales, a suburb in Sydney
  - Rydalmere railway station, in the above suburb

== See also ==
- Rydahl (surname)
