= Rypdal =

Rypdal is a surname. Notable people with the surname include:

- Arild Rypdal (1934–2015), Norwegian author, pilot and engineer
- Inger Lise Rypdal (born 1949), Norwegian singer and actress
- Isak Rypdal, Norwegian music producer and founder of Crab Key Records
- Jakob Rypdal (1926–2015), Norwegian triple jumper
- Jakob Terjesønn Rypdal (born 1989), Norwegian Electronica artist and guitarist
- Peter L. Rypdal (1909–1988), Norwegian fiddler and famous traditional folk music composer
- Terje Rypdal (born 1947), Norwegian guitarist and composer

== See also ==
- Rydal (disambiguation)
