= Denmark–Spain relations =

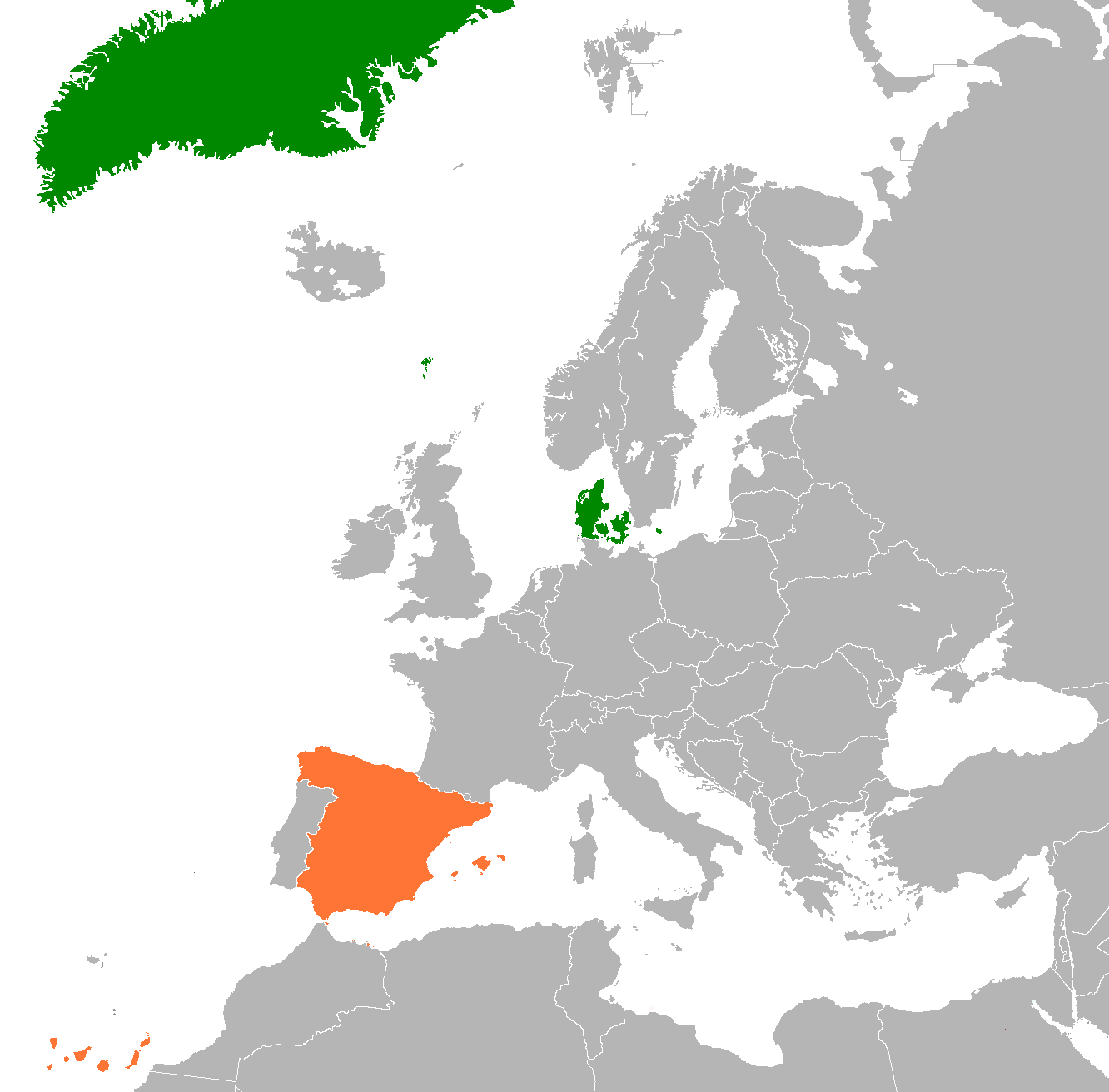
- Denmark: Spain

Denmark–Spain relations are foreign relations between Denmark and Spain. Relations between Spain and Denmark are determined largely by the membership of both countries to the EU and NATO. Denmark has an embassy in Madrid. Spain has an embassy in Copenhagen.

== Trade ==
Spain is Denmark's 9th largest export country. In 2009, the export to Spain was more than 13 billion DKK. Danish export to Spain includes medicine, industrial machinery and furnitures.

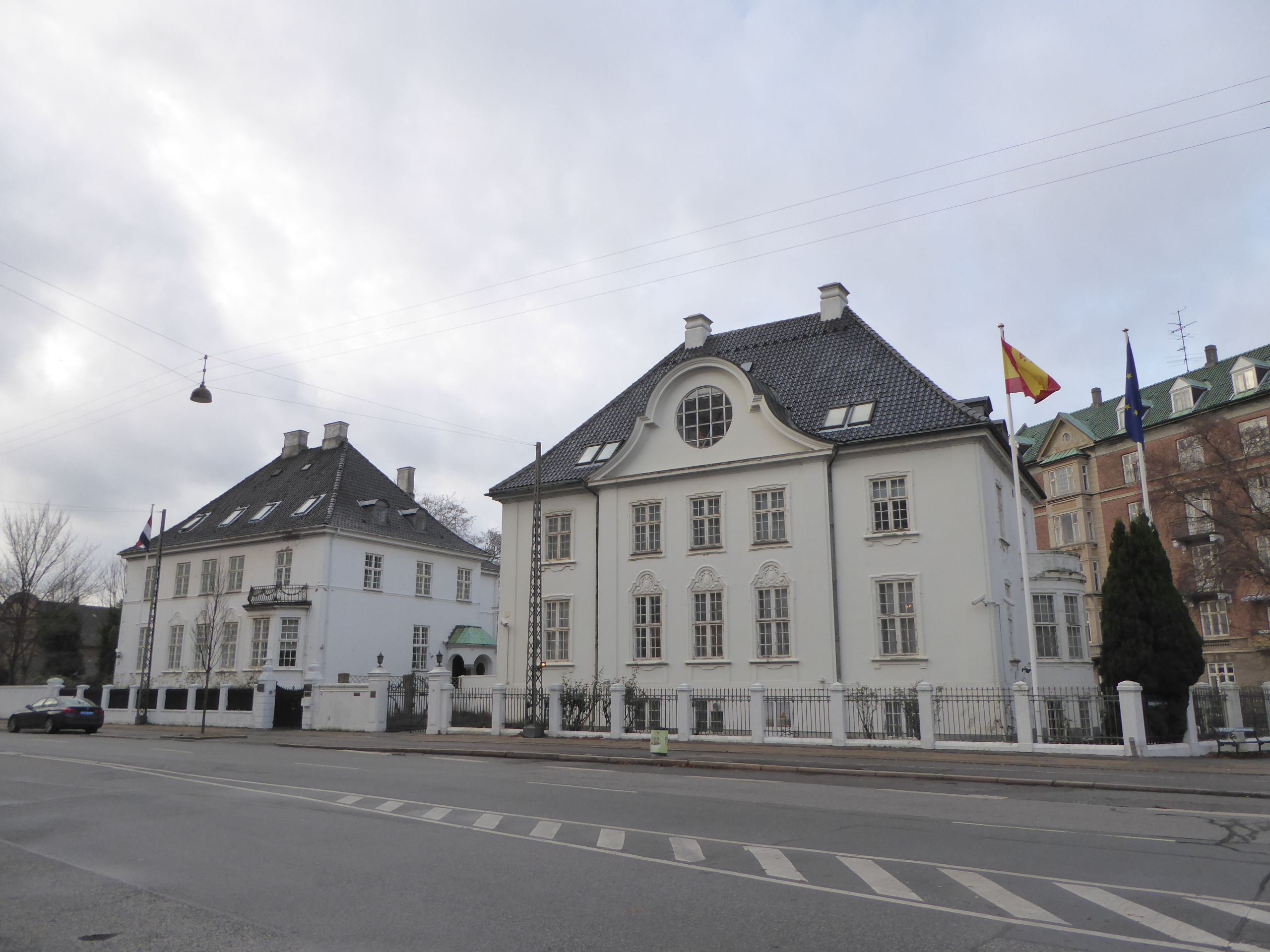
Embassy of Spain in Copenhagen

== See also ==
- Foreign relations of Denmark
- Foreign relations of Spain
- Denmark and the European Union
