= Rydahl =

Rydahl is a surname. Notable people with the surname include:

- Gustav Rydahl (born 1994), Swedish professional ice hockey centre
- Malene Rydahl (born 1974), Danish writer, speaker, and executive coach
- Julie Rydahl Bukh (born 1982), Danish former football midfielder

== See also ==
- Rydal
