= Denmark–France relations =

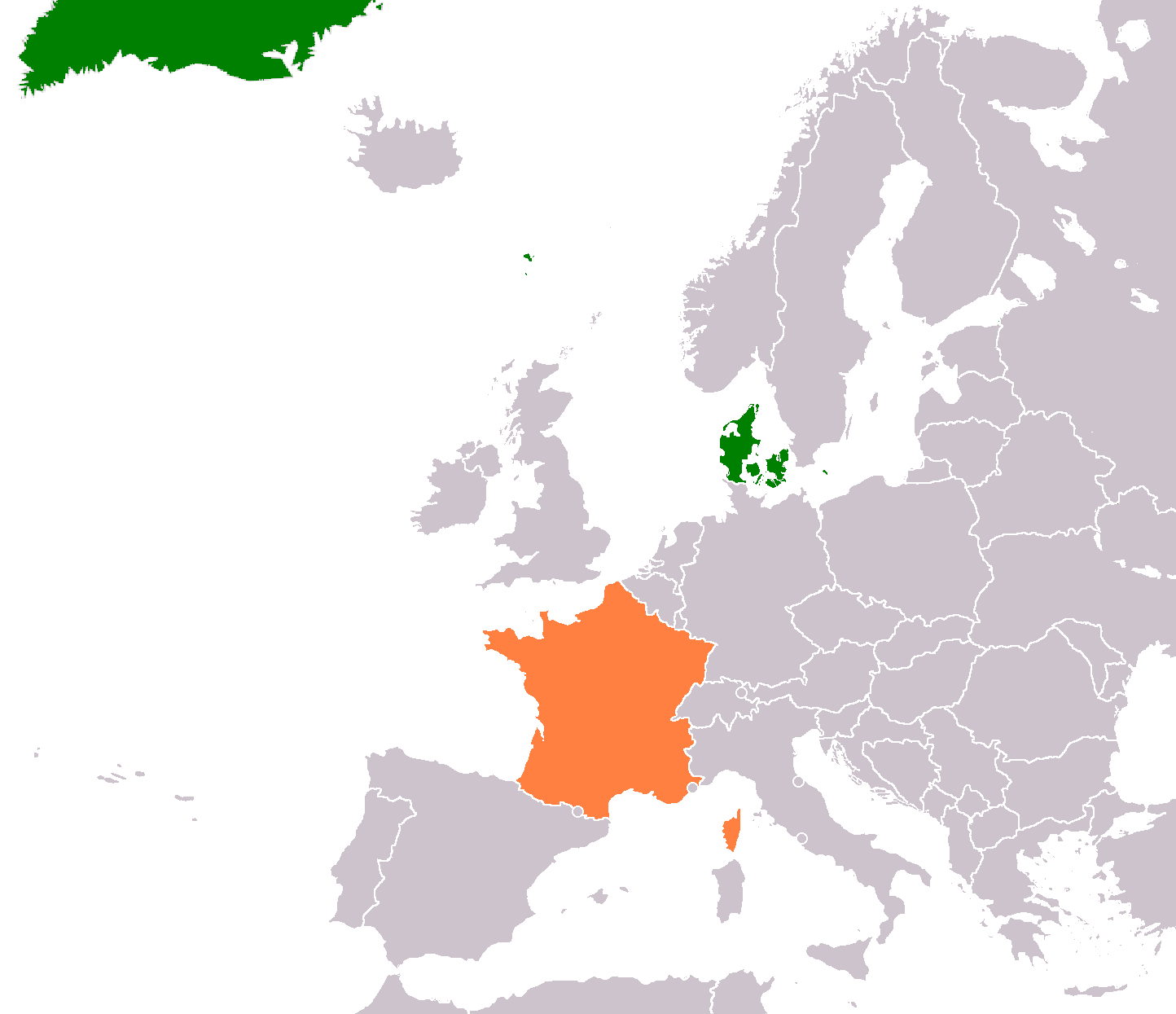
- Denmark: France

Denmark and France have shared current and historical relations. Denmark has an embassy in Paris and France has an embassy in Copenhagen. Both countries are full members of the Council of Europe, the European Union and NATO.

== History ==
The relations between Denmark and France date back to the Dark Ages, when Danish Vikings pillaged the Northern part of the country, including Paris which Ragnar Lodbrok and his army sacked in the 845. Paris was again attacked in 885 and 886 by Vikings. They settled Northern France, becoming the Normans, who conquered England in 1066. When Scandinavia Christianized, French monks lived in Denmark, and Danish students in Paris. In the 17th century, there were many Danish students in medicine, law, philosophy and theology in France, while in Denmark there were many French tutors.

Ingeborg, daughter of Valdemar I of Denmark, was queen consort of France (1193 & 1200–1223).

In 1570, France, along with Poland and the Holy Roman Empire, helped conclude the peace between Denmark and Sweden at Szczecin ending the Northern Seven Years' War in 1570.

=== Scanian War ===
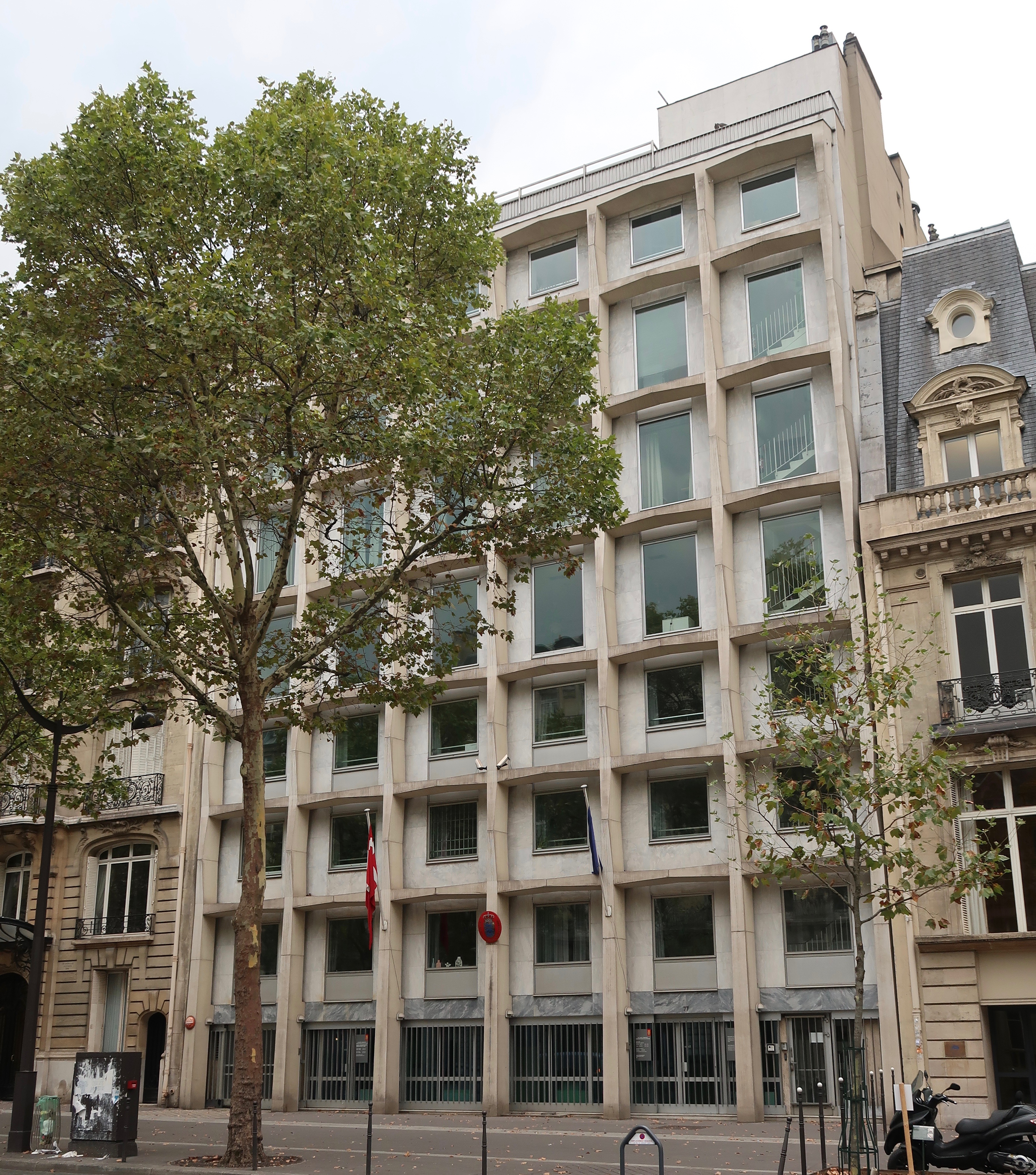
Embassy of Denmark in Paris

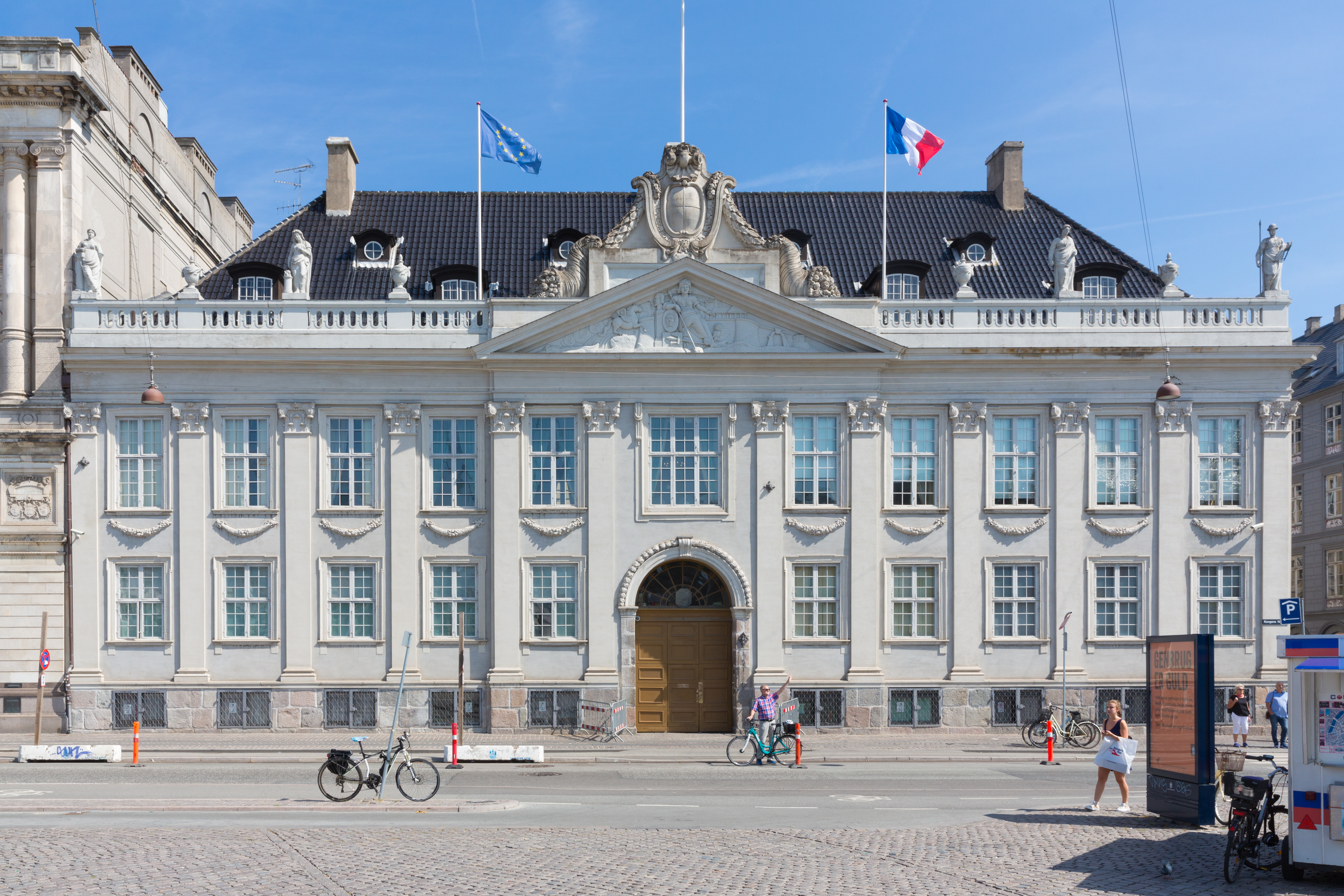
Embassy of France in Copenhagen

The Scanian War (1675–1679) was a part of the Northern Wars involving the union of Denmark–Norway, Brandenburg and Sweden. It was fought mainly on Scanian soil, in the former Danish provinces along the border with Sweden and in Northern Germany. While the latter battles are regarded a theater of the Scanian war in English, Danish and Swedish historiography, they are seen as a separate war in German historiography, called the Swedish-Brandenburgian War.

The war was prompted by the Swedish involvement in the Franco-Dutch War. Sweden had allied with France against several European countries. The United Provinces, under attack by France, sought support from Denmark–Norway. After some hesitation, King Christian V started the invasion of the Scania (Skåneland) in 1675, while the Swedish were occupied with a war against Brandenburg. The invasion of Scania was combined with a simultaneous Norwegian front called the Gyldenløve War, forcing the defending Swedes to fight a two-front war in addition to their entanglements in the Holy Roman Empire.

The Danish objective was to retrieve the Scanian lands that had been ceded to Sweden in the Treaty of Roskilde, after the Northern Wars. Although the Danish offensive was initially a great success, Swedish counter-offensives led by the 19-year-old Charles XI of Sweden nullified much of the gain.

It was a war with no definite victor; the Swedish navy lost at sea, the Danish army was defeated in Scania by the Swedes, who in turn were defeated in Northern Germany by the Brandenburgers. The war and the hostilities ended when Denmark's ally the United Provinces settled with Sweden's stronger ally France and the Swedish king Charles XI married Danish princess Ulrike Eleonora, sister of Christian V. Peace was made on behalf of France with the treaties of Fontainebleau and Lund and Saint Germain, restoring most of the lost territories to Sweden.

=== War of the Sixth Coalition ===
In the War of the Sixth Coalition (1812–1814), a coalition of Austria, Prussia, Russia, Spain, Sweden, the United Kingdom, and a number of German States finally defeated France and drove Napoleon Bonaparte into exile on Elba. After Napoleon's disastrous invasion of Russia, the continental powers joined Russia, Britain, Portugal and the rebels in Spain. With their armies reorganized along more Napoleonic lines, they drove Napoleon out of Germany in 1813 and invaded France in 1814, forcing Napoleon to abdicate and restoring the Bourbons.

=== 21st century ===
The last French state visit to Denmark took place in August 2018 (the previous one dated back to 1982). President Emmanuel Macron met with his counterpart Lars Løkke Rasmussen as well as the royal family and numerous figures from the Danish political scene. The main issues discussed were security, Europe, and climate change. Meetings also focused on gender equality and empathy. The French delegation included business leaders such as TotalEnergies's CEO Patrick Pouyanné, Ponant cruise line president Jean-Emmanuel Sauvée, and Danish-French speaker and coach Malene Rydahl.

The most recent Danish state visit to France was in April 2025, when King Frederik X of Denmark and Queen Mary of Denmark travelled to France. This visit led to the conclusion of a new bilateral strategic partnership covering, among other areas, health, defense, ecological and energy transition, culture, and heritage.

== Economic relations ==
French exports to Denmark were €2.19 billion in 2009. Imports from Denmark were 2.35 billion euros in 2009.

== Resident diplomatic missions ==
- Denmark has an embassy in Paris.
- France has an embassy in Copenhagen.

== See also ==
- Foreign relations of Denmark
- Foreign relations of France
- Danish House in Paris
