= Denmark–Finland relations =

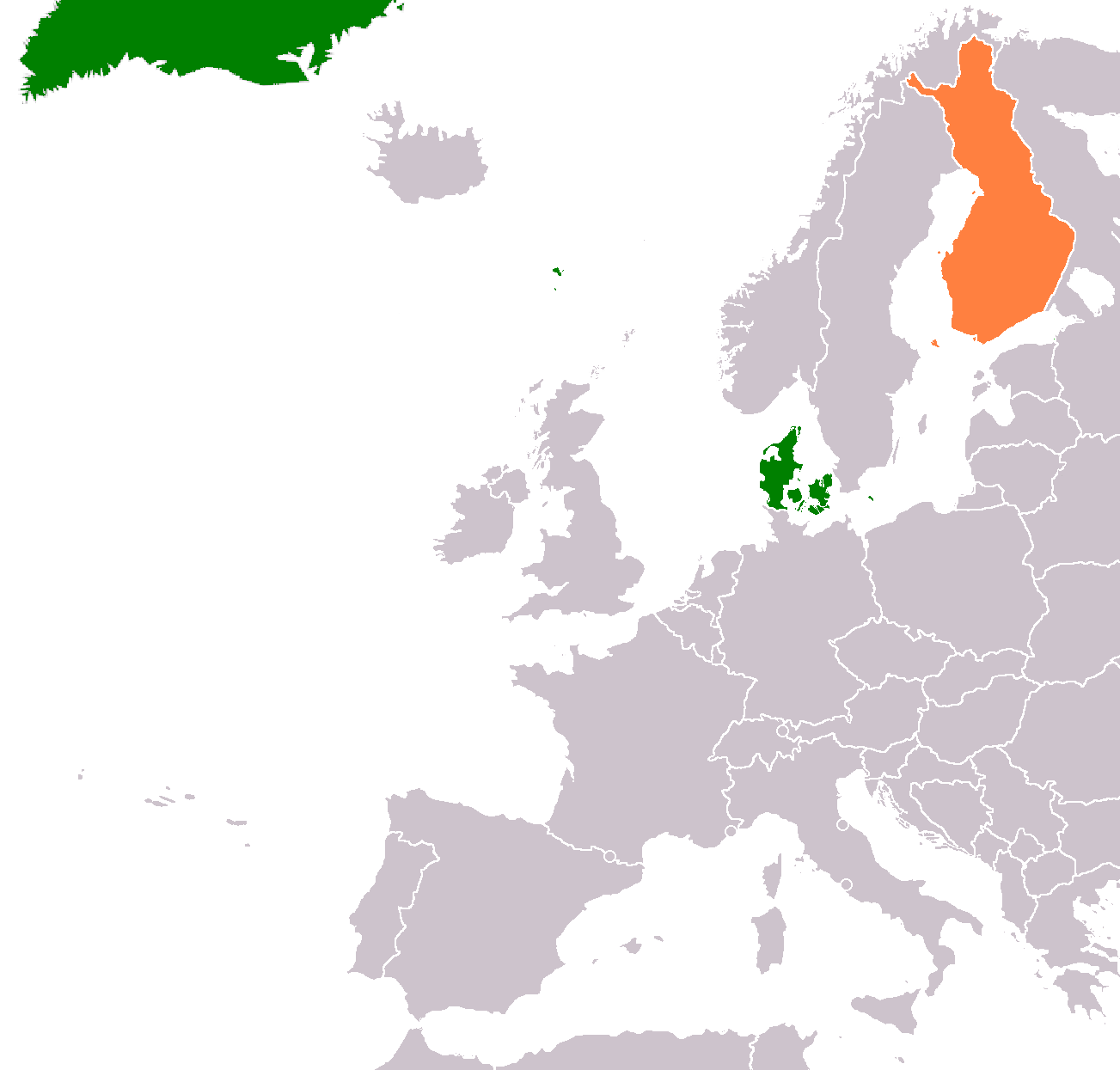
- Denmark: Finland

Diplomatic mission
- Embassy of Denmark, Helsinki: Embassy of Finland, Copenhagen

Denmark recognized Finland on 10 January 1918 and the two countries established diplomatic relations on 18 February 1918. Denmark has an embassy in Helsinki, while Finland has an embassy in Copenhagen. Both countries are members of the European Union, Nordic Council, Council of the Baltic Sea States, Joint Expeditionary Force, and NATO.

Denmark and Finland, though geographically distant, have maintained contact since medieval times, with the Baltic Sea acting as a connector. Danish cultural and economic influences have shaped Finland, reflecting broader Nordic ties.

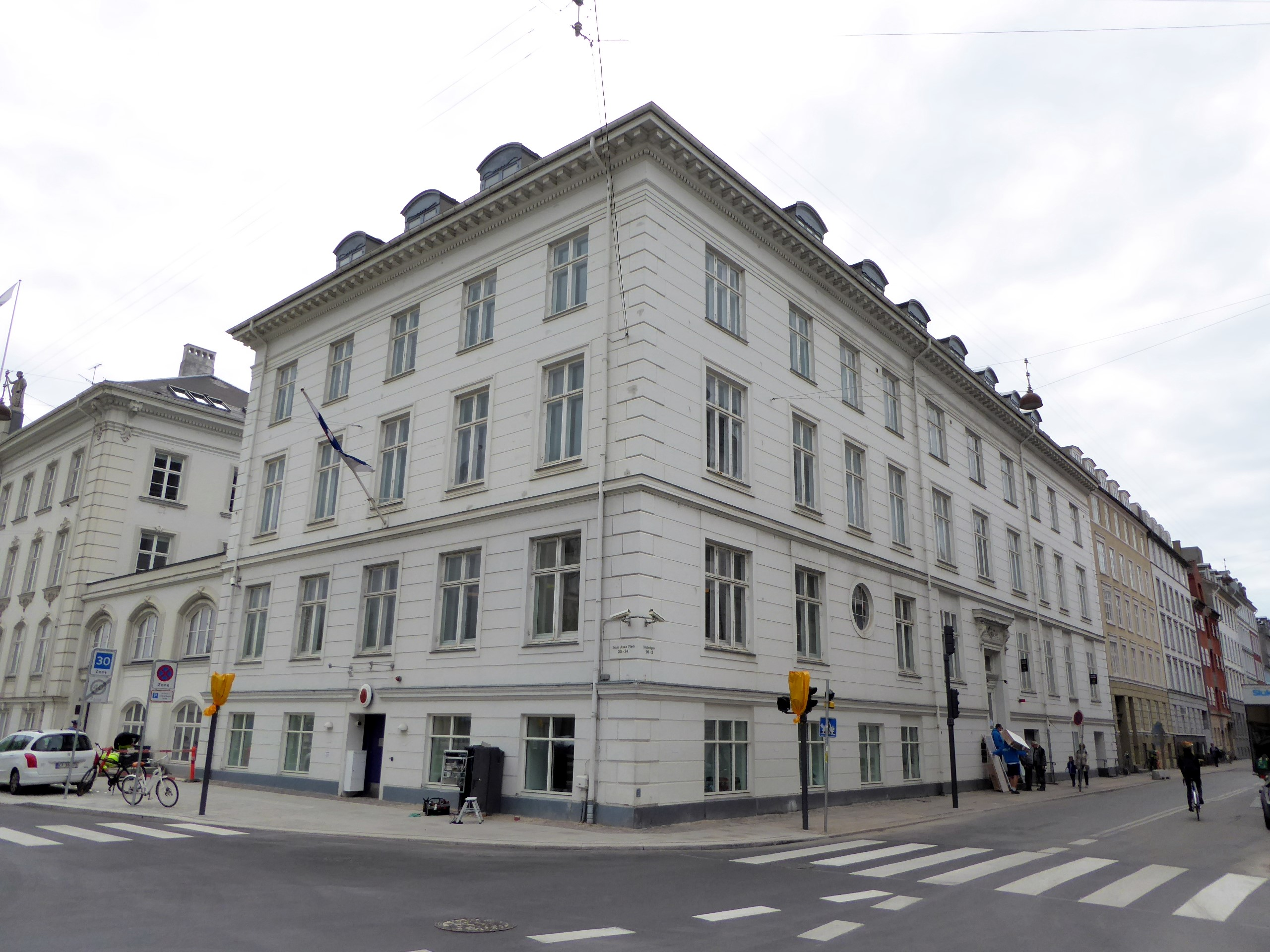
Finnish embassy in Copenhagen

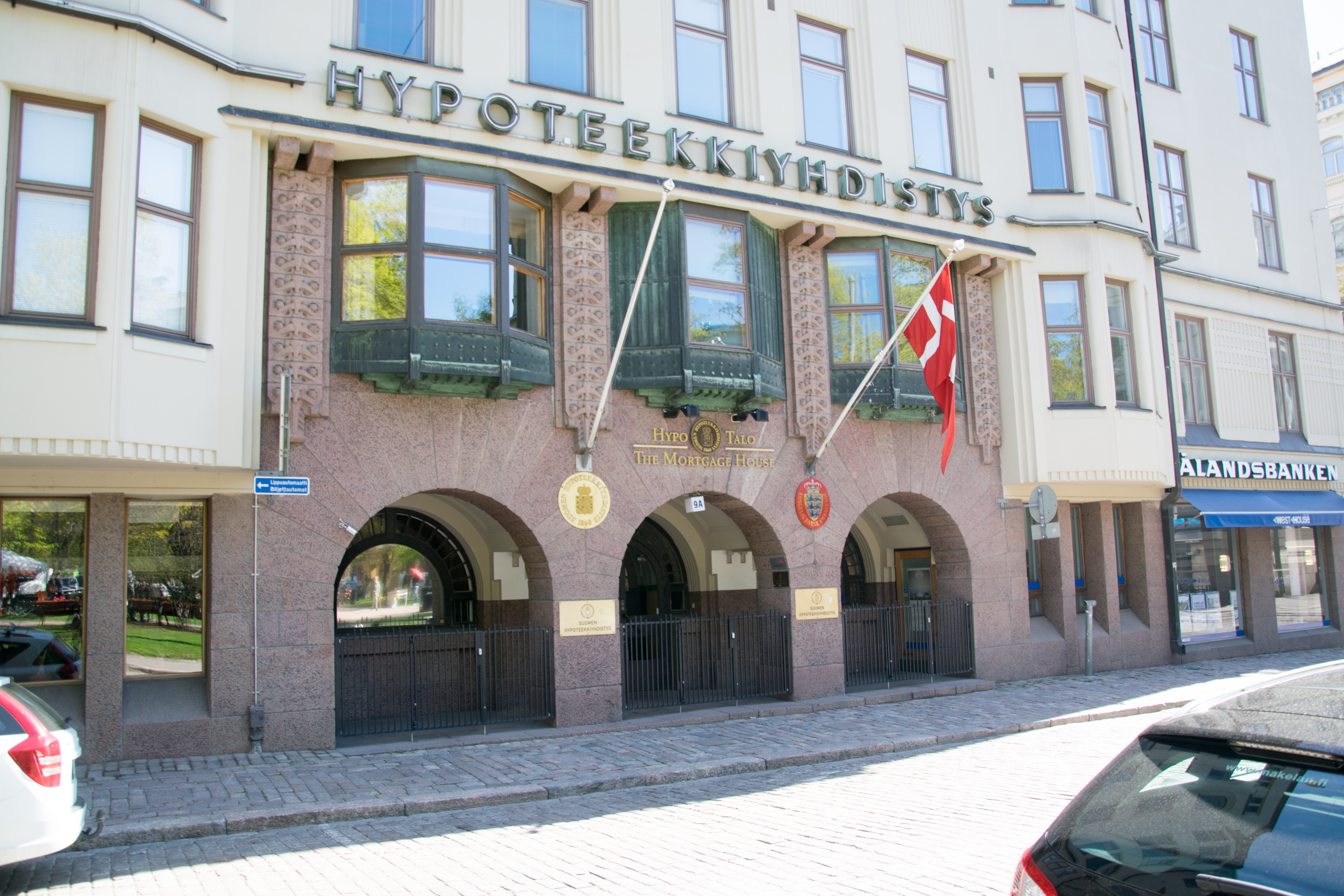
Danish embassy in Helsinki

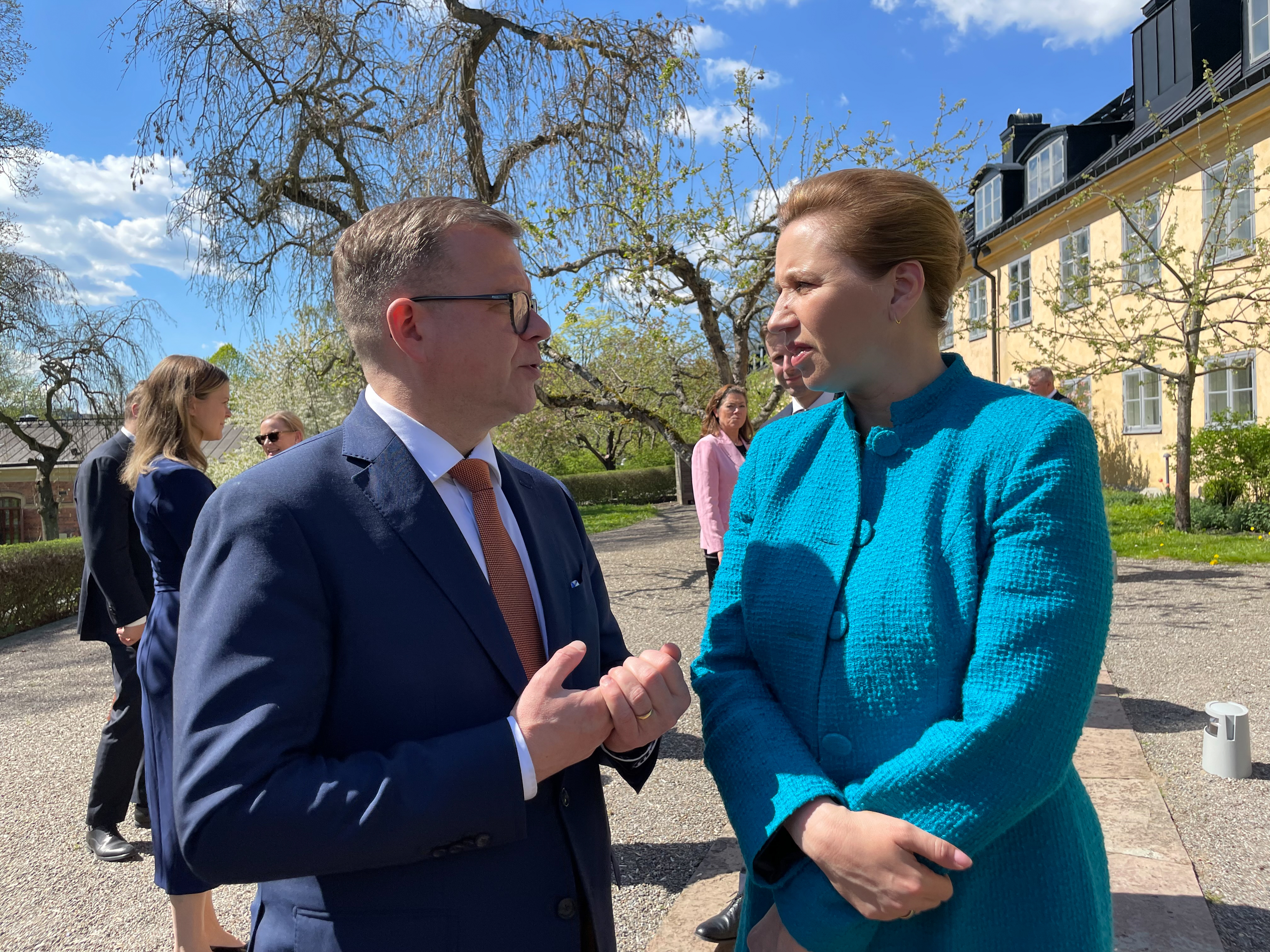
Finnish Prime Minister Petteri Orpo and Danish Prime Minister Mette Frederiksen in Stockholm, May 2024

== History ==
=== Early relations (1200-1700) ===
The earliest documented connections between Denmark and Finland date back to the era of the expeditions of Valdemar II of Denmark to the northeastern Baltic, during which the Danes conquered Estonia. These voyages, following the sheltered coasts of Sweden and Finland, also led to landings in Finland. Danish chronicles even claim that Denmark conquered parts of Finland by force. Records from these chronicles, along with the renowned sailing route from Denmark to Estonia described in the cadastre of King Valdemar, believed to have been written by Bishop Torkel in Reval in the 1240s, provide insight into these early Danish crusades and maritime routes through Finland. During the High Middle Ages, Danish influence extended as far as Finland. A notable example is a depiction of the Danish royal saint, Saint Canute, which stood in the parish church of Sääksmäki and is believed to have been carved around 1400, though this appears to have been an isolated case. The presence of a copy of the Missale Hafniense, reconstructed from parchment fragments once used as bindings for Finnish account books in the 16th century, also hints at ecclesiastical connections. These fragments, originally part of medieval Danish liturgical texts, were transferred to Finland from the Chamber Archives in Stockholm in 1810 and removed from the account books in the 1840s. The Kalmar Union brought Denmark and Finland into closer contact, as several Danish nobles became active in the Swedish-controlled parts of Finland, with some, like Erik Axelsson Tott, playing key roles there. Tott served as governor in Eastern Finland near the border with the emerging Grand Principality of Moscow and, in 1475, began constructing the border fortress of Olavinlinna. During the conflicts surrounding the dissolution of the union, Danish military actions also reached Finland. In 1509, Otte Rud led a raid that included the plundering of Turku and the theft of the chalice of its cathedral. Due to the strained relations between Denmark and Sweden during the 1600s, this period did not see any significant connections between Denmark and Finland. However, in the early 1700s, the wars that led to the downfall of the Swedish empire dramatically shifted the balance of power in the region, which in turn captured the attention of Denmark. With the rise of the Russian Empire under Peter the Great, Denmark became increasingly concerned about the developments in Finland. Between 1714 and 1716, pamphlets were widely distributed in Denmark, depicting the pivotal stages of the conquest of Finland by Russia, including key battles such as the ones at Pälkäne and Isokyrö, the fall of Olavinlinna and Kajaani Castle, as well as the occupation of Åland. Along with these pamphlets, a sketch map of the Battle of Storkyro in Ostrobothnia was also presented, illustrating the extent of the military advances of Russia.

=== Relations in the 20th century ===
Following the Finnish declaration of independence in 1917, a delegation consisting of Juho Kusti Paasikivi and Adolf Törngren was sent to the Scandinavian countries, including Denmark. Paasikivi, later to become president after World War II, and Torngren, who had extensive knowledge of Russian affairs, were tasked with delivering the confidential news about the independence of their country. In Denmark, they negotiated with Foreign Minister Scavenius. Denmark reacted strongly when the Soviet Union engaged in the Winter War against Finland in 1939. Approximately 1,000 Danish volunteers joined the Finnish army, forming an independent battalion, while others served in various units. Two Danish pilots, Lieutenants Erhard Frijs and Carl Knut Kalmberg, lost their lives during the conflict. However, by 1941, the political situation had shifted, and Danish volunteer participation had diminished. Moreover, despite its own challenges, Denmark provided significant humanitarian assistance and thousands of Danish households welcomed Finnish children, offering them refuge during the war.

In the 1970s and 1980s, economic relations saw significant growth, with exports both ways increasing tenfold. By 1987, Denmark had become the seventh-largest export partner of Finland. Finnish exports diversified, adding machinery, fuel, chemicals, and raw materials to traditional products like timber, paper, and cellulose. The entry of Denmark into the European Economic Community in 1973 further strengthened these ties, positioning Denmark as a gateway to the internal market of the community.
