= Denmark–Hungary relations =

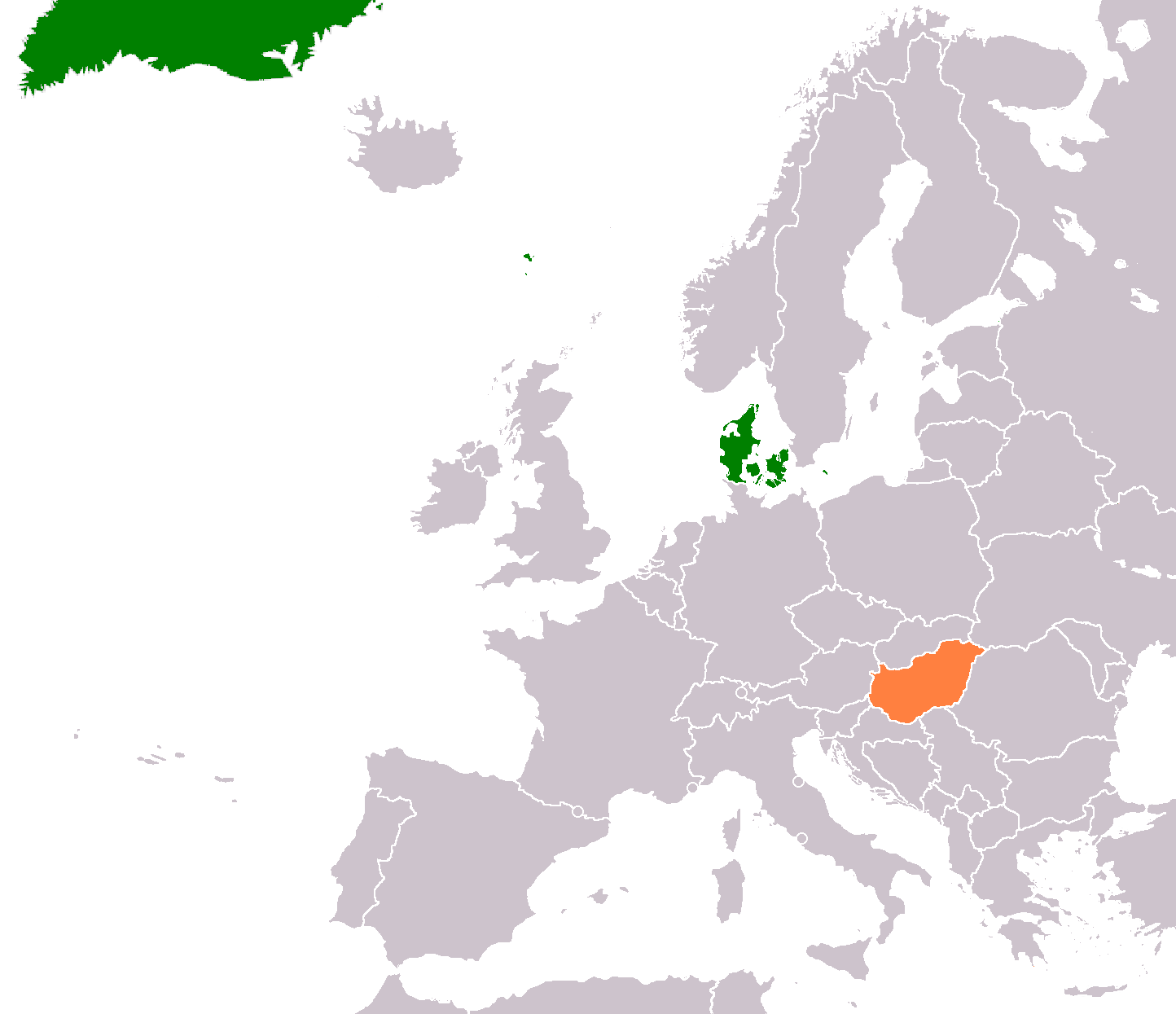

- Denmark: Hungary

Diplomatic mission
- Embassy of Denmark, Budapest: Embassy of Hungary, Copenhagen

Denmark–Hungary relations refers to the current and historical relations between Denmark and Hungary. Denmark has an embassy in Budapest. Hungary has an embassy in Copenhagen. Diplomatic relations were established on 10 May 1948. Both countries are full members of the Council of Europe, the European Union and NATO.

== History ==
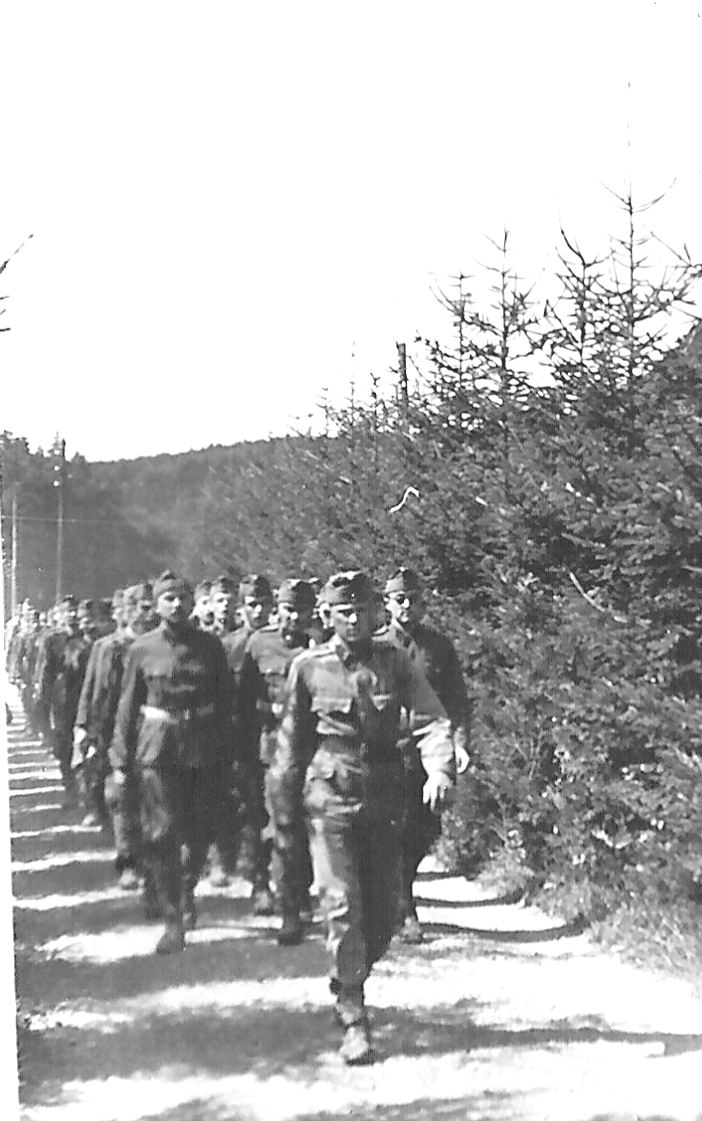
Hungarian soldiers in Denmark, April 1945.

During the Rákóczi's War of Independence, Denmark supported the Habsburg Empire with troops, which fought against the Hungarians (Kurucs) and helped the Austrians achieve several important victories.

In World War II, Hungary sent 12.000 soldiers to Denmark, through Germany. After the Hungarian Revolution of 1956, 1,400 Hungarians fled to Denmark. 137 million DKK were collected to help the Hungarians. In 1948, a payments agreement was signed between both countries. On 20 October 1969, Denmark and Hungary signed an agreement on economic, industrial, and technical cooperation. An agreement on compensation for Danish interests in Hungary was signed on 18 June 1965.

The Greenland crisis is a sensitive point in the Denmark-Hungary relations, as opinions suggest that Hungarian Prime Minister Viktor Orbán and his government supports the territorial claims of the US President Donald Trump, who is demanding the transfer of Greenland from Denmark.

== Cooperation and investment ==
Denmark, in bilateral cooperation, is helping Hungary with agriculture, education, and health. Coloplast, Lego and A. P. Moller-Maersk Group are some of the Danish investors in Hungary.

== Culture ==
More than 200 Danish artists participated in the Budapest Spring Festival 2010, which started 5 April.

== Paul Bang-Jensen ==
Povl Bang-Jensen was a Danish diplomat, later a civil service in UN. In 1956 he questioned 80 Hungarian refugees in New York City who had fled Hungary. When UN Secretary General Dag Hammarskjöld demanded the names of the refugees, Jensen refused to do so in fear that it would come in communist security services. Ultimately, Jensen burned the list of names. Jensen is very well known in Hungary.

== High level visits ==
In 1987, Margrethe II of Denmark visited Hungary. Former Prime Minister of Hungary, Ferenc Gyurcsány visited Denmark on 12 June 2007. On 19 March 2010, Crown Prince Frederik and Per Stig Møller visited Budapest Spring Festival.

== The European Union and NATO ==
Denmark became a member of the European Union in 1973, while Hungary joined in 2004. Denmark is a founding member of NATO, whereas Hungary became a member in 1999.

== Resident diplomatic missions ==
- Denmark has an embassy in Budapest.
- Hungary has an embassy in Copenhagen.

== See also ==
- Foreign relations of Denmark
- Foreign relations of Hungary
