= Denmark–Netherlands relations =

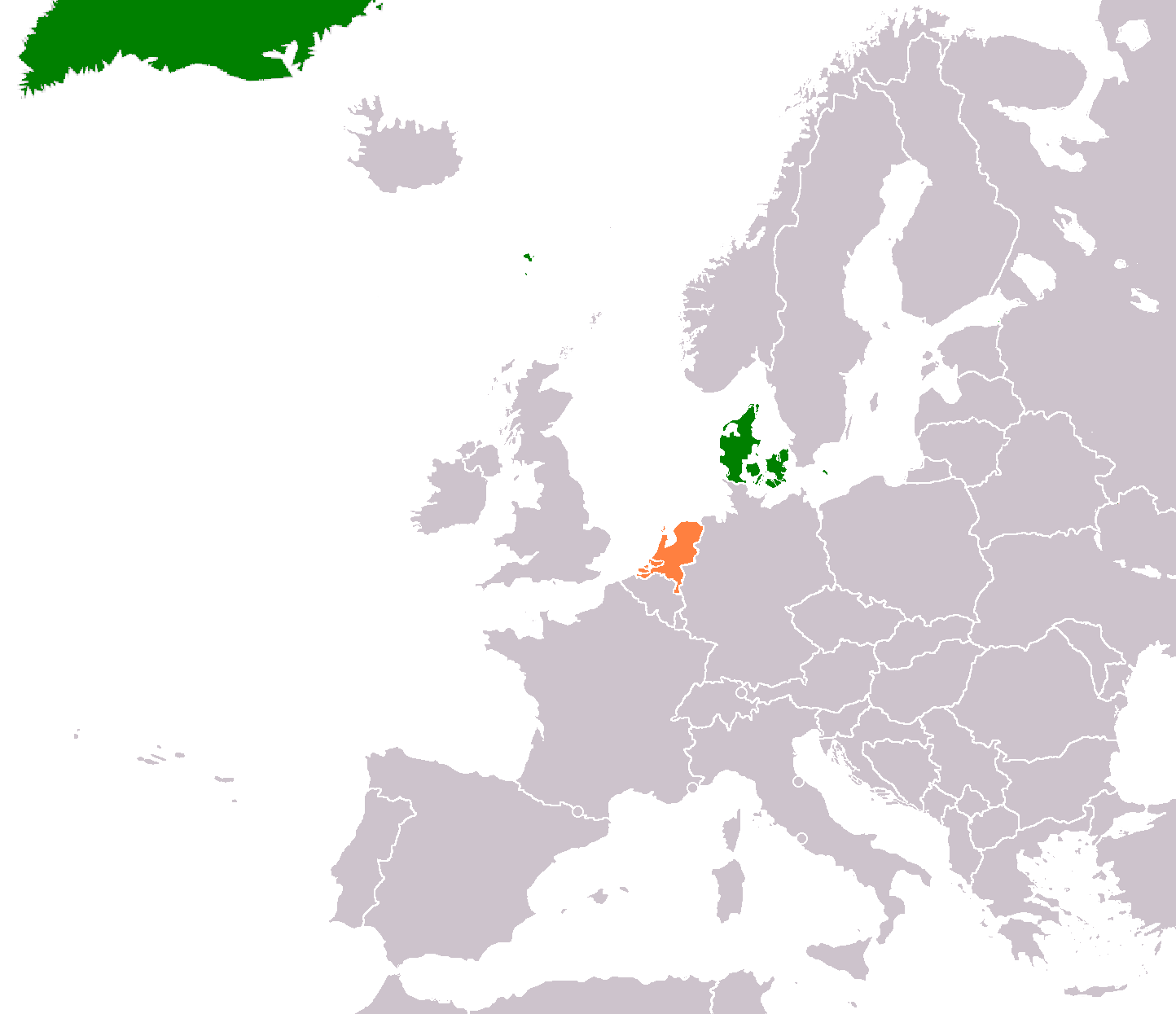
- Denmark: Netherlands

Diplomatic mission
- Embassy of Denmark, The Hague: Embassy of the Netherlands, Copenhagen

Denmark–Netherlands relations are the bilateral relations between Denmark and the Netherlands. The Netherlands has an embassy in Copenhagen and Denmark has an embassy in The Hague. Both countries are full members of the Joint Expeditionary Force, the Council of Europe, the European Union and NATO. Princess Beatrix is a Dame of the Order of the Elephant since 29 October 1975. On 31 January 1998, King Willem-Alexander of the Netherlands also received the Order of the Elephant.

Diplomatic relations were established on 31 March 1605.

== History ==
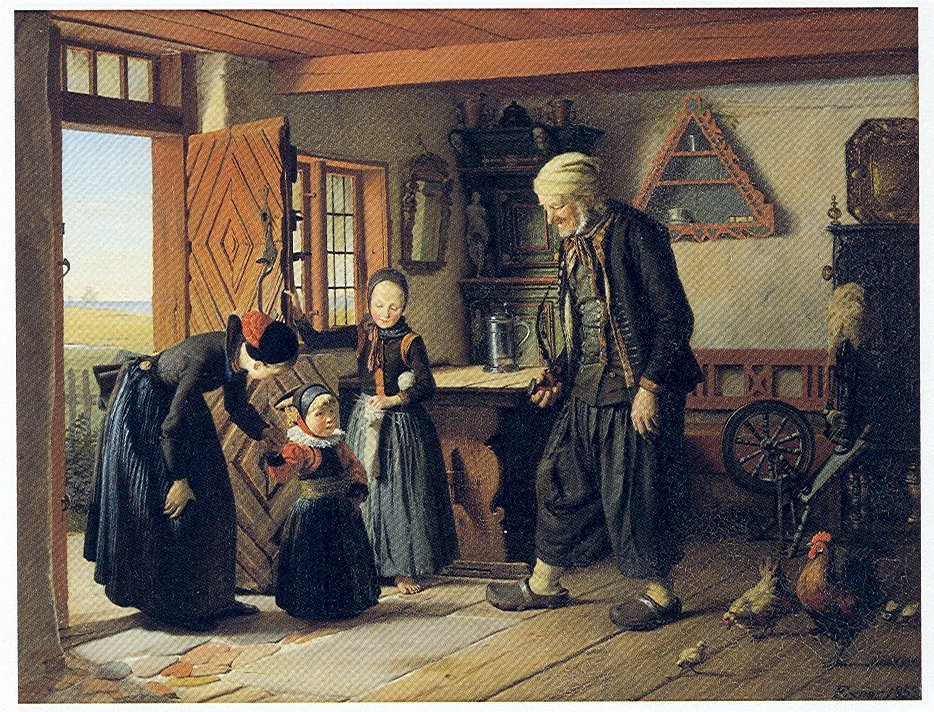
1853 painting by Julius Exner showing a family of Dutch descent at Amager.

In 1521, king Christian II of Denmark invited 184 Dutch farmers to settle on the island of Amager in exchange for supplying the Palace of Copenhagen with vegetables. The Dutch immigrants were exempt from Danish taxation and were given privileges such as being allowed to hunt most wild animals and having their own judicial system until 1823. Several names in the area and some surnames in Denmark give away the Dutch influences.

The first diplomatic ties between Denmark and the Netherlands were established 31 March 1605 when Isaac Pieterszoon van Amsterdam was appointed 'commissioner of the Sound', to ensure that Dutch trade ships would return to the Netherlands. 20 years before this, in 1584, Bartholomeüs Buijs was appointed as 'agent for Holland'.

=== War against the Netherlands 1542–1543 ===
In 1542, war broke out between France and the Holy Roman Empire. Emperor Charles V of the Holy Roman Empire supported Frederick II, Elector Palatine for the Danish crown, and Denmark participated in the war on the side of France. A year later, Denmark declared war on the Netherlands, at that time under Charles's rule. On 23 May 1544 the Treaty of Speyer was signed between Denmark and the Holy Roman Empire.

=== Torstenson War ===
The Torstenson War was a short period of conflict between Sweden and Denmark-Norway which occurred in 1643 to 1645 during the waning days of the Thirty Years' War. The Dutch Empire were allies with Sweden.

When the Torstenson War ended in 1645, Denmark and the Dutch Empire signed a treaty, which made Denmark and Netherlands allies.

=== Second Northern War ===
In 1657, during the Second Northern War, Denmark launched a war of revenge against Sweden which turned into a complete disaster. The war became a disaster for two reasons: Primarily, because Denmark's new powerful ally, the Netherlands, remained neutral as Denmark was the aggressor and Sweden the defender. Secondly, the Belts froze over in a rare occurrence during the winter of 1657–1658, allowing Charles X Gustav of Sweden to lead his armies across the ice to invade Zealand. In the Treaty of Roskilde, Denmark-Norway capitulated and in panic gave up all of Eastern Denmark in addition to the counties of Bohuslän and Trøndelag in Norway. Holstein-Gottorp was also tied to Sweden, providing a gateway for future invasions from the south. But the Second Northern War was not yet over. Three months after the peace treaty was signed, Charles X Gustav of Sweden held a council of war where he decided to simply wipe Denmark from the map and unite all of Scandinavia under his rule. Once again the Swedish army arrived outside Copenhagen. However, this time the Danes did not panic nor surrender, instead they decided to fight and prepared to defend Copenhagen. Frederick III of Denmark had stayed in his capital and now encouraged the citizens of Copenhagen to resist the Swedes, by saying he would die in his nest. Furthermore, this unprovoked declaration of war by Sweden finally triggered the alliance that Denmark-Norway had with the Netherlands. A powerful Dutch fleet was sent to Copenhagen with vital supplies and reinforcements, which saved the city from being captured during the Swedish attack, and possible saved Denmark from extinction. Furthermore, Brandenburg-Prussia, the Polish–Lithuanian Commonwealth and the Habsburg monarchy had gathered large forces to aid Denmark-Norway and fighting continued into 1659. Charles X Gustav of Sweden suddenly died of an illness in early 1660, while planning an invasion of Norway. Following his death, Sweden made peace in the Treaty of Copenhagen, returning only Trøndelag to Norway and Bornholm to Denmark, but keeping both Bohuslän and Terra Scania, mainly because the Netherlands and other European powers didn't want both sides of the Sound controlled by the Danish King again. Thus establishing the boundaries between Norway, Denmark, and Sweden that still exist today.

=== Second Anglo-Dutch War ===
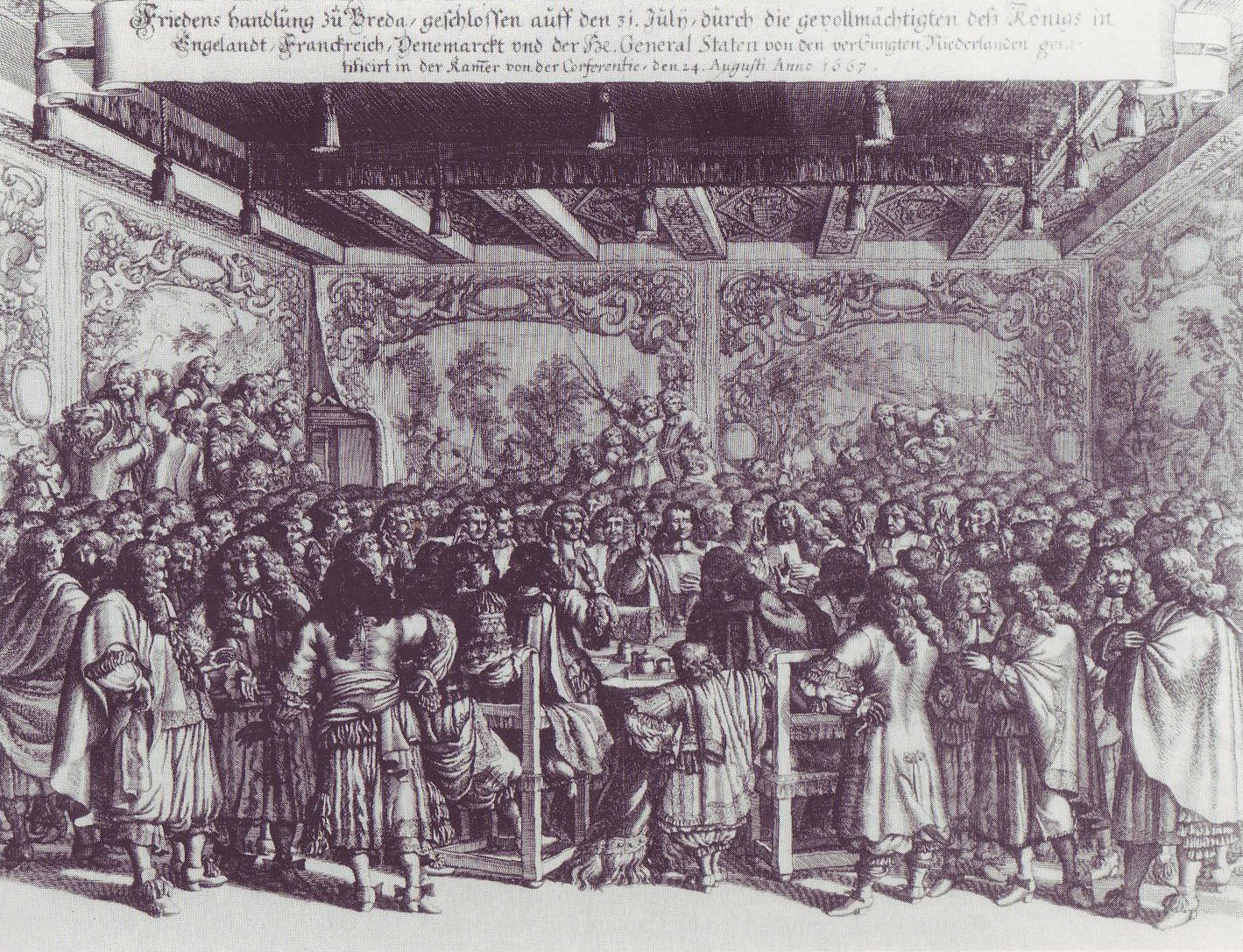
Contemporary engraving of the conclusion of the peace at Breda Castle.

In the Second Anglo-Dutch War, Denmark participated side by side with the Dutch Empire against the Kingdom of England, from 4 March 1665 until 31 July 1667. The war ended in a Dutch victory, and the Treaty of Breda was signed.

=== Third Anglo-Dutch War ===
The Third Anglo–Dutch War was a military conflict between England and the Dutch Republic lasting from 1672 to 1674. Denmark was allied with the Dutch Republic. It was part of the larger Franco-Dutch War. England's Royal Navy joined France in its attack on the Republic, but was frustrated in its attempts to blockade the Dutch coast by four strategic victories by Lieutenant-Admiral Michiel de Ruyter. An attempt to make the province of Holland an English protectorate rump state likewise failed. Parliament, fearful that the alliance with France was part of a plot to make England Roman Catholic, forced the king to abandon the costly and fruitless war.

=== Scanian War ===
The Scanian War (1675–1679) was a part of the Northern Wars involving the union of Denmark-Norway, Brandenburg and Swedish Empire. The war was prompted by the Swedish involvement in the Franco-Dutch War. Sweden had allied with France against several European countries. The Dutch Republic, under attack by France, sought support from Denmark-Norway. After some hesitation, King Christian V started the invasion of the Scania (Skåneland) in 1675, while the Swedish were occupied with a war against Brandenburg. The invasion of Scania was combined with a simultaneous Norwegian front called the Gyldenløve War, forcing the defending Swedes to fight a two-front war in addition to their entanglements in the Holy Roman Empire. The Danish objective was to retrieve the Scanian lands that had been ceded to Sweden in the Treaty of Roskilde, after the Northern Wars. Although the Danish offensive was initially a great success, Swedish counter-offensives led by the 19-year-old Charles XI of Sweden nullified much of the gain.

It was a war with no definite victor; the Swedish navy lost at sea, the Danish army was defeated in Scania by the Swedes, who in turn were defeated in Northern Germany by the Brandenburgers. The war and the hostilities ended when Denmark's ally the Dutch Republic settled with Sweden's stronger ally France and the Swedish king Charles XI married Danish princess Ulrike Eleonora, sister of Christian V. Peace was made on behalf of France with the treaties of Fontainebleau and Lund and Saint Germain, restoring most of the lost territories to Sweden.

=== 1900s ===
In the 1900s, many agreements were signed between both countries.

==== World War II ====
Both Denmark and the Netherlands were invaded by Nazi Germany, Denmark on 9 April 1940, and the Netherlands on 10 May 1940. After the German attack on Denmark, when the Germans used large numbers of airborne troops, the Dutch command became worried about the possibility they too could become the victim of such a strategic assault. To repulse an attack, five infantry battalions were positioned at the main ports and airbases, such as The Hague airfield of Ypenburg and the Rotterdam airfield of Waalhaven. These were reinforced by additional AA-guns, two tankettes and twelve of the 24 operational armoured cars. These specially directed measures were accompanied by more general ones: the Dutch had posted no less than 32 hospital ships throughout the country and fifteen trains to help make troop movements easier.

== International conflicts ==
Denmark had about 700 soldiers, and the Netherlands had 1,400 soldiers in Afghanistan. Both Denmark and the Netherlands sent troops to Iraq, as part of the Multi-National Force, in 2003. After the Gaza War, on 18 January 2009, both the Danish and the Dutch ministers of foreign affairs contributed to control the border between Egypt and Gaza.

== Trade ==
Since the Middle Ages, the trade between Denmark and the Netherlands with cattle was a great contributor to the economies of Denmark and the Netherlands. This trade peaked in the middle of the 17th century. In 2000, more than 65,000 dairy calves were exported to the Netherlands.

As of 2014 export from Denmark to the Netherlands amounted to €3.4 billion, while exports to Denmark from the Netherlands amounted to €5.5 billion. The Netherlands are Denmark's third largest import partner at 8% of imports, and its sixth largest export partner at 4.4% (2014).

=== Business deals ===
- 10 Danish Vestas V90-3MW wind turbines were sold to Aruba and Netherlands Antilles in 2008.
- APM Terminals operates a terminal - which opened in 2015 - at Rotterdam's Maasvlakte 2.
- TenneT and Energinet.dk signed for the construction of a 300 km electricity cable between the Netherlands and Denmark.
- Qutech (a cooperation of TNO and TU Delft) and Qdev have signed a memorandum of understanding for research in quantum technologies.
- Royal BAM Group was involved in the construction of the Great Belt Bridge and opened a division in Denmark in 2014. In 2015, the company won a bid worth €27 million to build a research lab at the Technical University of Denmark.

== Defense ==
Both countries are members of NATO. In August 2010, the Royal Dutch Army sent HNLMS Zierikzee for a NATO naval task force exercise in Denmark.

== Culture ==
Both Denmark and the Netherlands share social and cultural similarities. Both countries celebrate copper wedding anniversaries, which are commemorated at the 12 1/2-year mark; an anniversary not common elsewhere in the world. In addition, cycling features prominently in Denmark as it does in the Netherlands, with both countries having well-developed infrastructure to support the activity.

== International organizations ==
While the Netherlands is one of the founding members of the EU, Denmark became a member in 1973. Both countries are also founding members of NATO.

== Resident diplomatic missions ==
- Denmark has an embassy in The Hague.
- the Netherlands has an embassy in Copenhagen.
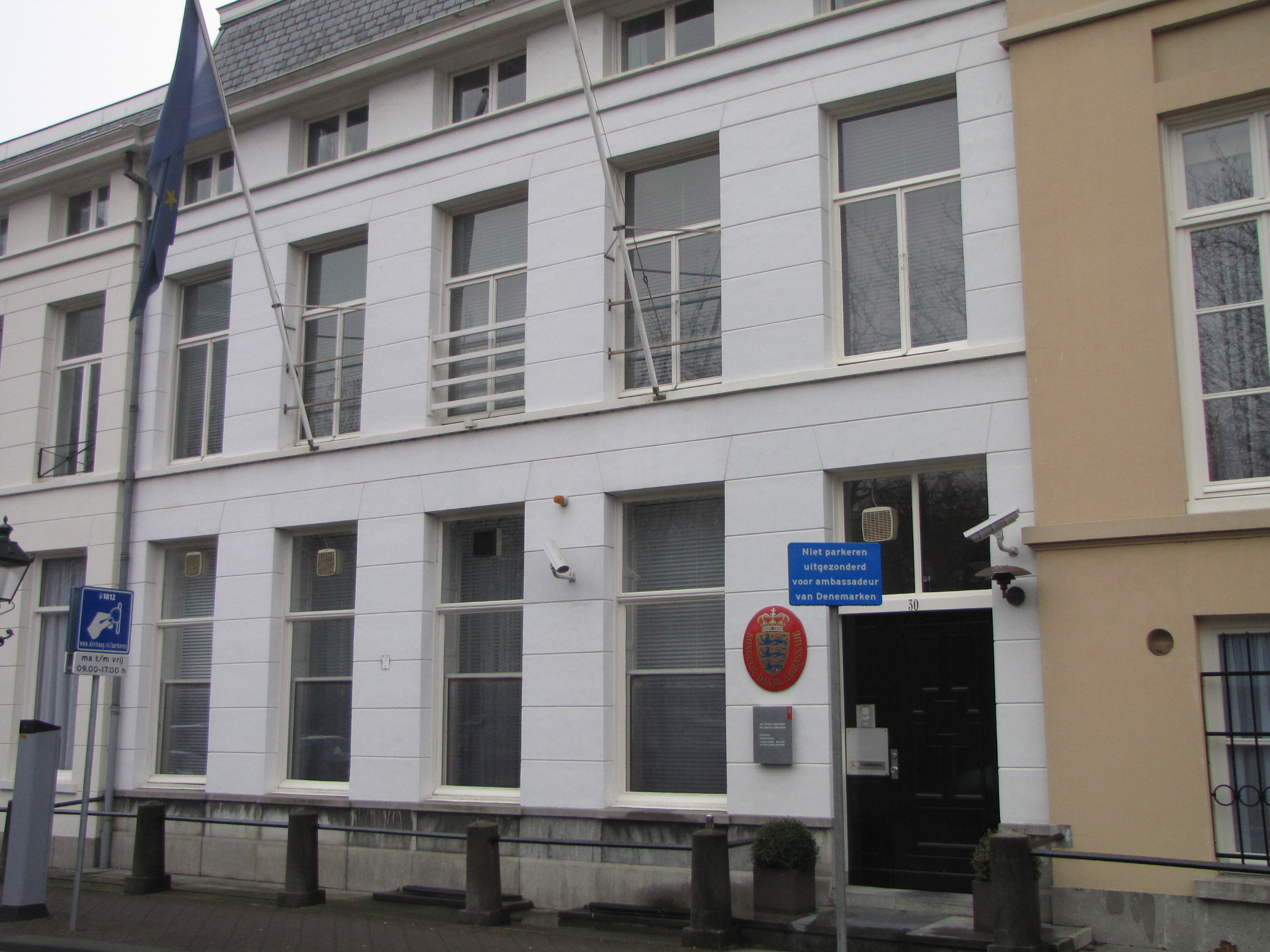
Embassy of Denmark in The Hague

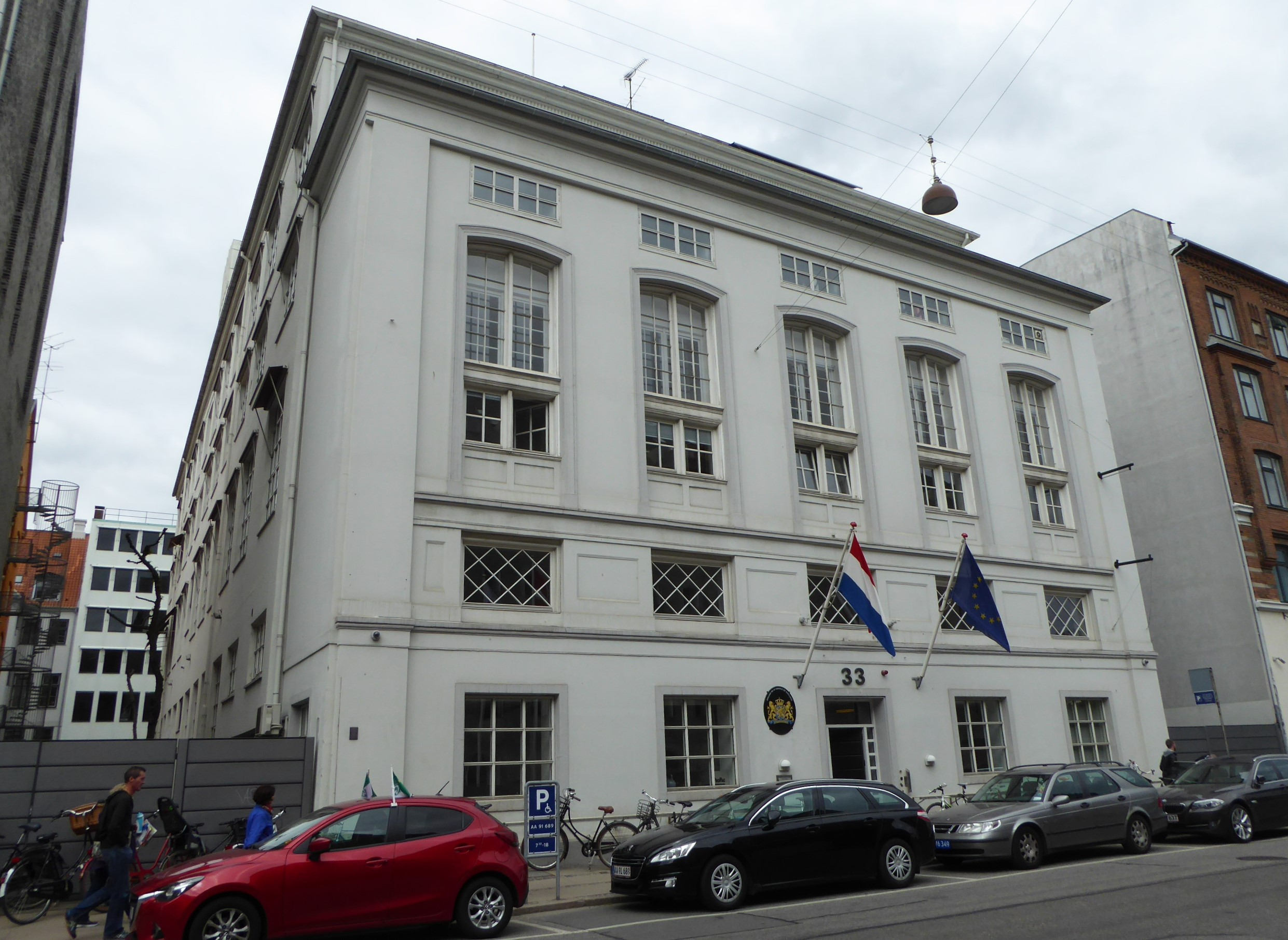
Embassy of the Netherlands in Copenhagen

== See also ==
- Foreign relations of Denmark
- Foreign relations of the Netherlands
- Capitulation in the Netherlands and Denmark
- NOGAT Pipeline System
