= Rydal, Sweden =

Rydal
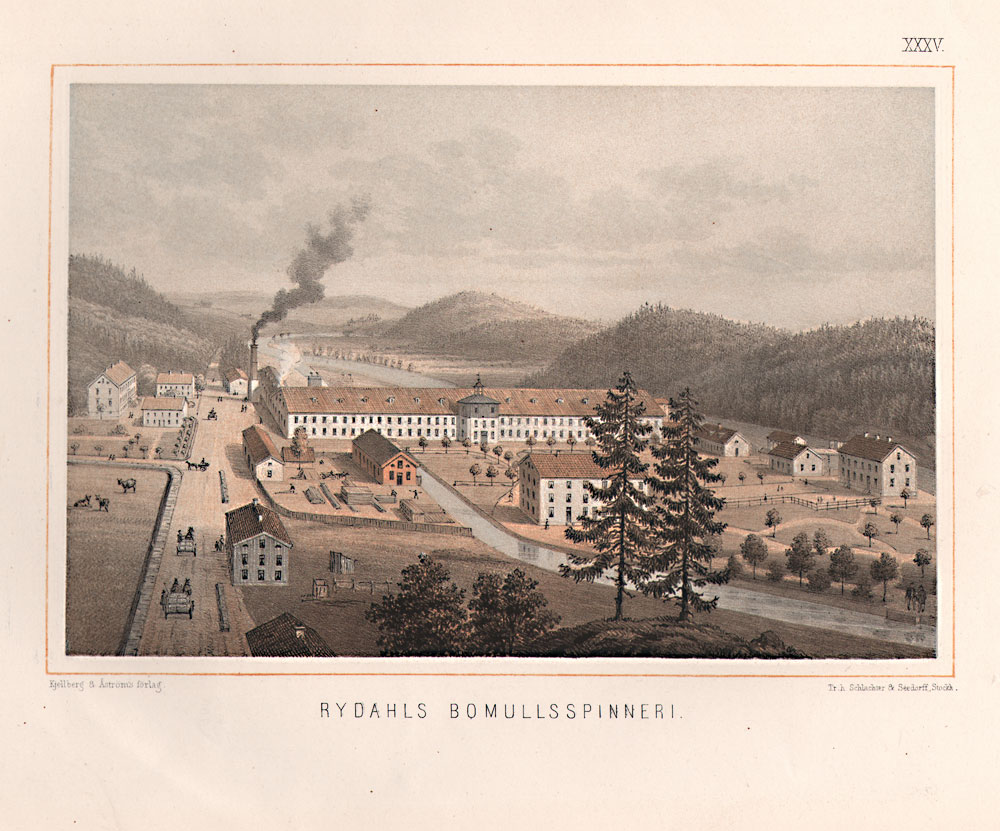
- 1870 illustration of the Rydal Cotton Mill, Mark, Sweden

- Location within Västra Götaland Location within Sweden
- Coordinates: 57°33′N 12°41′E
- Country: Sweden
- Province: Västergötland
- County: Västra Götaland County
- Municipality: Mark Municipality

Area
  - Total: 0.55 km^{2} (0.21 sq mi)

Population (31 December 2010)
  - Total: 402
  - Density: 733/km^{2} (1,900/sq mi)
- Time zone: UTC+1 (CET)
  - Summer (DST): UTC+2 (CEST)

Rydal (Swedish pronunciation: [rʏˈdɑːl]) is a locality situated in Mark Municipality, Västra Götaland County, Sweden. It had 402 inhabitants in 2010.
