= Denmark–Lithuania relations =

Diplomatic relations between Denmark and Lithuania

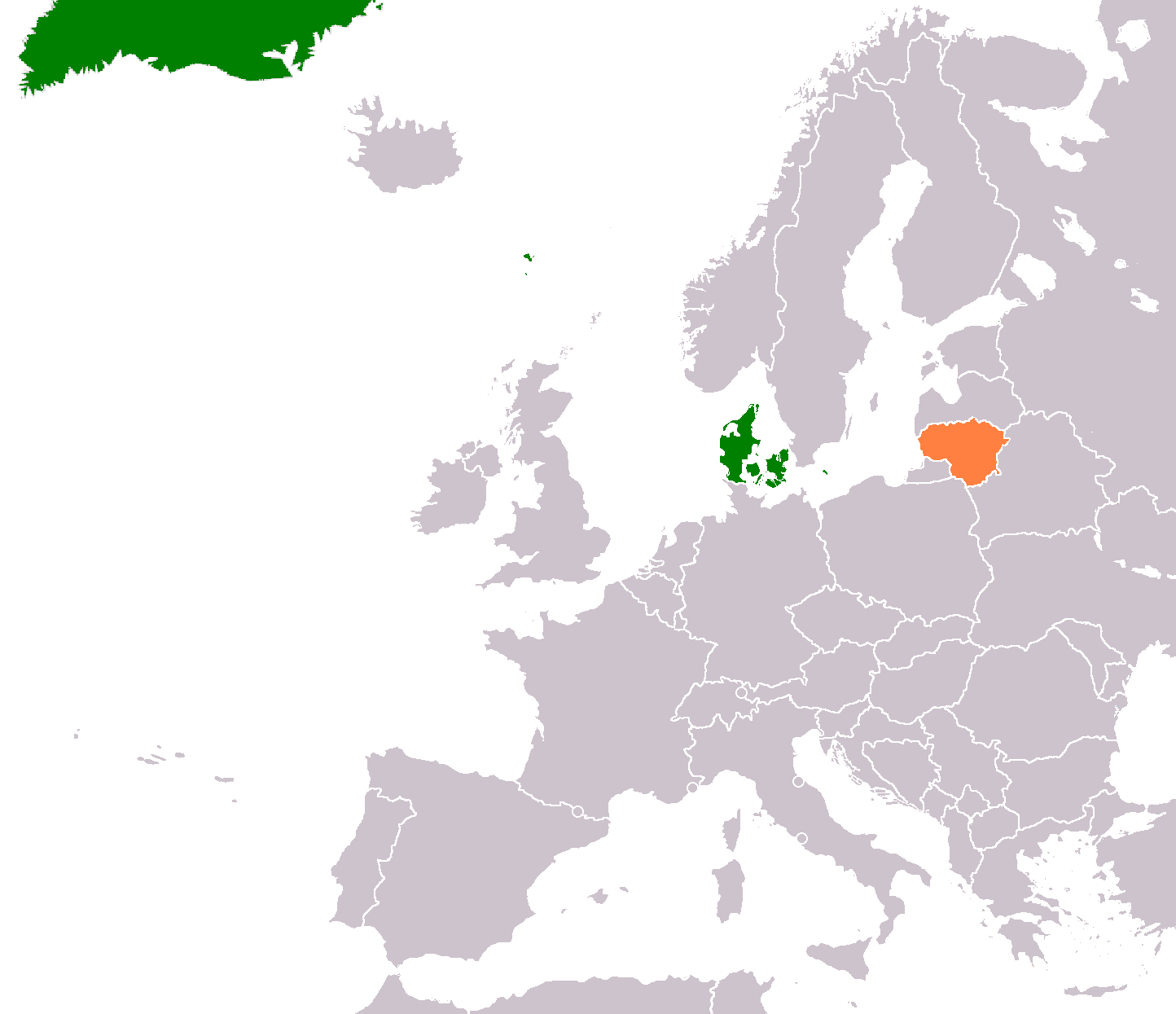

- Denmark: Lithuania

Denmark–Lithuania relations refers to the historical and current diplomatic relations between Denmark and Lithuania. Lithuania has an embassy in Copenhagen, and Denmark has an embassy in Vilnius. Denmark first recognized Lithuania in 1921 and again on 28 February 1991 after the fall of the Soviet Union. Diplomatic relations were established on 24 August 1991. The Danish recognition in 1991 has been described as "extremely important for Lithuania". Both countries are members of the European Union, NATO, Joint Expeditionary Force, Organization for Security and Co-operation in Europe, and Council of Europe.

Since Lithuanian independence, Denmark has taken a leading role in supporting Lithuania with international recognition and military and internal reforms. Denmark also played a significant role in Lithuania's accession to the EU and maintains a military presence in the country.

Relations have been described as a friendly political relationship with strong defence cooperation, and active trade and investment ties. The two countries cooperate closely on the political situation in Belarus and Ukraine with Denmark having sent four F-16 jets to Lithuania in 2022 as a response to the Russo-Ukrainian crisis.

== History ==
=== Early interactions ===
Interactions have existed between Denmark and Lithuania since the Middle Ages, which were intensified after the emergence of the Polish–Lithuanian Commonwealth. Denmark temporarily sided with the Teutonic Order during its war against Poland and Lithuania in 1409–1411. Prince George of Denmark was a candidate in the 1674 Polish–Lithuanian royal election. State-to-state level interactions ceased to exist with the dissolution of the Polish–Lithuanian monarchy by the end of the 18th century.

In the subsequent period, Lithuania had become an almost unknown culture and territory to the Danes. This changed after Danish traveler and ethnologist Åge Meyer Benedictsen published his oeuvre "Lithuania – the Awakening of a Nation. Pictures of Lithuanian Culture" in 1895. It contributed greatly to Lithuania's representation in Denmark.

=== Early diplomatic relations (1918–1940) ===
On 26 September 1921, Danish King Christian X endorsed the proposal from the Danish government to recognize Lithuania de jure. Denmark had coordinated this decision with Norway and Sweden and informed Lithuania of their decision on 28 September 1921.

Relations between the two countries were primarily focused on finding common ground on agriculture, infrastructure projects, trade, and economic cooperation. At first, Danish businesses wanted to use Lithuania as a bridge to the more difficult Russian market, but these hopes were abandoned and activities in Lithuania were more directed towards Lithuanian potential and development.

After World War I, as part of the Polish–Lithuanian War, the League of Nations planned on holding a referendum for the future of Vilnius and the border areas between Poland and Lithuania, and approached Denmark to send a small contingency acting as a peace-keeping force for the referendum. However, the referendum was not held and the Danish soldiers never left for Lithuania either.

Diplomatic relations ceased to exist during World War II as Denmark became occupied by Nazi Germany while Lithuania was occupied by the Soviet Union. No official contacts existed between Denmark and the Lithuanian Soviet Socialist Republic. Denmark never recognized Soviet sovereignty over Lithuania and was the first country to establish diplomatic relations with the new Lithuanian state on 24 August 1991, on the instruction of Foreign Minister Uffe Ellemann-Jensen.

=== Modern relations ===
==== Initial relations (1990–1991) ====
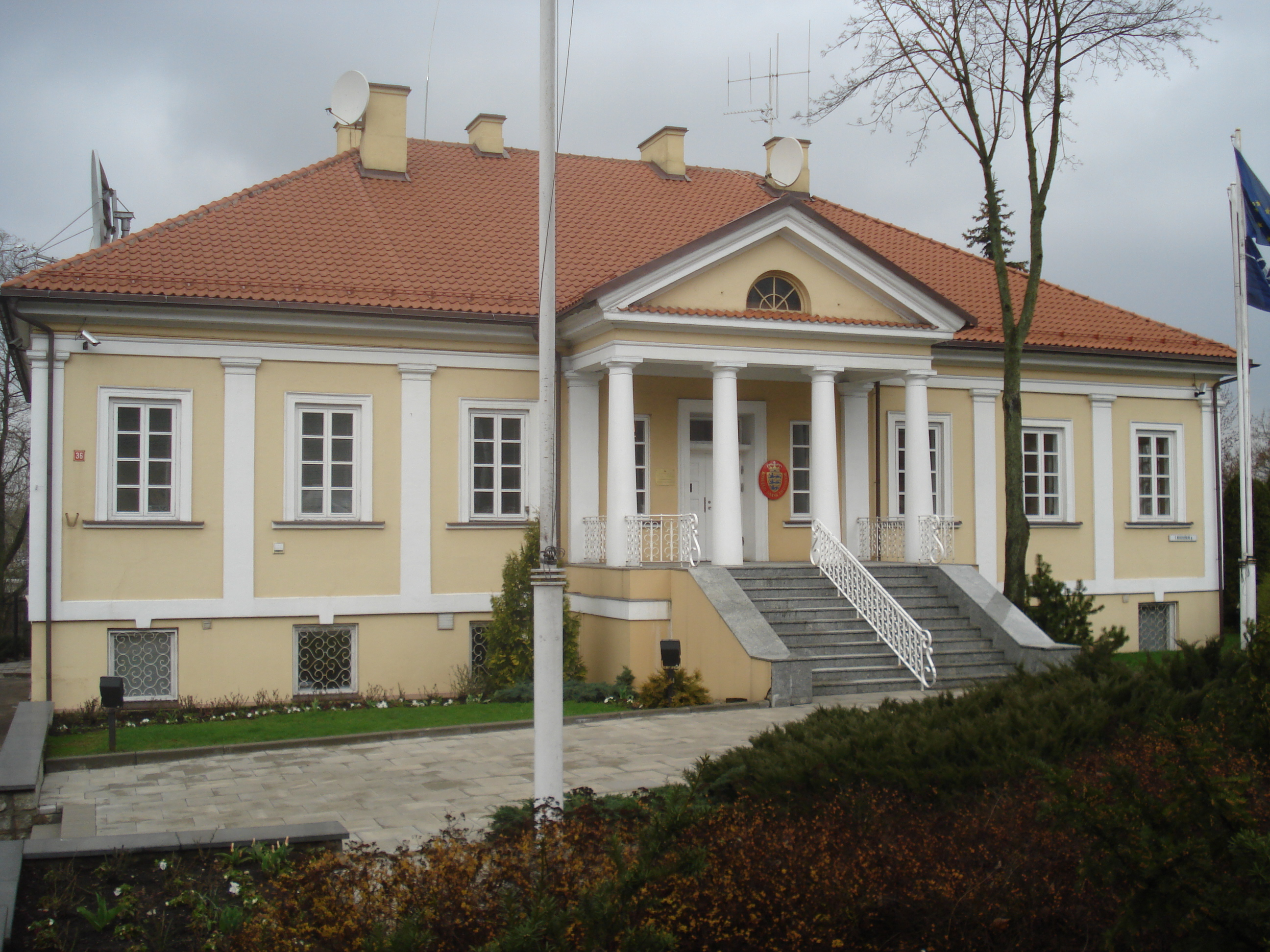
The Danish embassy in Vilnius at T. Kosciuškos street 36 since 29 October 1991.

Prior to the establishment of diplomatic relations, Lithuanian Prime Minister Kazimira Prunskienė had visited Denmark in April 1990, prompting protest from Soviet authorities. However, the Danes responded by stating that the recognition from 1921 was still valid.

On 20 December 1990, Lithuanian Foreign Minister Algirdas Saudargas visited Copenhagen for the opening of the Baltic Information Office, where he also met Ellemann-Jensen. The Baltic Office in Copenhagen played an instrumental role in the establishment of diplomatic relations between Lithuania and other states. The Baltic Office was closed and three separate Baltic embassies were established by the end of 1991. In February 1991, the two countries signed a joint protocol of cooperation in which it is stated that Denmark would continue to support Lithuania on the international scene and that diplomatic relations would resume. The Soviet Union reacted strongly to the statement. As diplomatic relations were established in August 1991, Queen Margrethe II insisted on receiving the three visiting Baltic foreign ministers despite being at her summer palace. Some weeks later, Elleman-Jensen visited Lithuania in his first visit to the country.

==== Military cooperation (1991–2006) ====
In September 1991, Audrius Butkevičius, General Director of the Lithuanian Defence Department, visited Copenhagen where he held various meetings to strengthen military relations, including with Chairman of the Parliamentary Defense Committee Hans Hækkerup. Hækkerup would later become Minister of Defence in 1993. Lithuania wished to become integrated into the European system of defense and have closer military relations with Denmark. For this, Denmark accredited the Danish Lieutenant Colonel Carsten Barløse as the first Defence Attaché to Lithuania in July 1992. One of the major tasks for the new Defence Attaché was to support the visit of Queen Margrethe II to Lithuania set to take place on 31 July 1992. During her visit, the Queen visited Antakalnis Cemetery. Later the same year, a Lithuanian military delegation led by Lieutenant Colonel Valdas Tutkus visited Denmark where they met Chief of Defence Jørgen Lyng. This was the first Lithuanian military delegation to another country and as part of the conversations on cooperation, Denmark agreed to train members of the Lithuanian National Defence Volunteer Forces in Denmark. In March 1994, the first agreement on military cooperation was signed focusing on the modernization of the Lithuanian armed forces. During the meeting, Denmark offered a handful of Lithuanian officers a chance of conducting a tour with the Danish battalion in Croatia where they would be able to collect first-hand impressions from a UN peacekeeping mission. On 16 July 1994, a Danish infantry platoon consisting of 87 men was deployed to Rukla by sea and air visiting different training areas to assess areas where the two armies could cooperate. This became the first NATO army unit on Lithuanian soil and was followed by another Danish military visit the next day as a Lockheed C-130 Hercules carrying 75 soldiers landed at Karmelava military airport. The goal of the second unit was to train Lithuanian officers for the mission to Croatia, an operation which would give them international experience. On 22 August 1994, the joint Danish and Lithuanian unit deployed to Croatia as part of the United Nations Protection Force. In 1996, Lithuania also joined Denmark in the Implementation Force in Bosnia and Herzegovina, in the Kosovo Force in Kosovo and Dancon/Irak in Iraq. About a thousand Lithuanian soldiers were trained for these missions.

Throughout the 1990s, Denmark had become a staunch supporter of incorporating Lithuania into NATO and the EU and rendered considerable assistance to Lithuania militarily and economically. Lithuania becoming a member of NATO in 2004 was a Danish goal and the military cooperation only continued afterwards. The Mechanised Infantry Brigade Iron Wolf became affiliated with the Danish Division in 2006 and some of its officials were based in Haderslev.

From 1996 to 2007, Lithuanian naval officers studied at the Royal Danish Naval Academy and procured 3 Standart Flex 300 vessels from Denmark between 2007 and 2010.

In 2011, Danish Defence Minister Nick Hækkerup visited Lithuania.

==== Danish support for EU membership (1993–2004) ====
When Denmark took over the Presidency of the Council of the European Union in 1993, the council assured that Lithuania would become a member of the union as soon as the Copenhagen criteria were fulfilled. For this, Denmark supported and mentored Lithuania on wide-range subjects from negotiations with the European Union to local bureaucratic projects. To prepare ten Eastern European countries for EU membership, Denmark began the FEU program of which Lithuania received the most funds and most projects (26% of projects and 33% of committed funds). At the Helsinki European Council in 1999, Lithuania presented the results of their reforms to the council which exceeded expectations, and Denmark could therefore rely on these results in persuading the other EU countries for a Lithuanian membership. As the EU opened negotiations with Lithuania after the Helsinki meeting, Denmark began assisting Lithuania so the latter would be better equipped for the negotiations. Denmark moreover negotiated for financial support from the EU for Lithuania to close down Ignalina Nuclear Power Plant – a prerequisite for membership. In 2002, Lithuanian President Valdas Adamkus stated that Denmark was the largest sponsor of the country.

Lithuania became a member of the European Union on 1 May 2004.

== Visits by Danish Prime Ministers and Lithuanian Presidents ==
Lithuanian President Rolandas Paksas visited Denmark in April 2003 and Dalia Grybauskaitė visited in both 2013 and 2016.

Conversely, Danish Prime Minister Poul Nyrup Rasmussen visited Lithuania in 2000, Anders Fogh Rasmussen in 2005, Helle Thorning-Schmidt in 2011 and Lars Løkke Rasmussen in 2018.

Due to the Russian invasion of Ukraine, Danish Prime Minister Mette Frederiksen accompanied by leaders of five parliamentary parties paid a visit to the Šiauliai Air Base in late March 2022. The air base hosted Danish F-16 jets.

== Trade ==
Trade between the two countries have been described as healthy. The following table shows the annual trade numbers between the two countries from 1992 to 2020 in euro:

Year	Lithuanian imports to Denmark	Danish imports to Lithuania
1992	€45.63 million	€34.85 million
1993	€38.59 million	€25.8 million
1994	€61.95 million	€59.26 million
1995	€72.24 million	€100.29 million
1996	€86.91 million	€134.3 million
1997	€102.3 million	€213.1 million
1998	€139.52 million	€219.04 million
1999	€186.46 million	€224.86 million
2000	€235.49 million	€210.62 million
2001	€249.15 million	€251.05 million
2002	€268.34 million	€264.19 million
2003	€282.3 million	€247.77 million
2004	€293.27 million	€218.4 million
2005	€268.49 million	€222.7 million
2006	€298.35 million	€287.53 million
2007	€337.36 million	€363.32 million
2008	€539.95 million	€339.38 million
2009	€362.01 million	€213.14 million
2010	€397.83 million	€240.43 million
2011	€377.12 million	€347.91 million
2012	€442.96 million	€341.59 million
2013	€438.05 million	€367 million
2014	€484.46 million	€336.21 million
2015	€513.31 million	€360.31 million
2016	€463.45 million	€375.01 million
2017	€534.61 million	€406.29 million
2018	€669.55 million	€448.17 million
2019	€655.05 million	€412.75 million
2020	€664.15 million	€377.09 million

== See also ==
- Foreign relations of Denmark
- Foreign relations of Lithuania
- Baltic Air Policing
- Operation Saber Strike

== Bibliography ==
- Poulsen, Niels Bo; Brask, Hans, eds. (2021), Denmark and Lithuania through 100 years of bilateral relations, Latvia, ISBN 978-609-96256-0-7
