= Denmark–Latvia relations =

Diplomatic relations between Denmark and Latvia

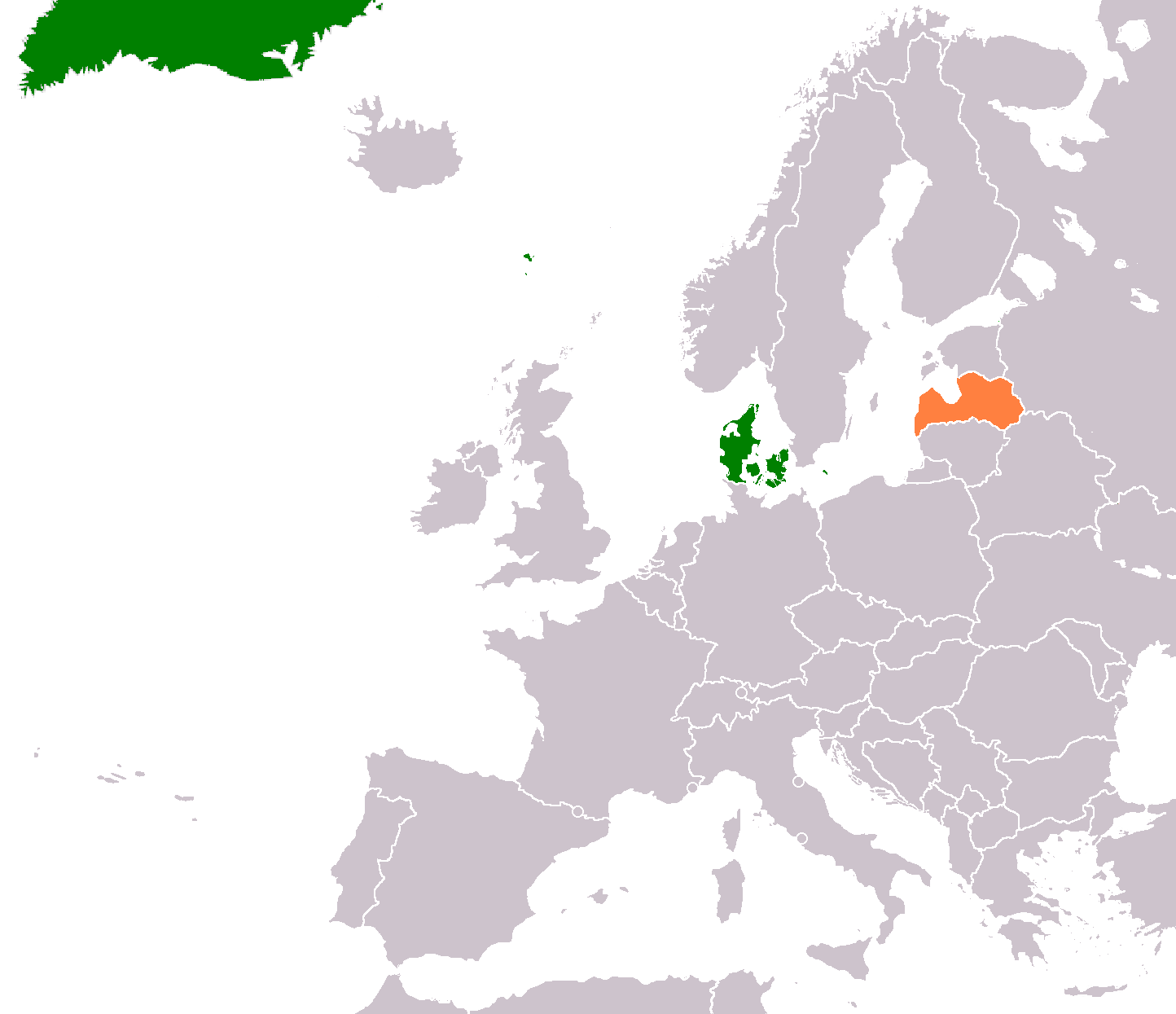

- Denmark: Latvia

Diplomatic mission
- Embassy of Denmark, Riga: Embassy of Latvia, Copenhagen

Denmark–Latvia relations refers to the historical and current diplomatic relations between Denmark and Latvia. Denmark has an embassy in Riga and Latvia has an embassy in Copenhagen.

Denmark recognized and established diplomatic relations with Latvia on 7 February 1921. Diplomatic relations were reestablished on 24 August 1991, during the fall of the Soviet Union. Diplomatic relations have since then been strong and Latvian President Ulmanis stated in 2016 that Latvia has considered Denmark a trustworthy ally since 1919.

In 2022, as a response to the Russian invasion of Ukraine, Denmark sent around 800 soldiers to Ādaži, Latvia and Danish Prime Minister Mette Frederiksen moreover visited Ādaži in May 2022. Both countries are full members of the European Union, NATO, Nordic-Baltic Eight and the Joint Expeditionary Force.

== History ==
=== Christianization of the Baltics and Danish Livonia (1200s–1583) ===
Danish kings have historically had interests in Livonia (present-day Latvia) since the 13th century. The Danish king and Bishop Albert of Riga reached an agreement to Christianize the region as Denmark had the responsibility to not only Christianize Livonia but also Courland, Saaremaa and Estonian seaside territories. As Denmark and the bishop were advancing in their crusade, the Treaty of Stensby was signed in 1238 between Denmark and the State of the Teutonic Order transferring the northern maritime Estonia to Denmark in exchange for military support for the Teutonic Order in their crusades. Evidence indicate that Danish crusaders participated in battles in present-day Latvia as well. The Danish king sold Estonia with the exceptions of Saaremaa to the Teutonic Order in 1346.

In 1566, Magnus, Duke of Holstein attempted to reach an agreement with the Polish–Lithuanian Commonwealth to regain the lost territory but failed to do so. He consequently reached an agreement with Ivan the Terrible and Magnus was installed as King of the Bishopric of Courland. Parts of Estonia was handed over to the brother of King Frederick II. In 1582, Magnus changed allegiance to Stefan Bathory of Poland-Lithuania but refrained from swearing allegiance which meant that Courland was Danish property. After the death of Magnus in 1583, ownership of the territory went to Friedrich Kettler who had strong support from the Lutheran locals who did not wish to be under the dominance of the Catholic Poland-Lithuania. This in turn increased tensions between Denmark and Poland-Lithuania and Poland paid Denmark 30.000 thalers for the territory.

=== Early relations with Latvia (1918–1940) ===
Danish volunteers travelled to Latvia and fought on the Latvian side during the Latvian War of Independence from 1918 to 1921. Officially, Denmark treated the Latvian war very cautiously due to its respect for Nicholas II of Russia whose mother had been a Danish princess.

From 1919 on, Denmark was one of the main channels of communications for the Latvian Provisional Government and many Latvian politicians including Kārlis Ulmanis travelled to Denmark to garner support in Western Europe on 9 January 1919 as the Bolsheviks were approaching Latvia. A Latvian representative mission was planned to open in Copenhagen since all communication to the outside world was through Denmark. The consulate general opened in November 1919, as Denmark also had a consulate in Riga.

Denmark went on to recognize Latvia and establish diplomatic relations with the country on 7 February 1921, despite critical voices on the nationalization policies by Latvia which had affected Danish possessions in the country. A Treaty of Commerce and Navigation was signed in November 1924.

In 1925, when Royal Danish Navy ships made an official visit to the Freeport of Riga, newspaper Latvijas Kareivis published an article stating that: "The name of Denmark is for Latvians dear and close to heart – dear because as a small country. Denmark has much in common with Latvia. We regard Danes as our teachers in those areas of economy that make up the foundation for the welfare of our fatherland..."

Throughout the Cold War, Denmark never recognized the Soviet annexation of Latvia after the 1940 occupation.

=== Modern relations ===
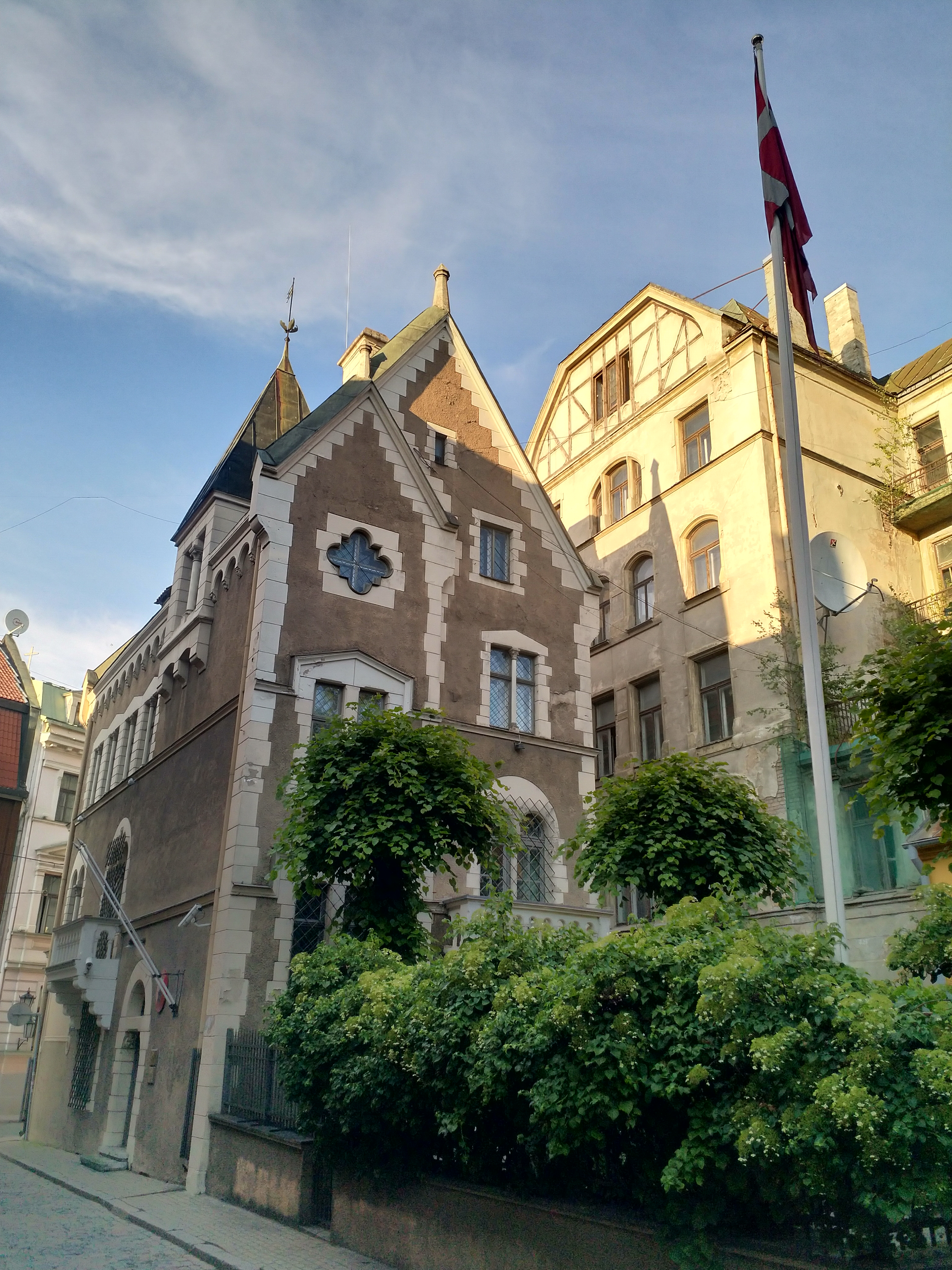
Danish embassy in Riga since 2 October 1991.

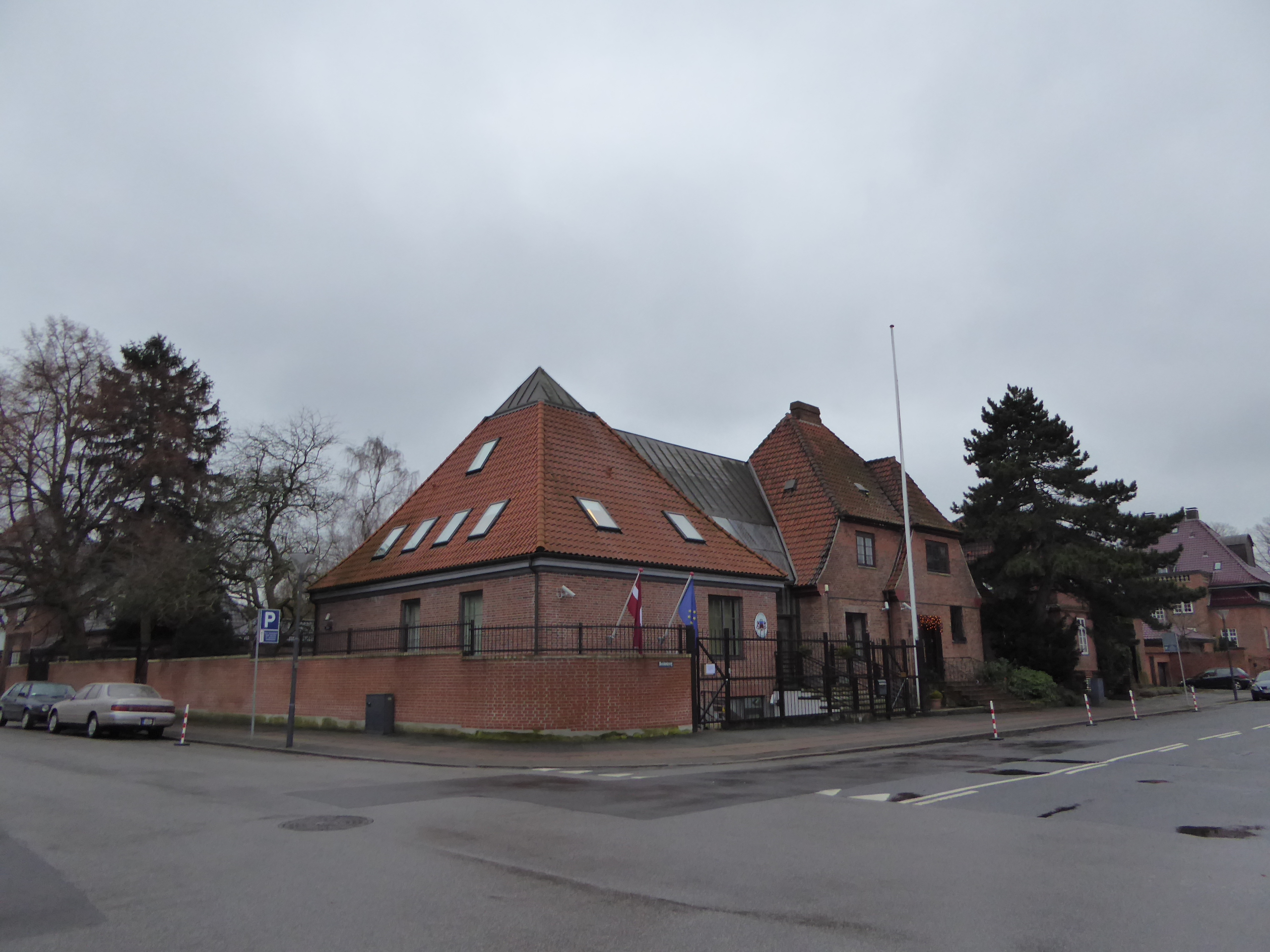
Latvian embassy in Copenhagen since 12 November 1992.

==== Initial relations (1990–1994) ====
Cultural contacts increased in 1989 and 1990, with the Latvian Foreign Minister Jānis Jurkāns visiting Copenhagen on 28 August 1990 to strengthen cultural cooperation. A Danish Cultural Institute office also opened in Riga on 20 December 1990. Politically, Danish Foreign Minister Uffe Ellemann-Jensen held a speech at the United Nations in September 1990 expressing a wish to have the three Baltic states as members of the organization. In the months preceding the reestablishment of diplomatic relations, Jurkāns developed closer relations with high-ranking Danish politicians as he met with both Ellemann-Jensen and Prime Minister Poul Schlüter. On 11 March 1991, a cooperation protocol was signed stating that Denmark had already recognized the independence of Latvia back in 1921. This move provoked a strong reaction from the Soviet Union but Denmark rejected the criticism arguing that the cooperation was in line with international law, with Ellemann-Jensen moreover stating that Denmark would renew diplomatic relations with Latvia as soon as possible.

During the Soviet coup d'état attempt from 19 to 22 August 1991, Jurkāns travelled to Copenhagen with the intention of forming a government in exile, as the Supreme Council of Latvia declared independence on 21 August. Denmark sent a diplomatic note to Latvia on 24 August assuring that it was ready to establish relations with the new republic. Diplomatic relations were renewed on 24 August 1991 making Denmark the first country to do so. On 26 August, Jurkāns met Queen Margrethe II in Copenhagen and a joint communiqué with the three Baltic Foreign Ministers were signed same day stating: "This is a decisive moment in the history of the peoples of Estonia, Latvia and Lithuania. 52 years after the conclusion of the infamous Molotov - Ribbentrop Pact and the subsequent illegal Soviet annexation, a long, dark chapter in Baltic history has finally come to an end. We rejoice at his momentous event." Danish Foreign Minister Ellemann-Jensen visited Latvia on 9 September to strengthen relations and the Danish embassy in Riga was opened on 2 October 1991. Latvia opened their embassy in Copenhagen on 12 November 1992. The Danish Queen also visited Latvia in 1992.

In April 1994, President Ulmanis visited Copenhagen to meet Prime Minister Poul Nyrup Rasmussen to discuss Latvian relations with Russia as the latter still had troops in Latvia. During the meeting, the Danish Prime Minister assured Ulamnis that his country would spearheard a European coalition to make Russia withdraw their troops from Latvia.

In March 1995, Nyrup Rasmussen visited Riga where he met President Ulmanis. During his March 1997 visit to Denmark where he also met the Queen, Ulmanis pointed out that Denmark was helping Latvia shape its own security policy.

To prepare ten Eastern European countries for EU membership, Denmark began the FEU program of which Latvia was second in receiving most funds and projects after Lithuania (27% of projects and 23% of committed funds) between the years 1996 to 2000.

==== Environmental assistance (1991–2003) ====
Denmark aided Latvia with 400 million DKK for various environmental projects from 1991 to 2000 making Denmark the largest donors for the Latvia on the environment. A further 40 million DKK was granted in 2001 for 12 projects. The projects included construction of wastewater treatment plants, support for the implementation of an Biodiversity action plan, support for chemical control and the implementation of EU Ambient Air Quality Directive. In 2003, 25 million DKK was granted for 8 projects as the assistance concluded that same year.

The assistance was granted to help Latvia fulfill the environmental criteria on EU-membership.

== Defense cooperation ==
Defense cooperation is based on the January 1994 agreement on the promotion of military cooperation between the two countries. In 1995, 32 officials from the Latvian Land Forces received training in Denmark. Defense cooperation continued throughout the 1990s and Denmark provided significant material support for different projects including reforming the National Defence Academy of Latvia. In 2003, Latvia began the process of forming an infantry brigade with support from Denmark and also sent soldiers to Kosovo alongside Danish troops as part of the Kosovo Force. In 2005, Denmark trained Latvian arms control specialists. In 2022, 750 Danish soldiers arrived in Latvia as a response to the Russian invasion of Ukraine.

== Visits by Danish Prime Ministers and Latvian Presidents ==
Kārlis Ulmanis was the first Latvian President to visit Denmark in 1919. President Guntis Ulmanis also visited Denmark in March 1997, Vīķe-Freiberga in 2006, Valdis Zatlers in 2009, Raimonds Vējonis and 2017 and Egils Levits in 2021.

From the Danish side, Danish Prime Minister Helle Thorning-Schmidt visited Latvia in 2011, Lars Løkke Rasmussen in 2018 and Mette Frederiksen in 2020 and again in 2022.

== Trade ==
The following table shows the annual trade numbers between the two countries from 1992 to 2020 in euro:

Year	Latvian imports to Denmark	Danish imports to Latvia
1992	€22.77 million	€21.91 million
1993	€73.05 million	€24.69 million
1994	€35.14 million	€37.39 million
1995	€40.1 million	€48.78 million
1996	€58.34 million	€71.23 million
1997	€79.9 million	€82.89 million
1998	€92.85 million	€110.35 million
1999	€122.5 million	€107.56 million
2000	€141.91 million	€113.01 million
2001	€193.15 million	€140.13 million
2002	€172.15 million	€142.41 million
2003	€204.89 million	€135.98 million
2004	€181.52 million	€147.13 million
2005	€201.09 million	€164.68 million
2006	€244.66 million	€228.63 million
2007	€244.9 million	€304.03 million
2008	€323.25 million	€241.45 million
2009	€246.18 million	€140.22 million
2010	€234.1 million	€160.7 million
2011	€309.02 million	€197.94 million
2012	€367.41 million	€229.04 million
2013	€404.19 million	€225.07 million
2014	€384.47 million	€228.88 million
2015	€429.7 million	€243.78 million
2016	€437.39 million	€238.72 million
2017	€426.37 million	€261.7 million
2018	€529.28 million	€265.57 million
2019	€493.78 million	€243.41 million
2020	€556.13 million	€250.8 million

== Resident diplomatic missions ==
- Denmark has an embassy in Riga.
- Latvia has an embassy in Copenhagen.

== See also ==
- Foreign relations of Denmark
- Foreign relations of Latvia
- Baltic Air Policing
- Operation Saber Strike
- Richard Gustav Borgelin

== Bibliography ==
- Danish Cultural Institute (2021), Ties Through Time: Denmark-Latvia (pdf), p. 36
- Kirkebaek, Mikkel (2016), Danish volunteer soldiers in Latvia's war of independence - 1919, p. 31
- Kļaviņš, Didzis (2016), The Role of Denmark in the Renewal of Latvian Independence (PDF)
- Poulsen, Niels Bo; Brask, Hans, eds. (2021), Denmark and Lithuania through 100 years of bilateral relations, Latvia, p. 335, ISBN 978-609-96256-0-7
