= Malene Rydahl =

Danish writer (born 1975)

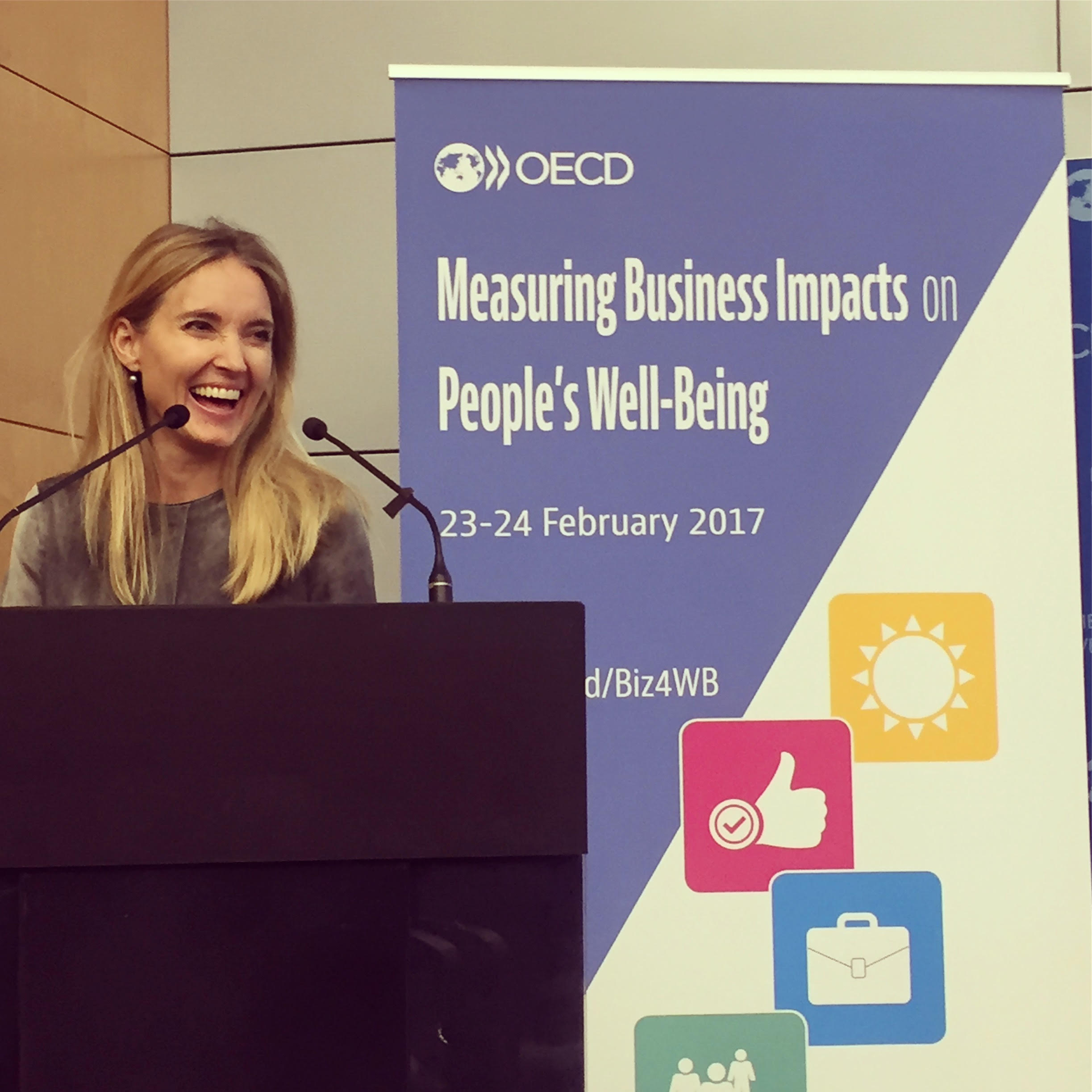
- Malene Rydahl talking at OECD (Paris, 2017)
- Born: 1975 (age 50–51); Aarhus, Denmark
- Occupations: Writer, speaker, executive coach
- Website: www.malenerydahl.com

Malene Rydahl (born 1975, Aarhus, Denmark) is a former executive in corporate communication and currently a writer, speaker and executive coach specializing in happiness, well-being, leadership and management.

She is the author of the book Happy as a Dane, initially published in France by Grasset (Heureux comme un Danois) in April 2014. The book has been translated and published in more than 12 countries including in the United States, published by Norton. Her second book Le Bonheur sans illusions ('Happiness without illusions') has been published by Flammarion in France in September 2017. Her third book Je te réponds... moi non plus ('To reply or not to reply') has been published by Flammarion in France in February 2020. In 2024, L’Empathie, ça s’apprend ('Learning aboug empathy') is published.

After the publication of her first book, Malene Rydahl was given the honorary title of Goodwill ambassador of the city of Copenhagen. In 2018, she was awarded the medal of Chevalier de l’Ordre des Arts et des Lettres, an honor given by the French state.

== Career ==
Malene Rydahl worked 18 years in the corporate world as an executive in corporate communication before starting a career as a writer, keynote speaker and executive coach.

After 6 years as a manager and executive at Bang & Olufsen in France, she joined the advertising agency Les Ouvriers du Paradis (WPP group) as the account manager of Le Bon Marché (LVMH group). She then joined Hyatt Hotels Corporation, and was the group's director of corporate communication for the EAME region until 2015.

Malene Rydahl has a degree in international business strategy from the Niels Brock business school of Copenhagen.

Her professional career qualified her as one of the "24 women of 2012" according to the French weekly magazine L'Express.

Alongside her work at Hyatt, she started a career as a writer and keynote speaker specialized in happiness, leadership and well-being, using the case study of Denmark, her native country, regularly at the top of international rankings on happiness. She explores why Danish employees are some of the happiest in the world, and the positive impact of happiness on economic results. She wrote Heureux comme un Danois ("Happy as a Dane") published by Grasset in France in April 2014. The book became a best-seller and was awarded the Prize for the Most Optimistic Book in the same year. It has since been published in the United States, South Korea, Japan, Taiwan, Russia, Germany, Spain, Poland and other countries.

Since 2015, Malene Rydahl is a full-time writer, keynote speaker and executive coach. She graduated from the prestigious school of coaching Manning Inspire in Copenhagen. In her second book Le Bonheur sans illusions she questions the link people assume between happiness on the one hand and money, power, beauty, fame and sex on the other hand.

She published in 2020 a third book, titled Je te réponds... moi non plus ('To reply or not to reply') and released by French publisher Flammarion, in which she examines "non-response", a social phenomenon that has exploded with the ever growing possibilities of digital communication in our lives (emails, instant messaging, social networks ...). With L’Empathie, ça s’apprend (2024), she describes the benefits of empathy from an early age, but also in the workplace.

== Teaching, public speaking and other commitments ==
Rydahl is a lecturer at the prestigious French business school HEC Executive Education and at Sciences Po Paris where she teaches about the Danish leadership model. Since 2021, she is Senior Advisor at Boston Consulting Group specialized in well-being and performance.

As a speaker, Malene Rydahl takes part in various events organized by international corporations, public institutions and non-profit organizations on happiness at work and management practices. Among other interventions, Malene Rydahl was invited in February 2016 by Ángel Gurría, secretary general of the OECD, to present her work to the organization's experts. She has also spoken at the École nationale d'administration – France's national school for the highest civil servants – and she gave a TEDx talk at the INSEAD business school in Singapore in 2015.

In 2018, she was part of the official delegation of the French President Emmanuel Macron for his state visit to Denmark. On that same year, she was awarded the medal of Chevalier de l’Ordre des Arts et des Lettres, an honor given by the French state.

Alongside the release of her book L’Empathie, ça s’apprend (in 2024), the author participated in the experimental implementation of ‘empathy classes’ in two Parisian secondary schools. She accompanied [Gabriel Attal], then Minister of Education, to Denmark, where such classes are already part of the school curriculum. In autumn 2023, the French government announced the introduction of empathy classes in schools for the following academic year, as a means to prevent [bullying].

== Bibliography ==
- Heureux comme un Danois, Grasset, 2014. ISBN 978-2-246-85229-2
- Le bonheur sans illusions, Flammarion, 2017. ISBN 978-2-08-141840-0
- Je te réponds... moi non plus, Flammarion, 2020. ISBN 978-2-08-150549-0
- L'empathie, ça s'apprend. Demandez le programme !, Presses de la Cité, 2024. ISBN 978-2258208445
