= Albania–NATO relations =

- NATO: Albania

The accession of Albania to NATO took place in 2009. Albania's relationship with the North Atlantic Treaty Organization (NATO) began in 1992 when it joined the North Atlantic Cooperation Council. In 1994, it entered NATO's Partnership for Peace, which began Albania's process of accession into the alliance. In 1999, the country received a Membership Action Plan (MAP). The country received an invitation to join at the 2008 Bucharest Summit and became a full member on April 1, 2009.

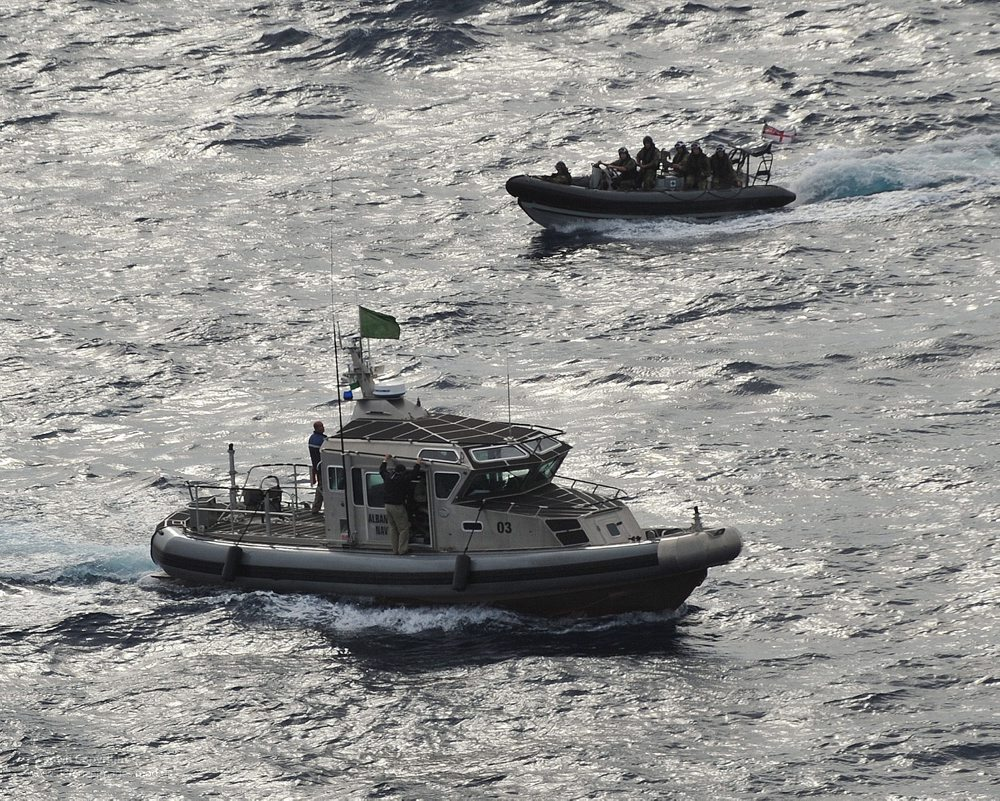
Royal Navy with Albanian Naval Forces Patrol Boat during NATO Joint exercises

Albania was among the first Eastern European countries to join the Partnership for Peace programme. Albanian politicians considered admission to NATO a top priority. Since 1992 Albania has been extensively engaged with NATO and has maintained its position as a stability factor and a strong ally of United States and EU in the troubled and divided region of the Balkans. In addition to the political will, according to Sali Berisha, the overwhelming majority of 95% of the Albanian population supported NATO membership.

== Negotiation progress ==
Event	Date
Partnership for Peace	1994-02-23
Membership Action Plan	1999-04-12
Invitation to join	2008-04-03
Accession protocol	2008-07-09
Ratification by:
Belgium	2009-01-29
Bulgaria	2008-10-23
Canada	2009-01-14
Czech Republic	2008-12-22
Denmark	2008-12-09
Estonia	2008-12-19
France	2009-02-04
Germany	2008-12-19
Greece	2009-02-17
Hungary	2008-09-15
Iceland	2009-02-12
Italy	2008-12-23
Latvia	2008-09-18
Lithuania	2008-10-06
Luxembourg	2009-02-12
Netherlands	2009-02-17
Norway	2008-11-24
Poland	2008-10-21
Portugal	2009-02-13
Romania	2008-10-21
Slovakia	2008-10-24
Slovenia	2009-02-09
Spain	2008-12-18
Turkey	2008-11-26
United Kingdom	2008-12-19
United States	2008-09-26
Member of NATO	2009-04-01

== North Atlantic Cooperation Council ==
After the fall of the Soviet Union in 1991, NATO created the North Atlantic Cooperation Council (NACC) to strengthen institutional cooperation on the political and security issues between NATO members and former Warsaw Pact countries. Albania joined in 1992.

== Partnership for Peace ==
Partnership for Peace (PfP) is a NATO program aimed at creating trust between NATO and other states in Europe and the former Soviet Union. Albania signed the Partnership for Peace agreement 23 February 1994.

It was on this same day, 23 February, that Albania first officially applied to join NATO.

== Membership Action Plan ==
NATO Membership Action Plans (MAP) are designed to assist aspiring partner countries meet NATO standards and prepare for possible future membership. Aspiring nations must first participate in MAP before they join the alliance. The Membership Action Plan (MAP) will remain the vehicle to keep aspirants' progress under review.

Albania received a MAP in 1999.

== Bucharest summit accession protocols ==
At the 2008 NATO Bucharest summit, NATO member states signed accession protocols for Albania and Croatia. A signing ceremony was held, and witnessed by the foreign ministers of the two countries. Individual NATO member states must ratify the protocols according to their national requirements and procedures. NATO hoped to have it completed by the next NATO summit in April 2009.

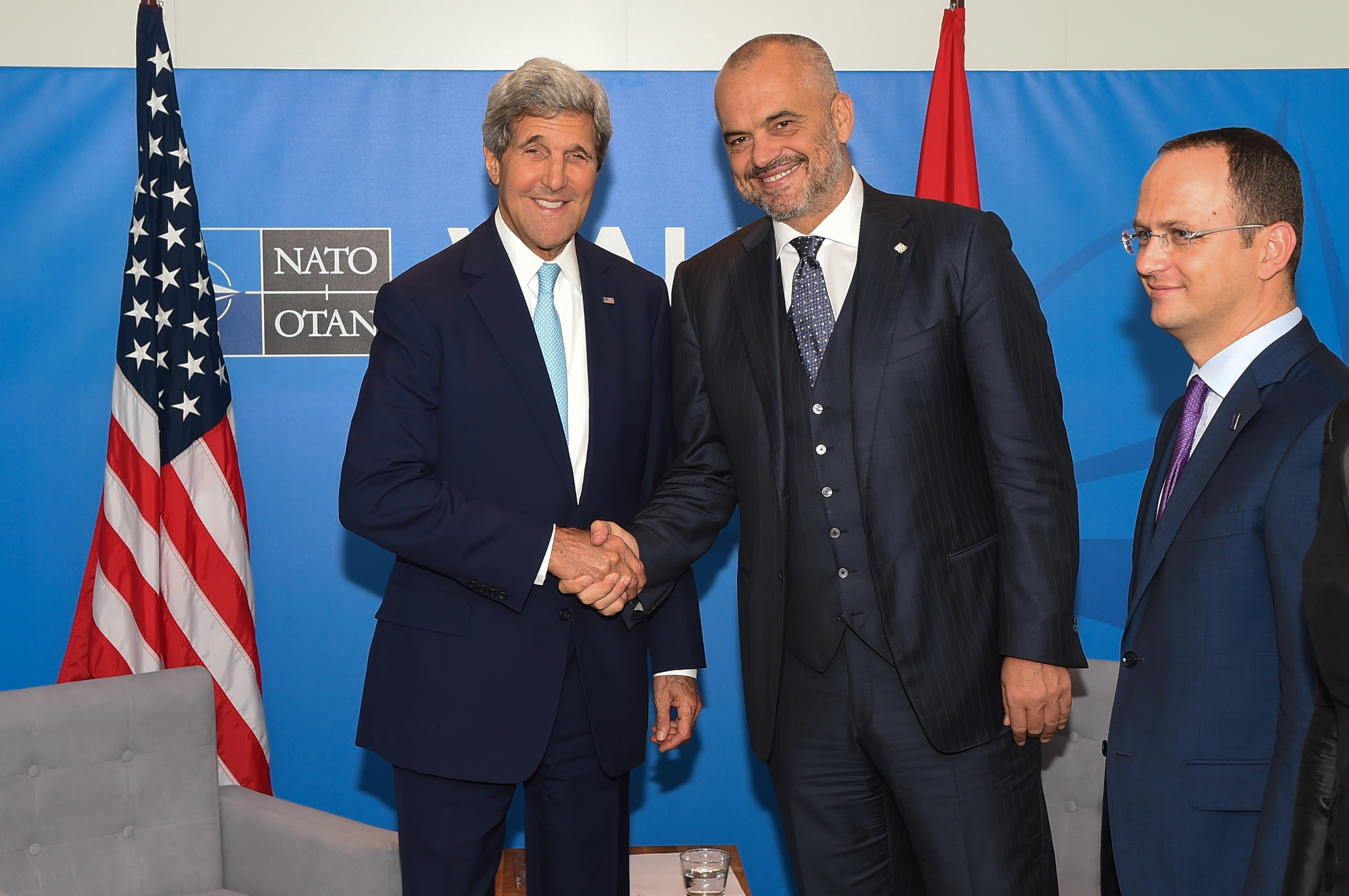
Secretary Kerry Shakes Hands With Albanian Prime Minister Rama Before Bilateral Meeting at NATO Summit in Wales

== Kuçovë Air Base ==
In August 2018, Prime Minister of Albania, Edi Rama announced that NATO plans to build its first air base in the Western Balkans near the municipality of Kuçovë in south-central Albania. Also, officials are discussing with the US and the alliance on "modernizing Albanian air capacities". The first phase of the project, which was expected to have commenced by the end of 2018 will have an estimated cost of 50 million euros.

== Pashaliman Naval Base ==
On 26 May 2022, Prime Minister Rama publicly offered NATO a naval base as an "added value" to the alliance "in these dangerous times", referring to the ongoing Russian invasion of Ukraine, which the Albanian government has formally denounced. The Pashaliman naval base, located in Vlorë Bay 180 kilometers (110 miles) south of the capital Tirana, was built in the 1950s by the Soviet Union and had sheltered up to 12 submarines. In the years following the end of the Cold War, it was neglected and looted before being renovated by Turkey; it is currently used by some military ships patrolling the Adriatic and Ionian seas. Rama announced that a project was already planned to further rehabilitate the base. The Associated Press reported that the offer was also intended to highlight Albania's contributions to NATO despite its small size.

== Representatives ==
No.	Name	Term served	
1	Artur Kuko	2009	5 December 2013
2	Leonard Demi	5 December 2013	5 December 2017
3	Visho Ajazi	5 December 2017	Incumbent

== Albania's foreign relations with NATO member states ==
- Belgium
- Bulgaria
- Canada
- Croatia
- Czech Republic
- Denmark
- Estonia
- Finland
- France
- Germany
- Greece
- Hungary
- Iceland
- Italy
- Latvia
- Lithuania
- Luxembourg
- Montenegro
- Netherlands
- North Macedonia
- Norway
- Poland
- Portugal
- Romania
- Slovakia
- Slovenia
- Spain
- Sweden
- Turkey
- United Kingdom
- United States

== See also ==
- Croatia–NATO relations
- Foreign relations of Albania
- Accession of Albania to the European Union
