= Albania–Romania relations =

- Albania: Romania

Albania–Romania relations are the bilateral relations between Albania and Romania. Albania has an embassy in Bucharest and Romania an embassy in Tirana and a consulate in Korçë. Notably, Romania was the first country to recognize Albania's independence. On 16 December 2013, a celebration was held in Romania celebrating the hundredth anniversary of the establishment of diplomatic relations between the two nations.

The countries are both members of the North Atlantic Treaty Organization, Organization of the Black Sea Economic Cooperation, La Francophonie and the Organization for Security and Co-operation in Europe. As an EU member, Romania supports the Accession of Albania to the EU.

== History ==
=== Modern ===
The Rilindja Kombëtare movement of Albanian nationalism inside the Ottoman Empire was present and prolific in Wallachia, the center of cultural initiatives taken by Dora d'Istria, Naim Frashëri, Jani Vreto, and Naum Veqilharxhi (the latter published the first ever Albanian primer in Bucharest, in 1844). Aleksandër Stavre Drenova, a resident of Bucharest, authored the lyrics of Albania's national anthem, Hymni i Flamurit, which is sung to the tune of "Pe-al nostru steag e scris Unire", composed by the Romanian Ciprian Porumbescu.

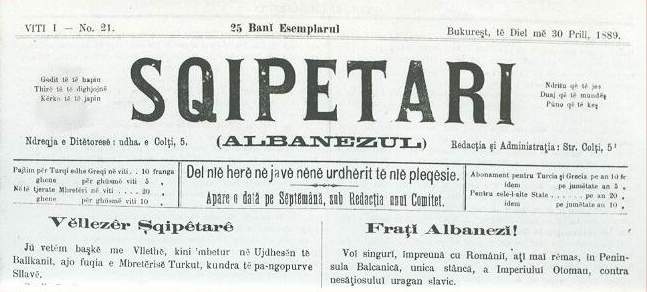
The newspaper Sqipetari/Albanezul, published by the Albanian community (1889)

Among the new groups of immigrants from various Balkan regions to Romania were the families of poets Victor Eftimiu and Lasgush Poradeci. At the time, the independence movement gathered momentum, and, for a while after 1905, was focused on the activities of Albert Gjika. An Albanian school was opened in 1905 in the city of Constanța — among its pupils was poet Aleksandër Stavre Drenova. In 1912, at a Bucharest meeting headed by Ismail Qemali and attended by Drenova, the first resolution regarding Albania's independence was adopted. In 1921, the first translation of the Qur'an into Albanian was completed by Ilo Mitkë Qafëzezi and published in the city of Ploiești.

In the late Ottoman period, some Albanian intellectuals developed a historico-political theory that the Albanians and the Vlachs, including modern Romanians, were "blood-brothers", and should fight for mutual liberation in the still Ottoman-administered territories with assistance from Romania or Italy. This view came to be supported by Austro-Hungary after 1897. Visar Dodani ran a newspaper in Bucharest from 1897 onward, and beginning in March 1898, it advocated a view of the common Illyrian origin of Albanians and Romanians, and their shared contemporary struggle.

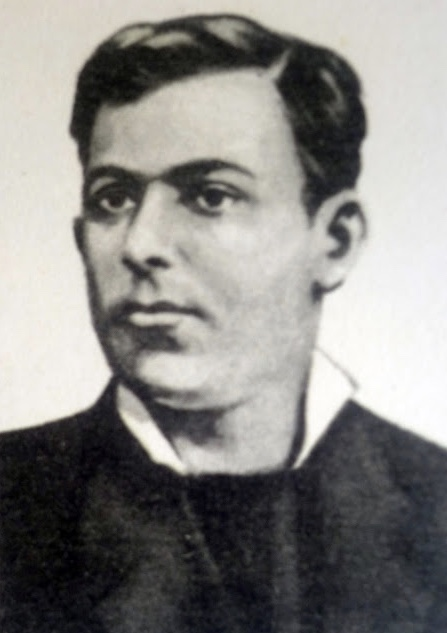
Visar Dodani

Romania was the first country to recognize Albania's independence. Relations between Albania and Romania were established on December 16, 1913. Since then, the two countries developed strong cultural and linguistic ties. The Albanian writer and poet Lasgush Poradeci lived and studied in Romania for some time, along with other influential Albanian figures. A treaty of friendship was signed between the two countries in 1994.

The St. Sotir Church in Korçë, serving the Aromanian community of the town, was built between 1995 and 2005 with support from the Romanian state. It was first built in the early 20th century but was demolished by the Albanian communist regime in 1959.

== Relations ==
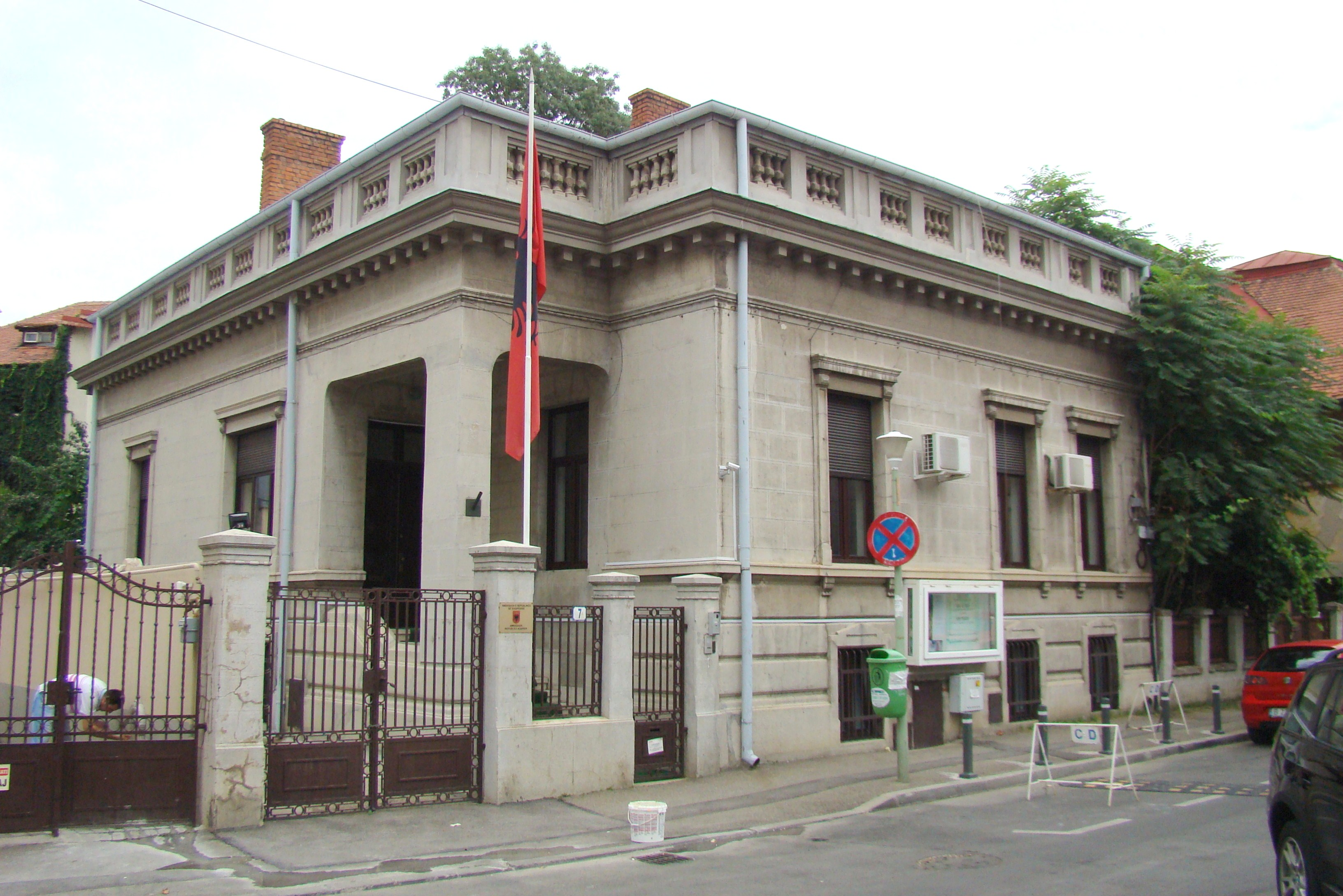
Embassy of Albania in Bucharest

On March 18, 2014, Edi Rama, the prime minister of Albania, met with Victor Ponta, the prime Minister of Romania, during the latter's first official visit to Tirana. The two discussed expanding ties between the two countries economically, in terms education (with a number of Albanian students studying in Romania and Albanian Police officers being trained by Romanians), as well as sharing Romania's experience in ascending to the European Union with Albania. They also discussed Romanian businesses opening offices in Tirana to increase economic cooperation, and training of Albanian police officers by Romania to combat organized crime. In February 2015, Ponta offered to make an energy deal with Romania. He also stated that expansion of cooperation in other fields will continue as well.

== Economic relations ==
Both countries entered into a free trade agreement which came into force on 1 January 2017.

The value of bilateral trade on 2016 was 83 million euros.

== International organizations ==
While Romania joined the EU in 2007, Albania is an candidate country, and a Romania joined NATO in 2004, Albania joined in 2009. At the NATO summit held in Bucharest, Romania, in 2008, NATO member countries reached an agreement on the accession of Albania and Croatia to the alliance. Following a meeting with Lindita Nikolla, the Speaker of the Parliament of Albania, on 13 December 2021, Romanian Ambassador to Albania, Octavian Serban, emphasized Romania's readiness to continue supporting the European integration of Albania and the Western Balkan countries.

== Diplomacy ==
Republic of Albania

- Bucharest (Embassy)

Republic of Romania

- Tirana (Embassy)

== See also ==
- Foreign relations of Albania
- Foreign relations of Romania
- Accession of Albania to the EU
- NATO-EU relations
- Romania's reaction to the 2008 Kosovo declaration of independence
- Albanian–Romanian linguistic relationship
