= Dodani =

Dodani is a surname. Notable people with the surname include:

- Nik Dodani (born 1993), American actor, writer and comedian
- Visar Dodani (1857–1939), Albanian journalist and activist
