= Albania–North Macedonia relations =

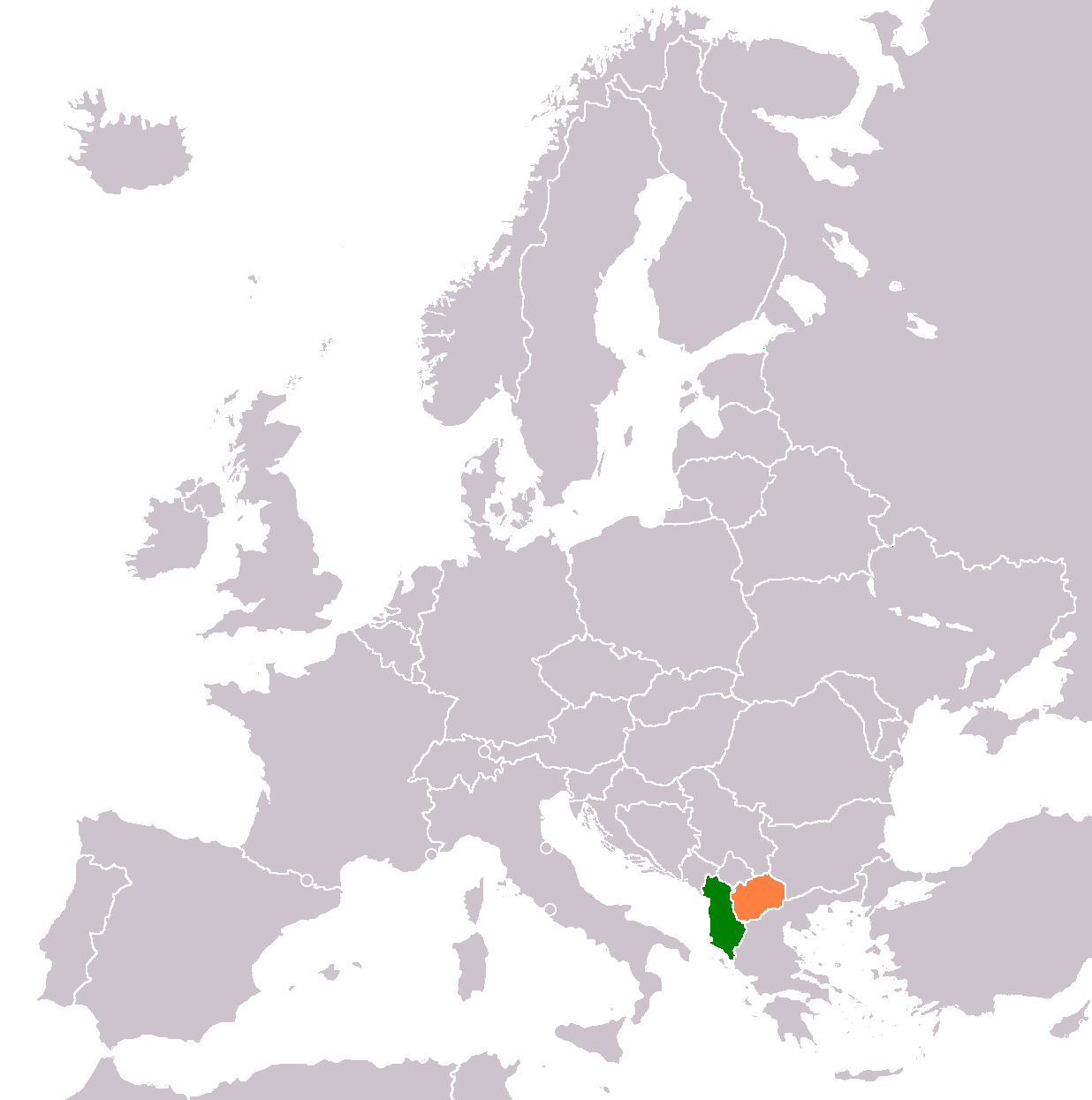

- Albania: North Macedonia

Albania and North Macedonia maintain diplomatic relations. Both countries are full members of the Council of Europe and of NATO. Both began European Union accession negotiations in March 2020. The Albanian language is the official language of Albania, while also being co-official with the Macedonian language in North Macedonia on the state level, and on the municipal level, if the ethnic Albanian population exceeds 20%. Ethnic Albanians make up the second largest community in North Macedonia.

== History ==
Albanians in North Macedonia are of interest to Albania. In the 1990s, issues revolving around the Albanian community fueled concerns in Albania of destabilisation in the new Macedonian state and possible Serbian intervention. Albania, through President Sali Berisha became one of the early states to recognise Macedonia in April 1993. The country was recognised by Albania under the United Nations (UN) provisional reference of the "former Yugoslav Republic of Macedonia", abbreviated as FYROM.

Berisha viewed the existence of an independent Macedonia as important to Albanian interests in keeping apart Greece and Serbia (then part of FR Yugoslavia), and to preventing any possible encirclement of Albania. At the time, the close relationship between Greece and Serbia was a motivation for Berisha to seek close bilateral relations with Macedonia, in addition to political and economic matters. Berisha's recognition move resulted in criticism within Albania by the political opposition for not extracting concessions over the status of the Albanian minority in Macedonia. For Berisha, his position was that "an independent Macedonia is better than a Macedonia under Miloševič". Greece delivered a strongly worded reply regarding Albanian recognition and was displeased over the action.

Separatist sentiments among Albanians in Macedonia were dissuaded by Albania in the aim of further stabilising Macedonia. Berisha attempted through limited influence to encourage the Albanian minority to engage with the Macedonian political system and to place their efforts toward stabilising the country. During the early years of the Macedonia naming dispute, Macedonia was under economic embargo by Greece. Greece suggested the name "Slavomacedonia" as a solution and Berisha, alongside other Albanians in the wider region strongly opposed Macedonia adopting that name. Albania gave its support to Macedonia through offering its transport and port infrastructure for use. Unlike Berisha, the stances of the political opposition Socialist Party and Democratic Alliance closely resembled the Greek position on the Macedonian naming dispute. They both criticised the policy platform of the Albanian government toward Macedonia as "tolerant and often irresponsible". Issues over the position and handling of the Albanian community in the Macedonian state continued to hamper the ability of both countries leadership to create good relations.

In mid June 1993, a border incident occurred. A meeting was organised by the Macedonian side that later ended in the death of a senior Albanian border guard intelligence officer after Macedonian border guards shot him. The officer's military attache managed to return to Tirana and reported the incident that according to sources from western militaries, the event almost sparked a war between both countries. Other border incidents occurred and the European Union (EU) sent monitors to Albania and stationed them on its side of the border. Other events such as the alleged involvement of Albanian elites in Macedonia in a paramilitary and weapons scandal and support for a radical group within the Party for Democratic Prosperity (PDP) party resulted in bilateral tensions. Macedonia criticised Albania for its evolving position and accused it of interfering in its domestic affairs. The US intervened and pressed Albania to repair ties with Macedonia. Berisha later restrained the radical wing of the PDP and undertook actions to mend disagreements and increase ties with its neighbour.

A summit between President Berisha and Macedonian President Kiro Gligorov was held in May 1994 over infrastructure cooperation, minority issues and bolstering bilateral relations. Macedonian leadership positively viewed the summit and there were initial moves to enhance relations. Later, some statements by Macedonian officials indicated that the country would not undertake major changes toward the Albanian minority in order to improve ties with Albania. In Macedonia, officials were of the view that Albania was in a weak position, due to tensions in its relations with Greece and Serbia. Macedonia's admission into European organisations and a lessening of tensions in the name dispute with Greece gave it minimal incentive to seek closer relations with Albania.

In February 1995, an attempt was made to open an Albanian university in Macedonia and the move was halted by police. Albania officially declared that the university situation may incline it to "reconsider" policy regarding its neighbour. There was pressure directed to the government of Albania by internal political forces to react strongly, however, though displeased with events its response was restrained. Toward late 1996, internal political issues restricted Albania and Macedonia from making attempts to further develop bilateral relations.

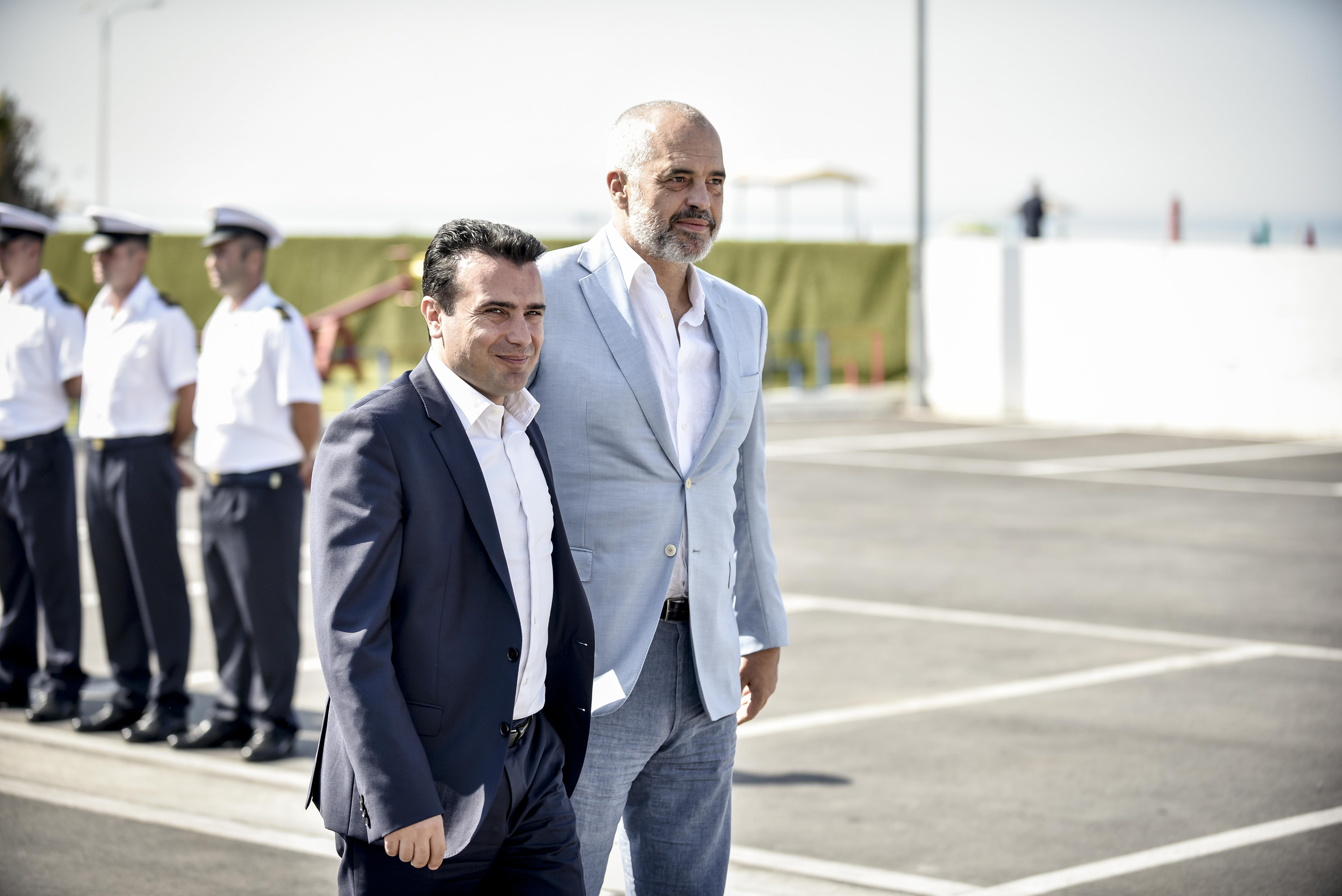
Zoran Zaev and Edi Rama attending a summit in Durrës, Albania, 26 August 2017

After an earthquake struck Albania (26 November 2019), North Macedonia sent €100,000 in financial aid, as well as drones with thermal cameras to search for survivors under the rubble. Rescue teams were also sent, as well as mechanical equipment to clear the rubble.

In December 2023 at the National History Museum in Tirana, Albanian officials returned 20 stolen cultural icons to North Macedonia that had been taken about 10 years previous, representing years of international cooperation against trafficking of art objects.

== Resident diplomatic missions ==
- Albania has an embassy in Skopje.
- North Macedonia has an embassy in Tirana.

== See also ==
- Foreign relations of Albania
- Foreign relations of North Macedonia
- Accession of Albania to the European Union
- Accession of North Macedonia to the European Union
- Albania–NATO relations
- North Macedonia–NATO relations
- Albanians in North Macedonia
- Macedonians in Albania
- Albania–Yugoslavia relations
