= Albanians in Belgium =

Albanians in Belgium Shqiptarët në Belgjikë
Total population
- ca. 50,000 - 60,000

Regions with significant populations
- Widespread

Languages
- Albanian (Tosk, Gheg, Arbëresh dialects) (native) Dutch, French, German, English (working languages) Italian, Greek, Macedonian, Serbo-Croatian, Turkish (additional languages)

Religion
- Islam, Christianity, Irreligious

Albanians in Belgium (Albanian: Shqiptarët në Belgjikë; Dutch: Albanezen in België; French: Albanais en Belgique; German: Albaner in Belgien) are Albanians that live in Belgium or are Belgians of Albanian descent. They number up to 60,000 people in Belgium. The vast majority emigrated from Serbia, Kosovo, Montenegro, North Macedonia and Albania.

== History ==
On August 1, 1956, the train carrying 700 refugees from southeastern European communist countries arrived at the Seille station in Namur province. These refugees have traveled for 72 hours and among them were hundreds of refugees from Albania. This marks the first wave of Albanian exiles in Belgium. The first wave of Albanian exiles was so-called "elite". The emigrants came mainly from northern Albania, were relatively educated and opposed the communist dictatorship of Enver Hoxha seeking freedom. Albanian political refugees have been welcomed in Belgium and adapted well. In 1968 Skanderbeg Monument was built in Schaerbeek, with money collected from Albanian Diaspora in Belgium and America.

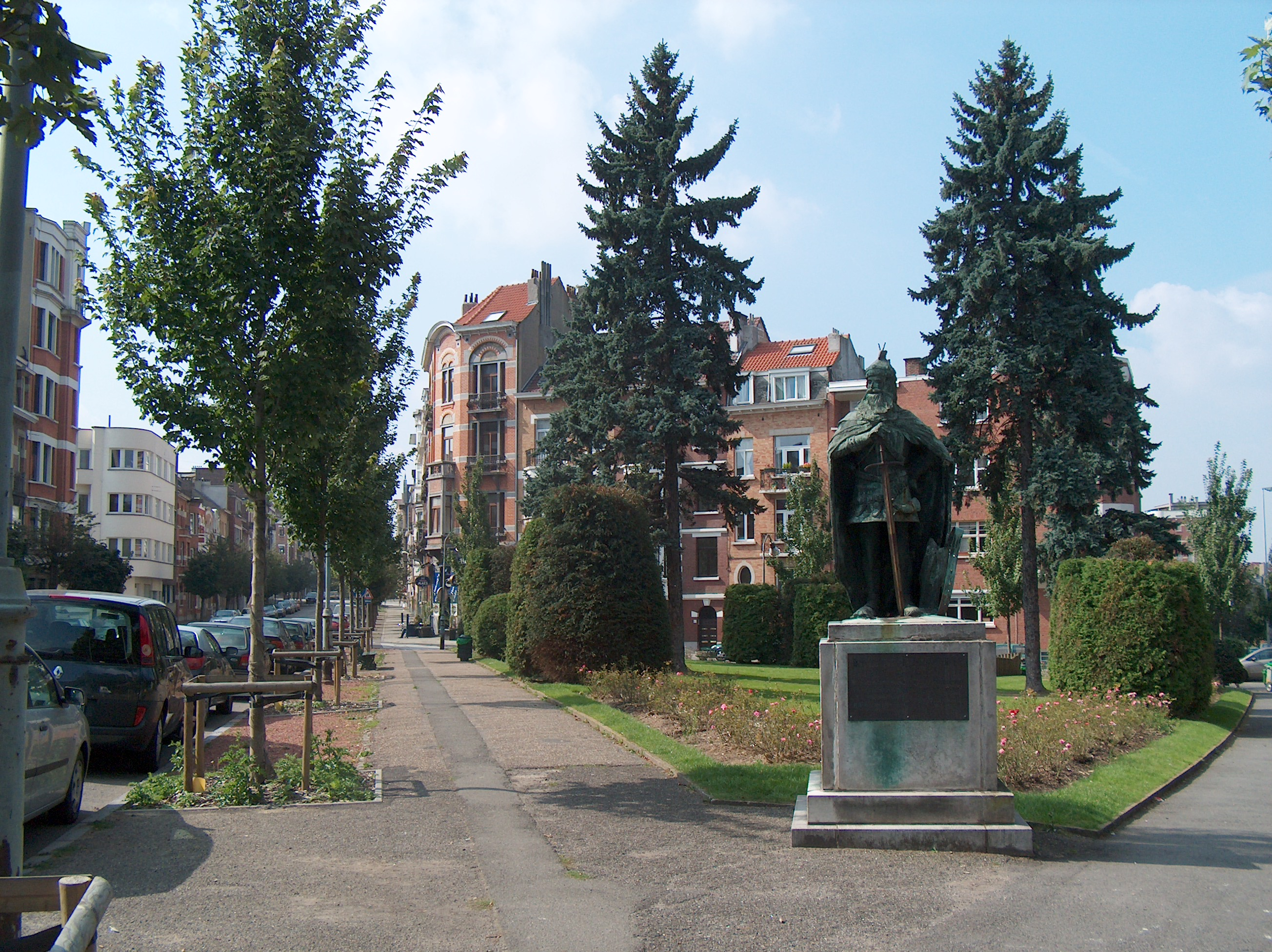
Statue of Skanderbeg in Schaerbeek, Brussels.

In the 1960s, with immigrants from Turkey, Albanians, who had previously migrated from Yugoslavia to Turkey, came to Belgium. They were followed by guest workers from Yugoslavia in the 1970s and strengthened in the 1980s.

This first wave of exiles will be followed by the large influx of Kosovo Albanians beginning in the late 1970s and intensified in the 1990s as a result of Serbian repression over Kosovo Albanians. This influx will culminate when Belgrade will massacre over thousands of Albanian civilians and drive out nearly a million Kosovo Albanians in v. Also in the 1990s, a second wave of exiles came from Albania after the collapse of the communist regime. Hundreds of thousands of Albanians, disconnected from the world for 45 years, fleeing poverty in Albania, rush especially to Italy and Greece, but also to Belgium.

== Demographics ==
In addition to Albanian citizens (7,518 people per 2026), there are also numerous Albanians from Kosovo (5,147 people per 2026), North Macedonia, Serbia, Greece, Montenegro or Italy. Therefore, it is generally difficult to give an exact number of ethnic Albanians in Belgium.

== Notable people ==
=== Politics ===
- Krenar Gashi - Political scientist

=== Sports ===
- Adnan Januzaj - Belgian professional footballer who plays as a winger for Spanish club Sevilla and the Belgium national team
- Lindon Selahi - Albanian professional footballer
- Adrian Bakalli - Belgian former professional footballer
- Medjon Hoxha - Belgian professional footballer
- Rustemi Kreshnik - Albanian-Belgian kickboxer
- Sebastjan Spahiu - professional footballer
- Din Sula - professional footballer
- Toni Aliaj - professional footballer
- Daniel Dardha - Belgian chess grandmaster
- Geralb Smajli - Albanian-Belgian professional footballer

=== Media ===
- Bleri Lleshi - Albanian philosopher and public speaker

== See also ==
- Albania–Belgium relations
- Albanian diaspora
- Albanian mafia in Belgium
- Immigration to Belgium
- Albanians in France
- Albanians in Germany
- Albanians in Luxembourg
- Albanians in the Netherlands
