= Albania–Poland relations =

- Albania: Poland

Albania–Poland relations are diplomatic relations between the Republic of Albania and the Republic of Poland. Poland was the first Slavic nation to recognize Kosovo as an independent entity, however the relationship between the two nations is lower than usual. Nonetheless, the two countries have been working closer since the fall of communism at 1989 and there has been strong renewal of relationship between two nations.

Stanislaw Zuber, a mid 20th century Polish geologist, was the author of the first extensive geological map of Albania, which is still in use throughout Albania today. The first telegraph line from North Albania to Istanbul, as well as the first to Manastir, was also constructed by Poles.

After Albania split from the Soviet bloc, Albanian-Polish relations came to a halt; after the fall of communism, however, they were resuscitated with considerable contribution by the foundation of the Albanian-Polish Friendship Society, which was created by Albanians who had studied abroad in Poland. Today, the shared experience of communist rule is a source of shared "understanding".

In 2016, the first economic forum between Poland and Albania was held.

On 26 November 2019, an earthquake struck Albania. At the request of the Albanian government, Poland in late December sent 4 firefighter teams to the country and 500 field beds in earthquake aid. Poland joined the EU in 2004, while Albania is a candidate for EU accession.

== Kosovo ==
Kosovo, a region where Albanians form the majority, declared its independence from Serbia on 17 February 2008 and Poland recognized it on 26 February 2008. While Albania was one of the earliest nations to recognize Kosovo due to common culture, Poland was the first Slavic country to do so. However, in September 2008, President of Poland, Lech Kaczyński, stated that the original cause of the 2008 South Ossetia war was not the Georgian operation, but the recognition of Kosovo's independence and that he would block attempts to establish diplomatic relations of Poland with Kosovo at ambassadorial level; however, the government has not proposed to send an ambassador to Pristina.

Nonetheless, Poland had (as of July 2009) 274 troops serving in Kosovo as peacekeepers in the NATO-led Kosovo Force. Originally there were 800 Polish troops in KFOR.

== Cooperation in the Baltic ==
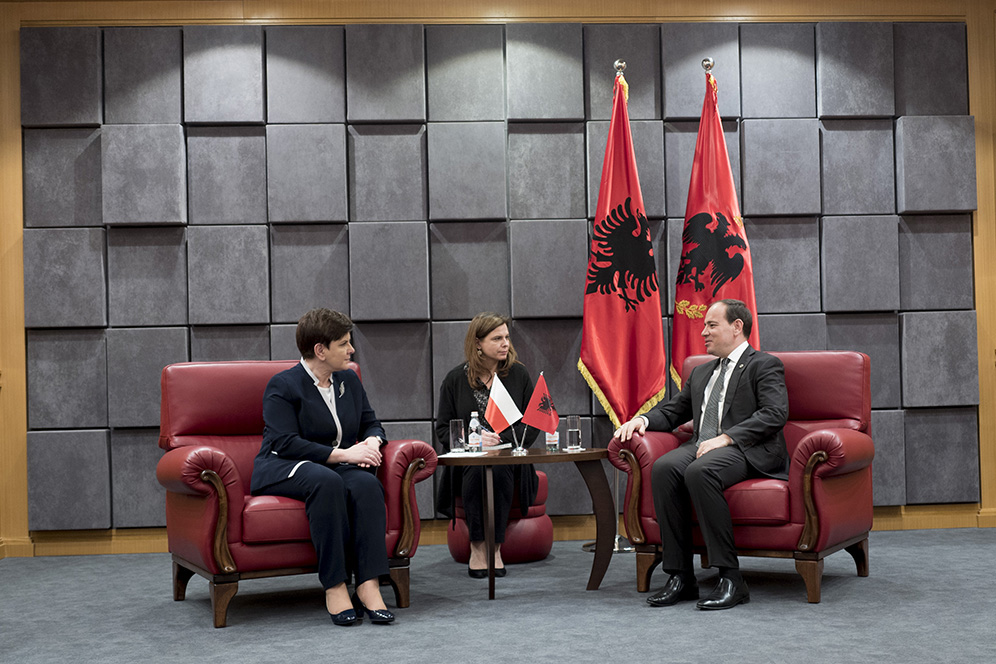
Albanian President Bujar Nishani meets with the Polish Prime Minister, Beata Szydło in Tirana. (9 December 2016)

In the events following the increased tension resulting from the situation in Ukraine, Albania and Poland have both deployed their soldiers as part of a "battle group" in Latvia.

== EU accession ==
Poland is a strong supporter of Albania's accession to the EU. In a bilateral meeting, Jacek Czaputowicz stated:

Poland strongly supports Albania's membership of the EU... We believe that the people of Albania should receive a clear message that the EU is open and awaits Albania, and that this membership would make the EU more culturally rich... We appreciate the Albanian government's reform efforts; we are happy that they were noticed by the European Commission, whose report last April made an unconditional recommendation for the Council of the European Union to open accession negotiations

— Jacek Czaputowicz, Bilateral meeting between Poland and Albania

On May 7, 2018, Czaputowicz stressed the importance of "solidarity" between Eastern European countries, noting that "the Western Balkans are undergoing a similar developmental path as Poland" and thus "have similar interests".

On July 5, 2019, Polish head of state Andrzej Duda "scolded" the EU in a summit as Poznań for delaying membership talks for Albania and North Macedonia, stating "The European Union shouldn't treat countries this way when they are carrying out difficult reforms aimed at future integration".

== Economic ties ==
Albania has emerged as a major tourist destination for Poles, with the number of Polish tourists doubling in 2016 to reach 116,000; Poland is in the top 10 sources of foreign tourists in Albania. For the first eleven months of 2018, that number had grown to stand at 152,000.

== Resident diplomatic missions ==
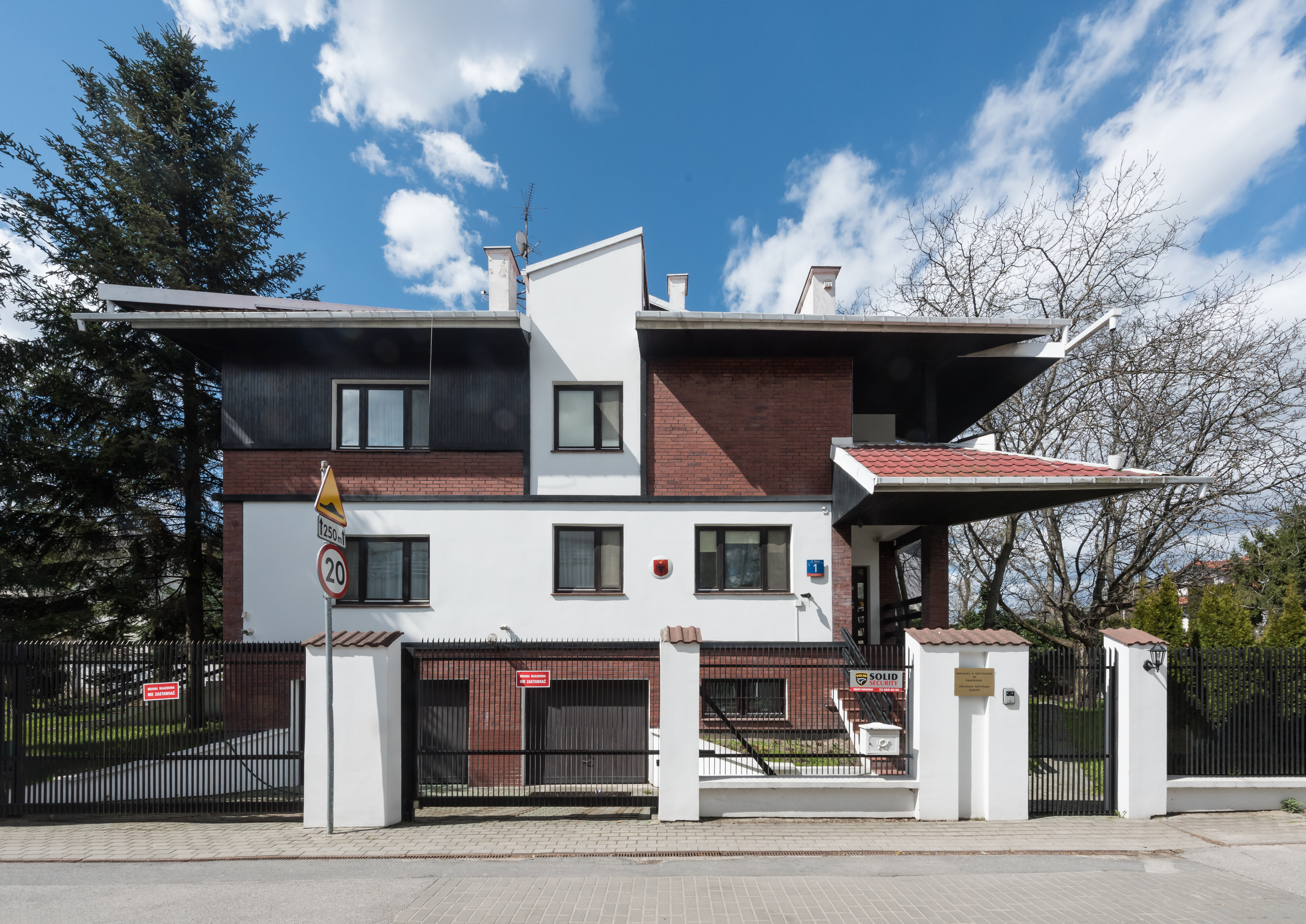
Embassy of Albania in Warsaw

- Albania has an embassy in Warsaw.
- Poland has an embassy in Tirana.

== See also ==
- Foreign relations of Albania
- Foreign relations of Poland
- Accession of Albania to the EU
- NATO-EU relations
- Polish–Ukrainian Peace Force Battalion
- Albanians in Poland
