= Albania–Czech Republic relations =

- Albania: Czech Republic

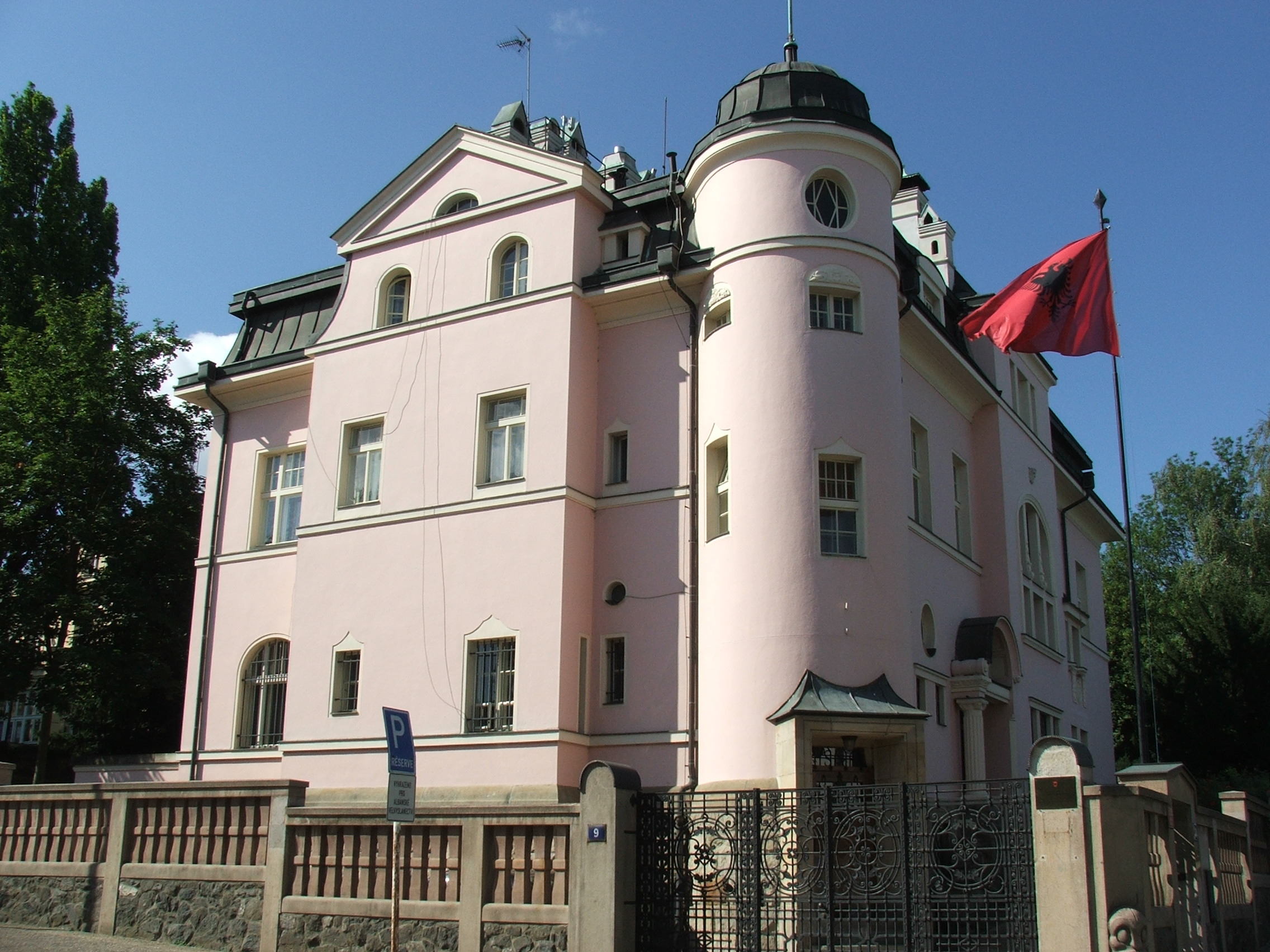
Albanian Embassy in Prague

Albania and the Czech Republic established diplomatic relations on 5 July 1922. Albania has an embassy in Prague and the Czech Republic has an embassy in Tirana. Both countries are members of Council of Europe, OSCE and NATO. Albania is an EU candidate and the Czech Republic is an EU member.

== Trade ==
In 2023, Albania exported $69.8M to Czechia—mainly insulated wire, men's suits, and leather footwear—while Czechia exported $117M to Albania, including rolled tobacco, cars, and cleaning products. Over the past five years, Albanian exports to Czechia grew at an annualized rate of 7.92%, and Czech exports to Albania increased by 18%.

== High level visits ==
In March 2025, the Minister of Foreign Affairs of the Czech Republic, Jan Lipavský paid a working visit to Albania where he met Albannian Minister for Europe and Foreign Relations, Igli Hasani.

== Resident diplomatic missions ==
- Albania has an embassy in Prague.
- The Czech Republic has an embassy in Tirana.

== See also ==
- Foreign relations of Albania
- Foreign relations of the Czech Republic
- Accession of Albania to the EU
- NATO-EU relations
