= Albanians in the Netherlands =

Albanians in the Netherlands Albanezen in Nederland Shqiptarët në Holandë
Regions with significant populations
- Amsterdam · Rotterdam · Utrecht

Languages
- Dutch, Albanian

Religion
- Islam, Christianity, Irreligious

Albanians in the Netherlands (Dutch: Albanezen in Nederland; Albanian: Shqiptarët në Holandë) number up to 12,000 people. The vast majority emigrated from Kosovo and North Macedonia.

== Demographics ==
There is no exact answer to the number of ethnic Albanians in Netherlands. According to the Diaspora Ministry of the Republic of Albania, Netherlands has one of the best conditions for the Albanian diaspora. According to the Kosovo-Albanian Diaspora Ministry, there are about 60,000 ethnic Albanians living in the Netherlands. It is estimated that 20,000 Kosovo Albanians have emigrated to the Netherlands since the 1999 Kosovo war.

== Notable people ==
=== Arts and entertainment ===
- Alban Ramosaj – Dutch singer, songwriter, record producer and model

=== Sport ===
- Rezar – Dutch professional wrestler
- Albian Muzaqi – Dutch professional footballer
- Shkodran Metaj – Dutch footballer
- Destan Bajselmani – Dutch footballer
- Arian Kastrati – Dutch footballer

== See also ==
- Albania–Netherlands relations
- Albanian mafia in the Netherlands
- Albanian diaspora
- Immigration to the Netherlands
- Albanians in Belgium
- Albanians in France
- Albanians in Germany
