= Albania–Portugal relations =

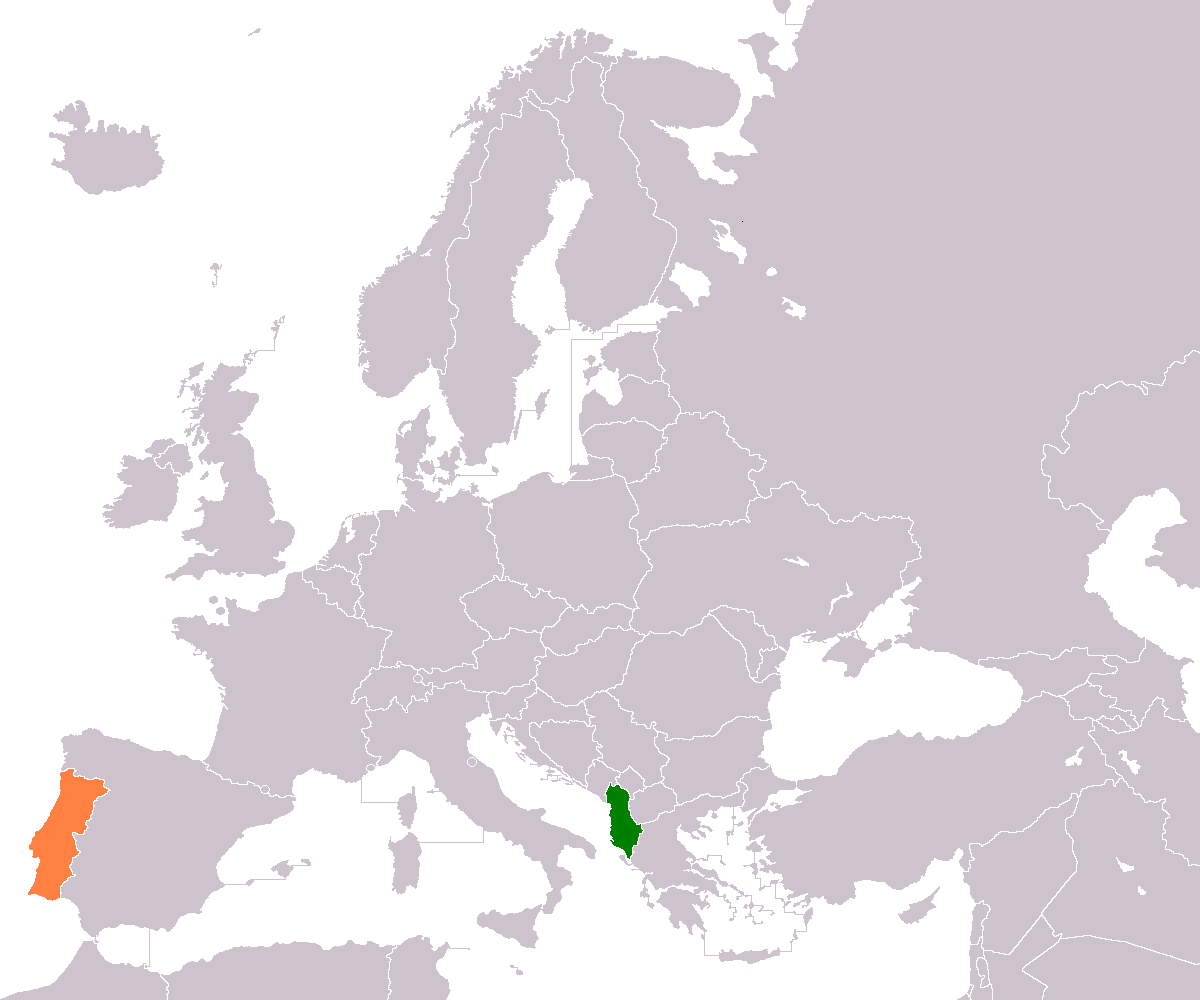
- Albania: Portugal

Albania had an embassy in Lisbon. Portugal has an honorary consulate in Tirana. The history of diplomatic relations between Albania and Portugal dates back to 1922, when Portugal recognized Albania's independence on May 25, 1922.

The countries are both members of the North Atlantic Treaty Organization, Council of Europe and Organization for Security and Co-operation in Europe. As a EU member, Portugal supports Accession of Albania to the EU.

== Economic relations ==
In 2010, the bilateral Chamber of Commerce and Industry Cusmara de Comércio e Industria Luso Albanesa was founded. In 2016, Portugal exported a carriage worth of 6.10 million euros (compared to 2012 only 2.16 million euros) to Albania. 31.8% of the products were chemical-pharmaceutical products mostly from the BIAL company, 19.2% agricultural products, 14.7% metal products, 13.3% paper and cellulose and 5.4% machinery and equipment.

== Cultural relations ==
The Luso-Albanian Foundation, Luso-Illyrian Institute for Human Development (iLIDH) founded in 2007, is considered one of the major cultural bilateral relationships between Albania and Portugal. The foundation initiates and supports a variety of projects in education, culture, sciences, research and development cooperation, particularly in administration and organization management. In 2012, an office was opened in Tirana. There are also offices in Prague and Brussels.

== Diplomatic missions ==
Neither country has a resident ambassador.

- Albania is accredited to Portugal from its embassy in Paris.
- Portugal is accredited to Albania from its embassy in Rome.

== High level visits ==
- From February 2nd to the 4th, 2000, the Minister of Foreign Affairs of Albania, Paskal Milo, visited Portugal.
- On June 12th, 2007, the Minister of Foreign Affairs of Albania, Lulzim Basha, visited Portugal.
- On November 14th, 2007, the Minister of Foreign Affairs of Portugal, Luís Amado, visited Tirana.
- On February 6th, 2009, the Minister of Foreign Affairs of Albania, Lulzim Basha, visited Portugal, to ratify the Protocol of accession to NATO.
- On May 11th and 12th, 2010, the Vice-Prime Minister and Minister of Foreign Affairs, Ilir Meta, visited Lisbon.
- On November 19th and 20th, 2010, the Prime-Minister of Albania, Sali Berisha, was the head of the Albanian delegation to the Lisbon NATO Summit.
- On March 10th, 2015, the Secretary of State for European Affairs of Portugal, Bruno Maçães, visited Albania, where he met with the Minister of European Integration of Albania, Klajda Gjosha.
- On May 9th, 2016, the Minister of Foreign Affairs of Albania, Ditmir Bushati, carried out an official visit to Portugal.
- On July 25th, 2022, the Minister of Foreign Affairs of Portugal, João Gomes Cravinho, visited Tirana.

== Bilateral Agreements ==
- On September 11th, 1998, the Agreement between Portugal and Albania on the Mutual Promotion and Protection of Investments, and respective Protocol, was signed in Lisbon.
- On September 29th, 2014, the Protocol between Portugal and the Council of Ministers of Albania, regarding the Application of the Agreement of Readmission between the European Community and Albania, was signed in Lisbon.

== International organizations ==
Portugal became an EU member in 1986, whereas Albania is a candidate country. While Portugal is one of the founding members of NATO, Albania became a member in 2009.

== See also ==
- Foreign relations of Albania
- Foreign relations of Portugal
- Accession of Albania to the EU
