= Albania–Norway relations =

- Albania: Norway

Albania–Norway relations are the bilateral relations between Albania and Norway. Both countries are full members of the Council of Europe, Organization for Security and Co-operation in Europe and NATO. Albania handles its diplomatic representation to Norway through a non-resident ambassador based in Stockholm, Sweden. Conversely, Norway is represented in Albania via its non-resident ambassador located in Zagreb, Croatia.

== History ==
The history of diplomatic relations between Albania and Norway dates back to 29 May 1971, when the two countries officially established ties. Following the collapse of the communist regime in Albania, bilateral cooperation intensified. Norway emerged as a strong proponent of Albania's integration into Euro-Atlantic structures, actively supporting its successful bid for NATO membership and viewing Albania's regional foreign policy as a stabilizing influence in the Western Balkans.

== Mutual and economic relations ==
Norway, as a member state of the Schengen Area, supported Albania during its visa liberalization process with the Schengen zone. Although Norway is not a member of the European Union, it actively backs Albania's ongoing accession and integration efforts through development funding and cooperative assistance programs.

Economic ties between the two nations are anchored heavily by investments in renewable energy infrastructure. The Norwegian state-owned clean power enterprise Statkraft has undertaken significant direct capital investment in Albania's domestic hydroelectric sector.

== See also ==
- Foreign relations of Albania
- Foreign relations of Norway
- Albanians in Norway
- Friendship Association Norway–Albania
