= Albania–Finland relations =

- Albania: Finland

Albania–Finland relations are the bilateral relations between Albania and Finland. Both countries are full members of the Council of Europe, Organization for Security and Co-operation in Europe and NATO.

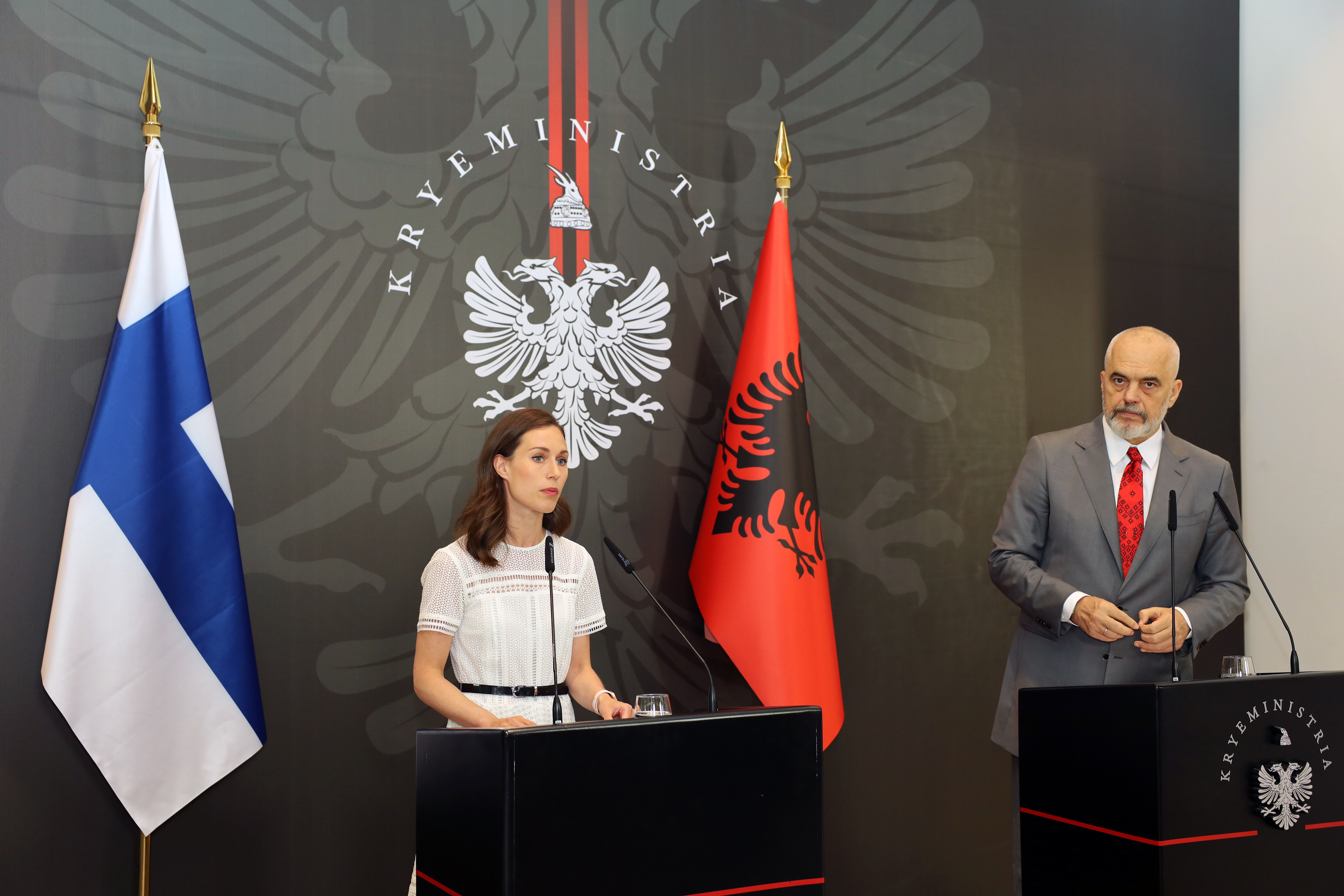
Prime Minister's Marin and Rama during an official visit in 2022.

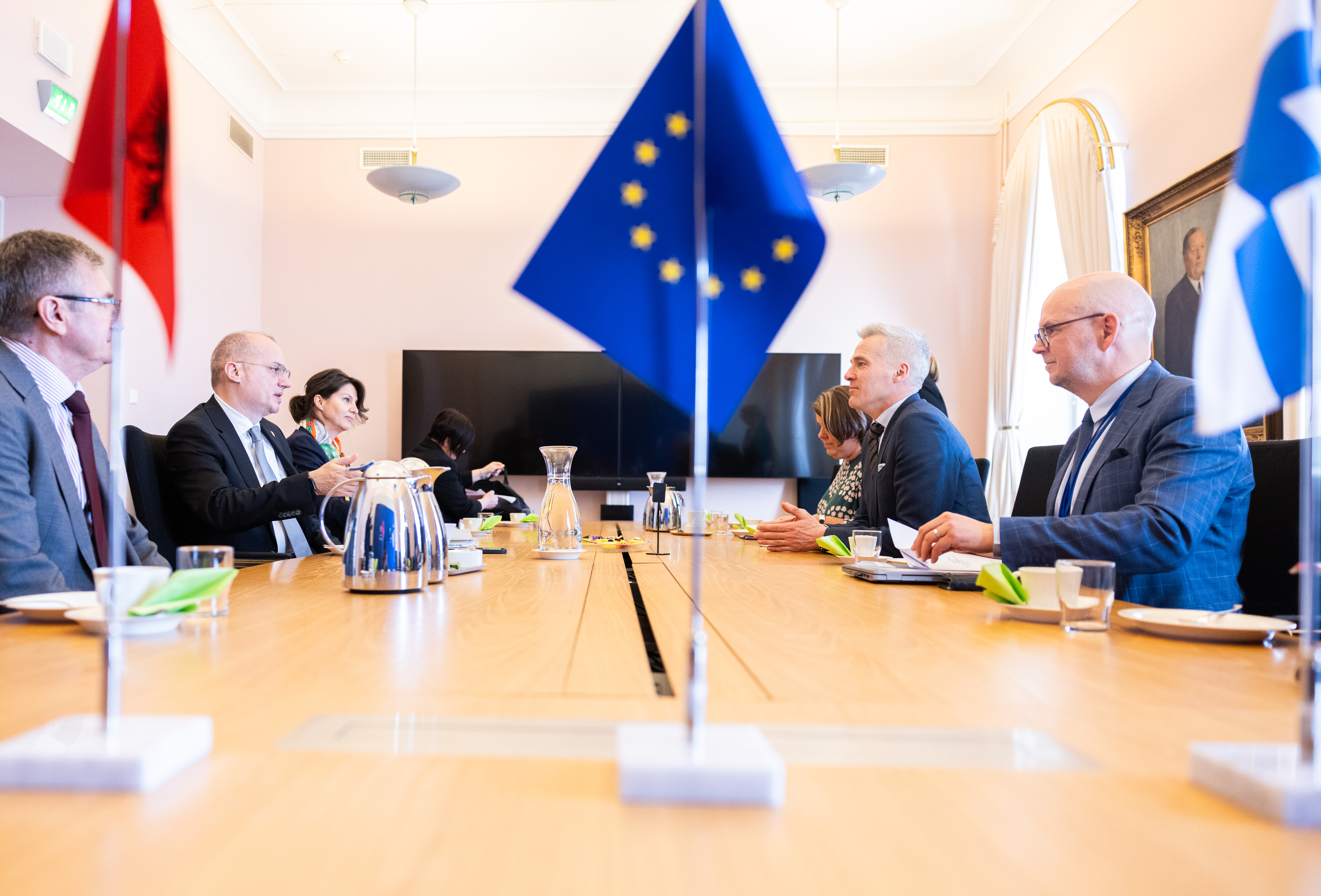
Minister for European Affairs Anders Adlercreutz and Minister for Foreign Affairs of Albania Igli Hasani during a meeting in Helsinki 12. June 2024

Finland supports Albania's European integration and relations intensified after the 2022 Russian invasion of Ukraine, with Albania fully supporting Finland's bid for joining NATO in 2022.

== History ==
Finland recognised Albania on 1 December 1928. Diplomatic relations established on 8 June 1956.

== High level visits ==
Secretary of State for the Ministry for Foreign Affairs of Finland, Peter Stenlund visited Albania in 2018.

In June 2022, Finnish Prime Minister Sanna Marin visited Albanian Prime Minister Edi Rama in Tirana.

In December 2022, Finnish Prime Minister Sanna Marin visited Tirana to attend the EU-Western Balkans summit.

== See also ==
- Foreign relations of Albania
- Foreign relations of Finland
- Accession of Albania to the EU
- NATO-EU relations
