= Albania–Sweden relations =

- Albania: Sweden

Albania–Sweden relations are the bilateral relations between Albania and Sweden. Albania has an embassy in Stockholm. Sweden has an embassy in Tirana. Both countries are full members of the Council of Europe, OSCE and NATO.

Sweden supports Accession of Albania to the EU and relations intensified after the 2022 Russian invasion of Ukraine, with Albania fully supporting Sweden's bid for joining NATO in 2022.

== History ==
Diplomatic relations were established on 20 June 1969.

== High level visits ==
In December 2022, Swedish Prime Minister Ulf Kristersson visited Tirana to attend the EU-Western Balkans summit.

== See also ==
- Foreign relations of Albania
- Foreign relations of Sweden
- Swedish–Albanian Association
