= Swedish–Albanian Association =

Albania friendship associations

The Swedish–Albanian Association (Swedish: Svensk-albanska föreningen) was a Swedish friendship association, founded during the Cold War to support the People's Socialist Republic of Albania and the Party of Labour of Albania, and to build Swedish–Albanian cultural relations. The group, among other activities, translated and published the works of Albanian leader Enver Hoxha — among them Imperialismen och revolutionen (1979) on the subject of the Sino-Albanian split — as well as books on Albanian culture, tourist guide books, and a novella by the author Dhimitër Shuteriqi. The Swedish-Albanian Association's Bulletin and Albania and Us were two regular publications.

Members of the group made several visits to Albania during the 1970s and 1980s, meeting with Albanian party officials and touring the country. One of the main activities of the association was the organizing of travels in Albania for Swedish, and even Danish and Finnish tourists. In early April 1976 the postal worker and member Bosse Jansson mysteriously disappeared, after attending an association meeting. Despite losing the basis of its existence with the fall of communism in Albania in 1990, the group continued to exist for some years, publishing a brochure in support of the Kosovo Albanians during the Kosovo War in 1999.

An organization using the name of the Swedish–Albanian Association still exists as of at least 2007, working primarily in propagating the issue of Kosovo, but it is unknown if it is a continuation of the original group.

== See also ==
- Albanians in Sweden
- Communist Party in Sweden
- Friendship Association Norway–Albania
- Hoxhaism
