= Albania–Netherlands relations =

- Albania: Netherlands

Diplomatic mission
- Albanian Embassy the Hague: Dutch Embassy; Tirana

Albania has an embassy in the Hague and the Netherlands has an embassy in Tirana.

The countries are both members of the North Atlantic Treaty Organization (NATO). Albania is a European Union candidate and the Netherlands is a European Union member state.

== History ==
Albania declared independence from the Ottoman Empire in November 1912, during the First Balkan War. The leading European powers of the time recognised Albania's independence at the 1913 London Peace Conference, where it was decided that the Dutch would take responsibility for internal security. This led to the Netherlands deploying military personnel to help set up the gendarmerie of the Provisional Government of Albania.

In 1946, the Netherlands called upon the United Nations Security Council to bring to a halt incidents along the northern border of Greece, involving the Socialist People's Republic of Albania, Yugoslavia, Greece and Bulgaria.

The Socialist People's Republic of Albania started their diplomatic relations with the Netherlands, and eight other Western European countries, in 1970.

In the early 1990s the socialist regime collapsed, and while Albania turned to democracy they had no previous experience of implementing it. This led to several years of social and political instability. The Netherlands was able to assist Albania by starting a skills building program in 1999. Groups of Albanian politicians and officials, from both national and local level, would attend the Hague for workshops with their Dutch peers where they discussed the practice of good governance and administration within the democratic framework.

== Accession of Albania to the EU ==
Generally being pro the accession of Albania to the European Union, the Netherlands has vetoed many times Albania's advancement, claiming lack of credible reforms, corruption situation and organized crime. In 2018 the European Commission released a progress report where it recommended the open of negotiations with Albania.

In May 2018, eight Dutch MPs from the main six political parties visited Tirana. At the end of their visit, they stated that fulfilling the five official conditions set by the European institutions is not enough to warrant opening EU accession negotiations. They declared that Albania needs to demonstrate the will to indict and prosecute crime and the corruption of high officials. They also claimed an increase of Albanian criminality in the Netherlands, which doesn't help the country's process of integration into the EU.

On 21 June, the Dutch parliament blocked the opening of EU accession negotiations with Albania. A large majority in the Dutch parliament prohibited the government from allowing Albania to start negotiations, over ‘serious concerns about combating corruption’. The motion was supported by 124 votes, with 26 against.

On 28–29 June 2018, the EU summit decided to postpone for the next year the decision on whether to open negotiations with Macedonia and Albania or not.

== International organizations ==
While the Netherlands is a founding member of the EU and NATO, Albania is an EU candidate country and joined NATO in 2009.

== Resident diplomatic missions ==
- Albania has an embassy in The Hague.
- the Netherlands has an embassy in Tirana.

== See also ==
- Foreign relations of Albania
- Foreign relations of the Netherlands
- Accession of Albania to the EU
- NATO-EU relations
- Albanians in the Netherlands
