= Albania–Lithuania relations =

- Albania: Lithuania

Albania–Lithuania relations are the bilateral relations between Albania and Lithuania. Both countries are members of NATO, the Council of Europe and the Organization for Security and Co-operation in Europe. Albania recognized Lithuania de jure оn 27 August 1991 and diplomatic relations were established on 27 April 1992.

Lithuania were a strong supporter for the Accession of Albania to the EU. Both countries align with all the EU’s common foreign and security policy positions.

== Resident diplomatic missions ==
- Albania is accredited to Lithuania from its embassy in Warsaw, Poland.
- Lithuania is accredited to Albania from its embassy in Athens, Greece.

== See also ==
- Foreign relations of Albania
- Foreign relations of Lithuania
- Accession of Albania to the EU
- NATO-EU relations
