= Albania–Belgium relations =

- Albania: Belgium

Diplomatic mission
- Albanian Embassy Brussels: Belgian Embassy; Tirana

Albania–Belgium relations are the bilateral relations between Albania and Belgium. Both countries are members of NATO, the Council of Europe and the Organization for Security and Co-operation in Europe. Albania is a European Union candidate and Belgium is a European Union member state.

== History ==
Diplomatic relations between Albania and Belgium were established in 1924. They continued during the reign of King Zog until they were interrupted during the Second World War. After 1945, contacts between the two countries were sporadic.

On 13 November 1970, Albania and Belgium restored diplomatic relations after the Albanian communist government had not recognized the diplomatic relations established before the Second World War.

Following the restoration of diplomatic relations, Belgium initially covered Albania from its embassy in Belgrade, while Albania covered Belgium from its embassy in Paris. Albanian diplomatic representation for Belgium continued to be handled from Paris until June 1991.

== High level visits ==
=== High-level visits from Albania to Belgium ===
Prime Minister Edi Rama:

- September 2013, travelled to Brussels to attend the European Commission focused on the following steps of Albania into the European Union and on the state of play of the country's commitment to reform in the light of this process. Rama met the President of the European Commission, José Manuel Barroso and the Member of the European Commission in charge of Enlargement and European Neighbourhood Policy, Štefan Füle.
- May 2017, travelled to Belgium to attend the 2017 Brussels NATO summit.
- June 2021, travelled to Brussels to attend the 31st NATO summit.
- March 2022, travelled to Brussels to attend the extraordinary NATO summit to discuss the Russian invasion of Ukraine.
- September 2025, travelled to NATO headquarters to meet with Secretary General Mark Rutte.

=== High-level visits from Belgium to Albania ===
- December 2022, Prime Minister Alexander De Croo Attended EU-Western Balkans summit
- May 2025, Prime Minister Bart De Wever attended the 6th European Political Community Summit.

== Resident diplomatic missions ==
- Albania has an embassy in Brussels.
- Belgium has an embassy in Tirana.

== See also ==
- Foreign relations of Albania
- Foreign relations of Belgium
- Accession of Albania to the EU
- NATO-EU relations
- Albanians in Belgium
