= Stanisław Zuber =

Polish geologist

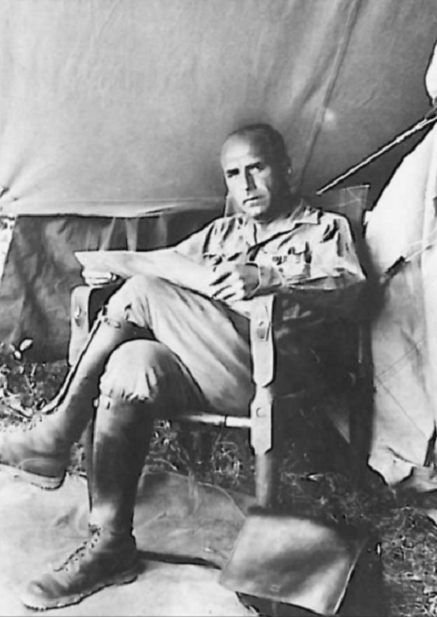
Stanisław Zuber

Stanisław Zuber (October 14, 1883 in Lviv – 1947 in Tirana, Albania) was a Polish geologist, specialist in the geology of oil deposits, as well as the regional and raw geology of Albania. He was tortured and killed in Tirana during communism while being in the same cell as the Albanian author Petro Marko.
