= Potential accession of Albania to the European Union =

Ongoing accession process of Albania to the EU

Process of potential accession of Albania to the European Union
- Status: Candidate negotiating (screening complete)
- Earliest possible entry: 2028–2030
Application
European perspective	2003
Membership application	24 April 2009
Candidate status	24 June 2014
Screening	19 July 2022
Screened & negotiations commence	15 October 2024
Negotiations
Clusters open	6
Chapters open	29
Clusters closed	0
Chapters closed	4 12.1% complete
Memberships & Treaties
Association Agreement
1 April 2009
Economic and monetary policy
EU Free Trade Agreement	part of the SAA
World Trade Organization (WTO)	Member since 8 September 2000
Euro & the Eurozone	The euro is widely accepted in Albania, although it has no formal approval, and the official currency of the country is the Albanian Lek.
Travel
Schengen visa liberalisation	15 December 2010
Energy
Energy Community	24 May 2006
Euratom	There are no nuclear power plants or research reactors in Albania.
ENTSO-E	Operatori i Sistemit te Transmetimit is a member
Foreign and military policy
North Atlantic Treaty Organization (NATO)	1 April 2009
Organization for Security and Co-operation in Europe (OSCE)	17 September 1991
Human rights and international courts
Council of Europe (CoE)	Member since 13 July 1995
International Criminal Court (ICC)	Member since 1 May 2003
International Court of Justice (ICJ)	Entitled to appear since 14 December 1955
Impact (27+1)
Population	446,828,803	449,845,596 ^{▲0.63%}
Area	4,233,262 km^{2} 1,634,472 mi^{2}	4,264,004 km^{2} ^{▲0.68%} 1,645,572 mi^{2} ^{▲0.68%}
HDI	0.896	0.891 ^{▼0.22%}
GDP (PPP)	$25.399 trillion
GDP per capita (PPP)	$56,928
GDP	$17.818 trillion
GDP per capita	$39,940
Gini	30.0	31.31 ^{▲0.4%}
Official Languages	24	Albanian ^{▲1}

The potential accession of Albania to the European Union (EU) is on the agenda for future enlargement of the EU. Albania applied for EU membership on 28 April 2009, and has since June 2014 been an official candidate for accession. The Council of the European Union decided in March 2020 to open accession negotiations with Albania.

The formal start of negotiations was delayed, however, because Albania’s path was linked to that of North Macedonia, which was vetoed by Bulgaria. On 24 June 2022, Bulgaria's parliament approved lifting the country's veto on opening EU accession talks with North Macedonia. On 16 July 2022, the Assembly of North Macedonia also approved the revised French proposal, allowing accession negotiations to begin. The start of negotiations was officially launched on 19 July 2022.

In October 2024, Albania aimed to be ready for accession by 2030, a timeline acknowledged by Prime Minister Edi Rama of the Socialist Party of Albania as "very ambitious." Following the Socialist Party's victory in the 2025 parliamentary elections, Emmanuel Macron suggested that Albania could potentially join as early as 2027, citing renewed political momentum.

As of 2026, the European Commissioner for Enlargement Marta Kos indicated that Albania could complete its negotiations by the end of 2027, potentially entering the EU shortly after Montenegro.

Albania is one of nine current EU candidate countries, together with Bosnia and Herzegovina, Georgia, Moldova, Montenegro, North Macedonia, Serbia, Turkey and Ukraine.

== Chronology of relations with the European Union ==
Officially recognised by the EU as a "potential candidate country" in 2000, Albania started negotiations on a Stabilisation and Association Agreement (SAA) in 2003. This was successfully agreed and signed on 12 June 2006, thus completing the first major step toward Albania's full membership in the EU.

Albania applied for European Union membership on 28 April 2009. After Albania's application for EU membership, the Council of the European Union asked the European Commission on 16 November 2009 to prepare an assessment on the readiness of Albania to start accession negotiations. On 16 December 2009, the European Commission submitted the Questionnaire on accession preparation to the Albanian government. Albania returned answers to the Commission on 14 April 2010. On 5 December 2013, an MEP meeting recommended to the council to grant Albania candidate status. On 23 June 2014, under the Greek EU Presidency, the Council of the European Union agreed to grant Albania candidate status, which was endorsed by the European Council a few days later. Following in the steps of countries joining the EU in 2004, Albania has been extensively engaged with EU institutions, and joined NATO as a full member in 2009.

The European Commission recommended that the EU open membership talks with Albania in its November 2016 assessment. In June 2018 the European Council agreed on a pathway to starting accession talks with Albania by the end of 2019.

Albania's EU accession was initially bundled with North Macedonia's EU accession. Albania was given certain pre-conditions for starting the accession negotiations, such as passing reforms in the justice system, a new electoral law, opening trials for corrupt judges and respect for the human rights of its Greek minority.

In May 2019, European Commissioner Johannes Hahn reiterated this recommendation. However, in June the EU General Affairs Council decided to postpone their decision on opening negotiations to October, due to objections from a number of countries including the Netherlands and France. The decision was vetoed again in October. On 25 March 2020, the Council of the European Union decided to open accession negotiations, which was endorsed by the European Council the following day.

In December 2022, Prime Minister Edi Rama hosted the 2022 EU-Western Balkans summit in Tirana.

On 13 September 2023, during her State of the European Union address, President of the European Commission, Ursula von der Leyen stated that the future of the Western Balkans was "in our Union".

On 25 September 2024, the EU announced the decoupling of Albania from North Macedonia on the EU accession path, due to the disputes between North Macedonia and Bulgaria around the Bulgarian minority in North Macedonia, which had delayed further talks. Following the decision on the decoupling of their processes, the EU opened negotiations on cluster 1 (Fundamentals) with Albania separately on 15 October 2024.

On 19 November 2024, Albania and the European Union signed a Security and Defence Partnership.

On 17 December 2024, the EU opened negotiations on cluster 6 (External relations) with Albania. On 14 April 2025, negotiations were opened on cluster 2 (Internal market), and on 22 May 2025, also on cluster 3 (Competitiveness and Inclusive Growth).

In May 2025, Marta Kos, the European Commissioner for Enlargement, reported that the opening of Cluster 4 (Green agenda and sustainable connectivity) and Cluster 5 (Resources, agriculture and cohesion) was scheduled for June. However, the sixth intergovernmental conference only later took place in September 16, with only Cluster 4 being opened. Albania opened negotiations on Cluster 5 on 17 November 2025.

On 21 May 2026, the Working Group on Enlargement in the European Union, COELA, approved the Interim Benchmark Assessment Report (IBAR) on Albania's progress in the accession process. On 26 May 2026, the eighth Intergovernmental Conference marked the official beginning of the final phase of negotiations (i.e. closure of chapters). Albanian Prime Minister Edi Rama's stated aim is to conclude negotiations by either 2027 or 2028.

On 30 September 2026, President of the European Commission Ursula von der Leyen started her Western Balkans tour by visiting Albania. At a joint press conference with Albanian Prime Minister Edi Rama, she described Albania as one of the leading countries in the European Union accession process, it was reported by BalkanWeb.com.

Timeline
Date	Event
1992	A Trade and Co-operation Agreement between the EU and Albania was signed, and Albania became eligible for funding under the EU Phare programme.
1997	The EU Council of Ministers established political and economic conditionality for the development of bilateral relations between Albania and the EU.
1999	The EU proposed the new Stabilisation and Association Process (SAP) for five countries of Southeastern Europe, including Albania. Starting from 1999 Albania benefited from Autonomous Trade Preferences with the EU.
2000	Duty-free access to EU market was granted for products from Albania.
June 2000	The European Council stated that all the SAP countries are "potential candidates" for EU membership.
November 2000	At the Zagreb Summit, the SAP was officially endorsed by the EU and the Western Balkan countries (including Albania).
2001	The first year of the new CARDS programme specifically designed for the SAP countries.
June 2001	The Commission recommended the undertaking of negotiations on a Stabilisation and Association Agreement (SAA) with Albania. The Göteborg European Council invited the commission to present draft negotiating directives for the negotiation of a SAA.
31 January 2003	The directives for the negotiation of a SAA with Albania were adopted. Commission President Prodi officially launches the negotiations for a SAA between the EU and Albania.
June 2003	At the Thessaloniki Summit, the SAP was confirmed as the EU policy for the Western Balkans and the EU perspective for these countries was confirmed (countries participating in the SAP started to be eligible for EU accession and would join the EU once they would become ready).
December 2005	The council made the decision on the principles of a revised European Partnership for Albania.
12 June 2006	The SAA was signed at the General Affairs and External Relations Council in Luxembourg.
9 November 2006	The European Commission decided to start visa facilitation negotiations with Albania.
13 April 2007	The visa facilitation agreement was signed in Zagreb. The signing EU Commissioner Franco Frattini was quoted saying that this is the first step toward a full abolishment of the visa requirements and the free movement of Albanian citizens in the EU.
1 January 2008	The visa facilitation agreement entered into force.
7 March 2008	EU Commissioner Franco Frattini while in Tirana opened the dialogue toward the liberalisation of the visa regime between Albania and EU.
1 April 2009	The Stabilisation and Association Agreement (SAA) entered into force.
28 April 2009	Albania formally applied for membership in the European Union.
16 November 2009	The Council of the EU asked the European Commission to prepare an assessment on Albania's readiness to start accession negotiations. The Commission submitted the questionnaire on accession preparation to the Albanian government.
14 April 2010	Albania submitted answers to the European Commission's questionnaire, but candidacy status was not granted by the EU in December 2010 due to a long-lasting political row in the country.
27 May 2010	The European Commission proposed visa free travel for Albania. The adopted proposal enabled citizens of Albania to travel to Schengen countries without needing a short term visa.
8 November 2010	The Council of the European Union approved visa-free travel to the Schengen Area for Albanian citizens.
15 December 2010	Visa-free access for Albanians to the Schengen area entered into force.
10 October 2012	The European Commission recommended that Albania be granted EU candidate status, subject to the completion of key measures in certain areas.
August 2012	The Albanian Parliament rejected a proposal to abolish immunity for parliament members, ministers and people in some other official positions. The EU required this to be abolished along with 11 other main issues, so candidate status was further delayed. However, in September 2012 a constitutional amendment was unanimously passed which limited the immunity of parliamentarians.
October 2012	The European Commission evaluated the progress of Albania to comply with 12 key conditions to achieve official candidate status and start accession negotiations. The report concluded that if Albania managed to hold a fair and democratic parliamentary election in June 2013, and also implemented the remaining changes to comply with the eight key priorities still not fully met, then the Council of the European Union would recommended granting Albania official candidate status.
23 June 2013	Albania held a general election, generally regarded as free and fair.
16 October 2013	The European Commission released its annual reports on prospective member states which concluded that the Albanian election was held in an "orderly manner" and that progress had been made in meeting other conditions; as such it recommended granting Albania candidate status.
5 December 2013	In an MEP meeting it was recommended that "...the Council should acknowledge the progress made by Albania by granting it candidate status without undue delay." However, several states, including Denmark and the Netherlands, remained opposed to granting Albania candidate status until it demonstrated that its recent progress could be sustained. Consequently, the Council of the European Union, at its meeting in December 2013, agreed to postpone the decision on candidate status until June 2014.
24 June 2014	Under the Greek EU Presidency, the Council of the European Union agreed to grant Albania candidate status, which was endorsed by the European Council a few days later. This coincided with the 10th anniversary of the "Agenda 2014", proposed by the Greek Government in 2004, as part of the EU-Western Balkans Summit in Thessaloniki, for boosting the integration of all the Western Balkan states into the European Union.
March 2015	At the fifth "High Level Dialogue meeting" between Albania and the EU, the EU Commissioner for Enlargement (Johannes Hahn) notified Albania that the setting of a start date for accession negotiations to begin still required the following two conditions to be met: 1) The government need to reopen political dialogue with the parliamentary opposition, 2) Albania must deliver quality reforms for all 5 earlier identified key areas not yet complied with (public administration, rule of law, corruption, organised crime, fundamental rights). This official stance, was fully supported by the European Parliament through its pass of a Resolution comment in April 2015, which agreed with all conclusions drawn by the commission's latest 2014 Progress Report on Albania. The Albanian Prime Minister outlined the next step of his government would be to submit a detailed progress report on the implementation of the 5 key reforms to the Commission in Autumn 2015, and then he expected the accession negotiations should start shortly afterwards - before the end of 2015.
22 July 2016	The Albanian parliament approved constitutional amendments on justice reforms.
9 November 2016	The Commission recommended the launch of negotiations.
26 November 2016	Germany announced that it would veto the opening accession talks until 2018.
Early 2017	The European Parliament warned the government leaders that the parliamentary elections in June must be "free and fair" before negotiations could begin to admit the country into the Union. The MEPs also expressed concern about the country's "selective justice, corruption, the overall length of judicial proceedings and political interference in investigations and court cases" but the EU Press Release expressed some optimism: "It is important for Albania to maintain today's reform momentum and we must be ready to support it as much as possible in this process".
December 2018	Greek Prime Minister Alexis Tsipras stated that respect of the rights of the Greek minority in Albania is a precondition for Albania's entry into the European Union.
June 2019	The European Commissioner Johannes Hahn recommended that the EU open membership talks with Albania. On 1 June 2019, the Council set out the path to opening accession negotiations, with talks thought to begin shortly thereafter.
September 2019	Germany's Bundestag set as its preconditions for Albania's EU accession negotiations the reforms in the justice system, continue the fight against drug trafficking, a new electoral law, creation of SPAK (Special Anti-Corruption Structure), functioning of the Constitutional Court & the Supreme court, appoint the new Prosecutor General, trials for the corrupt judges, and also drop some ambitions of Greater Albania.
24 March 2020	EU ministers reached a political agreement on opening accession talks with Albania and North Macedonia.
19 July 2022	The first Intergovernmental Conference (IGC) on accession negotiations was held between the EU and Albania. This marked the formal start of the accession talks. Additionally, the European Commission started the screening process.
25 September 2024	The EU decides to decouple Albania from North Macedonia on the EU accession path and announces that accession chapters for Albania will open on 15 October 2024.
15 October 2024	Albania opens negotiations with the EU on cluster 1 (Fundamentals) at the Second Intergovernmental Conference.
16 December 2024	Albania opens negotiations with the EU on cluster 6 (External relations) at the Third Intergovernmental Conference.
14 April 2025	Albania opens negotiations with the EU on cluster 2 (Internal market) at the Fourth Intergovernmental Conference.
22 May 2025	Albania opens negotiations with the EU on cluster 3 (Competitiveness and Inclusive Growth) at the Fifth Intergovernmental Conference.
16 September 2025	Albania opens negotiations with the EU on cluster 4 (Green Agenda and Sustainable Connectivity) at the Sixth Intergovernmental Conference.
17 November 2025	Albania opens negotiations with the EU on cluster 5 (Resources, Agriculture and Cohesion) at the Seventh Intergovernmental Conference, thus concluding the opening phase for all accession negotiation chapters.

Status of SAA ratification

Event	North Macedonia	Croatia	Albania	Montenegro (Note: Montenegro started negotiations in November 2005 while a part of Serbia and Montenegro. Separate technical negotiations were conducted regarding issues of sub-state organizational competency. A mandate for direct negotiations with Montenegro was established in July 2006. Direct negotiations were initiated on 26 September 2006 and concluded on 1 December 2006.)	Bosnia and Herzegovina	Serbia (Note: Serbia started negotiations in November 2005 while part of Serbia and Montenegro, with a modified mandate from July 2006.)	Kosovo (Note: Kosovo declared independence from Serbia in 2008 but is still claimed by Serbia as part of its territory. The European Union remains divided, with five EU member states not recognizing its independence. The EU launched a Stabilisation Tracking Mechanism for Kosovo on 6 November 2002 with the aim of aligning its policy with EU standards. On 10 October 2012 the European Commission found that there were no legal obstacles to Kosovo signing a SAA with the EU, as independence is not required for such an agreement.)
SAA negotiations start	2000-04-05	2000-11-24	2003-01-31	2005-10-10	2005-11-25	2005-10-10	2013-10-28
SAA initialled	2000-11-24	2001-05-14	2006-02-28	2007-03-15	2007-12-04	2007-11-07	2014-07-25
SAA/IA signature	2001-04-09	2001-10-29	2006-06-12	2007-10-15	2008-06-16	2008-04-29	2015-10-27
Interim Agreement:
EC ratification	2001-04-27	2002-01-30	2006-06-12	2007-10-15	2008-06-16	2009-12-08	N/A (Note: No Interim Agreement associated with Kosovo's SAA was concluded.)
SAP state ratification	2001-04-27	2002-01-30	2006-10-09	2007-11-14	2008-06-20	2008-09-22	N/A
entry into force	2001-06-01	2002-03-01	2006-12-01	2008-01-01	2008-07-01	2010-02-01	N/A
Deposit of the instrument of ratification:
SAP state	2001-04-27	2002-01-30	2006-11-09	2007-11-13	2009-02-26	2008-09-22	2016-02-26
Austria	2002-09-06	2002-03-15	2008-05-21	2008-07-04	2009-09-04	2011-01-13	N/A
Belgium	2003-12-29	2003-12-17	2008-10-22	2010-03-29	2010-03-29	2012-03-20	N/A
Bulgaria	joined the EU later			2008-05-30	2009-03-13	2010-08-12	N/A
Croatia	joined the EU later						N/A
Cyprus	joined the EU later		2008-05-30	2008-11-20	2009-07-02	2010-11-26	N/A
Czech Republic	joined the EU later		2008-05-07	2009-02-19	2009-07-23	2011-01-28	N/A
Denmark	2002-04-10	2002-05-08	2008-04-24	2008-06-25	2009-05-26	2011-03-04	N/A
Estonia	joined the EU later		2007-10-17	2007-11-22	2008-09-11	2010-08-19	N/A
Finland	2004-01-06	2004-01-06	2007-11-29	2009-03-18	2009-04-07	2011-10-21	N/A
France	2003-06-04	2003-06-04	2009-02-12	2009-07-30	2011-02-10	2012-01-16	N/A
Germany	2002-06-20	2002-10-18	2009-02-19	2009-11-16	2009-08-14	2012-02-24	N/A
Greece	2003-08-27	2003-08-27	2009-02-26	2010-03-04	2010-09-20	2011-03-10	N/A
Hungary	joined the EU later		2007-04-23	2008-05-14	2008-10-22	2010-11-16	N/A
Ireland	2002-05-06	2002-05-06	2007-06-11	2009-06-04	2009-06-04	2011-09-29	N/A
Italy	2003-10-30	2004-10-06	2008-01-07	2009-10-13	2010-09-08	2011-01-06	N/A
Latvia	joined the EU later		2006-12-19	2008-10-17	2009-11-12	2011-05-30	N/A
Lithuania	joined the EU later		2007-05-17	2009-03-04	2009-05-04	2013-06-26	N/A
Luxembourg	2003-07-28	2003-08-01	2007-07-04	2009-06-11	2010-12-22	2011-01-21	N/A
Malta	joined the EU later		2008-04-21	2008-12-11	2010-01-07	2010-07-06	N/A
Netherlands	2002-09-09	2004-04-30	2007-12-10	2009-01-29	2009-09-30	2012-02-27	N/A
Poland	joined the EU later		2007-04-14	2009-02-06	2010-04-07	2012-01-13	N/A
Portugal	2003-07-14	2003-07-14	2008-07-11	2008-09-23	2009-06-29	2011-03-04	N/A
Romania	joined the EU later			2009-01-15	2010-01-08	2012-05-22	N/A
Slovakia	joined the EU later		2007-07-20	2008-07-29	2009-03-17	2010-11-11	N/A
Slovenia	joined the EU later		2007-01-18	2008-02-07	2009-03-10	2010-12-07	N/A
Spain	2002-10-04	2002-10-04	2007-05-03	2009-03-12	2010-06-15	2010-06-21	N/A
Sweden	2002-06-25	2003-03-27	2007-03-21	2009-03-11	2009-09-14	2011-04-15	N/A
United Kingdom	2002-12-17	2004-09-03	2007-10-16	2010-01-12	2010-04-20	2011-08-11	N/A
European Communities or European Union and Euratom	2004-02-25	2004-12-21	2009-02-26	2010-03-29	2015-04-30	2013-07-22	2016-02-24 (Note: Kosovo's SAA was the first signed after the entry into force of the Lisbon treaty, which conferred a legal personality to the EU. As a result, unlike previous SAAs Kosovo's is exclusively between it and the EU and Euratom, and the member states are not parties independently.)
SAA entry into force	2004-04-01	2005-02-01	2009-04-01	2010-05-01	2015-06-01	2013-09-01	2016-04-01
EU membership (SAA lapsed)	(TBD)	2013-07-01	(TBD)	(TBD)	(TBD)	(TBD)	(TBD)

N/A: Not applicable.

== Visa liberalisation process ==
On 1 January 2008 the visa facilitation and readmission agreements between Albania and the EU entered into force. Albania received a road map from the EU for further visa liberalisation with Schengen countries in June 2008.

Albania started issuing biometric passports on 24 May 2009, which were designed to comply with EU guidelines. On 8 November 2010 the Council of the European Union approved visa-free travel to the Schengen Area for citizens of Albania. The decision entered into force on 15 December 2010.

== EU financial aid ==
In 2011, the EU paid €6 million to construct or refurbish border crossing points and border police stations to help Albania fight organised crime and illegal trafficking.

Until 2020, Albania had been receiving €1.2bn of developmental aid from the Instrument for Pre-Accession Assistance, a funding mechanism for EU candidate countries.

In 2024, the EU welcomed political agreement on the €6 billion Reform and Growth Facility for the Western Balkans, overall amount of the Facility for the period 2024-2027 is €6 billion. To finance the loan support, the European Union will raise €4 billion on the financial market until the end of 2027. The €2 billion of non-repayable support will be financed through additional resources from the Mid-Term revision of the Multiannual Financial Framework (MFF). Albania is expected to receive €922 million until 2027.

== Negotiation progress ==
During the 9th Accession Conference with Albania on 14 July 2026, three chapters were provisionally closed: Chapter 25 (Science and Research), Chapter 26 (Education and Culture) and Chapter 30 (External Relations).

As of October 2026, 29 chapters remain open.

The European Commission is preparing a roadmap that is expected to formally endorse Albania’s goal of completing its EU accession negotiations by the end of 2027.

According to Euronews sources from EU institutions, the document is expected to acknowledge Tirana’s ambition to close all negotiating chapters by December 2027, while also setting out priorities Albania will need to deliver on to address the remaining gaps in the accession process.

The 10th meeting of the Accession Conference with Albania was held in Luxembourg and provisionally closed Chapter 20 (enterprise and industrial policy) on 13 October 2026.

Clusters of negotiating chapters
Clusters	Acquis Chapter	State of Play	Cluster Opened	Cluster Closed
Overview	Overview	29 out of 33	6 out of 6	0 out of 6
Fundamentals	23. Judiciary & Fundamental Rights	Opened	Opened	–
Fundamentals	24. Justice, Freedom & Security	Opened	Opened	–
Fundamentals	Economic criteria	–	Opened	–
Fundamentals	Functioning of democratic institutions	–	Opened	–
Fundamentals	Public administration reform	–	Opened	–
Fundamentals	5. Public Procurement	Opened	Opened	–
Fundamentals	18. Statistics	Opened	Opened	–
Fundamentals	32. Financial Control	Opened	Opened	–
Internal market	1. Free Movement of Goods	Opened	Opened	–
Internal market	2. Freedom of Movement For Workers	Opened	Opened	–
Internal market	3. Right of Establishment & Freedom To Provide Services	Opened	Opened	–
Internal market	4. Free Movement of Capital	Opened	Opened	–
Internal market	6. Company Law	Opened	Opened	–
Internal market	7. Intellectual Property Law	Opened	Opened	–
Internal market	8. Competition Policy	Opened	Opened	–
Internal market	9. Financial Services	Opened	Opened	–
Internal market	28. Consumer & Health Protection	Opened	Opened	–
Competitiveness and inclusive growth	10. Information Society & Media	Opened	Opened	–
Competitiveness and inclusive growth	16. Taxation	Opened	Opened	–
Competitiveness and inclusive growth	17. Economic & Monetary Policy	Opened	Opened	–
Competitiveness and inclusive growth	19. Social Policy & Employment	Opened	Opened	–
Competitiveness and inclusive growth	20. Enterprise & Industrial Policy	Closed	Opened	–
Competitiveness and inclusive growth	25. Science & Research	Closed	Opened	–
Competitiveness and inclusive growth	26. Education & Culture	Closed	Opened	–
Competitiveness and inclusive growth	29. Customs Union	Opened	Opened	–
Green agenda and sustainable connectivity	14. Transport Policy	Opened	Opened	–
Green agenda and sustainable connectivity	15. Energy	Opened	Opened	–
Green agenda and sustainable connectivity	21. Trans-European Networks	Opened	Opened	–
Green agenda and sustainable connectivity	27. Environment	Opened	Opened	–
Resources, agriculture and cohesion	11. Agriculture & Rural Development	Opened	Opened	–
Resources, agriculture and cohesion	12. Food Safety, Veterinary & Phytosanitary Policy	Opened	Opened	–
Resources, agriculture and cohesion	13. Fisheries	Opened	Opened	–
Resources, agriculture and cohesion	22. Regional Policy & Coordination of Structural Instruments	Opened	Opened	–
Resources, agriculture and cohesion	33. Financial & Budgetary Provisions	Opened	Opened	–
External relations	30. External Relations	Closed	Opened	–
External relations	31. Foreign, Security & Defence Policy	Opened	Opened	–
	34. Institutions	–	–	–
	35. Other Issues	–	–	–

Screening and Chapter Dates
Progression	33 / 33 100% complete	33 / 33 100% complete	33 / 33 100% complete	4 / 33 12.1% complete
Acquis chapter	Screening Started	Screening Completed	Chapter Opened	Chapter Closed
1. Free Movement of Goods	2023-01-30	2023-03-09	2025-04-14	–
2. Freedom of Movement For Workers	2023-01-30	2023-03-09	2025-04-14	–
3. Right of Establishment & Freedom To Provide Services	2023-01-17	2023-03-09	2025-04-14	–
4. Free Movement of Capital	2022-10-07	2023-03-09	2025-04-14	–
5. Public Procurement	2022-09-15	2023-01-16	2024-10-15	–
6. Company Law	2023-02-03	2023-03-09	2025-04-14	–
7. Intellectual Property Law	2023-01-17	2023-03-09	2025-04-14	–
8. Competition Policy	2023-01-17	2023-03-09	2025-04-14	–
9. Financial Services	2022-10-07	2023-03-09	2025-04-14	–
10. Information Society & Media	2023-03-27	2023-06-15	2025-05-22	–
11. Agriculture & Rural Development	2023-11-13	2023-11-24	2025-11-17	–
12. Food Safety, Veterinary & Phytosanitary Policy	2023-11-20	2023-11-24	2025-11-17	–
13. Fisheries	2023-11-20	2023-11-24	2025-11-17	–
14. Transport Policy	2023-03-15	2023-09-29	2025-09-16	–
15. Energy	2023-03-15	2023-09-29	2025-09-16	–
16. Taxation	2023-03-31	2023-06-15	2025-05-22	–
17. Economic & Monetary Policy	2023-06-13	2023-06-15	2025-05-22	–
18. Statistics	2022-09-19	2023-01-16	2024-10-15	–
19. Social Policy & Employment	2023-05-23	2023-06-15	2025-05-22	–
20. Enterprise & Industrial Policy	2023-05-26	2023-06-15	2025-05-22	2026-10-13
21. Trans-European Networks	2023-03-15	2023-09-29	2025-09-16	–
22. Regional Policy & Coordination of Structural Instruments	2023-07-17	2023-10-25	2025-11-17	–
23. Judiciary & Fundamental Rights	2022-09-27	2023-01-16	2024-10-15	−
24. Justice, Freedom & Security	2022-09-27	2023-01-16	2024-10-15	–
25. Science & Research	2023-04-28	2023-06-15	2025-05-22	2026-07-14
26. Education & Culture	2023-04-27	2023-06-15	2025-05-22	2026-07-14
27. Environment & Climate Change	2023-03-18	2023-09-29	2025-09-16	–
28. Consumer & Health Protection	2023-02-17	2023-03-09	2025-04-14	–
29. Customs Union	2022-10-20	2023-06-15	2025-05-22	–
30. External Relations	2023-11-16	2023-11-17	2024-12-17	2026-07-14
31. Foreign, Security & Defence Policy	2023-11-16	2023-11-17	2024-12-17	–
32. Financial Control	2022-12-09	2023-01-16	2024-10-15	–
33. Financial & Budgetary Provisions	2023-07-17	2023-10-25	2025-11-17	–
34. Institutions	N/A	N/A	N/A	N/A
35. Other Issues	N/A	N/A	N/A	N/A

November 2026 European Commission Report
Acquis chapter	Status as of Nov 2026	Chapter Status as of August 2026
Overview	1 chapters with early stage/some preparation 2 chapters with some level of preparation 4 chapters with some/moderate preparation 8 chapters with moderate preparation 4 chapters with moderate/good preparation 14 chapters with good level of preparation 2 chapters with nothing to adopt	29 chapters open, 4 chapters closed.
1. Free Movement of Goods	Some / Moderate	Chapter open
2. Freedom of Movement For Workers	Moderately prepared	Chapter open
3. Right of Establishment & Freedom To Provide Services	Moderately prepared	Chapter open
4. Free Movement of Capital	Good level of preparation	Chapter open
5. Public Procurement	Moderate / Good	Chapter open
6. Company Law	Good level of preparation	Chapter open
7. Intellectual Property Law	Good level of preparation	Chapter open
8. Competition Policy	Some / Moderate	Chapter open
9. Financial Services	Good level of preparation	Chapter open
10. Information Society & Media	Good level of preparation	Chapter open
11. Agriculture & Rural Development	Some / Moderate	Chapter open
12. Food Safety, Veterinary & Phytosanitary Policy	Some / Moderate	Chapter open
13. Fisheries	Good level of preparation	Chapter open
14. Transport Policy	Moderately prepared	Chapter open
15. Energy	Good level of preparation	Chapter open
16. Taxation	Moderately prepared	Chapter open
17. Economic & Monetary Policy	Good level of preparation	Chapter open
18. Statistics	Moderately prepared	Chapter open
19. Social Policy & Employment	Moderately prepared	Chapter open
20. Enterprise & Industrial Policy	Good level of preparation	Chapter closed
21. Trans-European Networks	Good level of preparation	Chapter open
22. Regional Policy & Coordination of Structural Instruments	Moderately prepared	Chapter open
23. Judiciary & Fundamental Rights	Moderate / Good	Chapter open
24. Justice, Freedom & Security	Moderate / Good	Chapter open
25. Science & Research	Moderate / Good	Chapter closed
26. Education & Culture	Good level of preparation	Chapter closed
27. Environment & Climate Change	Some level of preparation	Chapter open
28. Consumer & Health Protection	Early stage / Some	Chapter open
29. Customs Union	Good level of preparation	Chapter open
30. External Relations	Good level of preparation	Chapter closed
31. Foreign, Security & Defence Policy	Good level of preparation	Chapter open
32. Financial Control	Moderately prepared	Chapter open
33. Financial & Budgetary Provisions	Some level of preparation	Chapter open
34. Institutions	Nothing to adopt	Nothing to adopt
35. Other Issues	Nothing to adopt	Nothing to adopt
Legend: Well advanced Good / Well advanced Good level of preparation Moderate / Good Moderately prepared Some / Moderate Some level of preparation Early stage / Some Early stage

Report history
Clusters	Acquis Chapter	November 2015	November 2016	April 2018	May 2019	October 2020	October 2021	October 2022	November 2023	October 2024	November 2025	November 2026
1. Fundamentals	Public administration reform	Moderately prepared	Moderately prepared	Moderately prepared	Moderately prepared	Moderately prepared	Moderately prepared	Moderately prepared	Moderately prepared	Moderately prepared	Moderately prepared	Moderately prepared
1. Fundamentals	23. Judiciary & Fundamental Rights	Some level of preparation	Some level of preparation	Some level of preparation	Some level of preparation	Some / Moderate	Some / Moderate	Some / Moderate	Some / Moderate	Moderately prepared	Moderately prepared	Moderate / Good
1. Fundamentals	24. Justice, Freedom & Security	Early stage	Some level of preparation	Some level of preparation	Moderately prepared	Moderately prepared	Moderately prepared	Moderately prepared	Moderately prepared	Moderately prepared	Moderately prepared	Moderate / Good
1. Fundamentals	The existence of a functioning market economy	Moderately prepared	Moderately prepared	Moderately prepared	Moderately prepared	Moderately prepared	Moderately prepared	Moderately prepared	Moderate / Good	Good level of preparation	Good level of preparation	Good level of preparation
1. Fundamentals	The capacity to cope with competitive pressure and market forces within the Union	Some level of preparation	Some level of preparation	Some level of preparation	Some level of preparation	Some level of preparation	Some level of preparation	Some level of preparation	Some level of preparation	Some level of preparation	Some level of preparation	Some / Moderate
1. Fundamentals	5. Public Procurement	Some level of preparation	Some level of preparation	Some level of preparation	Some level of preparation	Moderately prepared	Moderately prepared	Moderately prepared	Moderately prepared	Moderately prepared	Moderately prepared	Moderate / Good
1. Fundamentals	18. Statistics	Some level of preparation	Moderately prepared	Moderately prepared	Moderately prepared	Moderately prepared	Moderately prepared	Moderately prepared	Moderately prepared	Moderately prepared	Moderately prepared	Moderately prepared
1. Fundamentals	32. Financial Control	Moderately prepared	Moderately prepared	Moderately prepared	Moderately prepared	Moderately prepared	Moderately prepared	Moderately prepared	Moderately prepared	Moderately prepared	Moderately prepared	Moderately prepared
2. Internal Market	1. Free Movement of Goods	Moderately prepared	Moderately prepared	Some level of preparation	Some / Moderate	Some / Moderate	Some / Moderate	Some / Moderate	Some / Moderate	Some / Moderate	Some / Moderate	Some / Moderate
2. Internal Market	2. Freedom of Movement For Workers	Early stage	Early stage	Early stage	Some level of preparation	Some level of preparation	Some level of preparation	Some level of preparation	Some level of preparation	Some level of preparation	Some / Moderate	Moderately prepared
2. Internal Market	3. Right of Establishment & Freedom To Provide Services	Moderately prepared	Moderately prepared	Moderately prepared	Moderately prepared	Moderately prepared	Moderately prepared	Moderately prepared	Moderately prepared	Moderately prepared	Moderately prepared	Moderately prepared
2. Internal Market	4. Free Movement of Capital	Moderately prepared	Moderately prepared	Moderately prepared	Moderately prepared	Moderately prepared	Moderately prepared	Moderately prepared	Moderately prepared	Moderately prepared	Moderate / Good	Good level of preparation
2. Internal Market	6. Company Law	Moderately prepared	Moderately prepared	Moderately prepared	Moderately prepared	Moderately prepared	Moderately prepared	Moderately prepared	Moderately prepared	Moderately prepared	Moderately prepared	Good level of preparation
2. Internal Market	7. Intellectual Property Law	Some level of preparation	Some level of preparation	Some level of preparation	Moderately prepared	Moderately prepared	Moderately prepared	Some / Moderate	Moderately prepared	Moderately prepared	Moderately prepared	Good level of preparation
2. Internal Market	8. Competition Policy	Moderately prepared	Moderately prepared	Some level of preparation	Some / Moderate	Some / Moderate	Some / Moderate	Some / Moderate	Some / Moderate	Some / Moderate	Some / Moderate	Some / Moderate
2. Internal Market	9. Financial Services	Moderately prepared	Moderately prepared	Moderately prepared	Moderately prepared	Moderately prepared	Moderately prepared	Moderately prepared	Moderate / Good	Moderate / Good	Moderate / Good	Good level of preparation
2. Internal Market	28. Consumer & Health Protection	Early stage	Early stage	Early stage	Early stage	Early stage	Early stage	Early stage	Early stage	Early stage	Early stage	Early stage / Some
3. Competitiveness; and inclusive growth	10. Information Society & Media	Moderately prepared	Moderately prepared	Moderately prepared	Moderately prepared	Moderately prepared	Moderately prepared	Moderately prepared	Moderately prepared	Moderate / Good	Moderate / Good	Good level of preparation
3. Competitiveness; and inclusive growth	16. Taxation	Moderately prepared	Moderately prepared	Moderately prepared	Moderately prepared	Moderately prepared	Moderately prepared	Moderately prepared	Moderately prepared	Moderately prepared	Moderately prepared	Moderately prepared
3. Competitiveness; and inclusive growth	17. Economic & Monetary Policy	Moderately prepared	Moderately prepared	Moderately prepared	Moderately prepared	Moderately prepared	Moderately prepared	Moderately prepared	Moderate / Good	Moderate / Good	Moderate / Good	Good level of preparation
3. Competitiveness; and inclusive growth	19. Social Policy & Employment	Some level of preparation	Some level of preparation	Some level of preparation	Some level of preparation	Some level of preparation	Some level of preparation	Some level of preparation	Moderately prepared	Moderately prepared	Moderately prepared	Moderately prepared
3. Competitiveness; and inclusive growth	20. Enterprise & Industrial Policy	Moderately prepared	Moderately prepared	Moderately prepared	Moderately prepared	Moderately prepared	Moderately prepared	Moderately prepared	Moderately prepared	Moderate / Good	Moderate / Good	Good level of preparation
3. Competitiveness; and inclusive growth	25. Science & Research	Early stage	Early stage	Early stage	Early stage	Early stage	Some level of preparation	Some level of preparation	Some level of preparation	Some level of preparation	Some / Moderate	Moderate / Good
3. Competitiveness; and inclusive growth	26. Education & Culture	Moderately prepared	Moderately prepared	Moderately prepared	Moderately prepared	Moderately prepared	Moderately prepared	Moderately prepared	Moderately prepared	Moderately prepared	Moderate / Good	Good level of preparation
3. Competitiveness; and inclusive growth	29. Customs Union	Moderately prepared	Moderately prepared	Moderately prepared	Moderately prepared	Moderately prepared	Moderately prepared	Moderately prepared	Moderately prepared	Moderately prepared	Moderate / Good	Good level of preparation
4. Green agenda; and sustainable connectivity	14. Transport Policy	Some level of preparation	Some level of preparation	Some level of preparation	Some level of preparation	Some level of preparation	Some level of preparation	Some level of preparation	Some level of preparation	Some level of preparation	Some level of preparation	Moderately prepared
4. Green agenda; and sustainable connectivity	15. Energy	Moderately prepared	Moderately prepared	Moderately prepared	Moderately prepared	Moderately prepared	Moderately prepared	Moderately prepared	Moderate / Good	Moderate / Good	Good level of preparation	Good level of preparation
4. Green agenda; and sustainable connectivity	21. Trans-European Networks	Some level of preparation	Some level of preparation	Some level of preparation	Some level of preparation	Some level of preparation	Some level of preparation	Some level of preparation	Some level of preparation	Some level of preparation	Some level of preparation	Good level of preparation
4. Green agenda; and sustainable connectivity	27. Environment & Climate Change	Early stage	Some level of preparation	Some level of preparation	Some level of preparation	Some level of preparation	Some level of preparation	Some level of preparation	Some level of preparation	Some level of preparation	Some level of preparation	Some level of preparation
5. Resources, agriculture; and cohesion	11. Agriculture & Rural Development	Early stage	Early stage	Early stage	Some level of preparation	Some level of preparation	Some level of preparation	Some level of preparation	Some level of preparation	Some level of preparation	Some level of preparation	Some / Moderate
5. Resources, agriculture; and cohesion	12. Food Safety, Veterinary & Phytosanitary Policy	Some level of preparation	Some level of preparation	Some level of preparation	Some level of preparation	Some level of preparation	Some level of preparation	Some level of preparation	Some level of preparation	Some level of preparation	Some level of preparation	Some / Moderate
5. Resources, agriculture; and cohesion	13. Fisheries	Early stage	Early stage	Early stage	Early stage	Early stage	Some level of preparation	Some / Moderate	Moderately prepared	Moderately prepared	Moderately prepared	Good level of preparation
5. Resources, agriculture; and cohesion	22. Regional Policy & Coordination of Structural Instruments	Moderately prepared	Moderately prepared	Moderately prepared	Moderately prepared	Moderately prepared	Moderately prepared	Moderately prepared	Moderately prepared	Moderately prepared	Moderately prepared	Moderately prepared
5. Resources, agriculture; and cohesion	33. Financial & Budgetary Provisions	Some level of preparation	Some level of preparation	Some level of preparation	Some level of preparation	Some level of preparation	Some level of preparation	Some level of preparation	Some level of preparation	Some level of preparation	Some level of preparation	Some level of preparation
6. External relations	30. External Relations	Moderately prepared	Moderately prepared	Moderately prepared	Moderately prepared	Moderately prepared	Good level of preparation	Good level of preparation	Good level of preparation	Good level of preparation	Good level of preparation	Good level of preparation
6. External relations	31. Foreign, Security & Defence Policy	Good level of preparation	Good level of preparation	Good level of preparation	Good level of preparation	Good level of preparation	Good level of preparation	Good level of preparation	Good level of preparation	Good level of preparation	Good level of preparation	Good level of preparation
	34. Institutions	N/A	N/A	N/A	N/A	N/A	N/A	N/A	N/A	N/A	N/A	N/A
	35. Other Issues	N/A	N/A	N/A	N/A	N/A	N/A	N/A	N/A	N/A	N/A	N/A
Average level		2.36	2.44	2.39	2.53	2.57	2.65	2.65	2.76	2.82	2.9	3.31
Legend: levels of preparation are assigned scores from 1 to 5 to calculate the "Average level" row. 5 Well advanced 4.5 Good / Well advanced 4 Good level of preparation 3.5 Moderate / Good 3 Moderately prepared 2.5 Some / Moderate 2 Some level of preparation 1.5 Early stage / Some 1 Early stage

== Challenges to EU Accession ==
Critics have raised alarm over the extended use of Pre-trial detention, arguing that lengthy detention without timely trial risks undermining due process and the presumption of innocence, both core EU standards. Other persistent challenges include political interference in state institutions, weak coordination among judicial bodies, shortages of judges caused by the vetting process, and concerns over media freedom and transparency in governance. While Albania remains one of the frontrunners among candidate states, further structural reforms will be necessary before accession can be completed.

== Public opinion ==
Back in 2012, 86.5 percent of Albanians were in favour of an EU membership bid, whilst in a 2021 poll it was found that as many as 97% of Albanians are in favour of EU accession.

A survey carried out in March and April 2025 by Eurobarometer shows that citizens of Albania have a high level of trust in the EU (80%). When it comes to EU membership, the situation in the country is similar, with more than 80% of citizens of Albania believing it would be a good thing.

According to the 2025 annual survey of opinion in Albania, 82% of citizens have a positive attitude towards the EU (44% very positive, 38% fairly positive), while trust in the EU is 92%. It is also revealed that 92% of citizens would vote in favour of Albania's membership of the EU if a referendum was held, while 93% of citizens believe that EU membership would bring more advantages than disadvantages.

== Impact of joining ==
Member countries	Population (2026)	Area	GDP (2025)	GDP per capita	Languages	Scripts
Albania	2,335,930	28,748 km^{2} 11,100 mi^{2}	USD 30.54B	USD 13,074	Albanian	Latin
EU27	452,000,000	4,233,262 km^{2} 1,634,472 mi^{2}	USD 21.24T	USD 46,991	24	3
EU27+1	454,335,930 (+0.51%)	4,262,010 km^{2} 1,645,571 mi^{2} (+0.68%)	USD 21.27T (+0.14%)	USD 46,815 (–0.37%)	25 (+1)	3

== Albania's foreign relations with EU member states ==
- Austria
- Belgium
- Bulgaria
- Croatia
- Cyprus
- Czech Republic
- Denmark
- Estonia
- Finland
- France
- Germany
- Greece
- Hungary
- (Republic of Ireland) Ireland
- Italy
- Latvia
- Lithuania
- Luxembourg
- Malta
- Netherlands
- Poland
- Portugal
- Romania
- Slovakia
- Slovenia
- Spain
- Sweden

== See also ==
- Potential accession of Armenia to the European Union
- Potential accession of Bosnia and Herzegovina to the European Union
- Potential accession of Georgia to the European Union
- Potential accession of Kosovo to the European Union
- Potential accession of Moldova to the European Union
- Potential accession of Montenegro to the European Union
- Potential accession of North Macedonia to the European Union
- Potential accession of Serbia to the European Union
- Potential accession of Ukraine to the European Union
- Albania–NATO relations
- Delegation of European Union to Albania
- Enlargement of the European Union
- Future enlargement of the European Union
- Albania–Greece relations
- Corruption in Albania
- Democratic backsliding in Europe by country#Albania
- Albanian incinerators scandal
- AKSHI public procurement scandal
- 2025–2026 Albanian opposition protests
- Flamingo Revolution
