= Bleri Lleshi =

Albanian philosopher

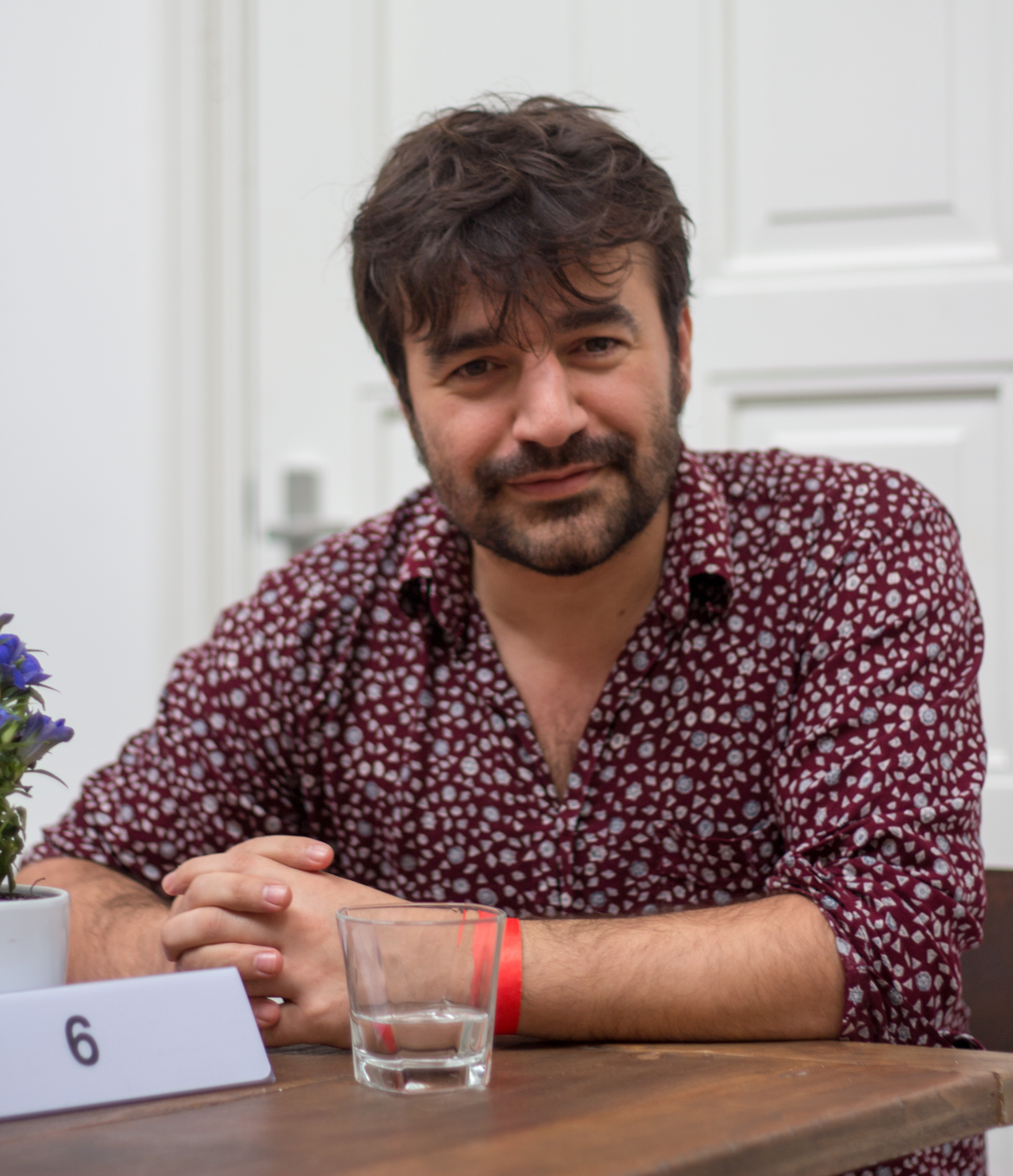
- Born: 1981 (age 43–44); Albania

Philosophical work
- Main interests: Philosophy
- Website: blerilleshi.wordpress.com

Blerim Gjonpalaj, better known by his pen name Bleri Lleshi is an Albanian philosopher and public speaker . He is an activist, dj, and author based in Brussels. His research focuses on topics such as inequality, neoliberalism, youth, migration, identities, and extremism.

Lleshi was born in 1981 in Albania. He writes for various Belgian media such as De Morgen and MO*, but also English ones such as EUObserver and The Brussels Times.

Lleshi has participated in conferences, debates, and media such as Euronews, BBC, Channel4, etc. In 2014, he was considered as one of the most influential immigrants in Belgium. In December 2018 he was named ambassador of peace for 2018 by Pax Christi. Lleshi is lecturer at UCLL in Leuven.

== Artistic project as DJ Bruselo ==
Lleshi has also an artistic project as a DJ. His artist name is Bruselo (pr. brusé:lo), Esperanto for Brussels. As DJ he plays recorded music from all over the world such as Balkanic, cumbia, afrobeat, soukous, arabesque, to hip hop, dancehall, and reggae. He is also the organizer and resident DJ of Globalicious, a monthly event in Brussels with concerts, international guests, dance workshops and dj's.

== Publications ==
- De kracht van hoop, EPO, 2018
- Inaya. Brief aan mijn kind, EPO, 2017
- Lleshi, Bleri., Liefde in tijden van angst, EPO, 2016,
- De neoliberale strafstaat (The neoliberal penal state), EPO, 2014. ISBN 9789491297496.
- Brieven uit Brussel / Lettres de Bruxelles · Jongeren aan het woord / Les jeunes prennent la parole (Letters of Brussels · Youth is Speaking), as editor, EPO, 2013. ISBN 9789491297533.
- Identiteit en interculturaliteit. Identiteitsconstructie bij jongeren in Brussel (Identity and multiculturalism. Identity construction among young people in Brussels), Vubpress 2010, as co-author with Marc Van den Bosche. ISBN 9789054878766.
