= Romania's reaction to the 2008 Kosovo declaration of independence =

Kosovo's declaration of independence from Serbia was enacted on 17 February 2008 by a unanimous vote of the Assembly of Kosovo. All 11 representatives of the Serb minority boycotted the proceedings. International reactions were mixed, and the global community continues to be divided on the issue of the international recognition of Kosovo. Romania has mostly rejected any attempt or proposal on recognizing Kosovo's independence.

== Reaction ==
On 18 February 2008, a joint session of the Parliament of Romania voted to not recognise Kosovo's independence by 357 to 27, with support from all parties except the Democratic Union of Hungarians in Romania (UDMR). Furthermore, the President Traian Băsescu and Prime Minister Călin Popescu-Tăriceanu opposed recognition.

In February 2009, Romanian Foreign Minister Cristian Diaconescu said that "Romania does not change its position and will not recognize Kosovo's independence, which contradicts to the norms and principles of the international law" and that the European Parliament's (EP) resolution on Kosovo is not binding. In September 2009, President Băsescu announced that Romania will partner Serbia in its action at the International Court of Justice (ICJ) and said that "territorial partitions are unacceptable, regardless of what explanations [are] put forward to support them".

On 24 September 2010, Romanian Prime Minister Emil Boc said in an address to the United Nations General Assembly (UNGA) that while Romania respected the ICJ's opinion on the legality of Kosovo's independence, it did not examine the key issue which was the legality of the creation of a new state. He also said that Romania will continue to not recognise Kosovo's independence.

In March 2012, a majority of Romanian MEPs, including Elena Băsescu (the president Băsescu's daughter), voted in favour of a resolution calling on the European Union (EU) countries which had not recognised Kosovo to do so. In April 2012, Diaconescu said "as far as we are concerned, we clearly stated our approach, which has not changed: Romania will not recognize this province because it does not meet all requirements of the international laws to function as a state. But certainly, the situation must be analyzed especially through the perspective of the relation Belgrade will establish with this province".

In April 2013, following a resolution by the EP which urged all EU members states which had not recognised Kosovo to do so again, Romania's Prime Minister Victor Ponta stated that his country must follow EU's lead. In May 2015, Ponta stated that "in 2008, Romania decided to not recognize Kosovo. However, things have changed since then. Governments have changed and some new decision on the recognition of Kosovo could be made... because many things have changed in Kosovo since 2008".

In March 2018, during a meeting with President of Serbia Aleksandar Vučić, President of Romania Klaus Iohannis expressed Romania's offer to mediate a solution between Serbia and Kosovo. However, Romania's offer to mediate was rejected by the government of Kosovo, which stated that until Romania recognizes Kosovo's independence, it cannot be a credible mediator.

In April 2023, Romania along with Azerbaijan, Cyprus, Georgia, Hungary, Serbia and Spain voted against approving Kosovo's membership in the Council of Europe.

It has been said that Romania has not recognized Kosovo for fear of the secession of Székely Land, a region in Romania inhabited by ethnic Hungarians, and because of the unrecognized state of Transnistria and Romania's good relations with Serbia.

== See also ==
- Romania–Serbia relations
