= Friendship Association Norway–Albania =

Friendship Association Norway–Albania (Norwegian: Vennskapssambandet Norge–Albania) or VNA was an organization in Norway, supporting political and cultural relations with the People's Socialist Republic of Albania. The VNA was one of many International friendship associations between Western and Communist countries, following the Marxist concept of friendship of peoples rather than of rulers.

VNA arranged seminars and study trips from Norway to Albania from the 1960s until the early 1980s. The trips were popular: Kvilstad describes a 1973 ad in Klassekampen advertising extra flights due to the four flights that had originally been planned being sold out. A short note in the same newspaper in 1975 announced six trips being organised that summer.

VNA and its study trips have been the subject of several books, including novels by Espen Haavardsholm and Dag Solstad. The 2017 nonfiction book Turist i Utopia - reiser i ideologi og albansk landskap (Tourist in Utopia - Travels in Ideology and Albanian Landscapes) by Rune Ottosen includes reflections on Ottosen's own experiences as a tourist on trips to Albania organised by the VNA in the early 1970s. He was also a leader on a trip in 1978 during the dramatic split between China and Albania.

The VNA was active in public debates. For example, in 1975 Jon Skard discussed an op-ed by VNA's leader at the time, Liv Thorsen. Thorsen argued that workers were not oppressed in the People's Socialist Republic of Albania, Skard further extended his critique of Thorsen and the VNA's defence of communist Albania in a length essay in a debate book.

Initially, VNA was dominated by the Socialist Youth League.

In 1979, VNA was divided, based on the Sino-Albanian split. A special conference of VNA was held. At the conference 67 members of VNA, mainly affiliated with the Communist University League, resigned from the association. This group then founded the Norwegian–Albanian Friendship Association (Norsk-Albansk Vennskapsforening).

Members of the VNA and people who travelled on their trips to Albania were on the Norwegian Police Security Service watch list.
