= Igli Hasani =

Albanian high-ranking diplomat and security expert

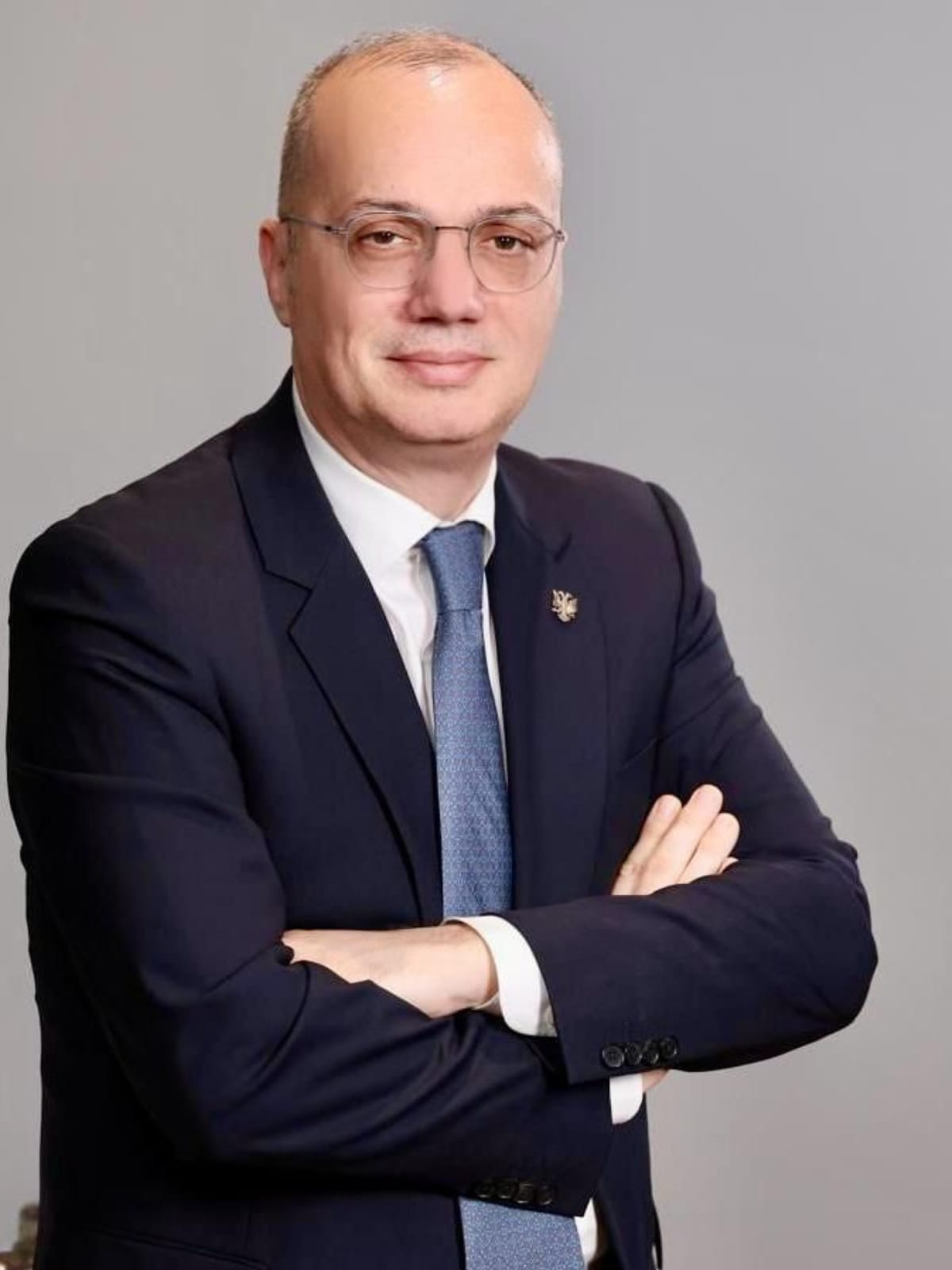
- Igli Hasani

Chair, Parliamentary Committee on Europe and Foreign Affairs
- Incumbent
- Assumed office 16 September 2025
- Prime Minister: Edi Rama

Minister for Europe and Foreign Affairs
- In office 12 September 2023 – 16 September 2025
- Prime Minister: Edi Rama
- Preceded by: Olta Xhaçka
- Succeeded by: Elisa Spiropali

Personal details
- Education: University of Tirana; King's College London

Igli Hasani (born 4 December 1976 in Tirana) is an Albanian high-ranking diplomat and security expert. He served as the Minister for Europe and Foreign Affairs of the Republic of Albania in the government of Prime Minister Edi Rama from September 2023 until September 2025. Since September 2025, he has been serving as the Chairman of the Parliamentary Committee on Europe and Foreign Affairs

== Biography ==
Igli Hasani completed his studies at the University of Tirana, at the Faculty of Social Sciences for Philosophy - Sociology (BA, 1996 - 2001), as well as at the Faculty of Law for Law (LLB, 2001-2006). He completed the master’s Studies (MA) in International Relations (2006) at Kings College in London, in a joint programme with the Royal College of Defence Studies of Great Britain, one of the most prestigious Defence Educational Institutions in the world. During his professional career, Igli Hasani has completed a series of executive qualifications at the Marshall Center in Germany and the Monterey Naval Postgraduate School in the United States of America.

Before taking on his current position as Minister of Europe and Foreign Affairs, in the period October 2021 - September 2023, Igli Hasani held the position of OSCE Coordinator for Economic-Environmental Affairs. This was the highest position held by an Albanian citizen in the OSCE since Albania's membership in the Organization in 1991.

Igli Hasani joined the Albanian diplomatic corps in 2018, as Ambassador Extraordinary and Plenipotentiary and Permanent Representative of the Republic of Albania to International Organizations in Vienna, a position he held until September 2021.

In December 2018, Albania received the support of the participating States of the Organization for Security and Cooperation in Europe (OSCE) to chair the Organization in 2020. The Albanian Chairmanship of the OSCE would be the first time that Albania would chair the world’s largest regional security organization, thus taking on an unprecedented responsibility in multilateral diplomacy. To this end, in the years 2019-2021 when Albania was part of the OSCE leadership Troika, Ambassador Hasani led an international team composed of 40+ Albanian and foreign diplomats and experts, work which culminated in the Albanian Chairmanship of the OSCE in 2020.

In a very difficult year marked by the global pandemic of COVID-19, Albania, under the leadership of Prime Minister Rama as the Chair in Office of the OSCE, and Ambassador Hasani in Vienna as Chair of the OSCE Permanent Council, achieved concrete results for the Organization, which included the non-interrupted operations in virtual format for the first time in history, as well as the election of the 4 OSCE leadership positions. Also, in the Ministerial of Tirana, the first held under pandemic conditions and in an almost fully virtual format and without the possibility of in person negotiations, the Albanian Chairmanship managed to secure consensus for the adoption of 11 decisions of the Council of Ministers of the OSCE, in each of the dimensions of the work of the Organization, specifically that of security, economic-environmental, and human rights. The Albanian chairmanship of the OSCE was widely considered successful, proving the readiness of Albania and its diplomatic service for important tasks in the international arena.

During 2019 and in the period January - September 2021, Mr. Hasani led respectively the Mediterranean Contact Group and the Cooperation Group of Asian Partners in Vienna, as well as worked closely with the Slovak and Swedish Presidencies of the OSCE as part of the OSCE Troika.

In the period 2001 - 2018, Mr. Hasani held leadership positions in the Ministry of Defense, including as Secretary General (2017-2018), Director General for Defense Policies (2014), Director of NATO, EU and Foreign Relations and General Director of Support Services and Legal Director (2013), as well as Director of Euro-Atlantic Integration and Defense Policy (2008-2011). During the years 2012-2013, Igli Hasani held the position of Head of the Department for Security and International Relations at the National Center for Security and Defense.

Before starting his career in the field of security and then diplomacy, Igli Hasani had several years of experience in the field of media and journalism and serving as a Policy and Media Advisor to the Minister of Defense (2006-2008) as well as Director of Press and Information at the Ministry of Defense (2004-2006). During the years 2001-2003 he held the position of Deputy Director of Press and Information in the Ministry of Defense as well as Head of Public Relations for the Secretariat for Refugees in the Ministry of Local Government and Decentralization.

Earlier, Igli Hasani was a journalist and editor in several Albanian newspapers and TV during the years 1997-2001.
