= Visar Dodani =

Albanian journalist and activist (1857–1939)

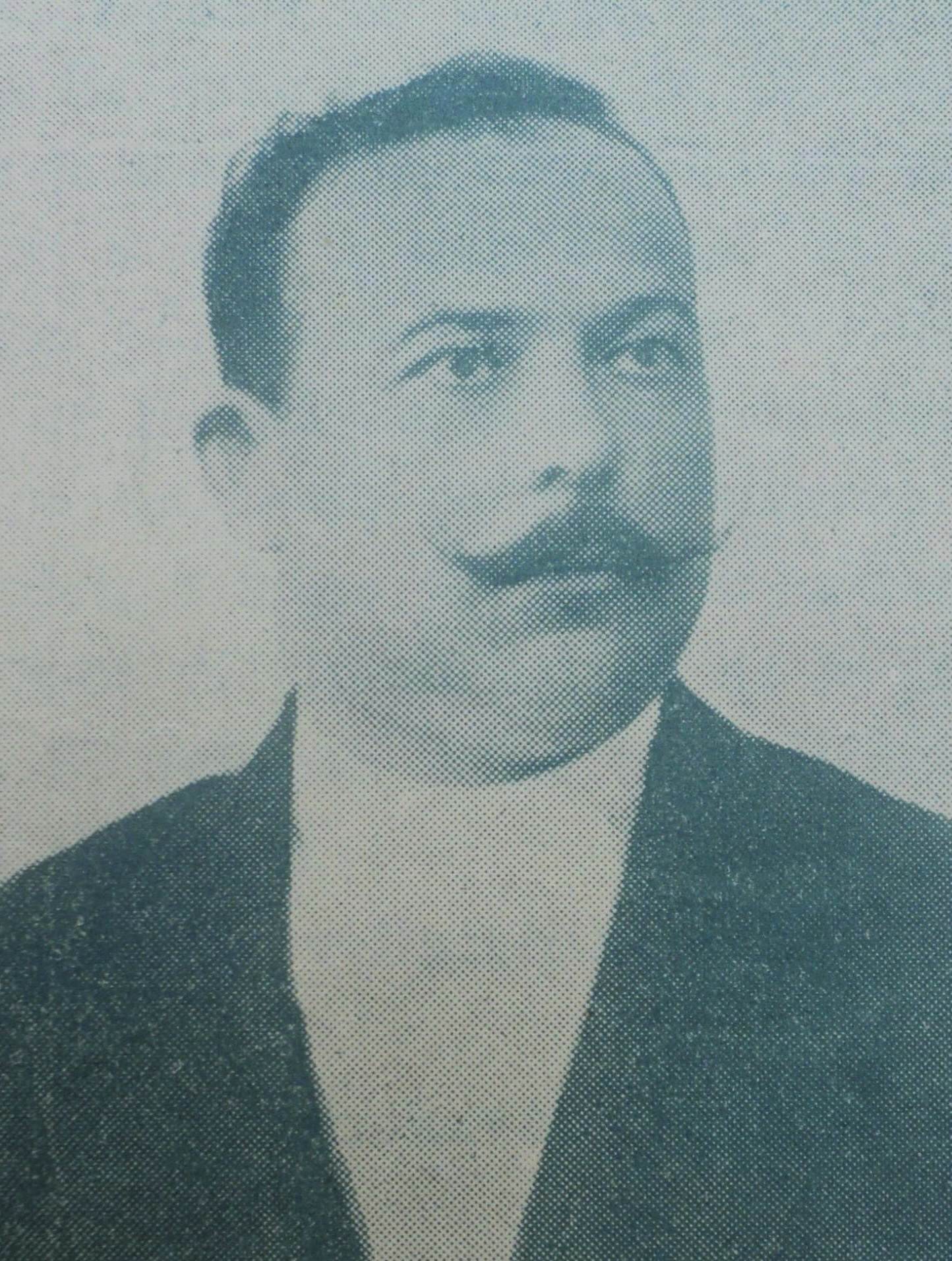
Visar Dodani

Visar Dodani^{[a]} (1857–1939) was a wealthy Albanian journalist and activist of the Albanian National Awakening.

== Life ==
Visar Dodani was born in Korçë, Ottoman Empire (modern Albania) in 1857. In 1880 he moved to Bucharest, Romania, where he joined the Albanian association Drita (English: Light), major organization of the Albanian National Awakening. Drita had a newspaper Shqipëria (Albania) and it was published under the stewardship of Dodani. In Romania, Dodani frequently wrote articles in Romanian newspapers regarding Albanian-related issues. In 1896 the Romanian government offered him Romanian citizenship. Visar Dodani was also a founding member of the nationalist organization Lidhja Shqiptare Ortodokse.

Dodani's newspaper, beginning in March 1898, advocated a view of the common Illyrian origin of Albanians and Romanians, and their shared contemporary struggle.

In 1898 he published the Mjalt' e mbletësë a farë-faresh, viersha, të-thëna, njera-tiatra, dhe fytyra Shqipëtarësh me jetën e tyre, a folkloric collection of 247 pages, printed in the printing house of the Albanian Colony of Bucharest. On 8 February 1903, Dodani published in Bucharest Trigelhim a Serb' e Zuzarevet ("The villains' ringing in Serbian), a collection of satiric poetry, dedicated to those who didn't want the testament of V.Tarpo (an Albanian expatriate) to come public. In 1910 he translated and adapted the Il trovatore of Salvadore Cammarano in 5 acts.

In 1915, Dodani settled in Geneva, Switzerland. He got involved with the Albanian diplomatic efforts there, serving as secretary of the local Albanian National Committee (Alb: Komiteti Kombëtar Shqiptar) led by Turhan Pasha and later by George Adamidi. In Autumn 1919, Dodani moved back to Romania. He died in Bucharest.

== See also ==
- Albanians in Romania

== Notes and references ==
Notes:

a.	His name appears as V.A.D., Vissarion A. Dodani, or Viskë A. Dodani as well.

== Sources ==
- Bartl, Peter (1995). Albanien: vom Mittelalter bis zur Gegenwart (in German). Pustet. p. 151. ISBN 3-7917-1451-1.
- Revista română de sociologie (in Romanian). Institutul de Sociologie (Academia Română). Editura Academiei Române. 2006. p. 528.
