= Romania in NATO =

Romania–NATO relations
- NATO: Romania

Romania joined the North Atlantic Treaty Organization (NATO) on March 29, 2004, following the decision taken at the Prague Summit, in November 2002. For Romania, this has represented a major evolution, with decisive influence upon the foreign and domestic policy of Romania. NATO membership represents the guarantee of security and external stability, which is vital for ensuring the prosperous development of the country. Romania is playing an active role in promoting the values and objectives of the Alliance, by both participating in the operations and missions of the Alliance and involving in its conceptual initiatives and evolutions.

== Military relations and peacekeeping missions ==
Romania was a partner to the allied forces during the Gulf War, particularly during its service as president of the UN Security Council. Romania has been active in peacekeeping operations in UNAVEM in Angola, IFOR/SFOR in Bosnia, in Albania, in Afghanistan and sent 860 troops in Iraq after the invasion led by the United States.

The Romanian state received an invitation to open accession negotiations to the Alliance in 2002 at the Prague Summit together with Bulgaria, Estonia, Latvia, Lithuania, Slovakia and Slovenia.

Romania enforced United Nations' sanctions against Yugoslavia. Despite divisions within the Parliament and among the people, Romania supported NATO in the Kosovo campaign and granted approval for NATO to overfly Romanian airspace. It was the first country to enroll in NATO's Partnership for Peace program, later joining NATO in 2004. The Romanian flag-raising ceremony at NATO headquarters took place on April 2, 2004.

Romania also is a member of the Organization for Security and Cooperation in Europe (OSCE) and the North Atlantic Cooperation Council (NACC).

In August 2014, Romanian President Traian Băsescu called on NATO countries to send arms to the Ukrainian army.

Romania contains one of the weakest strategic points of NATO, the Focșani Gate. This is an area poorly linked to the rest of Europe, from which other regions of Romania and Europe can be attacked.

== NATO Force Integration Unit Romania ==
The NATO Force Integration Unit Romania (Unitatea de Integrare a Forțelor NATO din România) or ROU NFIU is a multinational military command structure on the territory of Romania and represents one of the 8 similar commands existing on the NATO Eastern Flank, which link the organization with the host countries. The role of these units is to provide support so that NATO forces reach their destination and are prepared for the assigned missions.

Its role is thus to facilitate the reception, stationing, training and coordination of NATO military forces, and then to assist them in their integration with NATO partners and the military forces of the host country, so that their mission is fulfilled.

=== History ===
The decision to establish six such commands (in Bulgaria at Sofia, Estonia in Tallinn, Latvia in Riga, Lithuania in Vilnius, Poland in Bydgoszcz and Romania in Bucharest) was taken at the 2014 Wales NATO summit (where the Readiness Action Plan was approved), as NATO's response to changes in the security environment and threats coming from the east and south of the Europe. The task of determining the locations fell to the North Atlantic Council.

The Romanian Unit was inaugurated on 2 July 2015 (1 September 2025 according to another source, together with the other 5 mentioned above), reaching its planned level of capability in June 2016, prior to the NATO summit in Warsaw (the last 2 commands, the one in Hungary in Székesfehérvár and the one in Slovakia in Bratislava were activated on 1 September 2016).

=== Structure ===
It is located in Bucharest and its staffing structure (similar to other units of this type) includes 40 positions, of which 20 are assigned to the host country and 20 to NATO allies, on a rotational basis. The Romanian unit is staffed by officers, warrant officers and specialist non-commissioned officers from a total of 12 contributing states, including Romania: Albania, Bulgaria, Germany, Greece, United Kingdom, Poland, Spain, Portugal, USA, Turkey and Hungary.

It reports to the Supreme Allied Commander Europe, along with other similar units, operationally through the Headquarters Multinational Corps Southeast (which also commands the NATO Force Integration Unit in Bulgaria), in turn reporting to Joint Force Command Naples.

The personnel are paid for by each of the deploying nations, while the construction and maintenance costs of the buildings in which the unit's activities are carried out are borne by the host nation. There are also costs covered by common funding among the other NATO members, such as, for example, that of collectively owned equipment.

=== Role ===
In context, NFIU Romania represents a permanent presence of the Alliance on Romanian territory, but it is not a military base and does not have military units at its disposal.

It has a coordinating role, in cooperation with the host nation, regarding the rapid deployment of NATO forces with a Very High Readiness Joint Task Force and other elements of the NATO Response Force, to its territory. The unit must identify the existing logistical and transport needs of those forces, so that their deployment can be done at very short notice, if necessary.

The unit also intervenes in supporting operations related to the planning and exercise of the activation of Article V of the North Atlantic Treaty, as well as in ensuring their coherence, in relation to the planning of Romania's national defense. It also coordinates and assists multinational military exercises and training, on Romanian territory and provides support, where appropriate, to other NATO operations agreed by the host country. It also supports ongoing military assurance measures, including the preparation necessary for the reception, integration and operational support of combat and combat support units.

== NATO Counterintelligence Detachment ==
The NATO Counterintelligence Detachment Bucharest (Detașamentul NATO de Contrainformații de la București), officially the ACCI BUCHAREST DETACHMENT – BuDET is a counterintelligence structure of the North Atlantic Treaty Organization, which operates in the Bucharest Garrison under the Multinational Division South East.

Its establishment was included in the package of measures decided at the 2016 Warsaw NATO summit, which aimed to ensure the Adaptable Forward Presence on NATO's southeastern flank and stipulated the creation of NATO command and control structures on Romanian territory.

The detachment is subordinate to the Allied Command Counterintelligence.

== NATO HUMINT Centre Of Excellence ==
The NATO HUMINT Centre of Excellence in Oradea is an international Centre of Excellence of the North Atlantic Treaty Organization, specializing in the field of human intelligence.

=== History ===
NATO Centres of Excellence are national or multinational military organizational entities that are not part of its command structure and can provide recognized expertise and experience in support of the Alliance, particularly in support of its transformation.

Romania submitted its bid to serve as the framework nation for the establishment of such a center in the field of human intelligence in 2005, with the bid supported by the Military Intelligence Directorate within the General Directorate for Defense Intelligence (DGIA). On December 16, 2009, the participating nations signed the documents regarding the center's establishment in Norfolk, USA.

It was subsequently established, based on Decision No. 12 of the Romanian Parliament dated June 26, 2008, and holds the status of an international organization. The center was inaugurated on March 16, 2010.

Over time, it established itself as an opinion leader and the primary source of expertise within NATO in its specific field of activity, and in 2015, it was designated by the NATO Military Committee as the department head for HUMINT education and training within the Alliance.

=== Role ===
Its role is to serve as a NATO reference point for education and training activities, as well as for the development of standardized policies and procedures in the field of HUMINT. It is also tasked with supporting the Alliance in shaping the evolution of its capabilities within this same domain.

Mission-readiness training courses in intelligence gathering, aimed at military personnel, were designed to last between five days and four weeks. These courses are NATO accredited.

The Center also conducts research and development projects, including in cooperation with academic institutions.

=== Structure ===
The institution is located in Oradea, housed in an old barracks, specifically, the former building of the local reconnaissance and sabotage unit. In addition to specialized equipment and classrooms, the center features conference rooms, accommodation facilities, shooting ranges, and training areas tailored to its activities.

It operates under the authority of Allied Command Transformation. The Czech Republic, Greece, Poland, Slovakia, Slovenia, the United States of America, Turkey, and Hungary contribute financially and with personnel to the center's activities.

== Romania's foreign relations with NATO member states ==
- Albania
- Belgium
- Bulgaria
- Canada
- Croatia
- Czech Republic
- Denmark
- Estonia
- Finland
- France
- Germany
- Greece
- Hungary
- Iceland
- Italy
- Latvia
- Lithuania
- Luxembourg
- Montenegro
- Netherlands
- North Macedonia
- Norway
- Poland
- Portugal
- Slovakia
- Slovenia
- Spain
- Sweden
- Turkey
- United Kingdom
- United States

== See also ==
- Foreign relations of Romania
- Foreign relations of NATO
