= Foreign relations of Romania =

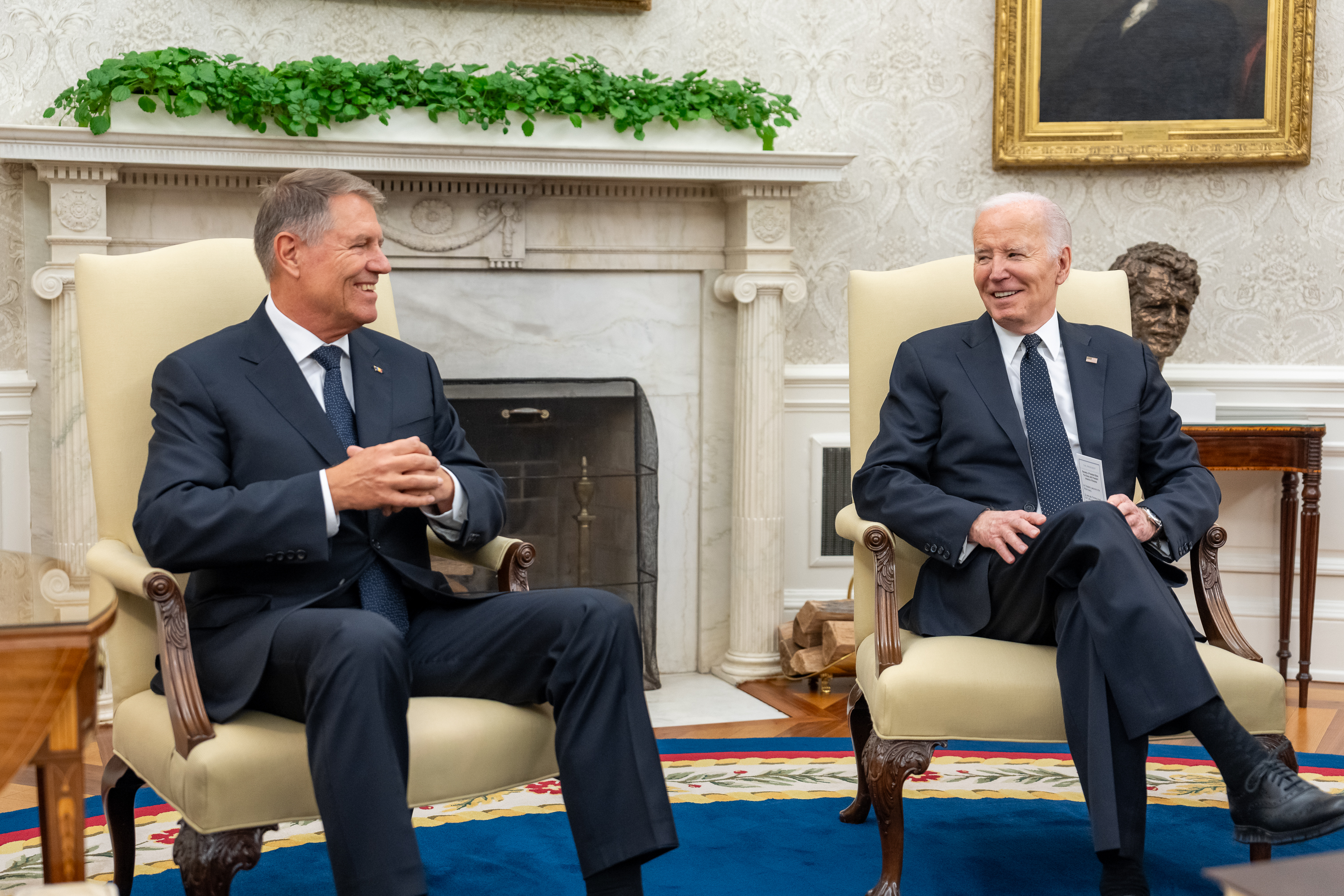
Former Romanian president Klaus Iohannis with former American president Joe Biden, 7 May 2024

The foreign relations of Romania is the policy arm of the Government of Romania which guides its interactions with other nations, their citizens and foreign organizations, as well as its status as a member of the European Union, NATO and other international organizations Romania is part of.

Previously a totalitarian state that has faced a revolution and changed its regime at the end of the Cold War, Romania transitioned to a foreign policy centered on Euro-Atlantic integration. Romania joined NATO on 29 March 2004, and the European Union on 1 January 2007, which inadvertently led to positive relations with countries affiliated with those blocks and diminishing of relations with former communist allies such as North Korea, China, Russia or states from the Middle East.

Romania is often classified as a middle power given its strategic geographic position, economic growth capabilities and participation in multilateral institutions that shape geopolitical outcomes of major importance. Romania fosters regional cooperation through initiatives such as BSEC, the Three Seas Initiative, Bucharest Nine, Craiova Group and is also part of the Schengen Area.

As a semi-presidential state widely recognized as democratic, Romania prioritizes multilateralism, collective security and democratic values and maintains close to very close relations with each of its five neighbours given mutual past cooperation, culture or other aspects.

== Diplomatic relations ==
List of countries which Romania maintains diplomatic relations with:

#	Country	Date
1	Russia	24 October 1878
2	Serbia	26 April 1879
3	Bulgaria	27 July 1879
4	Italy	26 December 1879
5	Greece	9 January 1880
6	Netherlands	12 February 1880
7	France	20 February 1880
8	United Kingdom	20 February 1880
9	Belgium	29 March 1880
10	United States	14 June 1880
11	Spain	5 July 1881
12	Japan	18 June 1902
13	Iran	24 July 1902
14	Egypt	1 April 1906
15	Luxembourg	5 December 1910
16	Switzerland	9 May 1911
17	Albania	28 December 1913
18	Sweden	18 March 1916
19	Denmark	26 April 1917
20	Norway	3 May 1917
21	Portugal	25 August 1917
22	Poland	22 June 1919
23	Czech Republic	1 September 1919
24	Finland	28 June 1920
25	Hungary	21 August 1920
26	Austria	27 August 1920
27	Turkey	20 April 1924
28	Chile	5 February 1925
29	Cuba	13 April 1927
—	Holy See	10 May 1927
30	Brazil	7 January 1928
31	Argentina	12 March 1928
—	Sovereign Military Order of Malta	December 1932
32	Uruguay	24 July 1935
33	Mexico	26 July 1935
34	Venezuela	30 December 1935
35	Peru	10 October 1939
36	Israel	11 June 1948
37	North Korea	26 October 1948
38	India	14 December 1948
39	China	5 October 1949
40	Vietnam	3 February 1950
41	Indonesia	20 February 1950
42	Mongolia	29 April 1950
43	Syria	9 August 1955
44	Sudan	17 January 1956
45	Myanmar	15 March 1956
46	Iceland	16 May 1956
47	Ethiopia	2 July 1957
48	Sri Lanka	15 September 1957
49	Yemen	17 December 1957
50	Afghanistan	5 June 1958
51	Iraq	14 August 1958
52	Guinea	14 November 1958
53	Cyprus	13 November 1960
54	Mali	1 December 1960
55	Ghana	10 August 1961
56	Morocco	20 February 1962
57	Algeria	16 April 1962
58	Benin	29 June 1962
59	Laos	28 November 1962
60	Cambodia	10 January 1963
61	Kuwait	10 June 1963
62	Tunisia	16 December 1963
63	Sierra Leone	15 January 1964
64	Tanzania	5 May 1964
65	Pakistan	15 October 1964
66	Lebanon	6 January 1965
67	Mauritania	15 January 1965
68	Jordan	2 April 1965
69	Somalia	10 July 1965
70	Rwanda	15 July 1965
71	Senegal	5 November 1965
72	Republic of the Congo	21 August 1966
73	Democratic Republic of the Congo	14 October 1966
74	Nigeria	12 November 1966
75	Germany	31 January 1967
76	Canada	4 April 1967
77	Ivory Coast	18 May 1967
78	Singapore	30 May 1967
79	Colombia	15 November 1967
80	Central African Republic	6 February 1968
81	Australia	18 March 1968
82	Burkina Faso	13 April 1968
83	Nepal	20 April 1968
84	Zambia	28 May 1968
85	Malta	7 June 1968
86	Kenya	22 June 1968
87	Burundi	8 August 1968
88	Madagascar	10 September 1968
89	Ecuador	12 November 1968
90	Malaysia	22 March 1969
91	Uganda	27 April 1969
92	Niger	20 June 1969
93	Chad	15 July 1969
94	New Zealand	13 October 1969
95	Bolivia	18 October 1969
96	Cameroon	14 May 1970
97	Costa Rica	4 July 1970
98	Togo	12 January 1971
99	Gambia	30 July 1971
100	Panama	5 October 1971
101	Botswana	7 October 1971
102	Philippines	28 February 1972
103	Equatorial Guinea	9 March 1972
104	Liberia	30 April 1972
105	Bangladesh	29 June 1972
106	Gabon	21 September 1972
107	Trinidad and Tobago	25 November 1972
108	Thailand	1 June 1973
109	Guyana	20 June 1973
110	Honduras	11 July 1973
111	Guinea-Bissau	16 November 1973
112	Libya	14 February 1974
113	Oman	1 May 1974
114	Mauritius	25 June 1974
115	Jamaica	21 August 1974
116	Grenada	3 April 1975
117	Lesotho	1 May 1975
118	Mozambique	25 June 1975
119	São Tomé and Príncipe	12 July 1975
120	Fiji	15 August 1975
121	Cape Verde	17 September 1975
122	Suriname	25 November 1975
123	Angola	19 December 1975
124	Papua New Guinea	19 May 1976
125	Seychelles	30 June 1976
126	Comoros	12 August 1976
127	Barbados	1 September 1977
128	Djibouti	18 June 1978
129	Nicaragua	6 January 1979
130	Maldives	31 October 1979
131	Saint Lucia	15 November 1979
132	El Salvador	17 December 1979
133	Zimbabwe	18 April 1980
134	Haiti	9 May 1980
135	Dominican Republic	25 July 1984
136	Malawi	15 July 1985
—	State of Palestine	14 January 1989
137	United Arab Emirates	1 August 1989
138	Namibia	21 March 1990
139	South Korea	30 March 1990
140	Ireland	18 April 1990
141	Qatar	22 October 1990
142	Guatemala	7 December 1990
143	Eswatini	12 December 1990
144	Bahrain	1 February 1991
145	Moldova	27 August 1991
146	Estonia	13 September 1991
147	Latvia	13 September 1991
148	Lithuania	13 September 1991
149	South Africa	21 November 1991
150	Armenia	17 December 1991
151	Ukraine	1 February 1992
152	Belarus	14 February 1992
153	Paraguay	28 May 1992
154	Kyrgyzstan	15 June 1992
155	Azerbaijan	19 June 1992
156	Georgia	25 June 1992
157	Kazakhstan	15 July 1992
158	Tajikistan	20 July 1992
159	Turkmenistan	21 July 1992
160	Croatia	27 August 1992
161	Slovenia	28 August 1992
162	Slovakia	1 January 1993
163	Belize	25 March 1993
164	Eritrea	24 November 1993
165	Brunei	15 April 1994
166	North Macedonia	11 January 1995
167	Saudi Arabia	13 March 1995
168	San Marino	20 June 1995
169	Uzbekistan	6 October 1995
170	Marshall Islands	29 January 1996
171	Bosnia and Herzegovina	29 February 1996
172	Andorra	6 June 1996
173	Liechtenstein	12 December 1997
174	Timor-Leste	20 December 2002
175	Saint Vincent and the Grenadines	22 May 2003
176	Samoa	2 March 2006
177	Tuvalu	12 May 2006
178	Montenegro	9 August 2006
179	Bahamas	18 June 2007
180	Monaco	19 March 2008
181	Dominica	30 January 2009
182	Saint Kitts and Nevis	25 June 2009
183	Solomon Islands	1 February 2011
184	Nauru	2 March 2011
185	South Sudan	17 April 2013
186	Palau	16 February 2018
187	Antigua and Barbuda	5 April 2018
188	Vanuatu	1 June 2018
189	Kiribati	9 July 2018
190	Federated States of Micronesia	5 February 2019
191	Tonga	11 April 2023

== Relations by continent ==
=== Multilateral ===
Organization	Formal Relations Began	Notes
European Union	The 1970s.	See 2007 enlargement of the European Union Romania is widely recognized to be the first communist state to maintain relations with the European Union and has been the sole communist state part of the Warsaw Pact to have friendly relations with the West. Romania signed its Europe Agreement on 1 February 1993, and has submitted its official application for membership in the European Union on 22 June 1995, alongside the Snagov Declaration, signed a day prior as a declaration of all major fourteen political parties of the country at that moment that they commit to consider the European integration as a key policy of each of them. During the early 2000s, Romania (as well as Bulgaria, the other country part of the same wave of accession) implemented various reforms in order to be eligible for European integration, and on 17 December 2004, it has received its final accession date. Romania joined the European Union as a full member on 1 January 2007.
NATO	The 1990s.	See Romania in NATO As a former member of the Eastern Bloc, relations with NATO in the second part of the 20th century for Romania were mostly negative, but took a drastic turn after the transition to a democratic government in 1989. In the early 1990s, Romania became a key ally of NATO given its desire to become part of the organization and strategic geopolitic position. Romania became part of the Partnership for Peace on 26 January 1994, and took part in its first NATO exercises in September of the same year, in Poland. It has supported NATO in its peacekeeping missions in countries such as Angola, Bosnia and Herzegovina and Afghanistan and has allowed NATO forces to use its airspace during the NATO bombing of Yugoslavia. Romania was officially invited to join NATO at the Prague Summit of 21–22 November 2002 and became part of the organization on 29 March 2004, alongside Bulgaria, Estonia, Latvia, Lithuania, Slovakia and Slovenia.

=== Europe (Inside the European Union) ===
Romania joined the European Union (EU) on 1 January 2007.

Country	Formal relations began	Notes
Austria	1878-09-23	See Austria–Romania relations: Austria has an embassy in Bucharest.; Romania has an embassy in Vienna and a consulate-general in Salzburg.; Both countries are full members of the European Union.
Bulgaria	1879-07-28	See Bulgaria–Romania relations: Bulgaria has an embassy in Bucharest.; Romania has an embassy in Sofia.; Both countries are full members of the European Union and NATO. Bulgaria and Romania were in the same wave of accession and joined the European Union together on January 1, 2007.; Bulgaria and Romania are neighbouring countries sharing a 631 km border.
Croatia	1941-05-13	See Croatia–Romania relations: Croatia has an embassy in Bucharest.; Romania has an embassy in Zagreb.; Both countries are full members of the European Union and NATO.
Denmark	1917-04-26	See Denmark–Romania relations: Denmark has an embassy in Bucharest.; Romania has an embassy in Copenhagen.; Both countries are full members of the European Union and NATO.
Finland	1920-06-28	See Finland–Romania relations: Finland has an embassy in Bucharest.; Romania has an embassy in Helsinki.; Both countries are full members of the European Union and NATO.
France	1880-02-20	See France–Romania relations: France has an embassy in Bucharest.; Romania has an embassy in Paris and consulates–general in Lyon, Marseille and Strasbourg.; Both countries are full members of the European Union and NATO.
Germany	1880-02-20	See Germany–Romania relations: Germany has an embassy in Bucharest and consulates in Sibiu and Timișoara.; Romania has an embassy in Berlin and consulates-general in Bonn, Munich and Stuttgart.; Both countries are full members of the European Union and NATO.
Greece	1880-01-08	See Greece–Romania relations: Greece has an embassy in Bucharest.; Romania has an embassy in Athens and an consulate–general in Thessaloniki.; Both countries are full members of the European Union and NATO.
Hungary	1920-08-21	See Hungary–Romania relations: Hungary has an embassy in Bucharest and consulates-general in Cluj-Napoca and Miercurea Ciuc.; Romania has an embassy in Budapest and consulates-general in Gyula and Szeged.; Both countries are full members of the European Union and NATO.; Hungary and Romania are neighbouring countries sharing a 440 km border.; Ethnic Hungarians represent the largest minority in Romania, accounting for about 6% of the total population.
Ireland	1990-04-18	See Ireland–Romania relations: Ireland has an embassy in Bucharest.; Romania has an embassy in Dublin.; Both countries are full members of the European Union.
Italy	1879-12-06	See Italy–Romania relations: Italy has an embassy in Bucharest.; Romania has an embassy in Rome, consulates-general in Bari, Bologna, Milan, Trieste, Turin and a consulate in Catania.; Both countries are full members of the European Union and NATO.; Romanians represent the largest foreign community in Italy, at about 20% of all foreign citizens living in Italy.
Lithuania	1924-08-21	See Lithuania–Romania relations: Lithuania has an embassy in Bucharest.; Romania has an embassy in Vilnius. The Romanian Embassy in Vilnius is accredited to Latvia as well.; Both countries are full members of the European Union and NATO.
Netherlands	1880-01-24	See Netherlands–Romania relations: The Netherlands has an embassy in Bucharest.; Romania has an embassy in The Hague.; Both countries are full members of the European Union and NATO.
Poland	1919-02-22	See Poland–Romania relations: Poland has an embassy in Bucharest.; Romania has an embassy in Warsaw.; Both countries are full members of the European Union and NATO.
Portugal	1917-08-31	See Portugal–Romania relations: Portugal has an embassy in Bucharest.; Romania has an embassy in Lisbon.; Both countries are full members of the European Union and NATO.
Slovakia	1993-01-01	See Romania–Slovakia relations: Romania has an embassy in Bratislava.; Slovakia has an embassy in Bucharest.; Both countries are full members of the European Union and NATO.
Slovenia	1992-08-28	See Romania–Slovenia relations: Romania has an embassy in Ljubljana.; Slovenia has an embassy in Bucharest.; Both countries are full members of the European Union and NATO.
Spain	1881-07-05	See Romania–Spain relations: Romania has an embassy in Madrid.; Spain has an embassy in Bucharest.; Both countries are full members of the European Union and NATO.
Sweden	1916-03-18	See Romania–Sweden relations: Romania has an embassy in Stockholm.; Sweden has an embassy in Bucharest.; Both countries are full members of the European Union and NATO.

=== Europe (Outside of the European Union) ===
Country	Formal relations began	Notes
Albania	1913-12-28	See Albania–Romania relations
Armenia	1991-12-17	See Armenia–Romania relations: Armenia has an embassy in Bucharest.; Romania has an embassy in Yerevan.; Both countries are full members of the Council of Europe.
Belarus	1992-02-14	See Belarus–Romania relations
Bosnia and Herzegovina	1996-03-01	See Bosnia and Herzegovina–Romania relations
Georgia	1921-02-18	See Georgia–Romania relations
Holy See	1920-06-12	See Holy See–Romania relations
Moldova	1991-08-27	See Moldova–Romania relations: Moldova and Romania enjoy an extraordinary relation ever since Moldova achieved its independence from the Soviet Union in 1991. Moldova is the subject of a popular irredentist movement in Romania calling for Moldova's incorporation in Romania, Pan-Romanianism being a key feature in politics of both countries.; Moldova has been part of modern Romania from 1918 to 1940. Romanian is the official language of Moldova. Moldovans and Romanians share common traditions, folklore and are often considered the same ethnic group.; Romania and Moldova are neighbouring countries sharing 681 km of border. Romania is a member state of the European Union, while Moldova is a candidate since 2022. Romania is a strong supporter of Moldova's European integration.; Romania has an embassy in Chișinău, consulate-generals in Chișinău, Bălți and Cahul and a consular office in Ungheni. Moldova has an embassy in Bucharest, a consulate-general in Iași and honorary-consulates in Timișoara, Cluj-Napoca and Baia Mare.; Moldovans represent the biggest foreign ethnic group that are the subject of immigration to Romania, accounting for more than 40% of foreign-born residents of Romania. Around 30% of Moldova's residents hold Romanian citizenship as a result of citizenship laws passed by the Government of Romania.
Montenegro	2006-08-09	See Montenegro–Romania relations
Norway	1917-05-03	See Norway–Romania relations
Russia	1878-10-12	See Romania–Russia relations: As a member of the European Union and NATO, Romania is on Russia's "unfriendly country list"
Serbia	1841-04-19	See Romania–Serbia relations: Romania and Serbia are neighbouring countries sharing 546 km of border. Romania is a member state of the European Union, while Serbia is a candidate since 2012. Romania is a strong supporter of Serbia's European integration.; Romania has an embassy in Belgrade and a consulate-general in both Vršac and Zaječar. Serbia has an embassy in Bucharest and a consulate-general in Timișoara.; Romania and Serbia have traditionally held close relations between them and achieved independence from the Ottoman Empire at the same time.; Romania is a strong supporter of Serbia's territorial integrity and is one of the five countries member of the European Union that has not recognized Kosovo's declaration of independence from Serbia in 2008.; Romanian is one of the official languages in Serbia's Autonomous Province of Vojvodina.
Sovereign Military Order of Malta	1992	See Foreign relations of the Sovereign Military Order of Malta: The diplomatic representation of Romania with SMOM is handled by the Romanian embassy in the Vatican (Holy See).; Sovereign Military Order of Malta has an embassy in Bucharest.
Switzerland	1911-05-09	See Romania–Switzerland relations
Turkey	1879-10-22	See Romania–Turkey relations: Romania has an embassy in Ankara and consulates-general in Istanbul and İzmir.; Turkey has an embassy in Bucharest and consulates-general in Constanța.; Both countries are full members of NATO.
Ukraine	1918-02-09	See Romania–Ukraine relations: Romania and Ukraine are neighbouring countries sharing 619 km of border. Romania is a member state of the European Union, while Ukraine is a candidate since 2022. Romania is a strong supporter of Ukraine's Euro-Atlantic integration.; Romania has an embassy in Kyiv, a consulate-general in both Chernivtsi and Odesa and a consulate in Solotvyno. Ukraine has an embassy in Bucharest and formerly had a consulate-general in Suceava, that was closed in 2014, with Romania committing to open another consulate-general in Sighetu Marmației.; After Ukraine's independence from the Soviet Union and the Romanian Revolution, the two countries were engaged in a diplomatic skirmish over the territorial waters of each, that was solved in 2009. Nowadays, Romania is a strong supporter of Ukraine's territorial integrity and has intensively aided Ukraine both militarily and humanitarian during its war with Russia, which also saw spillovers on Romanian territory.
United Kingdom	1880-02-20	See Romania–United Kingdom relations Romanian Prime Minister Marcel Ciolacu with British Prime Minister Keir Starmer in 10 Downing Street, November 2024. Romania established diplomatic relations with the United Kingdom on 20 February 1880.: Romania maintains an embassy in London, and consulate generals in Edinburgh and Manchester. Romania also maintains honorary consulates in Hirwaun, Leeds, Morpeth-Newcastle and Southampton.; The United Kingdom is accredited to Romania through its embassy in Bucharest.; Both countries share common membership of the Council of Europe, the International Criminal Court, NATO, the OSCE, and the World Trade Organization. Bilaterally the two countries have a Defence Cooperation Agreement, and a Double Taxation Convention.

=== Asia ===
Country	Formal relations began	Notes
Afghanistan	1958-06-05	See Foreign relations of Afghanistan: Romania has an embassy in Kabul.
Azerbaijan	1992-06-19	See Azerbaijan–Romania relations: Azerbaijan has an embassy in Bucharest.; Romania has an embassy in Baku.; Both countries are full members of the Council of Europe.
China	1949-10-05	See China–Romania relations
Iran	1902-07-24	See Iran–Romania relations: Iran has an embassy in Bucharest.; Romania has an embassy in Tehran.
Iraq	1958-08-14	See Iraq–Romania relations
Israel	1948-06-11	See Israel–Romania relations
North Korea	1948-10-26	See North Korea–Romania relations: Romania has an embassy in Pyongyang.
Lebanon	1965-01-06	See Lebanon–Romania relations: Lebanon has an embassy in Bucharest and an honorary consulate in Constanța.; Romania has an embassy in Beirut an honorary consulate in Tripoli.
Malaysia	1969-03-22	See Malaysia–Romania relations
Palestine	1988-11-17	See Romania–Palestine relations
Pakistan	1964-10-15	See Pakistan–Romania relations
Philippines	1972-03-10	See Philippines–Romania relations
Saudi Arabia	1995-03-13	See Romania–Saudi Arabia relations
Singapore	1967-05-30	See Foreign relations of Singapore In February 2002 the Romanian president Ion Iliescu made an official visit to Singapore. In March 2002 Romania and Singapore signed a double-taxation agreement. In November 2008, Singapore signed an open skies agreement (OSA) with Romania to allow greater flexibility on air services. In 2000, trade between Romania and Singapore was US$15.5 million, roughly balanced. The Romanian market, with a relatively cheap and skilled labor force and advantageous tax laws, has been attractive to several Singapore companies who have established joint ventures in Romania. Forte, created in 1990 as a Romanian-Singapore joint venture for computer assembly, is an example. (However, in 2006 Forte was acquired by Siemens.): Romania has an embassy in Singapore.
South Korea	1990-03-30	See Romania–South Korea relations: The establishment of diplomatic relations between the Romania and South Korea started on 30 March 1990.; South Korea's Investment in Romania in 2012 was about 560 million.; South Korea has an embassy in Bucharest, Romania.; Romania has an embassy in Seoul South Korea.; The number of South Koreans living in Romania is about 500.; Bilateral Trade in 2014; Exports 5.98 billion US dollars; Imports 6.42 billion US dollars; Romanian Ministry of Foreign Affairs about the relations with South Korea; South Korean Ministry of Foreign Affairs and Trade about the relations with Romania; Foreign relations of South Korea#Europe.
Sri Lanka	1957-09-15	See Romania–Sri Lanka relations: Romania has an embassy in Colombo.; Sri Lanka has no diplomatic office in Romania. The Sri Lankan embassy in Warsaw, Poland, has concurrent accreditation to Romania.
Syria	1955-08-09	See Romania–Syria relations
Thailand	1973-06-01	See Foreign relations of Thailand: Romania has an embassy in Bangkok and an honorary consulate in Pattaya.; Thailand has an embassy in Bucharest.
Uzbekistan	1995-10-06	See Romania–Uzbekistan relations

=== Africa: Arab Maghreb Union (AMU) ===
Country	Formal Relations Began	Notes
Morocco	1962-02-20	See Morocco–Romania relations
Tunisia	1963-12-16	See Romania–Tunisia relations

=== Africa: Economic Community of Central African States (ECCAS) ===
Country	Formal Relations Began	Notes
Chad	1969-07-15	See Chad–Romania relations

=== Africa: East African Community (EAC) ===
Country	Formal Relations Began	Notes
Kenya	1968-06-22	See Foreign relations of Kenya Romania opened its embassy in Kenya in 1974.: Romania has an embassy in Nairobi.

=== North America and the Caribbean ===
Country	Formal Relations Began	Notes
Canada	1919-08-19	See Canada–Romania relations: Canada has an embassy in Bucharest.; Romania has an embassy in Ottawa and consulates-general in Montreal, Toronto and Vancouver.
Mexico	1935-07-20	See Mexico–Romania relations: Mexico has an embassy in Bucharest.; Romania has an embassy in Mexico City
United States	1880-06-14	See Romania–United States relations Although diplomatic relations between the two countries started in 1880, the United States recognized Romania's independence on 14 October 1878. The relations were severed between 1941 and 1946 and remained strained until the 1960s. The bilateral relations began improving after the fall of communism in Romania.: Romania has an embassy in Washington, D.C. and consulates-general in Chicago, Los Angeles, Miami and New York City.; United States has an embassy in Bucharest.

=== South and Central America ===
Country	Formal Relations Began	Notes
Argentina	1931-04-24	See Argentina–Romania relations: Romania has an embassy in Buenos Aires and an honorary consulate in Mendoza.; The Argentine Republic has an embassy in Bucharest.
Brazil	1928-01-07	See Brazil–Romania relations: Romania has an embassy in Brasília, a consulate-general in Rio de Janeiro and 6 honorary consulates (in Aracaju, Belo Horizonte, Curitiba, Fortaleza, Porto Alegre and Recife).; Brazil has an embassy in Bucharest.
Chile	1925-02-05	See Chile–Romania relations
Peru	1939-10-10	Main article: Peru–Romania relations: Romania has an embassy in Lima and an honorary consulate in Arequipa.; The Republic of Peru has an embassy and an honorary consulate, both in Bucharest.
Uruguay	1925-07-24	See Romania–Uruguay relations: Romania has an embassy in Montevideo.; The Oriental Republic of Uruguay has an embassy in Bucharest.

=== Oceania ===
Country	Formal Relations Began	Notes
Australia	1968-03-18	See Australia–Romania relations Romania and Australia have concluded an Investment Promotion and Protection Agreement, signed in 1994, a Trade and Economic Agreement (signed with full effect for Australia in July 2002 and for Romania in January 2003) and an Agreement for the Avoidance of Double Taxation and the Prevention of Fiscal Evasion, signed in 2001.: Romania has an embassy in Canberra, a general consulate in Sydney, and an honorary consulate in Melbourne.; The Commonwealth of Australia has no embassy in Romania, only an honorary consulate in Bucharest. The Australian embassy in Athens, Greece, is concurrently accredited to Romania.

== International organisations ==
Romania is a member of the following international organisations:

- Council of Europe
- International Atomic Energy Agency
- International Red Cross and Red Crescent Movement
- International Federation of Red Cross and Red Crescent Societies
- NATO
- United Nations
- International Maritime Organization
- Organization of the Black Sea Economic Cooperation
- Black Sea Trade and Development Bank
- Union for the Mediterranean
- Antarctic Treaty System (without consulting status)
- Asia–Europe Meeting
- European Patent Organisation
- Interpol
- European Space Agency

== See also ==
- List of diplomatic missions in Romania
- List of diplomatic missions of Romania
- List of Romanian diplomats
- Romania's foreign policy in the years preceding the outbreak of the World War I
