= Brazil–Romania relations =

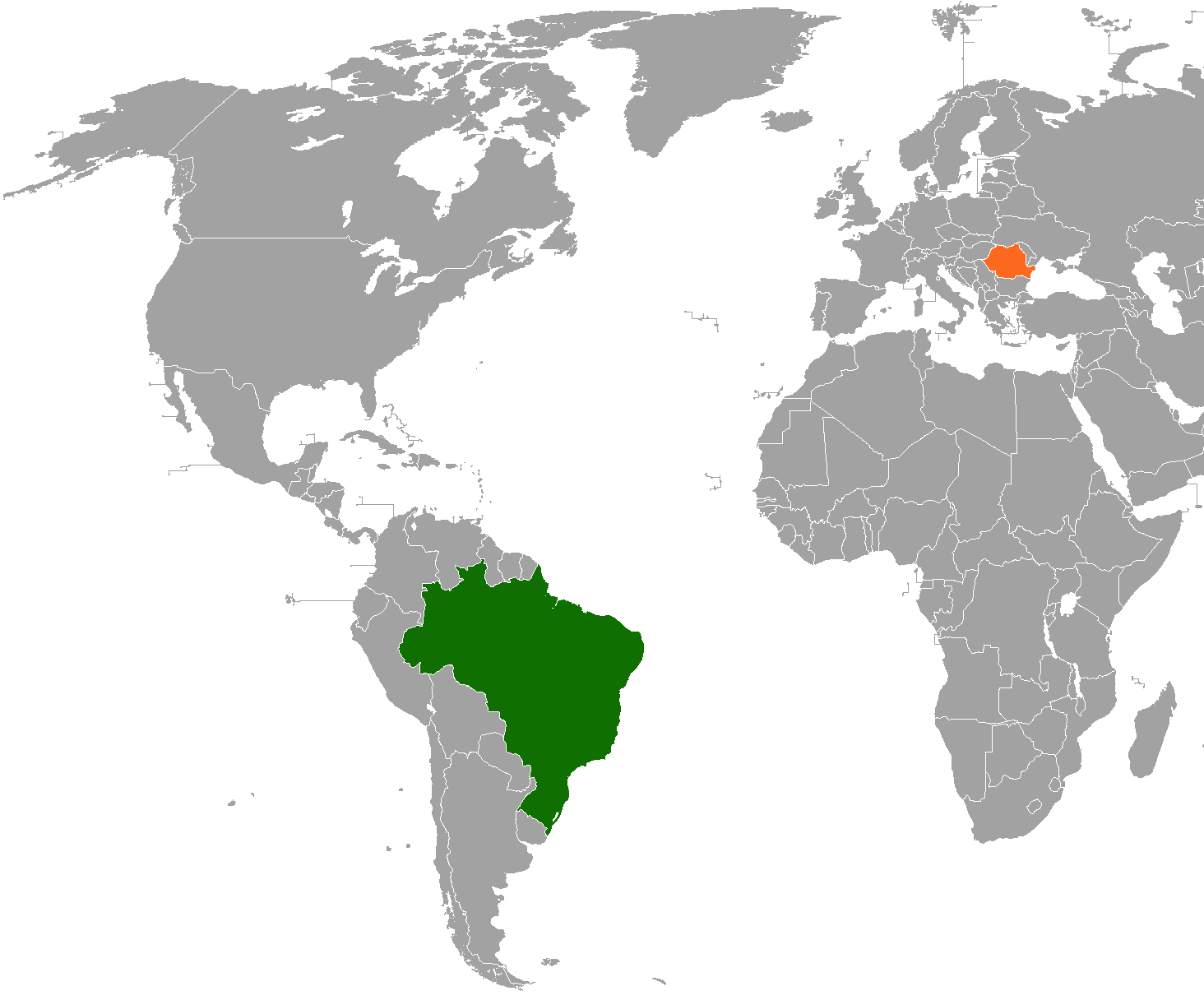
- Brazil: Romania

Brazil–Romania relations are the bilateral relations between Brazil and Romania. Brazil maintains an embassy in Bucharest and Romania maintains an embassy in Brasília and a consulate–general in Rio de Janeiro. Both nations are members of the United Nations.

== History ==
In the beginning of the 20th century, migrants from Romania (and specifically from the Romanian province of Bessarabia (modern-day Moldova)) immigrated to Brazil. Among the Romanians, many were ethnic Germans and Poles who resided in Romania at the time. As a result, over 40,000 Brazilians are of Romanian origin.

Initial contacts between Brazil and Romania were made in 1880. In 1928, both nations established formal diplomatic relations. That same year Romania opened a diplomatic legation in Rio de Janeiro – its first in Latin America. Brazil reciprocated the gesture in 1929. Brazil closed its mission in 1939 with the start of World War II.

In August 1942, Brazil declared war on the Axis powers and as a result broke diplomatic relations with Romania as they were initially allied with Germany. In 1961, Brazil re-established diplomatic relations with Romania and in 1962, Brazil opened a diplomatic legation in Bucharest. In 1974 both nations upgraded their legations to embassies.

In June 1975, Romanian General Secretary Nicolae Ceaușescu paid an official visit to Brazil, the first by a Romanian head-of-state. While in Brazil, Ceaușescu met with Brazilian President Ernesto Geisel and was awarded the Order of the Southern Cross. There would be several more visits by Romanian politicians to Brazil.

In October 2004, Brazilian Vice President José Alencar became the highest level politician to visit Romania. While in Romania he met with Romanian President Ion Iliescu and Alencar was presented with the Order of the Star of Romania. In 2010, Brazilian Foreign Minister Celso Amorim also paid a visit to Romania.

In June 2013, a Friendship Group between the Brazilian and Romanian Parliament was established. The Brazil-Romania Parliamentary Friendship Group was created in the 56th legislature of the Brazilian Chamber of Deputies. In June 2017, a joint political consultation was held between both nations in Brasília.

== High-level Visits ==
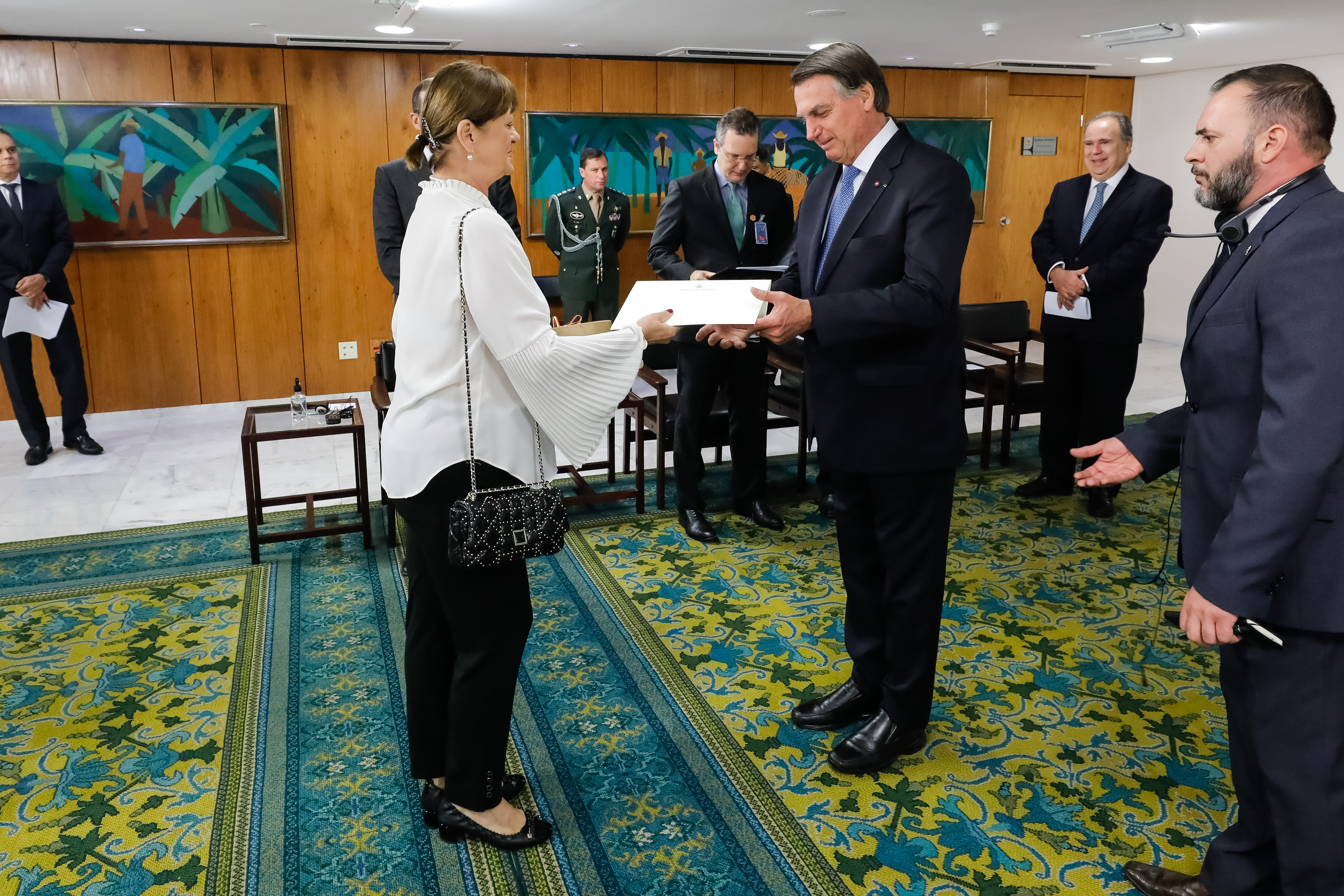
Brazilian President Jair Bolsonaro receiving the credentials of newly appointed Romanian Ambassador Monica-Mihaela Stirbu; October 2021.

High-level visits from Brazil to Romania

- Vice President José Alencar (2004)
- Foreign Minister Celso Amorim (2010)

High-level visits from Romania to Brazil

- General Secretary Nicolae Ceaușescu (1975)
- Prime Minister Petre Roman (1991)
- President Ion Iliescu (1992)
- Prime Minister Nicolae Văcăroiu (1994)
- President Emil Constantinescu (2000)
- Prime Minister Adrian Năstase (2003)

== Bilateral agreements ==
Both nations have signed several bilateral agreements such as an Agreement for the transfer of technology in the pharmaceutical field (1975); Agreement on maritime transport (1977); Agreement on scientific and technological cooperation (1983); Memorandum of Understanding for the establishment of a consultation mechanism between the Ministries of Foreign Affairs of both nations (1991); Cultural agreement (1992); Agreement of cooperation in combating the production and trafficking of drugs and psychotropic substances, drug abuse and addiction (1999); Extradition Agreement (2003); Agreement on the exercise of remunerated activities by family members of the diplomatic, consular, maritime, military, administrative and technical (2010); and an Agreement for mutual legal assistance in criminal matters (2017).

== Resident diplomatic missions ==
Of Brazil

- Bucharest (Embassy)

Of Romania

- Brasília (Embassy)
- Rio de Janeiro (Consulate-General)

Embassy of Brazil in Bucharest

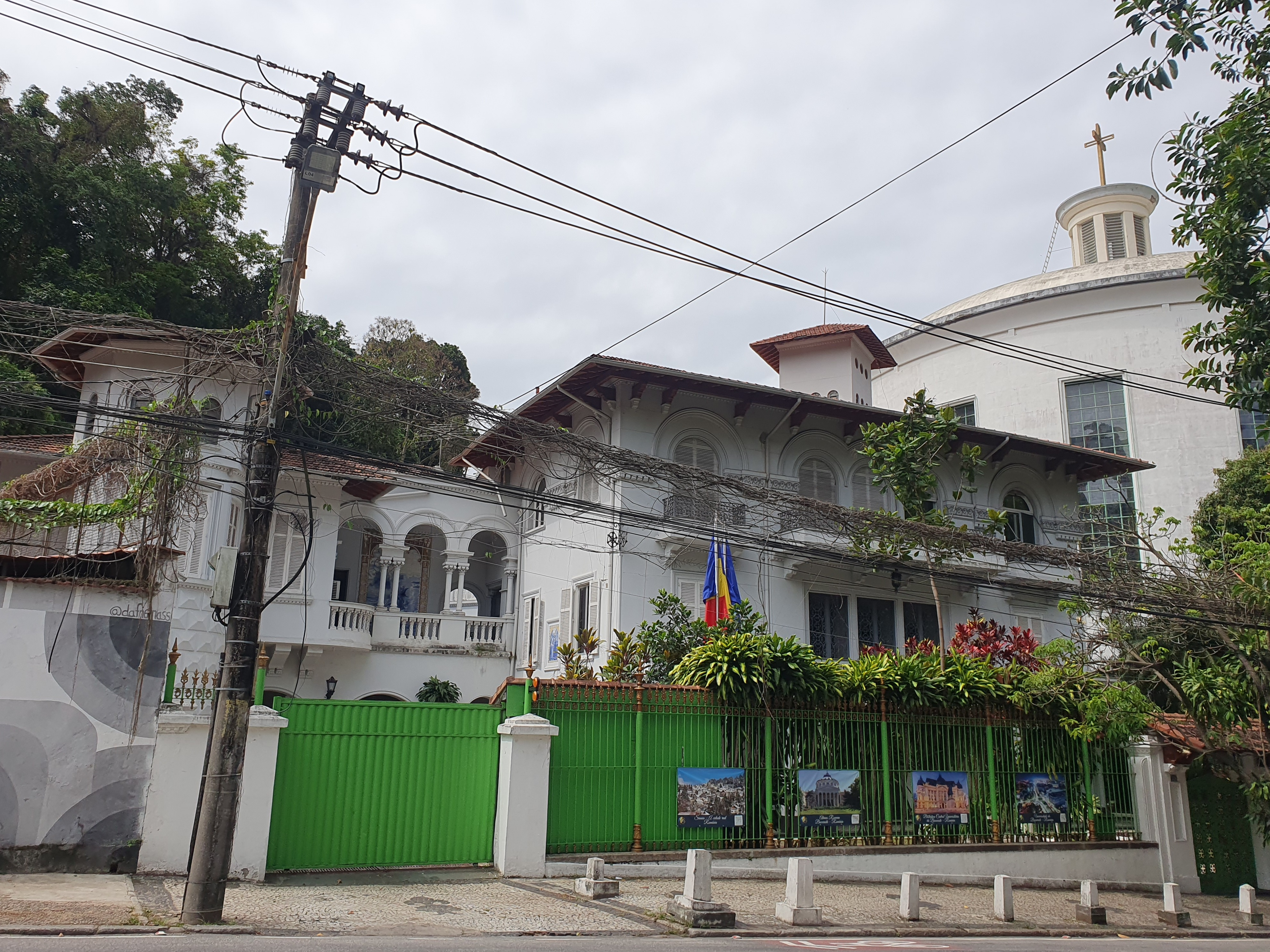
Consulate-General of Romania in Rio de Janeiro

== See also ==
- Foreign relations of Brazil
- Foreign relations of Romania
- Romanian Brazilians
