= Romania–Spain relations =

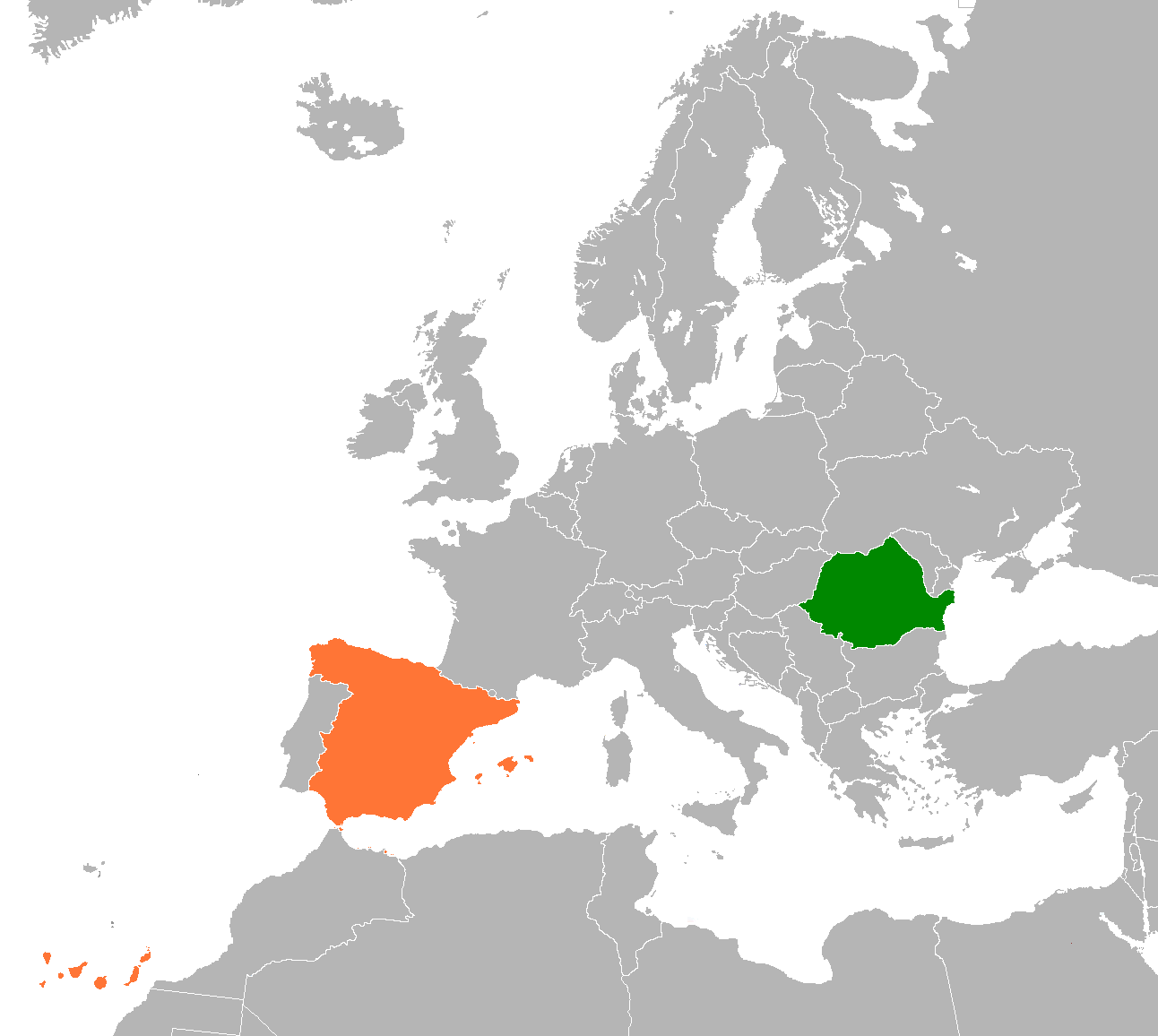
- Romania: Spain

Romania and the Kingdom of Spain maintain bilateral relations. Both nations are members of the Council of Europe, European Union, NATO and the United Nations. Spain has given full support to Romania's membership in the European Union and NATO.

== History ==
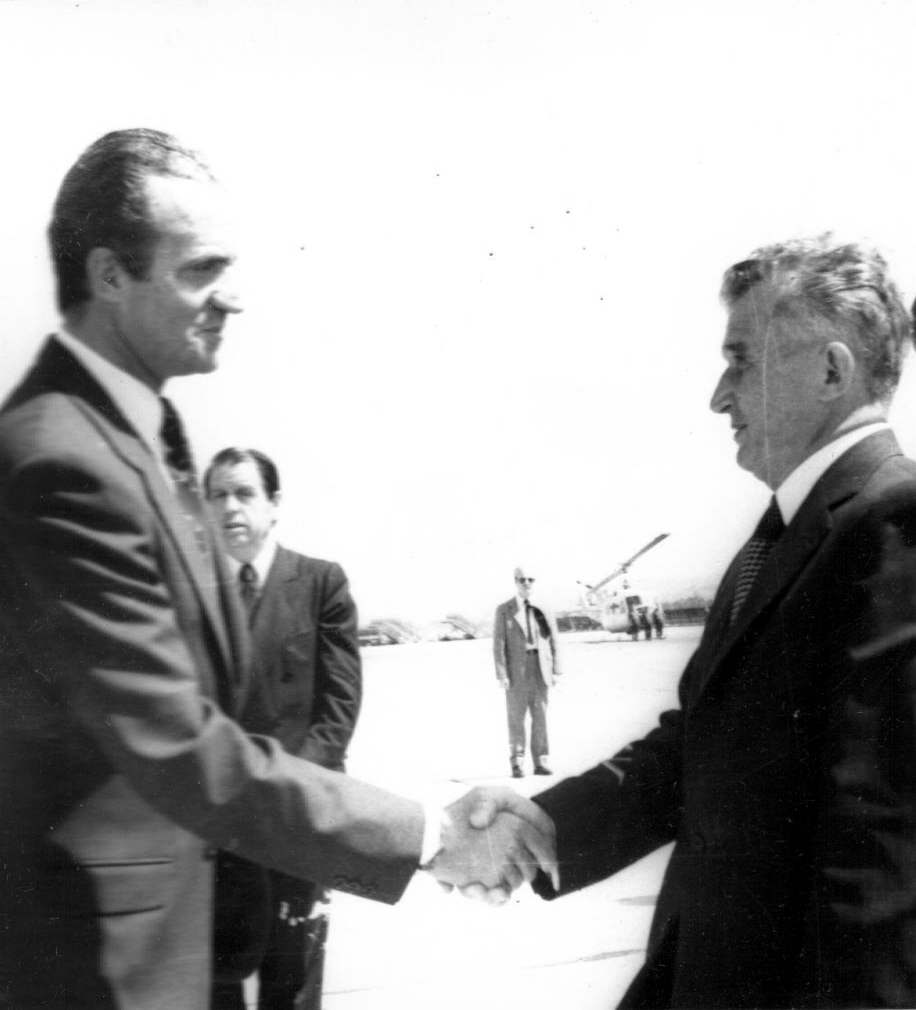
Nicolae Ceaușescu is greeted by King Juan Carlos I of Spain in Madrid; 1979.

Romania and Spain, although countries located at the two extremes of Europe, had at one point been part of the Roman Empire and have had numerous approaches and connections throughout history. The first direct Spanish-Romanian political relations date back to the 15th century, when the Voivode of Transylvania, John Hunyadi and King Alfonso V of Aragon signed a cooperation treaty.

On 12 April 1880, Spain recognized the independence of Romania after the Romanian War of Independence from the Ottoman Empire. In June 1881, a diplomatic Legation from Spain arrived to Bucharest. During the visit, several commercial agreements between the two countries had been signed. In June 1913, the Romanian Legation in Madrid was opened.

On 4 April 1946, the Romanian government broke diplomatic relations with the government of General Francisco Franco and recognized the Spanish Republican government in exile. On 5 January 1967, Romania and Spain signed a consular and commercial agreement and in February 1977 both nations opened resident embassies in each other's capitals, respectively.

Since the end of the Romanian Revolution in 1989, bilateral relations between both nations have increased. Spain supported Romania's entry into the European Union, for which Romania was admitted to in 2007. In June 2016, both nations celebrated 135 years since the establishment of diplomatic relations.

== Bilateral agreements ==
Both nations have signed several bilateral agreements such as an Agreement on the regulation and organization of labor migration flows between both nations (2002); Agreement of Cooperation in the field of protection of unaccompanied Romanian minors in Spain, their repatriation, and the fight against their exploitation (2006); Agreement on Social Security (2006); Agreement of Cooperation in the fight against crime (2007); Security agreement on reciprocal protection of classified information (2011); Agreement on the operation of the Spanish Center of the Cervantes Institute in Bucharest and the Romanian Cultural Institute in Madrid (2012); Memorandum of Understanding between the National Institute of Romanian statistics and the Spanish National Statistical Institute on cooperation in the field of development of new methods and instruments for official statistics (2019); and a Memorandum of Understanding between the Romanian Chamber of Commerce and Industry and the Spanish Chamber of Commerce (2019).

== Resident diplomatic missions ==
- Romania has an embassy in Madrid and has consulates-general in Barcelona, Bilbao, Sevilla and Valencia; consulates in Castellón de la Plana, Ciudad Real, Valencia, Zaragoza and a vice-consulate in Almería.
- Spain has an embassy in Bucharest.

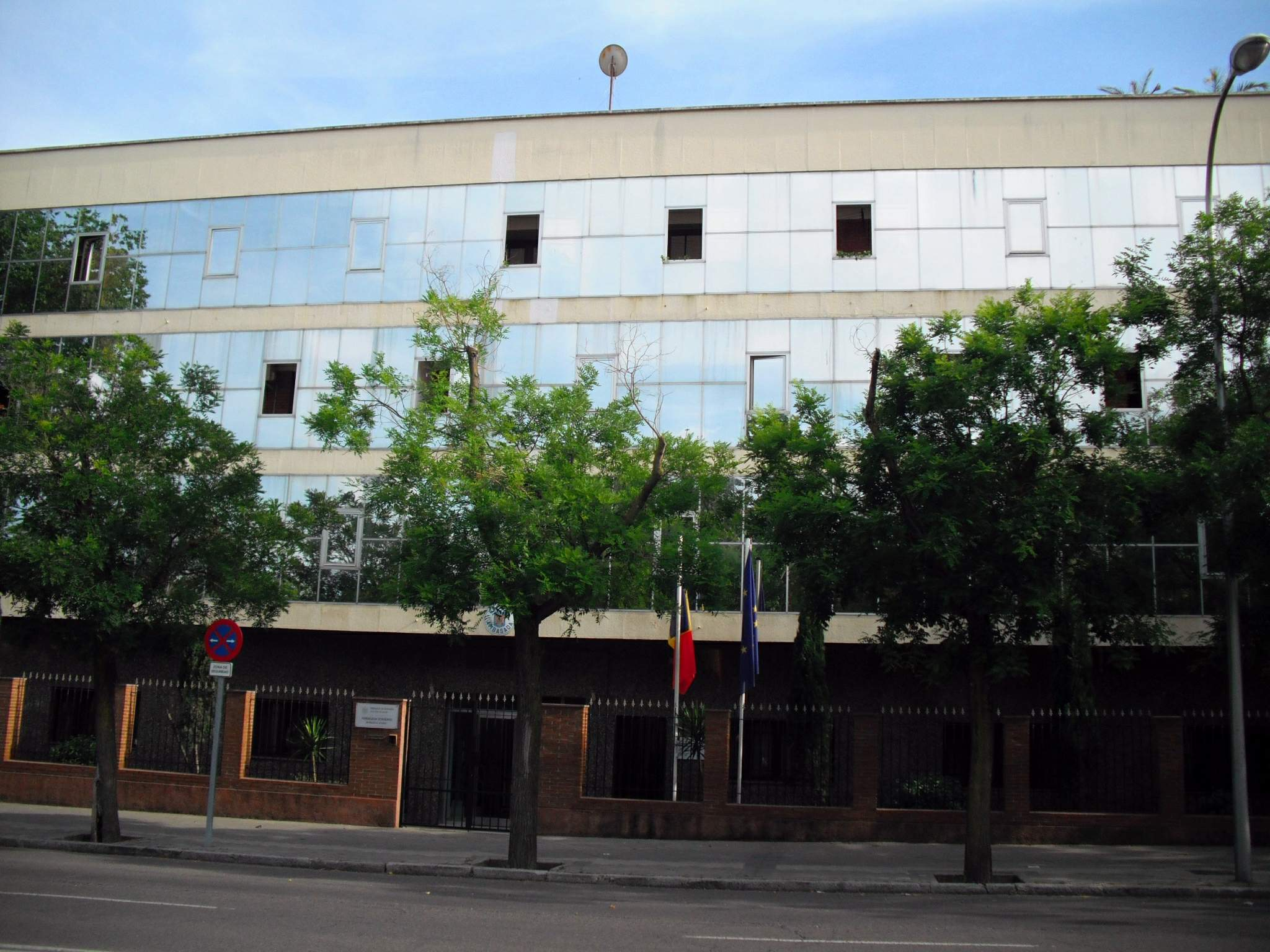
Embassy of Romania in Madrid

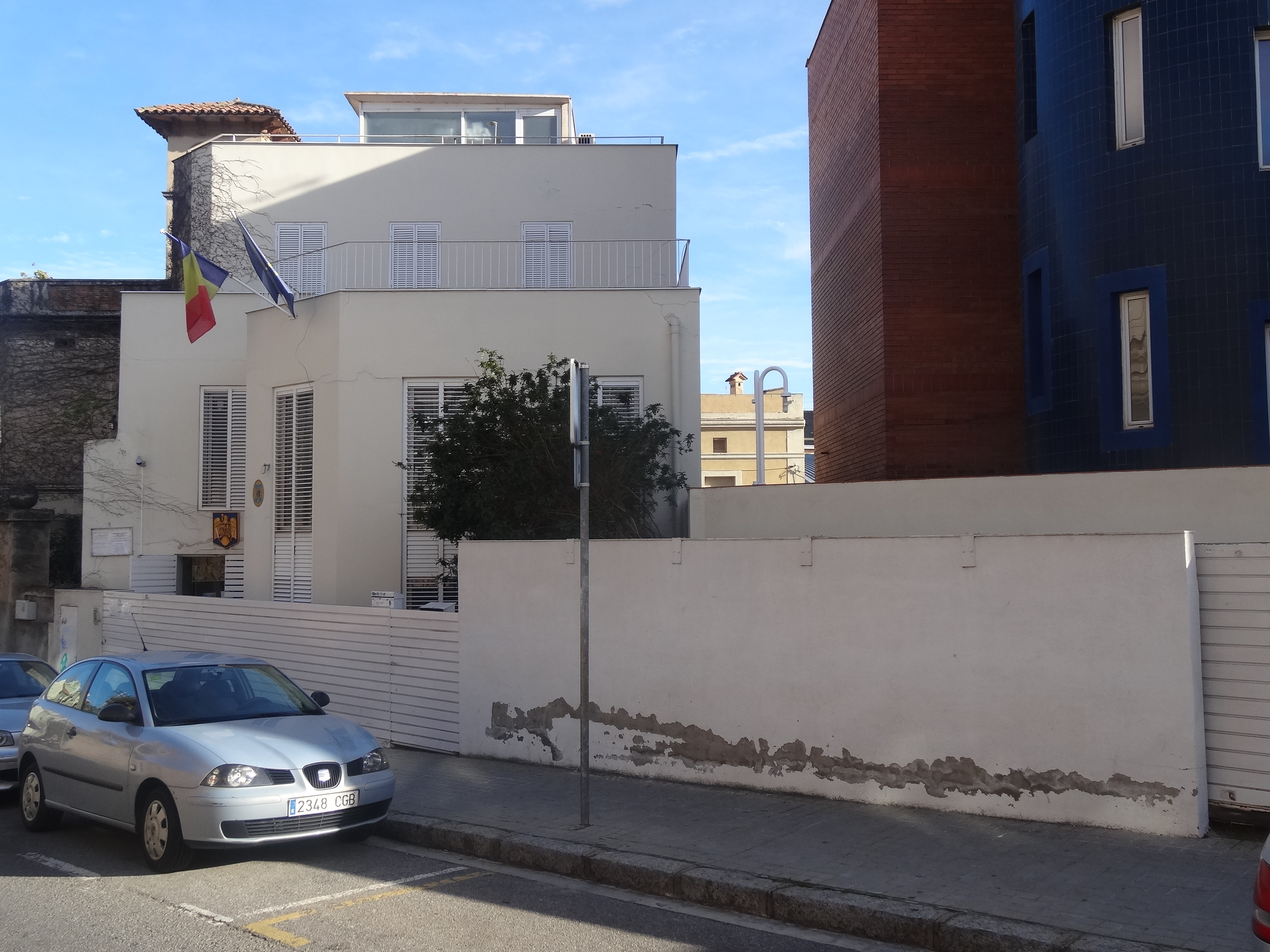
Consulate-General of Romania in Barcelona

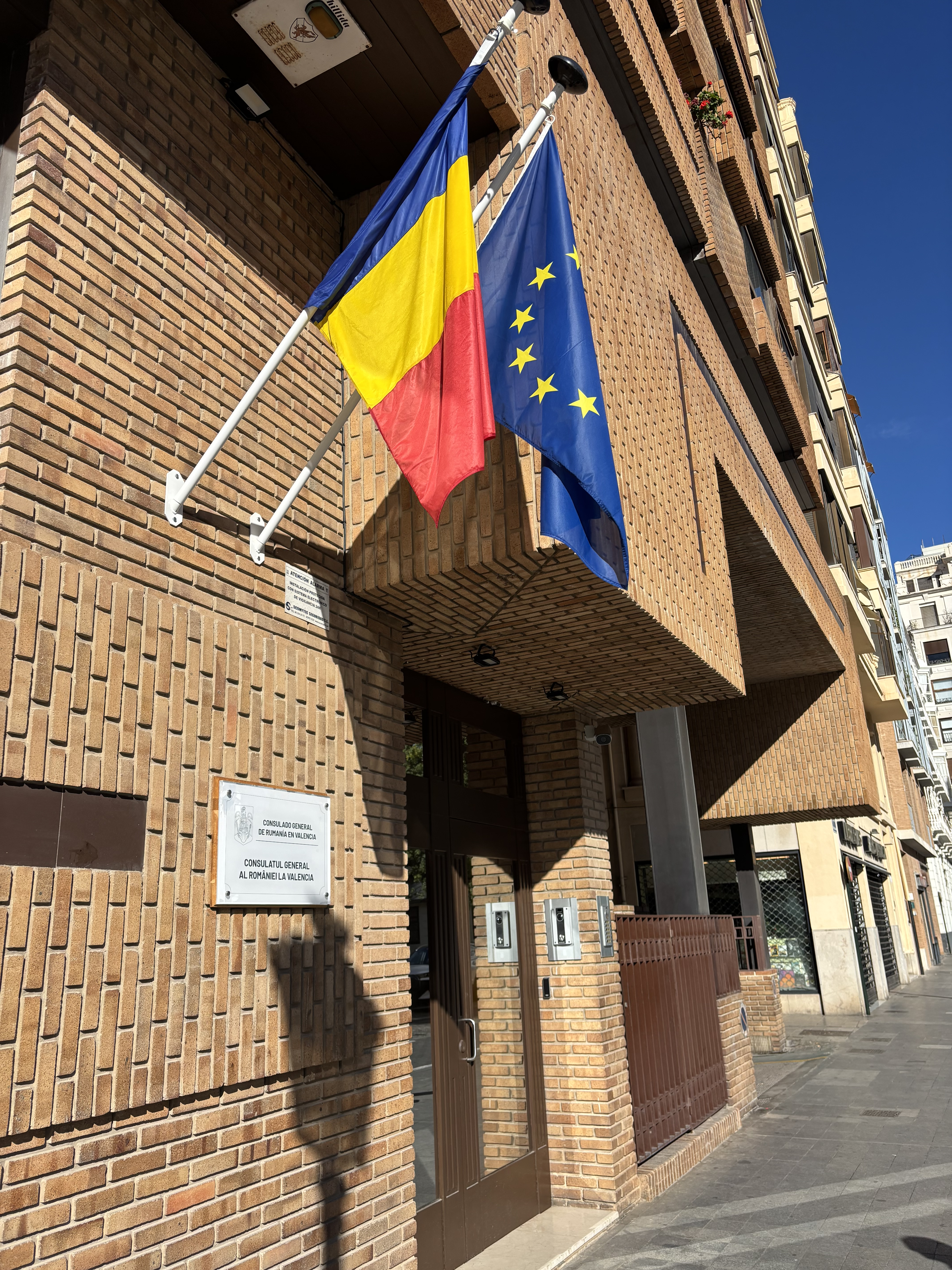
Consulate-General of Romania in Valencia

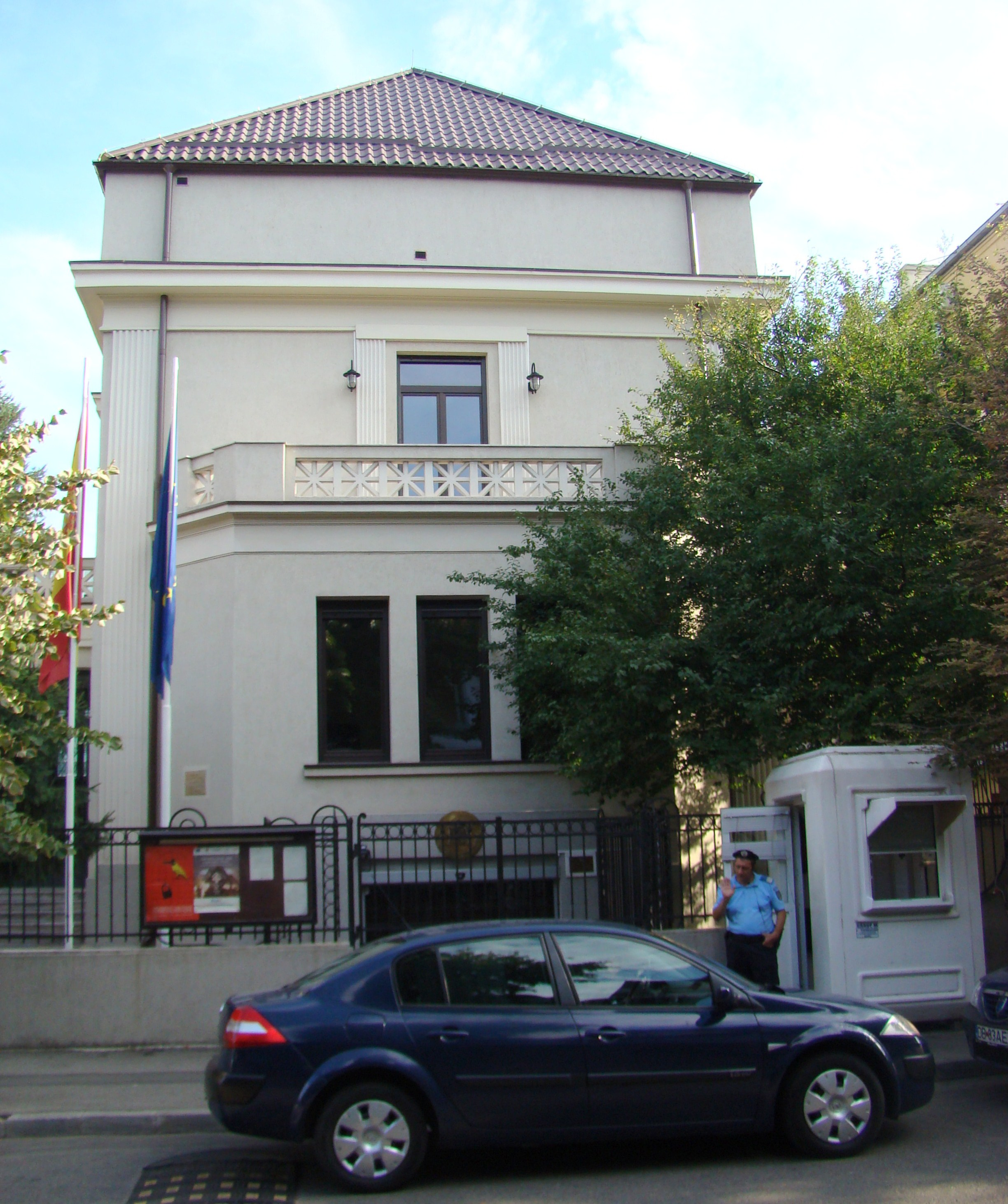
Former building of the Embassy of Spain in Bucharest

== See also ==
- Foreign relations of Romania
- Foreign relations of Spain
- NATO-EU relations
- Romanians in Spain
