= Embassy of Romania, London =

Consulate General of Romania in London
- Address: 22 Glenthorne Rd, London, W6 0PP
- Consul General: Robert Marin
- Website: https://cglondra.mae.ro/

The Consulate General of Romania in London is a consular office / diplomatic mission of Romania in the United Kingdom. Diplomatic relations between the two countries were established in 1880. The Consulate General of Romania in London is located in Hammersmith at 22 Glenthorne Road, Hammersmith, London, United Kingdom.

In London there is also the Embassy of Romania to the United Kingdom of Great Britain and Northern Ireland at 4 Palace Green, London and a Cultural Institute at 1 Belgrave Square, Belgravia.

== See also ==
- Romania–United Kingdom relations
- List of ambassadors of Romania to the United Kingdom
