= Denmark–Romania relations =

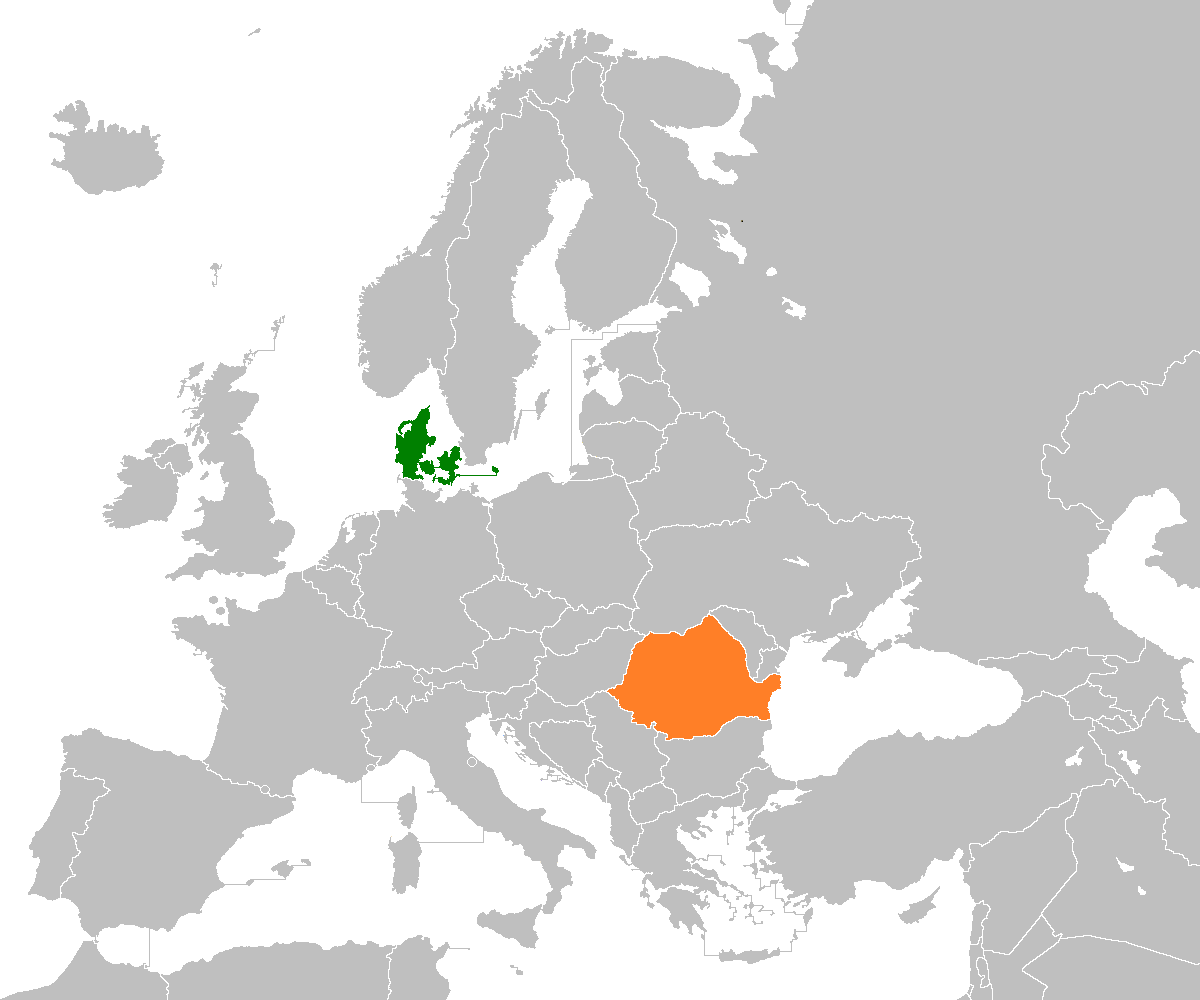
- Denmark: Romania

Denmark–Romania relations refers to the bilateral relations between Denmark and Romania. Denmark has an embassy in Bucharest, and Romania has an embassy in Copenhagen. Relations between Denmark and Communist Romania was described in the 1960s as "good" by Prime Minister of Romania Ion Gheorghe Maurer. Both countries are members of the Council of Europe, the European Union and NATO. Denmark gave full support to Romania's applications for membership in the European Union and NATO.

== History ==
In 1879, two Romanian statesmen under King Carol I of Romania, visited Denmark, establishing the official relations between Denmark and Romania. In 1880, Denmark opened the first consulate in Bucharest, to help Romanians settle in Denmark. The city of Aarhus was the first city Romanians immigrated to. Diplomatic relations between Denmark and Romania were established on 13 April 1917.

During World War I, Denmark opened two prisoner-of-war camps. The reason was to protect, heal and recover Romanian prisoners.

During World War II, when Nazi Germany invaded Denmark, relations between Denmark and Romania were suspended. In 1946, relations were re-established. In 1965, a payments agreement was signed. In 1967, an economic, industrial and technical cooperation agreement was signed. In 1980 and in 1994, both countries signed an investment agreement.

From 1975 to 1989, the number of Romanian asylum applications in Denmark totaled 505. In 2008, 246 Romanians immigrated to Denmark while in 2011, 710 Romanians immigrated to Denmark. In three years, Romanian immigration rose 289 percent.

== Cooperation ==
In 2003, Denmark and Romania agreed to cooperate on a climate project, the first Danish project in Eastern Europe. The project assists Romania with replacing wood waste products for new technology, to provide heating to the poor regions of Romania.

== Economic relations ==
In 2008, Danish export to Romania amounted 1,644 million DKK, while Romanian export amounted 475 million DKK.

== High level visits ==
In May 2000, Queen Margrethe II and Prince Henrik visited Romania. During their visit, they visited the orphanage Sfanta Macrina which is run by DanChurchAid. Danish Prime Minister Anders Fogh Rasmussen visited Romania in September 2003. During his visit he met Prime Minister of Romania Adrian Năstase. Romanian President Ion Iliescu visited Denmark in 2004. In 2006, Anders Fogh Rasmussen visited Romania, to make a speech at the annual meeting of the Romanian ambassadors.

== See also ==
- Foreign relations of Denmark
- Foreign relations of Romania
- Princess Marie of Romania
- Helen of Greece and Denmark(Wife of Carol II of Romania)
