= Italy–Romania relations =

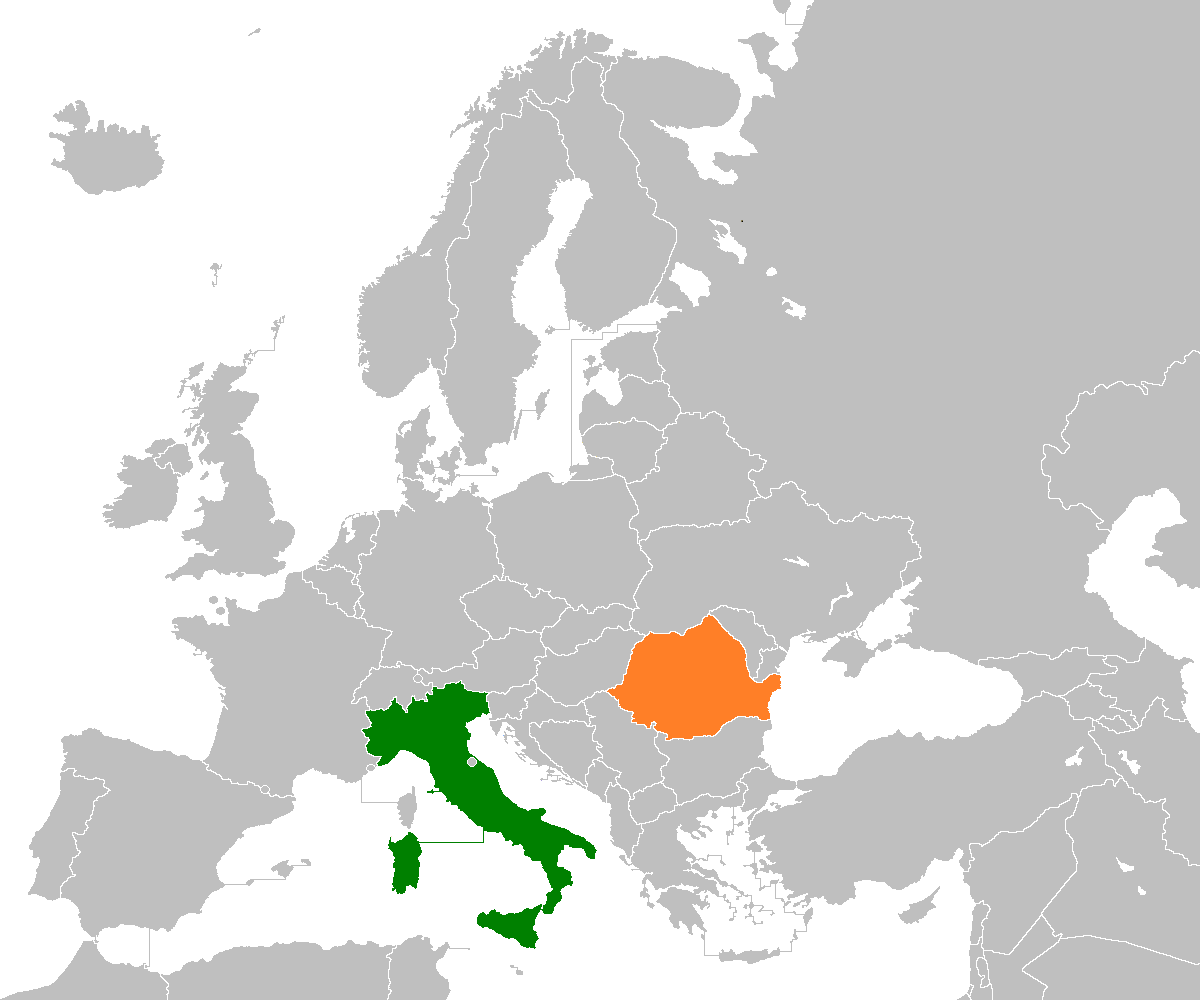
- Italy: Romania

Italy–Romania relations are foreign relations between Italy and Romania. Both countries established diplomatic relations on 21 April 1873. Italy has an embassy in Bucharest. Romania has an embassy in Rome, five general consulates (in Milan, Turin, Trieste, Bari and Bologna).

Both countries are full members of the Council of Europe, the European Union and NATO. As of December 2017, there are around 1,168,552 people of Romanian descent living in Italy, being considered the largest foreign community in the country.

== Historical and cultural relations ==
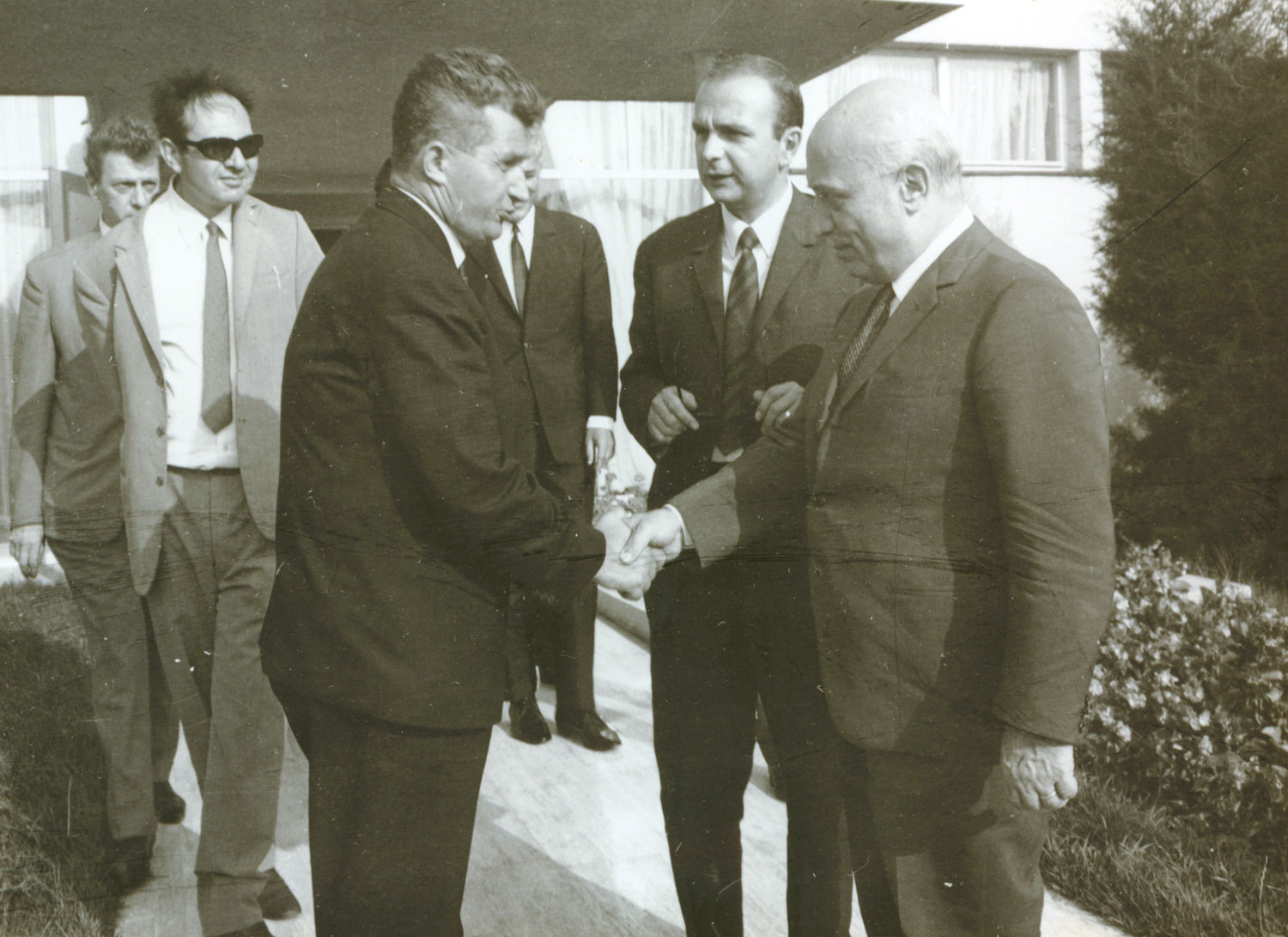
Nicolae Ceaușescu (left), General Secretary of the Romanian Communist Party, meets with Amintore Fanfani (right), Italian Minister of Foreign Affairs, in 1967

Relations between Italy and Romania have traditionally been close due to a large Latin kinship, thanks to their shared similar languages. During World War I, both countries fought the Austro-Hungarian Empire, and during World War II, contributed hundreds of thousands of troops to the Eastern Front where many died fighting the Soviets. More recently, after the collapse of the Soviet bloc, over a million Romanians moved to Italy for work and better living conditions.

== Companies ==
Several Italian banks are operating in Romania: Banca Italo Romena, Intesa Sanpaolo bank and UniCredit bank. The latter, had been in a partnership with Romanian former tennis player and business man Ion Țiriac, between 2008 and 2015.

== Resident diplomatic missions ==
- Italy has an embassy in Bucharest.
- Romania has an embassy in Rome and an consulate-generals in Bari, Bologna, Milan, Trieste and Turin and consulate in Catania.

== See also ==
- Foreign relations of Italy
- Foreign relations of Romania
- Romanians in Italy
- Italians in Romania
- Italian language in Romania
