= Netherlands–Romania relations =

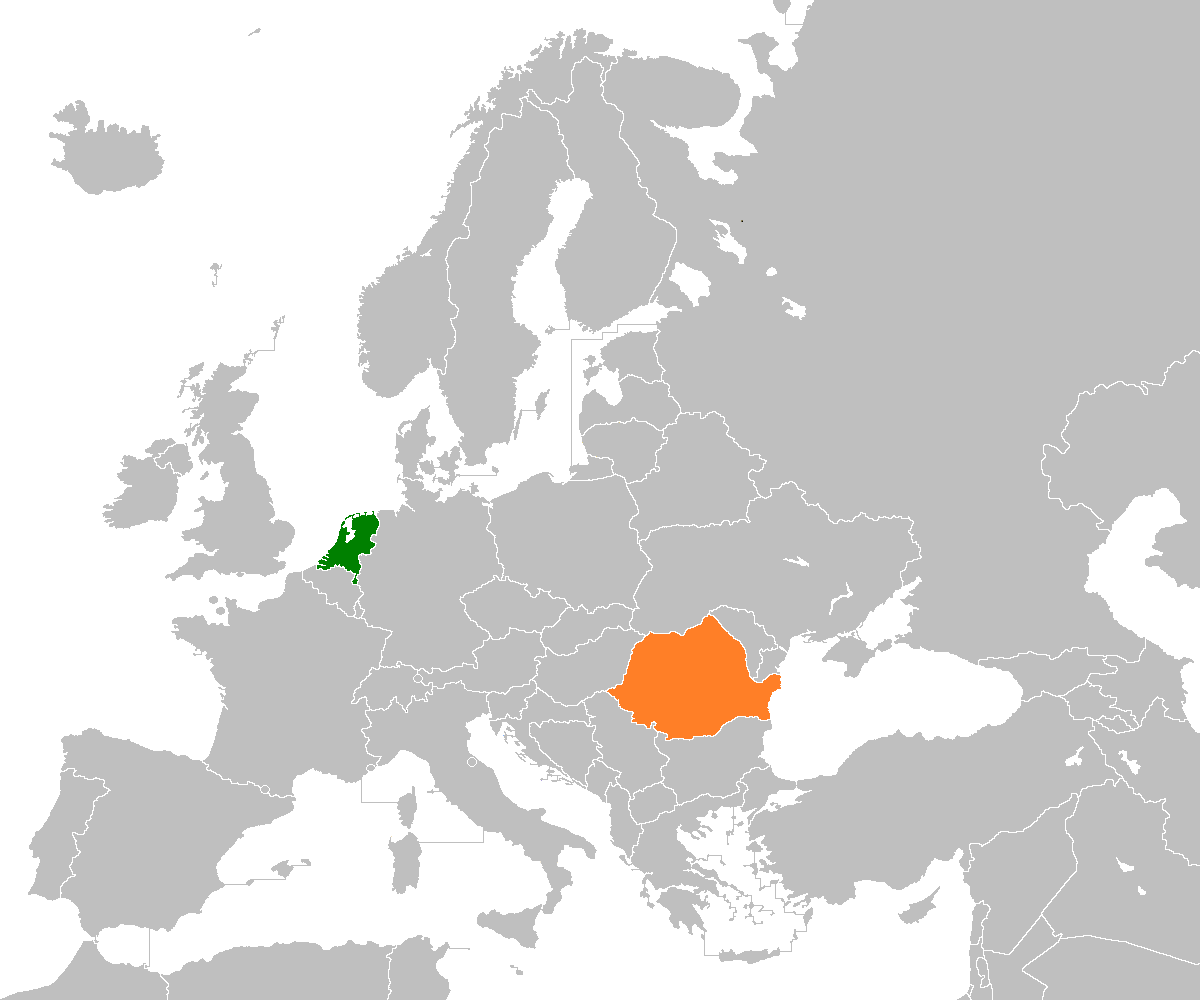
- Netherlands: Romania

Diplomatic mission
- Embassy of the Netherlands, Bucharest: Embassy of Romania, The Hague

Netherlands–Romania relations are the bilateral relations between the Netherlands and Romania. The Ambassador to Romania is concurrently accredited to Moldova. Romania has an embassy in The Hague and honorary consulates in Heeg, Rotterdam and Venlo. The Netherlands has an embassy in Bucharest, honorary consulates in Cluj-Napoca, Timișoara and Constanța, and since 2016 an office in Chișinău in Moldova.

Both countries are full members of the Council of Europe, the European Union and NATO. The Romanian Embassy in Hague is also the Permanent Representative of Romania at the Organisation for the Prohibition of Chemical Weapons as well as the Romanian Authority providing direct contact with any other international institutions and organizations based in the Netherlands.

Lucian Fătu has been appointed Ambassador of Romania to the Kingdom of the Netherlands in November 2020 and Roelof van Ees was appointed Ambassador of the Kingdom of the Netherlands to Romania in 2019. The Netherlands gave full support to Romania's applications for membership in the European Union and NATO.

== History ==
The first Dutch diplomatic representative in Romania was established on 21 December 1841 with a vice-consulate in Galați. On 25 August 1856, a mission was established in Bucharest as a consulate-general with broader powers and duties and in 1857 four honorary consulates were founded: in Botoșani, Focșani, Roman and Giurgiu. In January 1880, the Netherlands recognized the independence of Romania and the consulate in Bucharest was raised to diplomatic agency level. The consul Jean A. Keun presented his letter of credence as Chargé d'affaires. On 13 February 1880, Romania and the Netherlands officially launched the diplomatic relations at the level of legation.

Between 1880 and 1898 Romania was represented in the Netherlands through its legation in Brussels. The first head of the mission called on 17 April 1880 was minister Mihai Mitilineu. In 1898, a Romanian legation was established in The Hague led by Ion N. Papiniu. In 1900 the Romanian legation in The Hague had in subordination the general-consulate of Rotterdam and the consulates of Amsterdam, Dordrecht and Scheveningen.

On 25 August 1966 the relationships between Romania and the Netherlands were raised to embassy level.

Rotterdam and Constanța are twinned since 1968 and Sibiu is officially twinned with Deventer since 2007.

=== Romania's stance on candidacy for NATO Secretary General ===
Following the withdrawal of Romanian President Klaus Iohannis's candidacy for the position of NATO Secretary General in June 2024, Romania announced its support for the candidacy of Dutch Prime Minister Mark Rutte for the same role.

== Economic relations ==
In 2013, record values were registered in terms of the value of the trade exchanges volume, Romanian exports, and Dutch investments in Romania. The volume of trade exchanges had a total of 3573.93 million euro (export: 1538.06, import: 2035.87), up by +11.77% over 2012. The Netherlands has maintained and strengthened its position among the top ten trade partners of Romania.

The Netherlands holds the first place in the ranking by country of residence of investors in companies with foreign capital. More than six thousand companies with Dutch capital were registered. Main business fields with high potential for bilateral cooperation are energy and environment, infrastructure development, architecture, industrial subcontracting, agriculture, tourism, information technology and telecommunications. Among the main Dutch investors in Romania are Unilever, ING Group, Philips, Damen Group, Friesland Campina, Heineken, Nutricia, KPMG, Nuon, Wavin, Fokker, and DAF Trucks.

From 2014 to 2015, the number of migrant workers from Romania in the Netherlands increased from 6 thousand to 13 thousand. As of 2014, Romanian nationals can work in the Netherlands without work permit restrictions.

== Agreements ==
Legal framework:

- 19 April 1994, Bucharest: Governmental Agreement on Mutual Promotion and Protection of Investments (in force since 1 February 1995).
- 5 March 1998, The Hague: Convention for the Avoidance of Double Taxation and the Prevention of Fiscal Evasion with respect to Taxes on Income and Wealth (in force since 29 July 1999).
- 5 March 1998: Memorandum of Understanding regarding the Economic Cooperation Programme between the two Governments (in force since 11 August 1998).
- 25 April 2005, Neimënster Abbey: Treaty of Accession 2005 (effective 1 January 2007).
- 2008: Memorandum of Understanding regarding water management between Romanian Waters National Administration and Water Administrations Union of the Netherlands.

== High level visits ==
=== Netherlands to Romania ===
- Royal visits:
  - November 2001: Queen Beatrix of the Netherlands
- Visits at Prime Minister level:
  - 1994, 2001, 2003
- Visits at ministerial level:
  - 30 June 30 – 1 July 2010: visit of the Dutch Minister of Social Affairs, Piet Hein Donner.
  - 27-30 September 2010: economic mission led by the vice-minister for Foreign Trade, Roderick van Schreven.
  - 21 April 2011: visit of the Dutch minister for Infrastructure and Environment Melanie Schultz van Haegen to Galați. The signing of the Memorandum of Understanding on the cooperation between Constanța and Rotterdam harbours.
  - 10 May 2011: bilateral talks on European affairs.

=== Romania to the Netherlands ===
- High level visits:
  - 1973: Nicolae Ceaușescu
  - 1998
- Visits at Prime Minister level:
  - 1996, 1997, 2002, 2004, 2006, 2016
- Visits at ministerial level:
  - 7 December 2010: bilateral talks on consular affairs.
  - 26 April 2011: bilateral talks on European affairs.
  - 6-7 September 2011: visit of the Romanian minister of Justice, Cătălin Predoiu.
  - 15 September 2011: visit of the Romanian minister of Transport and Infrastructure, Anca Boagiu.
  - 8 November 2020: visit of Minister of Foreign Affairs (Romania), Bogdan Aurescu.

In 2001, Michael I of Romania visited the Netherlands. In 2019, his daughter Margareta of Romania visited the Netherlands to consolidate Dutch-Romanian relations.

== NATO and EU ==
While the Netherlands was one of the founding members of the EU, Romania joined the EU in 2007. While the Netherlands was one of the founding members of NATO, Romania joined NATO in 2004.

== Resident diplomatic missions ==
- the Netherlands has an embassy in Bucharest.
- Romania has an embassy in The Hague.

== See also ==
- Foreign relations of the Netherlands
- Foreign relations of Romania
- NATO-EU relations
