= Romania–Slovakia relations =

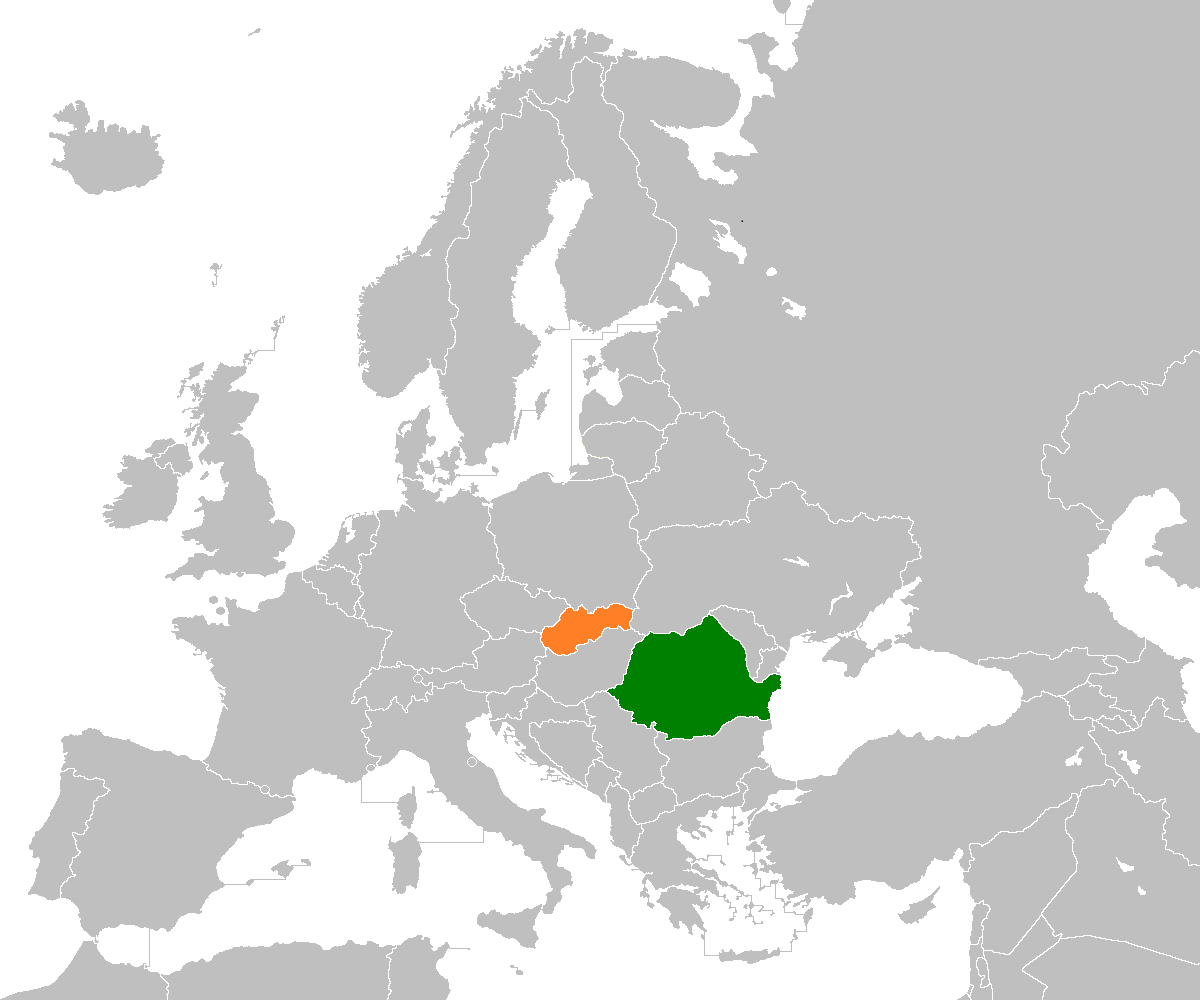
- Romania: Slovakia

Romania–Slovakia relations are the foreign relations between Romania and Slovakia. The history of relations between the two countries dates back to 30 January 1920, when Czechoslovakia and Romania officially established their diplomatic relations. During the interwar period, Romania, Czechoslovakia and Yugoslavia created an alliance, the Little Entente. Furthermore, during the Second World War, Romania and Slovakia, as well as Croatia, created a pact against Hungarian expansion. During the war, Slovak troops and Croatian air and naval forces operated amicably from Romanian soil. At the end of this war, Romanian troops fought against German soldiers to liberate Slovakia. Those Romanians who died were buried in the Military Cemetery of Zvolen. During the Warsaw Pact invasion of Czechoslovakia of 1968, Romania declared its opposition to the operation. In celebration of the 25th anniversary of the establishment of relations between Romania and Slovakia, stamps of the Military Cemetery of Zvolen with a nominal value of 8 lei (1.65€) were minted.

Currently, Romania has an embassy in Bratislava and two consulates in Banská Bystrica and Stará Ľubovňa. In the other hand, Slovakia has an embassy in Bucharest and a consulate in Salonta. Both countries are full members of the European Union and of NATO.

== Resident diplomatic missions ==
- Romania has an embassy in Bratislava.
- Slovakia has an embassy in Bucharest.

== See also ==
- Foreign relations of Romania
- Foreign relations of Slovakia
- Romanians in Slovakia
- Slovaks of Romania
