= Romania–United Kingdom relations =

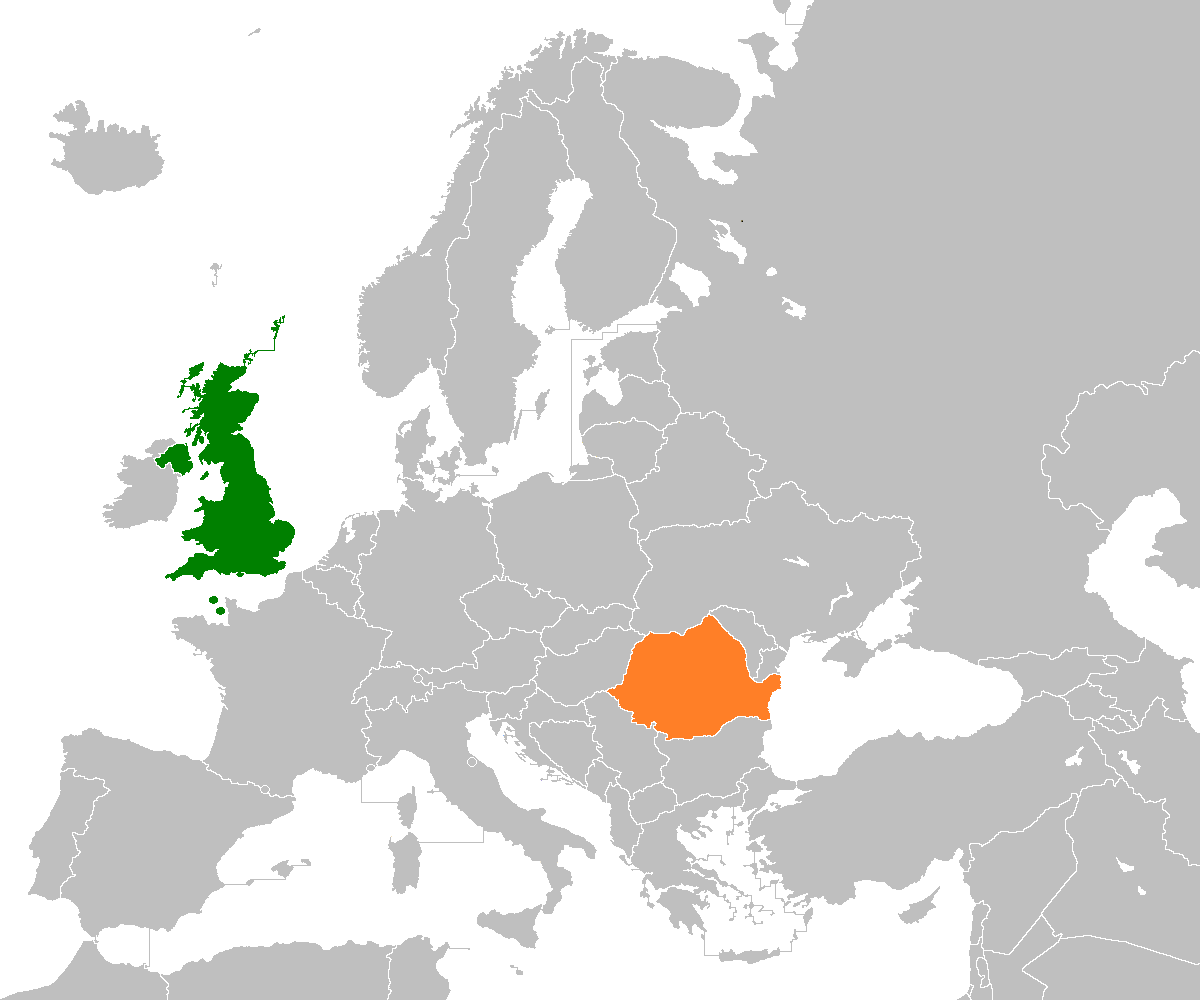

- United Kingdom: Romania

Diplomatic mission
- Embassy of the United Kingdom, Bucharest: Embassy of Romania, London

Envoy
- Giles Portman: Dan Mihalache

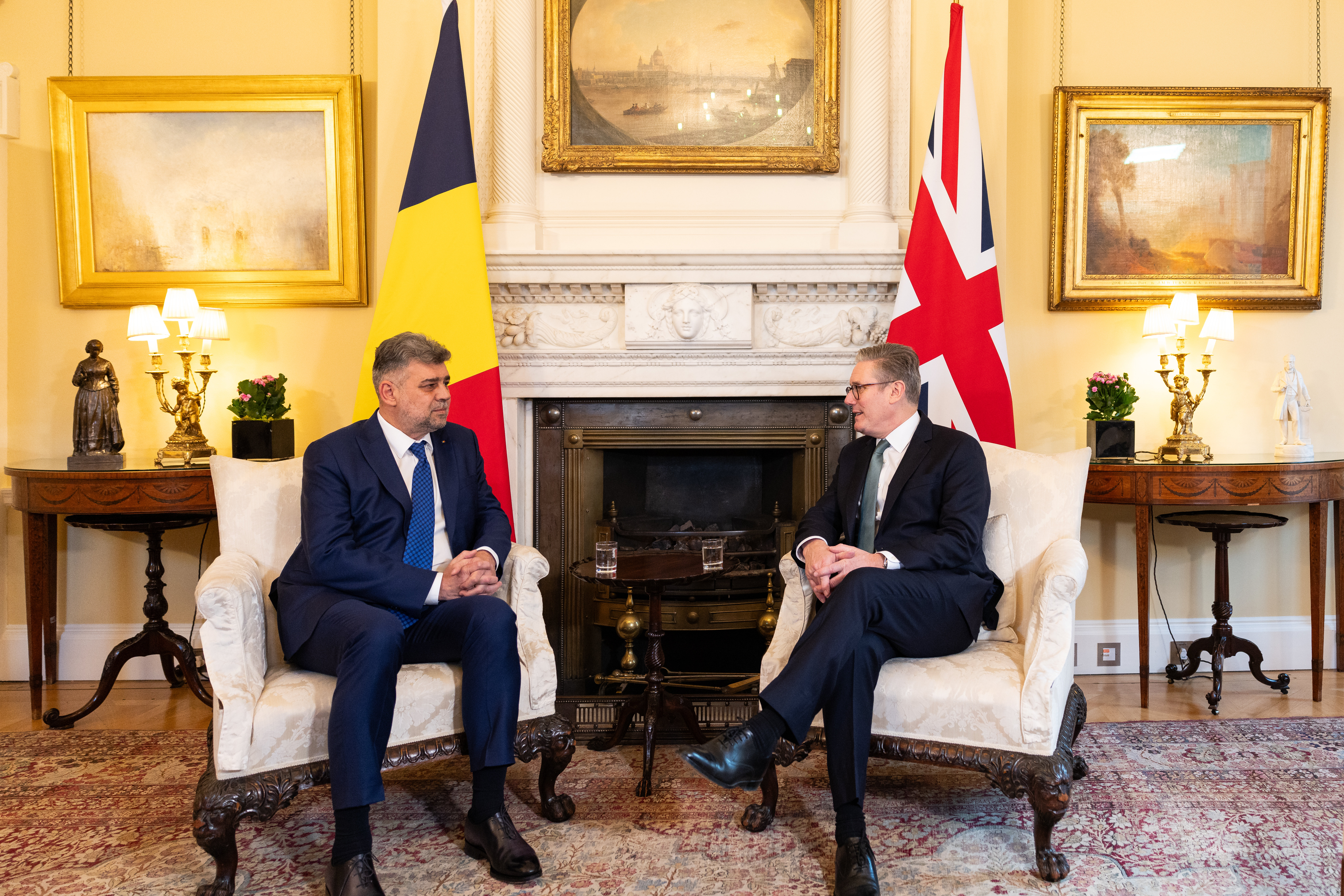
Romanian Prime Minister Marcel Ciolacu with British Prime Minister Keir Starmer in 10 Downing Street, November 2024.

Romania–United Kingdom relations encompass the diplomatic, economic, and historical interactions between Romania and the United Kingdom of Great Britain and Northern Ireland. Following the independence of Romania, both countries established diplomatic relations on 20 February 1880.

Both countries share common membership of the Council of Europe, the International Criminal Court, NATO, OSCE, and the World Trade Organization. Bilaterally the two countries have a Defence Cooperation Agreement, and a Double Taxation Convention.

== History ==
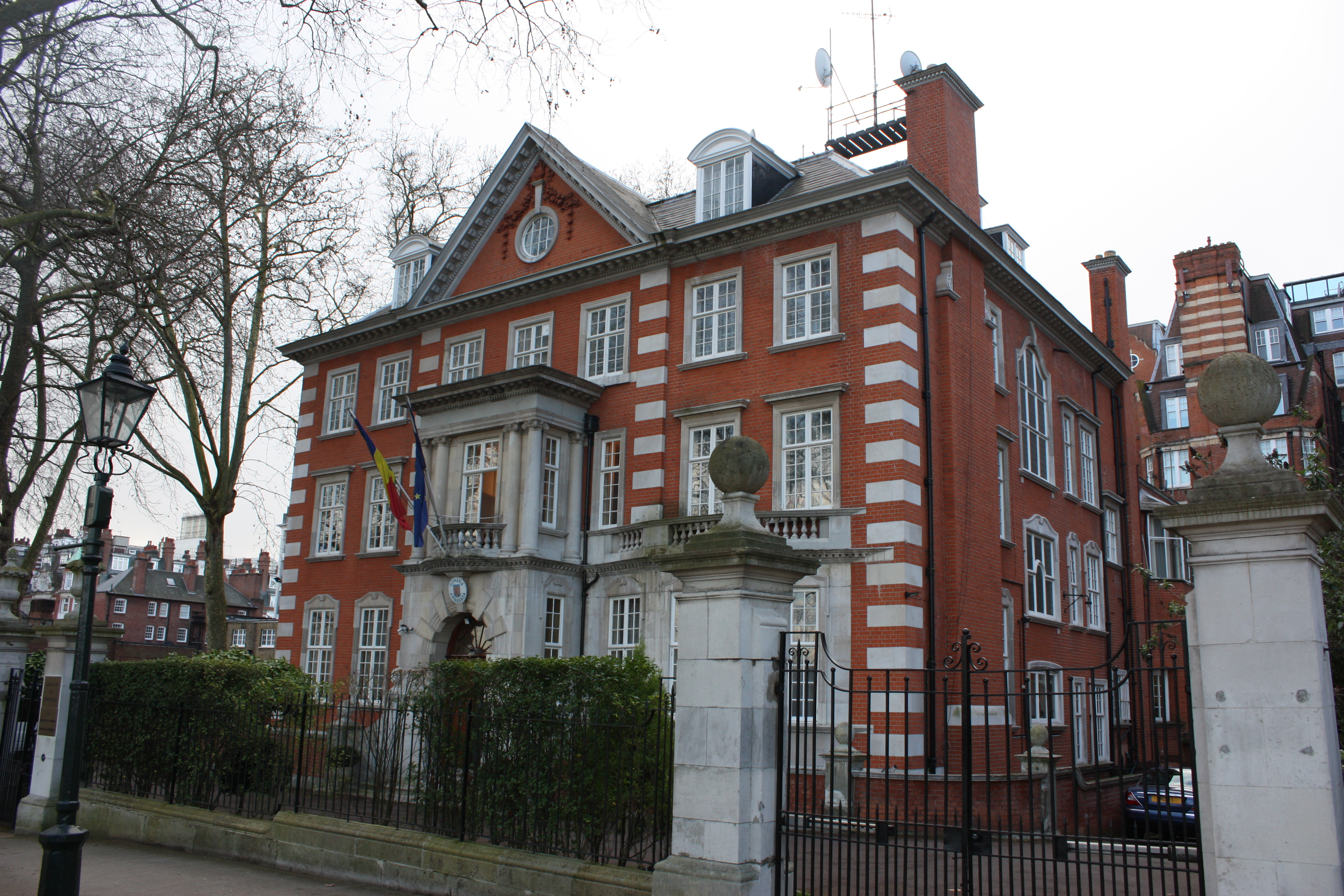
Embassy of Romania in London

In 1588, Petru Șchiopul, the Prince of Moldavia, concluded a trade treaty with Elizabeth I of England. Through the treaty, English merchants were allowed to conduct free trade in the country while paying only a 3% customs tax on the value of goods, as opposed to the 12% tax imposed on other merchants.

At the Congress of Berlin 1877 to 1878, the United Kingdom worked to assist Romania's goal of breaking away from the Ottoman Empire. The British and Russian delegations negotiated a deal whereby Romania obtained its independence, with conditions. While Britain was unable to gain all that it wanted, it did manage to prevent Russian expansion into the Mediterranean. The result was good relations between Britain and Romania, with diplomatic relations starting on 20 February 1880 after the British recognised Romania's independence.

Princess Marie of Edinburgh, a British princess as granddaughter of Queen Victoria of the United Kingdom, married Crown Prince Ferdinand of Romania; the couple later became King Ferdinand I and Queen Marie.

In recent years relations between Britain and Romania have soured due to what some hold to be xenophobic reports in the British press.

In June 2023, King Charles III visited Bucharest in a first visit by any reigning British monarch to the country.

== Economic relations ==
Trade between the United Kingdom and Romania is governed by the EU–UK Trade and Cooperation Agreement since 1 January 2021.

=== Companies ===
The Royal Bank of Scotland operated in Romania between 15 October 2008 and 31 December 2015.

The Romanian subsidiary of the British company Vodafone is the second largest mobile network operator in the country.

One of the best known Romanian brands in the United Kingdom is Dacia. It has a wide spread network of dealers throughout the country.

== Resident diplomatic missions ==
- Romania maintains an embassy in London, and consulate generals in Edinburgh and Manchester. Romania also maintains honorary consulates in Hirwaun, Leeds, Morpeth-Newcastle and Southampton.
- The United Kingdom is accredited to Romania through its embassy in Bucharest.

== See also ==
- Foreign relations of Romania
- Foreign relations of United Kingdom
- Romanians in the United Kingdom
- Britishs in Romania
- British Romanian Educational Exchange
- United Kingdom–European Union relations
