= Portugal–Romania relations =

Diplomatic relations between the Portuguese Republic and Romania

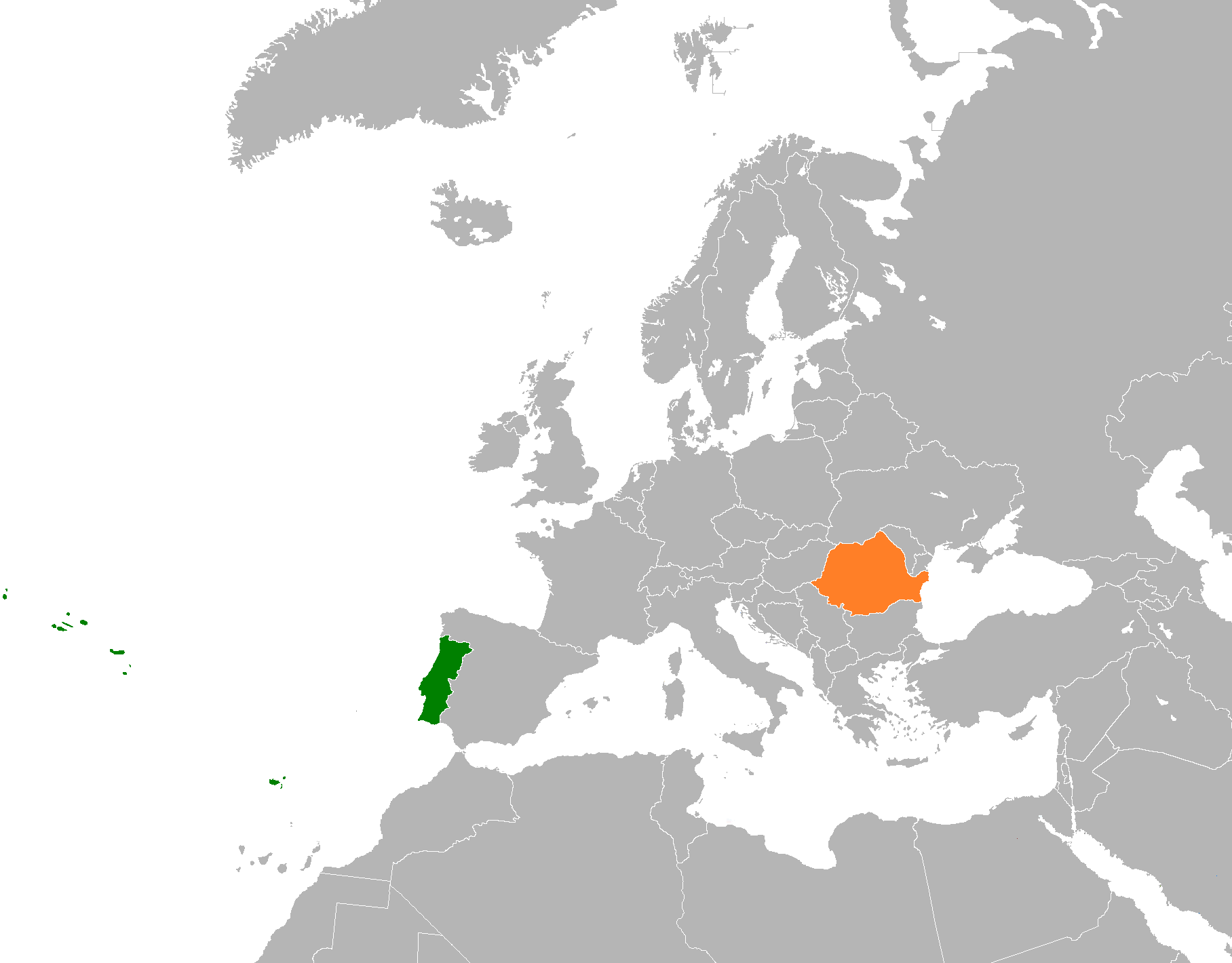
- Portugal: Romania

The diplomatic relations between the Portuguese Republic and Romania date back to 1917, having been interrupted following World War II, before being re-established in June 1974, following the Carnation Revolution in Portugal. Since then, the relations between the two countries have been stable and friendly. Portugal has an embassy in Bucharest (also is accredited in Moldova), while Romania has an embassy in Lisbon. Both nations are members of the Council of Europe, EU, NATO and the United Nations.

== History ==
Portugal and Romania, although countries located at the two extremes of Europe, had at one point been part of the Roman Empire and have had numerous approaches and connections throughout history. The two counties find a common heritage in the Roman Empire, and the language of the two countries is the most visible element of their shared heritage, as both the Portuguese and Romanian Languages are Romance Languages, having evolved from Latin throughout the centuries.

In 1880, Portugal recognized the independence of Romania after the Romanian War of Independence from the Ottoman Empire. Diplomatic relations between the two countries were established on August 31, 1917. That same year, Romania established a resident embassy in Lisbon. In December 1919, Portugal opened the Portuguese Legation to the Balkans, based in Bucharest, and with jurisdiction over Serbia and Greece, as well as Romania.

The deposed king of Romania, Carol II, would live in Estoril, in Portugal during his exile, where he would eventually pass away.

During World War II, diplomatic relations were not interrupted between both nations, however, soon after the war, Portugal broke diplomatic relations with Romania after that nation became a communist country. On May 31, 1974, diplomatic relations were resumed, and they have remained stable ever since. Romania was the first Eastern European country to restore relations with Portugal after the Carnation Revolution.

Throughout the first decades of the 21st century, a storing increase of Romanian immigration in Portugal was registered, with the Romanian community in Portugal amounting to 40 000 people in 2011, a significant increase since 2000, when only 370 Romanian citizens lived in Portugal. Since 2011 the number of Romanians in Portugal has had a slight decrease, and in 2021, approximately 30 000 Romanian citizens were registered as residing in Portugal, with the Romanian community being the 4th largest community of foreign residents in the country.

Since the end of the Romanian Revolution in 1989, bilateral relations between both nations have increased. Portugal supported Romania's entry into the European Union, for which Romania was admitted to in 2007. In 2017, both nations celebrated 100 years since the establishment of diplomatic relations.

== Bilateral agreements ==
Since the re-establishment of diplomatic relations between the two countries, several bilateral agreements were signed, including:

- Cultural Agreement, on January 6, 1975
- Agreement for Cooperation in the field of Tourism, on March 15, 1975
- Treaty of Friendship and Cooperation and Agreement for Economic, Technical and Scientific long term cooperation, both on June 14, 1975
- Agreement regarding the international transportation of goods and people, on July 22, 1979
- Agreement on the Mutual Protection and Promotion of Investments, and Agreement for Economic, Industrial and Technical-Scientific Cooperation, both on November 17, 1993
- Agreement for military cooperation, on July 10, 1995;
- Agreement for Education, Science, Culture, Sports, Youth, Tourism and Media Cooperation, on September 16, 1997
- Convention on the Avoidance of Double Taxation and Prevention of Tax Evasion on matters of Taxes on Income and Capital Gains, on September 17, 1997
- Convention on Social Security, on August 1, 2006

== High-level visits ==
Following the re-establishment of diplomatic relations between the two countries in 1974, several-high level visits took place, starting in 1975, with official visits being carried out in that year by the respective heads of state.

=== Visits from Portuguese statesmen to Romania ===
- June 13–15, 1975, Francisco Costa Gomes, President of the Portuguese Republic
- March 21–23, 1979, António Ramalho Eanes, President of Portugal
- March 3–6, 2000, Jorge Sampaio, President of Portugal
- May 15, 2014, Bruno Maçães, secretary of state for European affairs
- September 29, 2014, Paulo Portas, vice prime-minister
- June 18 and 19, Aníbal Cavaco Silva, President of Portugal
- May 25 and 26, 2017, Margarida Marques, secretary of state for European affairs
- November 6 and 7, João Gomes Cravinho, minister for national defence

=== Visits from Romanian statesmen to Portugal ===
- October 28–31, Nicolae Ceausescu, President of Romania
- July 5, 1991, Ion Iliescu, President of Romania
- December 2 and 3, 1996, Emil Constantinescu, President of Romania
- June 29, 2001, Adrian Năstase, prime-minister
- October 29 to November 1, 2003, Ion Iliescu, President of Romania
- July 13, 2007, Calin Popescu-Tariceanu, prime-minister
- June 2, 2014, Titus Corlatean, minister of foreign affairs
- September 26, 2017, George Ciamba, secretary of state for European affairs
- October 23, 2017, Klaus Iohannis, President of Romania
- June 7, 2018, Vasilica Viorica Dăncilă, prime-minister

== Economic relations ==
Portugal and Romania have a sturdy economic relation, as both countries are member states of the European Union, and consequently of the European single market.

In 2020 the total value of the Portuguese exports to Romania was of 475.5 million euro, while the imports amounted to 238.2 million euro, which represents a surplus for the Portuguese side of 273.3 million euro. The volume of commercial exchanges between the two countries has been increasing, with an annual average growth during the 2016-2020 period of 5.1% in the exports and of 19.6% in the exports, from the Portuguese perspective. The main products exported from Portugal to Romania in 2020 were Vehicles and other transportation material, and Machinery, while the main product groups exported from Romania to Portugal were Vegetable Products and Vehicles and other transportation material.

In 2019, Romania was the 19th largest importer and 33rd largest exporter from and to Portugal, while Portugal was, in the same year, the 39th largest importer and 27th largest exporter from and to Romania.

== Cultural relations ==
The Portuguese cultural institute, the Camões Institute is represented in Romania, and has Portuguese Language Centres in the cities of Bucharest, Cluj-Napoca, Constanța and Timisoara, as well as an Academic Chair in Bucharest, and Lectureships in the Universities of Bucharest, Babes-Bolyai, Ovidius de Constanța and Timisoara

The Romanian cultural institute, the Institutul Cultural Român is also present in Portugal, in the city of Lisbon.

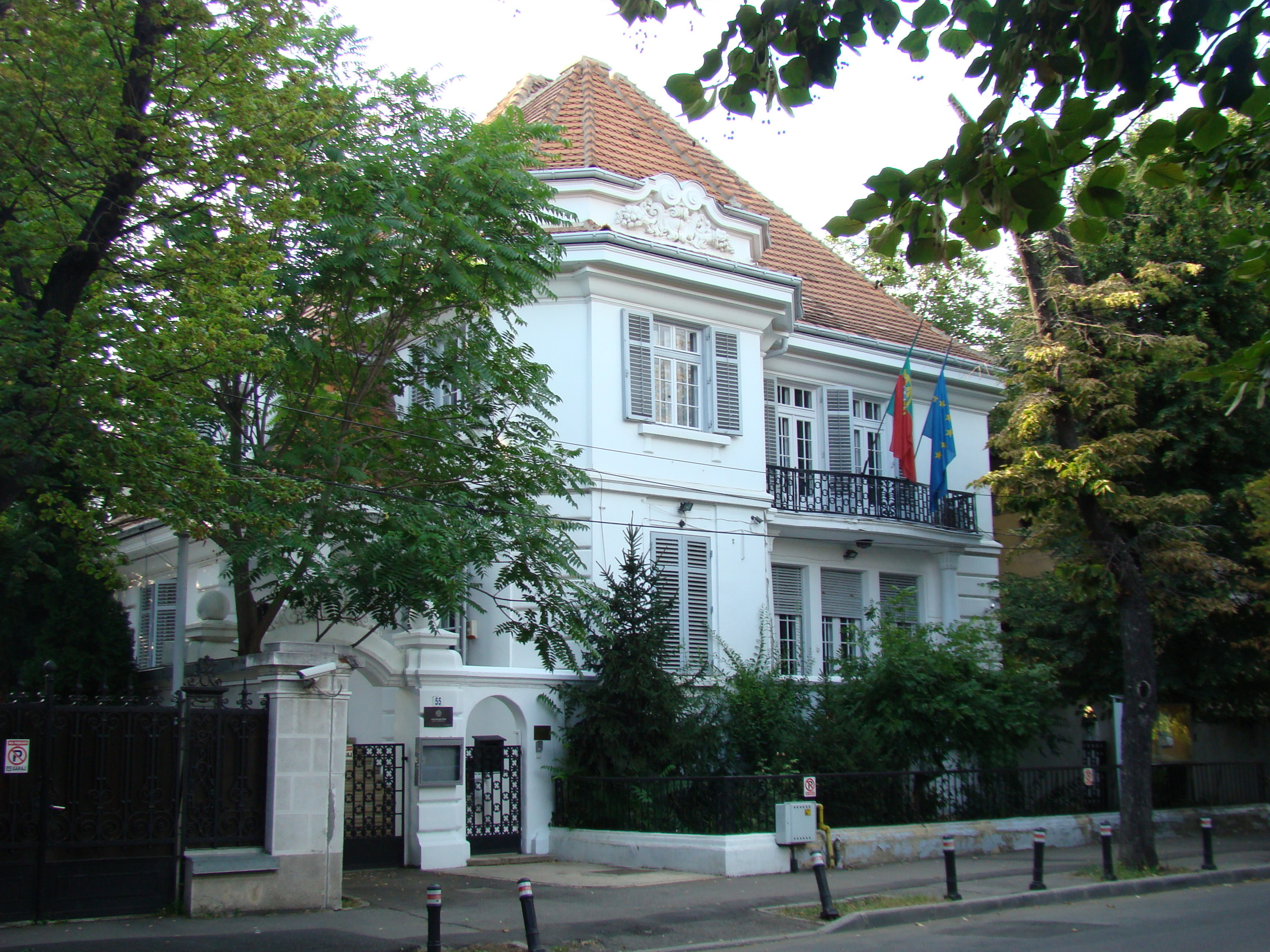
Embassy of Portugal in Bucharest

== Resident diplomatic missions ==
- Portugal has an embassy in Bucharest.
- Romania has an embassy in Lisbon. Romania also has 2 Honorary Consulates in Portugal, in Porto and Estoril.

== Notes ==
- The Embassy of Portugal in Bucharest is accredited to Moldova.

== See also ==
- Foreign relations of Portugal
- Foreign relations of Romania
- NATO-EU relations
