= Foreign policy of Romania before World War I =

The foreign policy of Romania in the years preceding the outbreak of World War I was characterized by the nation's need to contend with the rise and shifting rivalries of the Great Powers of the pre-war era. Its primary objectives were to maintain its territorial integrity and maintain friendly relations with neighboring nations. This culminated in Romania secretly joining the Triple Alliance in 1883. However, the nation would later reverse course, declaring neutrality for the first two years of the war before entering on the side of the Triple Entente in 1916.

== Context ==
At the beginning of the 20th century, the state of international affairs in Europe was characterized as being a "fight of all against all".

== Relations with the Balkan states ==
The development of relations with the Balkan states was one of the foreign policy priorities of Romania in the period following its independence in 1878. The nature of these relations varied, being influenced by the evolution of the political, economic and security interests of Romania; the attitudes of the governments of Greece, Serbia, Turkey, and Bulgaria toward the country; and the relations of these countries with the two major alliances on the continent.

Romania's main strategic priorities during this period included the defense of its border between the Danube and the Black Sea, maintained access to the Bosporus and Dardanelles straits, through which 90% of external trade passed, and preventing the nation's isolation by maintaining an open Salonic – Niš – Danube line of communication. The accomplishment of the latter would prevent the river from either being blocked as a result of local conflict, or being taken over by one of the Great Powers in the area.

Based on these priorities, the external politics adopted by Romania in the first years of the 20th century was one of "compensations", with its main goal being the maintenance of the "balance of forces" in order to prevent the rise of a regional hegemonic state, which would preserve the status quo in the region.

After the passing of the crisis in Romanian–Turkish relations of 1905 and the severing of diplomatic relations with Greece during the same years, the Romanian government, led by Dimitrie Sturdza, made known its intention refuses to engage in any alliance within the Balkans and to maintain the option to intervene in any situation that could change the balance of power in the region against Romania's interests.

=== Relations with Bulgaria ===
In June 1900, Professor Ștefan Mihăileanu, one of the leaders of the national Aromanian movement, was assassinated on the streets of Bucharest by a Bulgarian komitadji. Romanian public opinion turned sharply against Bulgaria and war was only narrowly avoided.

The subsequent Second Balkan War left Romania and Bulgaria as rivals.

== Alliances ==
On 18 October 1883, Romania secretly joined the Triple Alliance by signing a secret bilateral treaty with Austria-Hungary. The treaty stipulated that the allies would support each other in the case of an attack by another power (implicitly, Russia, Serbia, or Bulgaria), and would not join an alliance against the other. Germany joined the agreement on the same day, through a separate treaty.

The alliance with the Central Powers was the headstone of Romania's external politics for 30 years due to the king's and political leaders' perception that the Central Powers were the most powerful military and economic force in Europe.

Through this alliance, Romania avoided the diplomatic isolation that would have resulted from an alliance between the Russian and Austro-Hungarian Empires. At the same time, Romania received specific guarantees of security, saw the consolidation of its political position in southeastern Europe, and obtained a convenient solution to the "Danube Question".

Over time, however, the alliance between Romania and the Central Powers began to weaken, especially regarding the Romanian problem in Hungary. Romanian public opinion became more and more hostile toward Austria-Hungary.

The Balkan Wars constituted the most severe test of the alliance between Romania and Austria-Hungary. In the Second Balkan War, Romania received no support from the Habsburg Empire, which had as its primary objective the assimilation of Bulgaria into the Triple Alliance. At the same time, a warming of relations between Romania and France came about after the latter supported Romania during the negotiation of the Treaty of Bucharest. "The Balkan crisis of 1912–1913 completed the alienation of Romania in relation to Austria-Hungary and the Triple Alliance. [...] In the spring of 1914, the approach between Romania and Triple Entente was a real fact".
