= Romania–South Korea relations =

- Romania: South Korea

Romania and South Korea officially established relations on 30 March 1990, and both countries have embassies. Additionally, Romania has honorary consulates in Busan, Incheon and Asan, while South Korea also has ones in Rădăuți, Timișoara and Constanța.

== History ==
One of the earliest recorded interactions between Romanians and Koreans took place around the Paris Peace Conference. Representatives associated with the Korean Provisional Government sought support from the victorious Allied powers for Korean independence from Japanese rule. Although their appeals were largely unsuccessful, a Romanian diplomat, whose identity is not recorded, allegedly reassured the Korean representatives that Romania would support their aspirations for independence, drawing a parallel with Romania's own path to independence.

Additionally, parallels were drawn between the national aspirations of minorities within Austria-Hungary, particularly the Slavs and Romanians, and those of Korean independence activists in the United States seeking international support for Korean independence from Japanese colonial rule. The national movements of groups such as the Czechs, Slovaks, Serbs, Croats and Romanians in Austria-Hungary involved diplomatic efforts to gain international recognition, which have been compared with the activities of Korean independence leaders abroad.

The friendly relations were subsequently disrupted in the aftermath of World War II, as the Kingdom of Romania was abolished and the communist regime was established with Soviet support. Romania subsequently adopted a foreign policy aligned with the Eastern Bloc, establishing diplomatic relations with other communist states, including North Korea on 26 October 1948.

Romanian stamp commemorating the 1994 Universal Postal Union (UPU) congress held in South Korea.

South Korean attempts to establish ties with Romania date back to the 1970s, although these efforts were hindered by Romania's socialist government. Diplomatic relations were eventually established in March 1990, following the collapse of communism and the Romanian Revolution. From then on, bilateral relations developed steadily, culminating in the signing of the Joint Declaration on the Establishment of the Bilateral Strategic Partnership between Romania and the Republic of Korea in September 2008. This was complemented in 2010 by the Joint Plan of Action for the Implementation of the Partnership. These agreements made Romania the first European Union member state to establish a strategic partnership with South Korea, preceding the upgrading of EU–South Korea relations to the same level. South Korea also became Romania's first strategic partner in Asia.

== Economic ==
Since the establishment of diplomatic relations in 1990, the Korea Trade-Investment Promotion Agency (KOTRA) has supported trade and investment between South Korea and Romania.

Meeting between Woo Won-shik and Nicușor Dan at the anniversary of 35 years of relations.

In 2025, South Korean exports to Romania were valued at around €52.4 million, with major export categories including chemical products, metals, electronic and electrical equipment, and semiconductors. South Korea recorded a trade surplus with Romania, while trade with Romania also provides South Korean companies with access to the EU single market. South Korea is consequently among Romania's major Asian trading partners.

== Cultural ==
The Korean Wave has gained visibility in Romania through the growing popularity of K-pop and Korean television series. A 2021 study examining perceptions of Korean culture in Romania noted the presence of approximately 1,000 Koreans living in or temporarily staying in the country. The study also found generally positive perceptions of Korean culture among Romanians surveyed, with respondents showing curiosity about Korean culture and reporting few instances of hostility towards Koreans. At the same time, the study identified both positive and negative aspects of living in Romania as perceived by Korean respondents.

As part of celebrations marking the 35th anniversary of diplomatic relations between Romania and South Korea, a cultural exchange event was held on 6 March 2025 at the CN Gallery in Seoul. The event featured Romanian cultural traditions and was attended by 18 ambassadors and diplomats from Europe, Asia, and South America. Students from the Hankuk University of Foreign Studies also participated, wearing traditional Romanian clothing.
