= Visa requirements for Albanian citizens =

Administrative entry restrictions

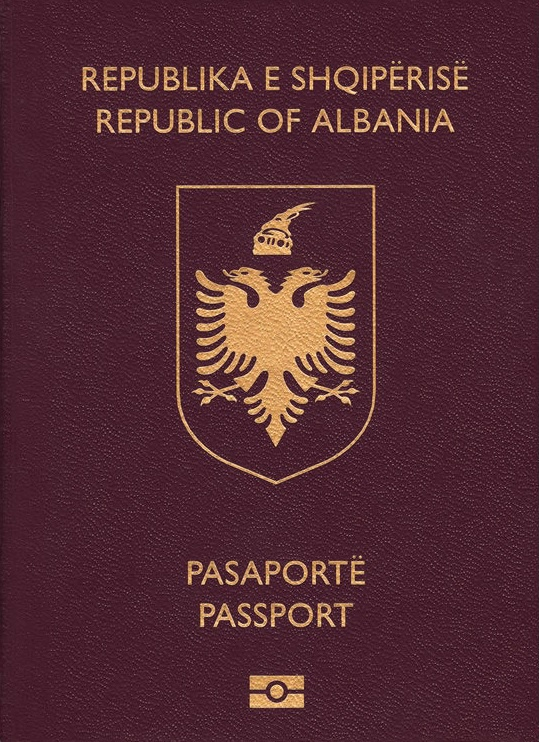
An Albanian passport with biometric chip

Visa requirements for Albanian citizens are administrative entry restrictions by the authorities of other nations placed on citizens of Albania.

As of 2026, holders of Albanian biometric passports had visa-free or visa-on-arrival access to 123 countries and territories worldwide, placing the Albanian passport 43rd in the world for travel freedom according to the Henley & Partners Passport Index, an authoritative global ranking based on International Air Transport Association (IATA) and diplomatic data.

This 2025 ranking reflects continued expansion of bilateral travel agreements and visa-liberalisation arrangements. Within Europe, Albanian citizens have enjoyed visa-free access to the Schengen Area since 15 December 2010, allowing stays of up to 90 days within any 180-day period under the EU-Albania visa liberalisation agreement. Visa-free or visa-on-arrival access also extends to many destinations in the Americas, Asia, Africa, and Oceania, though advanced visas remain necessary for certain major destinations such as the United States, Russia, Mexico, Japan and Argentina.

== Visa requirements map ==
Visa requirements for Albanian citizens holding ordinary passports Albania ID card travel Visa not required / ETA (Note: ETA required for Kenya, Israel, Saint Kitts and Nevis, Seychelles, Sri Lanka and South Africa) Visa not required (conditional) Visa on arrival eVisa Online Visa (not easy process) Visa available both on arrival or online (Note: Including Indonesian e-VOA) Visa required prior to arrival

== Visa requirements ==
Visa requirements are subject to change at short notice. Travelers are advised to confirm entry conditions with the destination country’s official immigration authority or the Albanian Ministry of Foreign Affairs prior to travel.

Country	Visa requirement	Allowed stay	Notes (excluding departure fees)
Afghanistan	eVisa	30 days	e-Visa : Visitors must arrive at Kabul International (KBL).
Algeria	Visa required		Visitors can apply for a visa on arrival to travel to designated areas through travel agencies licensed by the Algerian government.
Andorra	Visa not required	90 days	
Angola	eVisa	30 days	30 days within 90 days a year.
Antigua and Barbuda	Visa not required	180 days	
Argentina	Visa required		An Electronic Authorization (AVE or ETA) option is available for valid visa holders of the United States.; As of 1 October 2017, visas are issued with a 10-year validity period.
Armenia	Visa not required	180 days	180 days within 1-year period.
Australia	Online Visa required		May apply online (Online Visitor e600 visa).
Austria	Visa not required	90 days	90 days within any 180 day period in the Schengen Area. (Note: Holders of biometric passports only.)
Azerbaijan	Visa not required	90 days	90 days within any 180 day period.
Bahamas	eVisa	3 months	
Bahrain	eVisa / Visa on arrival	14 days	
Bangladesh	Visa on arrival	30 days	
Barbados	Visa not required	28 days	
Belarus	Visa not required	30 days	For a maximum total stay of 90 days within any 1 calendar year.
Belgium	Visa not required	90 days	90 days within any 180 day period in the Schengen Area.
Belize	Visa required		
Benin	eVisa	30 days	Must have an international vaccination certificate.; Three types of electronic visa are offered: the e-Visa valid for 30 days for a single entry (50 EUR), the e-Visa valid for 30 days for several (multiple) entries (75 EUR), and the e-Visa valid for 90 days to make several (multiple) entries (100 EUR).
Bhutan	eVisa	90 days	The Sustainable Development Fee (SDF) of 200 USD per person, per night for almost all visitors to Bhutan. Additionally, if payment is made in US dollars from September 1, 2023 to August 31, 2027, the SDF is 100 USD.
Bolivia	Online Visa		Visitors must complete an online application form, but still need to visit an embassy to receive a sticker visa.
Bosnia and Herzegovina	Visa not required	90 days	90 days within any 6-month period.; ID card valid.
Botswana	eVisa		
Brazil	Visa not required	90 days	90 days within any 180 day period.
Brunei	Visa required		
Bulgaria	Visa not required	90 days	90 days within any 180 day period in the Schengen Area.
Burkina Faso	eVisa		
Burundi	Online Visa / Visa on arrival	1 month	
Cambodia	eVisa / Visa on arrival	30 days	
Cameroon	eVisa		
Canada	Online Visa required		Visa not required for permanent residents of the United States.
Cape Verde	Visa on arrival	30 days	Travelers must obtain a pre-registration (EASE) before departure and have an application number to avoild higer fees upon arrival.
Central African Republic	Visa required		
Chad	eVisa		
Chile	Visa not required	90 days	
China	Visa not required	90 days	90 days within any 180 day period.
Colombia	Visa not required	90 days	
Comoros	Visa on arrival	45 days	
Republic of the Congo	Visa required		
Democratic Republic of the Congo	eVisa	7 days	
Costa Rica	Visa required		
Côte d'Ivoire	eVisa	3 months	
Croatia	Visa not required	90 days	90 days within any 180 day period in the Schengen Area.
Cuba	eVisa	90 days	Can be extended up to 90 days with a fee.
Cyprus	Visa not required	90 days	90 days within any 180 day period.
Czech Republic	Visa not required	90 days	90 days within any 180 day period in the Schengen Area.
Denmark	Visa not required	90 days	90 days within any 180 day period in the Schengen Area.
Djibouti	eVisa	90 days	
Dominica	Visa not required	21 days	
Dominican Republic	Visa not required	90 days	
Ecuador	Visa required		
Egypt	eVisa / Visa on arrival	30 days	Visa on arrival availability may vary by port of entry and airline; obtaining an e-Visa prior to travel is recommended.
El Salvador	Visa not required	3 months	
Equatorial Guinea	eVisa		
Eritrea	Visa required		
Estonia	Visa not required	90 days	90 days within any 180 day period in the Schengen Area.
Eswatini	eVisa		
Ethiopia	eVisa	90 days	e-Visa holders must arrive via Addis Ababa Bole International Airport.
Fiji	eVisa		
Finland	Visa not required	90 days	90 days within any 180 day period in the Schengen Area.
France	Visa not required	90 days	90 days within any 180 day period in the Schengen Area.
Gabon	eVisa	90 days	e-Visa holders must arrive via Libreville International Airport.
Gambia	Visa not required		
Georgia	Visa not required	1 year	
Germany	Visa not required	90 days	90 days within any 180 day period in the Schengen Area.
Ghana	eVisa	90 days	
Greece	Visa not required	90 days	90 days within any 180 day period in the Schengen Area.
Grenada	Visa required		
Guatemala	Visa required		
Guinea	eVisa	90 days	
Guinea-Bissau	Visa on arrival	90 days	
Guyana	Visa not required	90 days	
Haiti	Visa not required	3 months	
Honduras	Visa required		
Hungary	Visa not required	90 days	90 days within any 180 day period in the Schengen Area.
Iceland	Visa not required	90 days	90 days within any 180 day period in the Schengen Area.
India	eVisa	30 days	e-Visa holders must arrive via 32 designated airports (Note: Ahmedabad; Amritsar; Bagdogra; Bengaluru; Bhubaneswar; Chandigarh; Chennai; Coimbatore; Delhi; Gaya; Goa-Dabolim; Goa-Manohar; Guwahati; Hyderabad; Indore; Jaipur; Kannur; Kochi; Kolkata; Kozhikode; Lucknow; Madurai; Mangaluru; Mumbai; Nagpur; Port Blair; Pune; Surat; Thiruvananthapuram; Tiruchirappalli; Varanasi; Visakhapatnam) or 5 designated seaports. (Note: Chennai; Cochin; Mormugao (Goa); Mumbai; Mangalore); An Indian e-Tourist Visa may only be obtained twice within 1 calendar year.; Foreigners of Pakistani origin or who hold a Pakistani Passport are not eligible for an e-Visa. Foreigners who are not Pakistani nationals, but whose parents or grandparents (either paternal or maternal) were born in, or were permanent residents in Pakistan, are also not eligible for an e-Visa.
Indonesia	e-VOA / Visa on arrival	30 days	
Iran	eVisa	30 days	
Iraq	eVisa	30 days	Visitors can also apply for an e-Visa (30 days) to visit the Iraqi Kurdistan Region.
Ireland	eVisa		Visa is issued free of charge.; Visa waiver for UK 'C' visa holders. Entry permitted only if first point of entry to the Common Travel Area is in the UK.; Guards not present at the Ireland-Northern Ireland.
Israel	Electronic Travel Authorization	90 days	Foreign nationals entering Israel through Ben Gurion Airport are issued an entry permit upon arrival, which serves as proof of legal stay and must be retained until departure. Admission is determined solely by Israeli border and immigration authorities at the airport.; Travelers who are denied entry and issued a return order must contact an Israeli diplomatic mission for information about future travel eligibility.; Since 1 August 2024, visa-exempt travelers are required to complete the ETA-IL electronic travel authorization prior to travel and may enter Israel only after receiving approval or holding a valid visa.
Italy	Visa not required	90 days	90 days within any 180 day period in the Schengen Area.
Jamaica	Visa on arrival	90 days	
Japan	Visa required		
Jordan	eVisa / Visa on arrival		Visa can be obtained upon arrival, it will cost a total of 40 JOD, obtainable at most international ports of entry and land border crossings. (except King Hussein/Allenby Bridge)
Kazakhstan	Visa not required	90 days	90 days within any 365 day period.
Kenya	Electronic Travel Authorisation	90 days	Applications can be submitted up to 90 days prior to travel and must be submitted at least 3 days in advance.; eTA fee is 32.50 USD.; Proof of reservation at the hotel where visitors plan to stay is required (if staying with friends, an invitation letter is also acceptable).; Yellow fever vaccination certificate is required if coming from endemic countries.
Kiribati	Visa required		
North Korea	Visa required		
South Korea	Electronic Travel Authorization	30 days	The validity period of a K-ETA is 3 years from the date of approval.
Kuwait	Visa required		
Kyrgyzstan	Visa not required	30 days	30 days within any 60-day period.
Laos	eVisa / Visa on arrival	30 days	18 (Note: Savannakhet Airport; Lanetoui - Mengkang (China); Meuangmom - Wan Pong (Myanmar); Banvang - Ban Khok Phai (Thailand); Namngeun - Huay Kon (Thailand); Paksan - Bueng Kan (Thailand); Paktaphan - Pak Saeng (Thailand); Pangmon - Ban Huak (Thailand); Phoudou (Thailand); Dak ta ock - Nam Giang (Vietnam); La Lai (Vietnam); Namkan (Vietnam); Namphao - Cau Treo (Vietnam); Namsoy - Na Meo (Vietnam); Naphao - Cha Lo (Vietnam); Pahang - Long Sap (Vietnam); Panghok - Tây Trang (Vietnam); Phoukeua - Bo Y (Vietnam)) of the 33 border crossings are only open to regular visa holders.; e-Visa may be used to enter Laos through the Luang Prabang, Pakse and Vientiane international airports, 3 Thai-Lao Friendship Bridges (Note: Vientiane (Friendship Bridge 1); Savannakhet (Friendship Bridge 2); Bokeo (Friendship Bridge 4)), in Boten (road and railroad), and in Vientiane (at Khamsavath railway station).; Visa on arrival is available at the Luang Prabang, Pakse and Vientiane international airports, 4 Thai-Lao Friendship Bridges (Note: Vientiane (Friendship Bridge 1); Savannakhet (Friendship Bridge 2); Khammouane (Friendship Bridge 3); Bokeo (Friendship Bridge 4)) and 7 border crossings. (Note: Nongnokkheane - Trapeang Kriel (Cambodia); Boten - Bo han (China); Golden Triangle/Samliemkham (Thailand); Khamsavath railway station (Thailand); Namheuang - Ban Na Kraseng (Thailand); Vang tao - Chongmek (Thailand); Dansavan - Lao Bảo (Vietnam))
Latvia	Visa not required	90 days	90 days within any 180 day period in the Schengen Area.
Lebanon	Visa required		
Lesotho	Visa required		
Liberia	e-VOA	3 months	
Libya	eVisa		
Liechtenstein	Visa not required	90 days	90 days within any 180 day period in the Schengen Area.
Lithuania	Visa not required	90 days	90 days within any 180 day period in the Schengen Area.
Luxembourg	Visa not required	90 days	90 days within any 180 day period in the Schengen Area.
Madagascar	eVisa/Visa on arrival	90 days	For stays of 61 to 90 days, the visa fee is 59 USD.
Malawi	eVisa / Visa on arrival	30 days	
Malaysia	Visa not required	3 months	The electronic Malaysia Digital Arrival Card must be submitted within three days before the date of arrival in Malaysia.
Maldives	Free visa on arrival	30 days	
Mali	Visa required		
Malta	Visa not required	90 days	90 days within any 180 day period in the Schengen Area.
Marshall Islands	Visa required		
Mauritania	eVisa	30 days	Available at Nouakchott–Oumtounsy International Airport.
Mauritius	Visa on arrival	60 days	
Mexico	Visa required		Exemption applies only to holders of valid multiple-entry visas or residence permits; admission remains discretionary.
Micronesia	Visa not required	30 days	
Moldova	Visa not required	90 days	90 days within any 180 day period.
Monaco	Visa not required	90 days	
Mongolia	eVisa	30 days	
Montenegro	Visa not required	90 days	ID card valid for 30 days.
Morocco	Visa not required	90 days	
Mozambique	eVisa / Visa on arrival	30 days	
Myanmar	eVisa	28 days	e-Visa holders must arrive via Yangon, Nay Pyi Taw or Mandalay airports or via land border crossings with Thailand — Tachileik, Myawaddy and Kawthaung or India — Rih Khaw Dar and Tamu.; e-Visa is available for tourism only.
Namibia	eVisa	3 months	Available at Hosea Kutako International Airport and other points of entry.
Nauru	Visa required		
Nepal	eVisa / Visa on arrival	90 days	
Netherlands	Visa not required	90 days	90 days within any 180 day period in the Schengen Area.
New Zealand	Online Visa required		Holders of an Australian Permanent Resident Visa or Resident Return Visa may be granted a New Zealand Resident Visa on arrival permitting indefinite stay (pursuant to the Trans-Tasman Travel Arrangement), subject to meeting character requirements and obtaining an Electronic Travel Authority prior to departure.
Nicaragua	Visa not required	90 days	Nationals of Albania with a visa issued by Canada, the USA or a Schengen Member State can obtain a visa upon arrival for a maximum of 30 days.
Niger	Visa required		
Nigeria	eVisa	30 days	
North Macedonia	Visa not required	90 days	ID card valid.; 90 days within any 180 day period.
Norway	Visa not required	90 days	90 days within any 180 day period in the Schengen Area.
Oman	Visa not required	14 days	As of January 2026, Albanians belong to the first group of visa exemptions in Oman.
Pakistan	eVisa	3 months	Issued in 7–10 business days.
Palau	Free visa on arrival	30 days	
Panama	Visa required		Passengers holding a multiple entry visa issued by Australia, Canada, Japan, South Korea, Singapore, the US, the UK or an EU member state are exempt from the visa.
Papua New Guinea	eVisa	60 days	Visitors may apply for a visa online under the "Tourist - Own Itinerary" category.
Paraguay	Visa required		Visitors must complete an online application form, but still need to visit an embassy to receive a sticker visa.
Peru	Visa required		
Philippines	Visa required		Tourist visas must be obtained in advance through a Philippine diplomatic mission; limited online pre-application systems do not constitute visa-free or eVisa entry.; Residents of the United Arab Emirates may obtain an e-Visa through the official Philippine eVisa website. A valid Emirati residence visa must be shown upon an eVisa application.
Poland	Visa not required	90 days	90 days within any 180 day period in the Schengen Area.
Portugal	Visa not required	90 days	90 days within any 180 day period in the Schengen Area.
Qatar	eVisa		Travelers can apply for a visa on the Hayya website.
Romania	Visa not required	90 days	90 days within any 180 day period in the Schengen Area.
Russia	Visa required		
Rwanda	Visa not required	30 days	
Saint Kitts and Nevis	Electronic Travel Authorisation	90 days	
Saint Lucia	Visa required		
Saint Vincent and the Grenadines	Visa not required	3 months	
Samoa	Visa not required	60 days	
San Marino	Visa not required	90 days	
São Tomé and Príncipe	eVisa		
Saudi Arabia	eVisa / Visa on arrival	90 days	
Senegal	Visa required		
Serbia	Visa not required	90 days	ID card valid.; 90 days within any 6-month period.
Seychelles	Electronic Border System	3 months	Application can be submitted up to 30 days before travel.; Visitors must upload a reservation confirmation(s) for each visitor's location of stay in Seychelles.; Yellow fever vaccination certificate is required if coming from endemic countries.; Payment of the fee (EUR 10) by credit or debit card.; Valid for one journey only and it expires once exit the country.
Sierra Leone	eVisa	3 months	
Singapore	Visa not required	30 days	
Slovakia	Visa not required	90 days	90 days within any 180 day period in the Schengen Area.
Slovenia	Visa not required	90 days	90 days within any 180 day period in the Schengen Area.
Solomon Islands	Visa required		
Somalia	eVisa	30 days	
South Africa	Electronic Travel Authorization / eVisa		
South Sudan	eVisa		Obtainable online.; Printed visa authorization must be presented at the time of travel.
Spain	Visa not required	90 days	90 days within any 180 day period in the Schengen Area.
Sri Lanka	Electronic Travel Authorisation	30 days	Sri Lanka introduced an ETA valid for 30 days.
Sudan	Visa required		
Suriname	Visa not required	90 days	An entrance fee of USD 50 or EUR 50 must be paid online prior to arrival.; Multiple entry e-Visa is also available.
Sweden	Visa not required	90 days	90 days within any 180 day period in the Schengen Area.
Switzerland	Visa not required	90 days	90 days within any 180 day period in the Schengen Area.
Syria	eVisa		Entry is subject to additional security clearance; airline acceptance and port-of-entry conditions may vary.
Tajikistan	Visa not required (conditional) / eVisa	14 days / 60 days	Citizens aged 55 and above can travel for 14 days without a visa.
Tanzania	eVisa / Visa on arrival	90 days	
Thailand	Visa not required	60 days	
Timor-Leste	Visa on arrival	30 days	
Togo	eVisa	15 days	
Tonga	Visa required		
Trinidad and Tobago	Visa not required	90 days	
Tunisia	Visa required		
Turkey	Visa not required	90 days	
Turkmenistan	Visa required		When transiting between two non-bordering countries, visitors can obtain a Turkmenistan transit visa for a five-day stay. This must be applied for in advance at the Turkmenistan Embassy. Visitors must also submit copies of the visas for the country of entry into Turkmenistan and the country of departure from Turkmenistan. Visa fee is 20 USD.
Tuvalu	Visa on arrival	1 month	
Uganda	eVisa	3 months	
Ukraine	Visa not required	90 days	90 days within any 180 day period.
United Arab Emirates	Visa not required	180 days	
United Kingdom	Online Visa required		Albanian citizens who hold a valid entry visa for Australia, Canada, New Zealand or the United States, and a valid airline ticket for travel via the United Kingdom, as part of a journey to or from one of those countries and/or are permanent residents of the European Union, Australia, Canada and New Zealand do not require a Direct Airside Transit visa.
United States	Visa required		May not apply for an immigrant visa.
Uruguay	Visa required		
Uzbekistan	eVisa	30 days	5-day visa-free transit at the international airports if holding a confirmed onward ticket for a flight to a third country.
Vanuatu	eVisa	120 days	
Vatican City	Visa not required		
Venezuela	eVisa		Introduction of Electronic Visa System for Tourist and Business Travelers.
Vietnam	eVisa		e-Visa is valid for 90 days and multiple entry.; Phú Quốc visa exemption for up to 30 days.
Yemen	Visa required		Yemen introduced an e-Visa system for visitors who meet certain eligibility requirements (group travel of 10 or more people, business trips, and transit etc.).
Zambia	Visa not required	30 days	
Zimbabwe	eVisa / Visa on arrival	1 month	

=== Territories and disputed areas ===
Visa requirements for Albanian citizens for visits to various territories, disputed areas, partially recognized countries and restricted zones:

Visitor to	Visa requirement	Notes (excluding departure fees)
Europe
Abkhazia	Visa required	Tourists from all countries (except Georgia) can visit Abkhazia for a period not exceeding 24 hours as part of an organized tourist group.
Mount Athos	Special permit required	Special permit required (4 days: €25 for Eastern Orthodox Church visitors, €35 for non-Orthodox visitors, €18 for students). There is a visitors' quota: maximum 100 Eastern Orthodox Church and 10 non-Orthodox per day and women are not allowed.
(Belarus) Brest and Grodno	Visa not required	Visa-free for 10 days
(Autonomous Republic of Crimea) Crimea	Visa not required	Visa policy of Russia is applied.
Turkish Republic of Northern Cyprus	Visa not required	3 months
(United Nations) UN Buffer Zone in Cyprus	Access Permit required	Access Permit is required for travelling inside the zone, except Civil Use Areas.
Faroe Islands	Visa not required	90 days
Gibraltar	Visa not required	
Guernsey	Visa required	
Isle of Man	Visa required	
(Norway) Jan Mayen	Permit required	Permit issued by the local police required for staying for less than 24 hours and permit issued by the Norwegian police for staying for more than 24 hours.
Jersey	Visa required	
Kosovo	90 days; ID card valid.	
Russia	Special authorization required	Several closed cities and regions in Russia require special authorization.
South Ossetia	Visa required	To enter South Ossetia, visitors must have a multiple-entry visa for Russia and register their stay with the Migration Service of the Ministry of Internal Affairs within 3 days.
(Norway) Svalbard	Visa not required	Unlimited stay.; Everybody may live and work in Svalbard indefinitely regardless of country of citizenship.
Transnistria	Visa not required	Registration required after 24h.
Africa
British Indian Ocean Territory	Special permit required	Special permit required.
Eritrea outside Asmara	Travel permit required	To travel in the rest of the country, a Travel Permit for Foreigners is required (20 Eritrean nakfa).
Mayotte	Visa not required	90 days
Réunion	Visa not required	90 days
Ascension Island	eVisa	3 months within any year period.
Saint Helena	eVisa	
Tristan da Cunha	Permission required	Permission to land required for 15/30 pounds sterling (yacht/ship passenger) for Tristan da Cunha Island or 20 pounds sterling for Gough Island, Inaccessible Island or Nightingale Islands.
Sahrawi Arab Democratic Republic		Undefined visa regime in the Western Sahara controlled territory.
Somaliland	Visa required	
Sudan	Travel permit required	All foreigners travelling more than 25 kilometres outside of Khartoum must obtain a travel permit.
(Sudan) Darfur	Travel permit required	Separate travel permit is required.
Asia
Hong Kong	Visa not required	14 days
India PAP/RAP	PAP/RAP required	Protected Area Permit (PAP) required for whole states of Nagaland and Sikkim and parts of states Manipur, Arunachal Pradesh, Uttaranchal, Jammu and Kashmir, Rajasthan, Himachal Pradesh. Restricted Area Permit (RAP) required for all of Andaman and Nicobar Islands and parts of Sikkim. Some of these requirements are occasionally lifted for a year.
Kazakhstan	Special permission required	Special permission required for the town of Baikonur and surrounding areas in Kyzylorda Oblast, and the town of Gvardeyskiy near Almaty.
(Iran) Kish Island	Visa not required	Visitors to Kish Island do not require a visa.
Macao	Visa not required	90 days
Maldives	Permission required	With the exception of the capital Malé, tourists are generally prohibited from visiting non-resort islands without the express permission of the Government of Maldives.
North Korea outside Pyongyang	Special permit required	People are not allowed to leave the capital city, tourists can only leave the capital with a governmental tourist guide (no independent moving)
Palestine	Visa not required	Arrival by sea to Gaza Strip not allowed.
Taiwan	Visa not required	90 days
(Tajikistan) Gorno-Badakhshan Autonomous Province	OIVR permit required	OIVR permit required (15+5 Tajikistani Somoni) and another special permit (free of charge) is required for Lake Sarez.
(China) Tibet Autonomous Region	TTP required	Tibet Travel Permit required (10 US Dollars).
Turkmenistan	Special permit required	A special permit, issued prior to arrival by Ministry of Foreign Affairs, is required if visiting the following places: Atamurat, Cheleken, Dashoguz, Serakhs and Serhetabat.
(United Nations) Korean Demilitarized Zone	Restricted zone.	
(United Nations) UNDOF Zone and Ghajar	Restricted zone.	
Yemen	Special permission required	Special permission needed for travel outside Sanaa or Aden.
Caribbean and North Atlantic
Anguilla	eVisa	
Aruba	Visa not required	30 days
Bermuda	Visa required	
(Netherlands) Bonaire, St. Eustatius and Saba	Visa not required	90 days
British Virgin Islands	Visa required	
Cayman Islands	Visa required	
Curacao	Visa not required	90 days
(France) French Guiana	Visa not required	90 days
(France) French West Indies	Visa not required	90 days; French West Indies refers to Martinique, Guadeloupe, Saint Martin and Saint Barthélemy.
Greenland	Visa not required	90 days
Montserrat	eVisa	
Puerto Rico	Visa required	
Saint Pierre and Miquelon	Visa not required	90 days
Sint Maarten	Visa not required	90 days
Turks and Caicos Islands	Visa required	
U.S. Virgin Islands	Visa required	
Oceania
American Samoa	Entry permit required	
(Australia) Ashmore and Cartier Islands	Special authorisation required	Special authorisation required.
(France) Clipperton Island	Special permit required	Special permit required.
Cook Islands	Visa not required	31 days
(Fiji) Lau Province	Special permission required	Special permission required.
French Polynesia	Visa not required	90 days
Guam	Visa required	
New Caledonia	Visa required	
Niue	Visa not required	30 days
Northern Mariana Islands	Visa required	
Pitcairn Islands	Visa not required	14 days visa free and landing fee US$35 or tax of US$5 if not going ashore.
Tokelau	Entry permit required	
United States Minor Outlying Islands	Special permits required	Special permits required for Baker Island, Howland Island, Jarvis Island, Johnston Atoll, Kingman Reef, Midway Atoll, Palmyra Atoll and Wake Island.
Wallis and Futuna	Visa not required	90 days
South Atlantic and Antarctica
Falkland Islands	Visa required	
South Georgia and the South Sandwich Islands	Permit required	Pre-arrival permit from the Commissioner required (72 hours/1 month for 110/160 pounds sterling).
Antarctica		Special permits required for British Antarctic Territory, French Southern and Antarctic Lands, Argentine Antarctica, (Australia) Australian Antarctic Territory, (Antártica Chilena Province) Chilean Antarctic Territory, (Australia) Heard Island and McDonald Islands, (Norway) Peter I Island, (Norway) Queen Maud Land, (New Zealand) Ross Dependency.

- Visas for Cambodia, Myanmar, Rwanda, São Tomé and Príncipe and Sri Lanka are obtainable online.

== Diplomatic and official passports only ==
Countries	allowed stay
Algeria	90 days
Argentina	90 days
Cuba	90 days
Ecuador	90 days
Japan	90 days
Kuwait	90 days
Marshall Islands	90 days (Note: For diplomatic passport only.)
Mongolia	90 days
Peru	90 days
Philippines	90 days
Qatar	90 days
Russia	90 days
South Africa	90 days
Tunisia	90 days
Uruguay	90 days
Uzbekistan	90 days
Vietnam	90 days

== Albanian ID as optional passport replacement ==
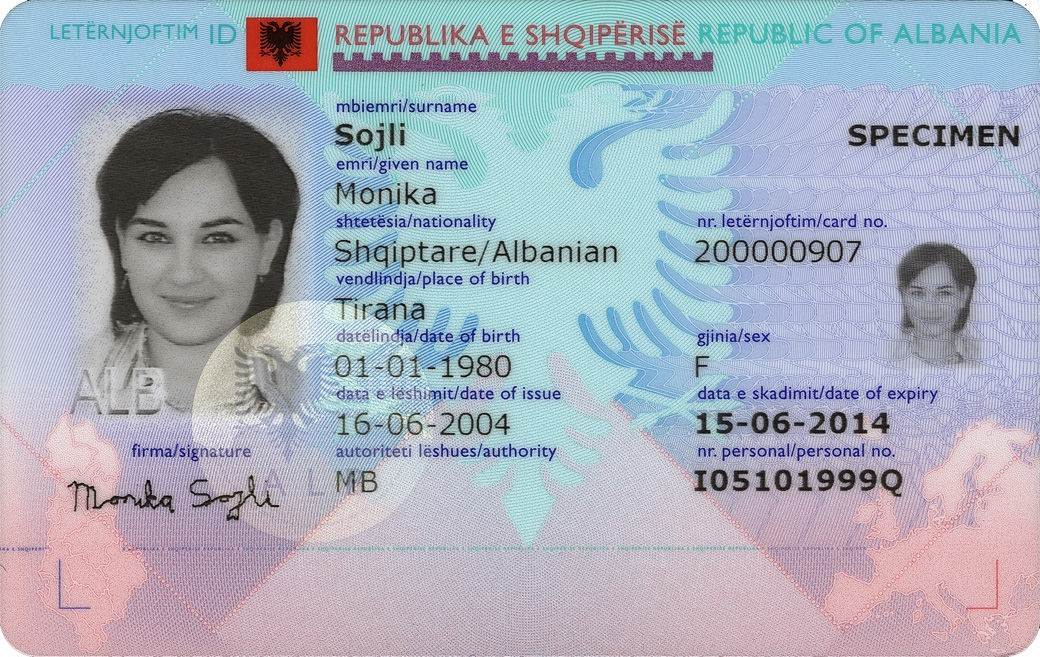
Albanian identity card

Albanian identity cards can be used instead of a passport for travel to the Western Balkan countries and territories that have signed bilateral agreements with Albania.

Countries and territories
Bosnia and Herzegovina
Kosovo
Montenegro
North Macedonia
Serbia

== Non-visa travel restrictions ==
=== Blank passport pages ===
Many countries require a minimum number of blank pages to be available in the passport being presented, typically one or two pages. Endorsement pages, which often appear after the visa pages, are not counted as being valid or available.

=== Vaccination ===
Cover of the new International Certificate of Vaccination issued by the Bureau of Quarantine in the Philippines since 2021

The African countries of Angola, Benin, Burkina Faso, Burundi, Cameroon, Central African Republic, Democratic Republic of the Congo, Republic of the Congo, Côte d'Ivoire, Gabon, Ghana, Guinea-Bissau, Mali, Niger, Sierra Leone and Togo, South Sudan and Uganda, along with French Guiana in South America, require all incoming passengers older than nine months to one year, to have a current International Certificate of Vaccination or Prophylaxis.

Some other countries require vaccination only if the passenger is coming from an infected area or has visited one recently or has transited for 12 hours in those countries: Algeria, Botswana, Cabo Verde, Chad, Djibouti, Egypt, Eswatini, Ethiopia, Gambia, Ghana, Guinea, Lesotho, Libya, Equatorial Guinea, Eritrea, Madagascar, Malawi, Mauritania, Mauritius, Mozambique, Namibia, Nigeria, Papua New Guinea, Seychelles, Somalia, South Africa, Sudan, Tunisia, Uganda, Tanzania, Zambia and Zimbabwe.

=== Passport validity length ===
Very few countries, such as Paraguay, just require a valid passport on arrival.

However many countries and groupings now require only an identity card – especially from their neighbours. Other countries may have special bilateral arrangements that depart from the generality of their passport validity length policies to shorten the period of passport validity required for each other's citizens or even accept passports that have already expired (but not been cancelled).

Some countries, such as Japan, Ireland and the United Kingdom, require a passport valid throughout the period of the intended stay.

In the absence of specific bilateral agreements, countries requiring passports to be valid for at least 6 more months on arrival include Afghanistan, Algeria, Anguilla, Bahrain, Bhutan, Botswana, British Virgin Islands, Brunei, Cambodia, Cameroon, Cape Verde, Cayman Islands, Central African Republic, Chad, Comoros, Costa Rica, Côte d'Ivoire, Curaçao, Ecuador, Egypt, El Salvador, Equatorial Guinea, Fiji, Gabon, Guinea Bissau, Guyana, Haiti, India, Indonesia, Iran, Iraq, Israel, Jordan, Kenya, Kiribati, Kuwait, Laos, Madagascar, Malaysia, Marshall Islands, Mongolia, Myanmar, Namibia, Nepal, Nicaragua, Nigeria, Oman, Palau, Papua New Guinea, Peru, Philippines, Qatar, Rwanda, Samoa, Saudi Arabia, Singapore, Solomon Islands, Somalia, Sri Lanka, Sudan, Suriname, Tanzania, Thailand, Timor-Leste, Tokelau, Tonga, Turkey, Tuvalu, Uganda, United Arab Emirates, Vanuatu, Venezuela, and Vietnam.

Countries requiring passports valid for at least 4 months on arrival include Micronesia and Zambia.

Countries requiring passports with a validity of at least 3 months beyond the date of intended departure include Azerbaijan, Bosnia and Herzegovina, Honduras, Montenegro, Nauru, Moldova and New Zealand. Similarly, the EEA countries of Iceland, Liechtenstein, Norway, all European Union countries (except Ireland) together with Switzerland also require 3 months validity beyond the date of the bearer's intended departure unless the bearer is an EEA or Swiss national.

Countries requiring passports valid for at least 3 months on arrival include Albania, North Macedonia, Panama, and Senegal.

Bermuda requires passports to be valid for at least 45 days upon entry.

Countries that require a passport validity of at least one month beyond the date of intended departure include Eritrea, Hong Kong, Lebanon, Macau, the Maldives and South Africa.

==== Maximum passport age ====
Countries of the Schengen area require non-EU passports to be less than 10 years old upon entry.

=== Criminal record ===
Some countries, including Australia, Canada, Fiji, New Zealand and the United States, routinely deny entry to non-citizens who have a criminal record, while others impose restrictions depending on the type of conviction and the length of the sentence.

=== Persona non grata ===
The government of a country can declare a diplomat persona non grata, banning them from entering the country or expelling them if they have already entered. In non-diplomatic use, the authorities of a country may also declare a foreigner persona non grata permanently or temporarily, usually because of unlawful activity.

=== Israeli stamps ===
Kuwait, Lebanon, Libya, and Yemen do not allow entry to people with passport stamps from Israel or whose passports have either a used or an unused Israeli visa, or where there is evidence of previous travel to Israel such as entry or exit stamps from neighbouring border posts in transit countries such as Jordan and Egypt.

To circumvent this Arab League boycott of Israel, the Israeli immigration services have now mostly ceased to stamp foreign nationals' passports on either entry to or exit from Israel (unless the entry is for some work-related purposes). Since 15 January 2013, Israel no longer stamps foreign passports at Ben Gurion Airport. Passports are still (as of 22 June 2017) stamped at Erez when passing into and out of Gaza.

Iran refuses admission to holders of passports containing an Israeli visa or stamp that is less than 12 months old.

=== Biometrics ===
Several countries mandate that all travellers, or all foreign travellers, be fingerprinted on arrival and will refuse admission to or even arrest travellers who refuse to comply. In some countries, such as the United States, this may apply even to transit passengers who merely wish to change planes rather than go landside.

Fingerprinting countries/regions include Afghanistan, Argentina, Brunei, Cambodia, China, Ethiopia, Ghana, Guinea, India, Japan, Kenya (both fingerprints and a photo are taken), Malaysia upon entry and departure, Mongolia, Saudi Arabia, the Schengen Area, Singapore, South Korea, Taiwan, Thailand, Uganda, the United Arab Emirates and the United States.

Many countries also require a photo be taken of people entering the country. The United States, which does not fully implement exit control formalities at its land frontiers (although long mandated by its own legislation), intends to implement facial recognition for passengers departing from international airports to identify people who overstay their visa.

Together with fingerprint and face recognition, iris scanning is one of three biometric identification technologies internationally standardised since 2006 by the International Civil Aviation Organization (ICAO) for use in e-passports and the United Arab Emirates conducts iris scanning on visitors who need to apply for a visa. The United States Department of Homeland Security has announced plans to greatly increase the biometric data it collects at US borders. In 2018, Singapore began trials of iris scanning at three land and maritime immigration checkpoints.

== See also ==
- Visa policy of Albania
- Albanian passport
