= Albanian passport =

Travel document

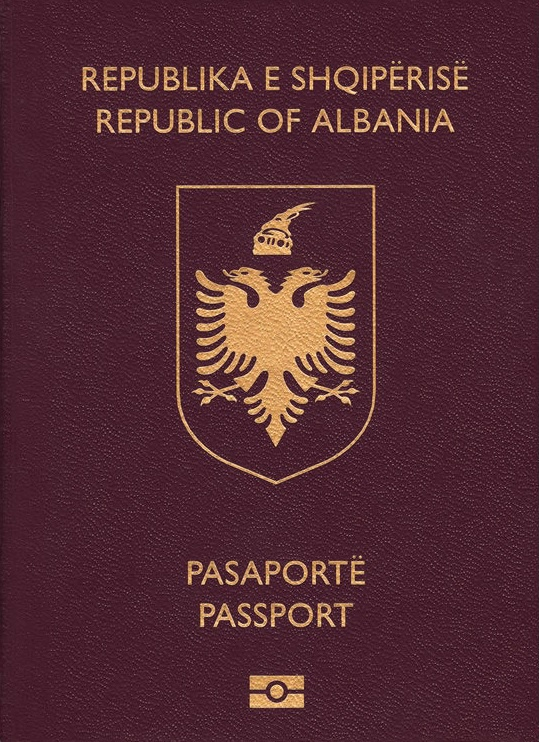
- The front cover of a contemporary Albanian biometric passport
- Type: Passport
- Issued by: Albania
- First issued: 24 March 2009 (biometric passport)
- Purpose: Identification and travel abroad
- Eligibility: Albanian citizenship
- Expiration: 5 years for under 16 year olds 10 years otherwise
- Cost: L7,500 for standard applications L18,000 for priority applications

The Albanian passport (Albanian: Pasaporta shqiptare) is a travel document issued by the Ministry of the Interior to Albanian citizens to enable them to travel abroad. They are also used as proof of identity within the country, alongside national identity cards (letërnjoftim).

The passport costs 7,500 lekë and is valid for 10 years, provided the applicant is at least 16 years old. For citizens under the age of 16, passports are issued with a 5-year validity.

The Albanian biometric passport meets all standards set by International Civil Aviation Organization.

A priority service is available for an additional fee. Priority passports (Pasaporta me procedurë të shpejtë) are issued within 3 days of the application.

== Biometric passport ==
Biometric passports and biometric ID cards started to be issued on 24 May 2009. The switch to a biometric passport was one of the conditions for the Schengen Area visa liberalisation for Albanians. On 8 November 2010, the Council of the European Union approved visa-free travel to the EU for citizens of Albania. The decision entered into force on 15 December 2010. (Note: Regulation (EU) No 1091/2010 of the European Parliament and of the Council of 24 November 2010 amending Council Regulation (EC) No 539/2001 listing the third countries whose nationals must be in possession of visas when crossing the external borders and those whose nationals are exempt from that requirement. No longer in force, Date of end of validity: 17/12/2018; Repealed by 32018R1806.)

To obtain a passport, Albanian citizens must pay the fee at a local post office, then present the 'coupon' to their local registry office. There, the citizen's photograph is taken and their fingerprints are digitized. The data collected is sent to the production center in Tirana. Passports must then be picked up at the nearest directorate of the State Police.

Since March 2011, biometric passports and identity cards can also be requested at Albanian consulates in the United Kingdom, the US and Canada, Greece and Italy, and the rest of Europe to serve immigrants who live there. Fees vary, depending on the region in which you apply.

In April 2025, IdentiTek, the state-owned company which produces Albanian biometric documents, launched an online service to supplement the post office coupon system. Citizens can opt to purchase an e-coupon and apply immediately.

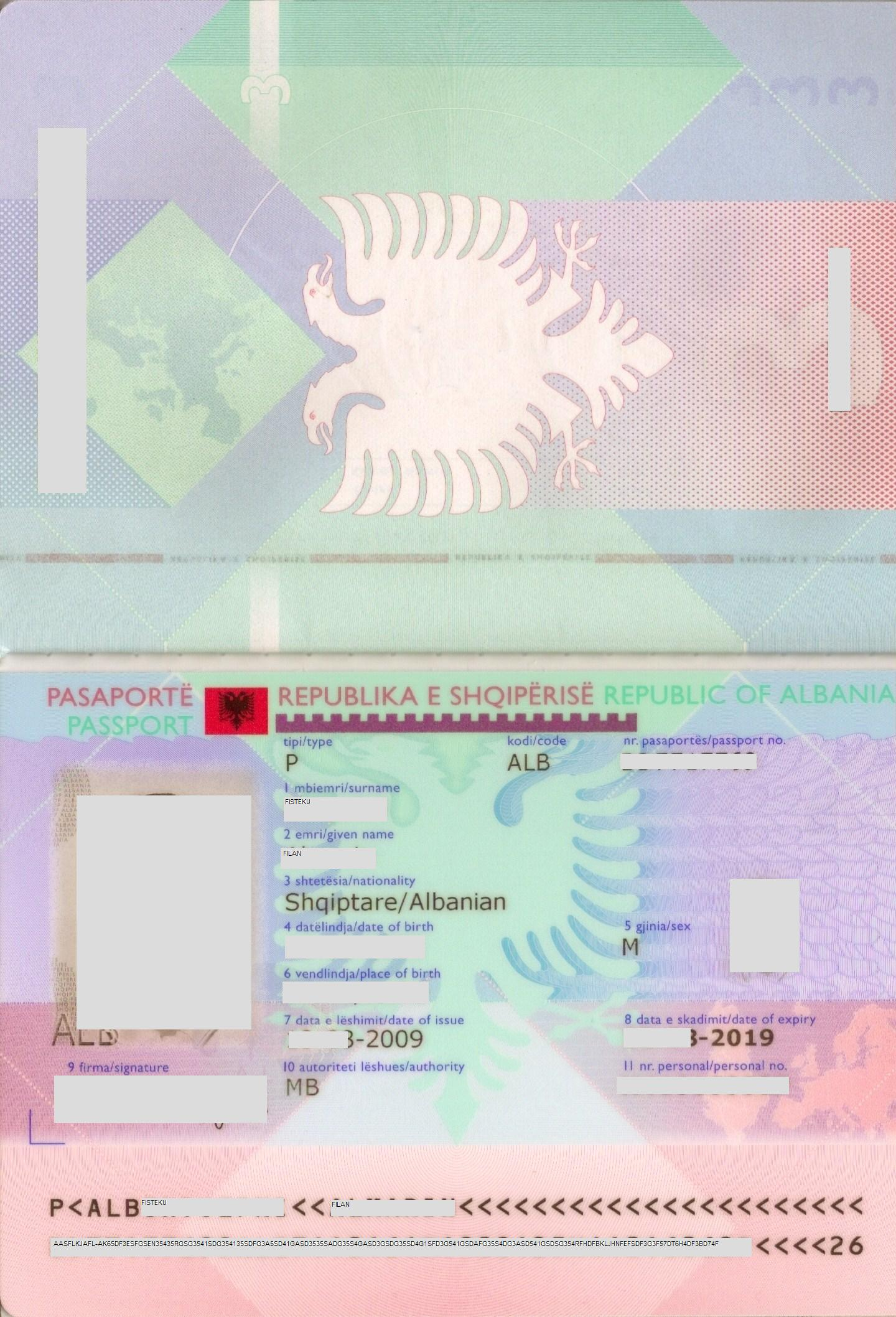
Rigid data page of the biometric passport, made from polycarbonate plastic with the microchip embedded.

=== Physical appearance ===
The data page of the passport is from rigid polycarbonate plastic and contains a microchip embedded in which are stored biometric data of the holder including fingerprints, photo and signature. The data is extracted from the chip with wireless RFID technology.

The photo on the page can be scanned and is replied by side and it is UV reactive. It has an alphanumeric code at the bottom of the data page which is machine-readable with optical scanners. The code includes microprinting, holographic images, images visible only with UV light, filigree and other details.

The data is written in Albanian and English. Previously, from 1991 to circa 2002, passports were also translated into French.

== History ==
The first Albanian passports were issued in the 1920s, during the consolidation of the Albanian state. During the communist period, from 1945 to 1991, Albania did not allow its citizens to travel abroad and did not issue ordinary passports, with only a limited number of diplomatic and service passports being issued. Since 1991, passports have been issued to any Albanian citizen who requests one.

- From 1991 to 1996, passports were red and did not contain any safety features, if not a dry stamp on the photo. The data was written by hand. It still had the Albanian communist coat of arms.
- From 1996 until 2002, passport were brown and had the first security elements, with the data page and the photo being laminated. The data was written by machine. They were manufactured by a Canadian company.
- From 2002 to 2009, passports were red and had safety standards and anti-counterfeiting features, similar to the biometric passport, except without the microchip. They were manufactured by the German firm Bundesdruckerei.
- Since 2009, biometric passports are burgundy, in line with guidelines set by the European Union. They are manufactured by the French company Sagem Sécurité.

== Visa requirements ==
Visa requirements for Albanian citizens Albania Freedom of Movement (ID card travel) - (Albania, North Macedonia, Kosovo, Serbia, Bosnia and Herzegovina) Visa free access Visa on arrival eVisa Visa available both on arrival or online Online Visa Visa required

Visa requirements for Albanian citizens are administrative entry restrictions by the authorities of other nations placed on citizens of Albania.

As of 31 October 2024, Albanian citizens had visa-free or visa on arrival access to 123 countries and territories, ranking the Albanian passport 44th in terms of travel freedom according to the Henley Passport Index.

The Albanian passport is one of the 5 passports with the most improved rating globally since 2006 in terms of number of countries that its holders may visit without a visa.

== Gallery ==
Albanian passports

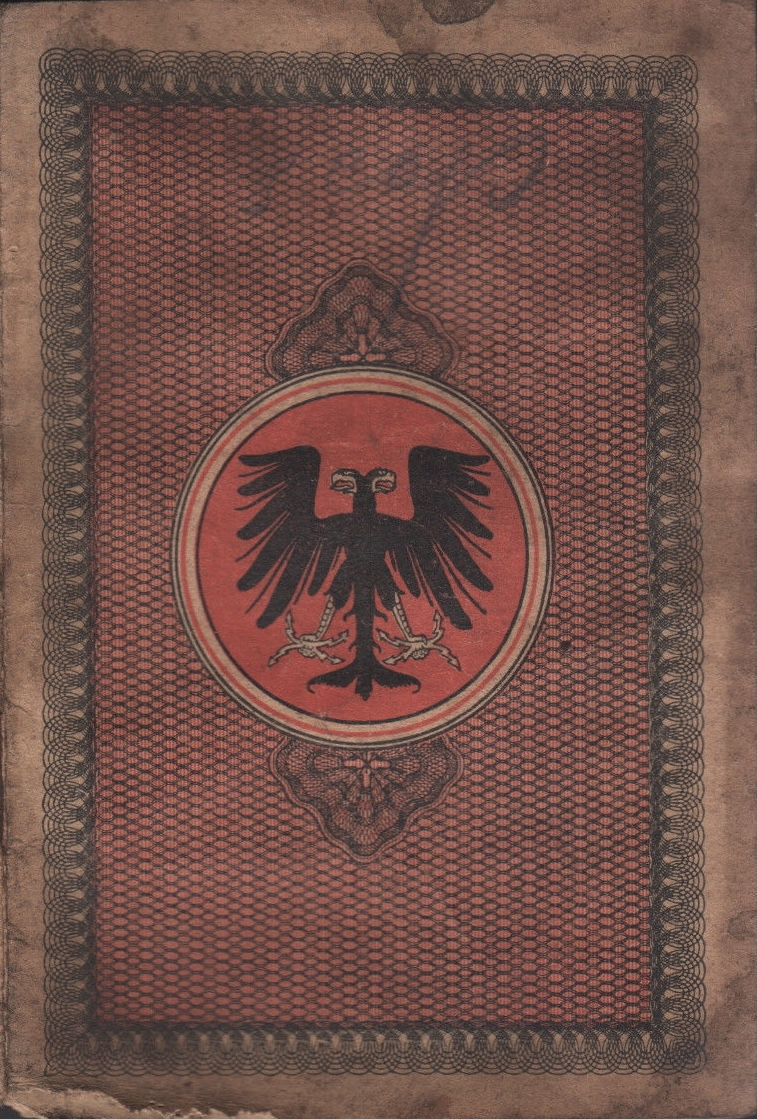
1924 Albanian passport

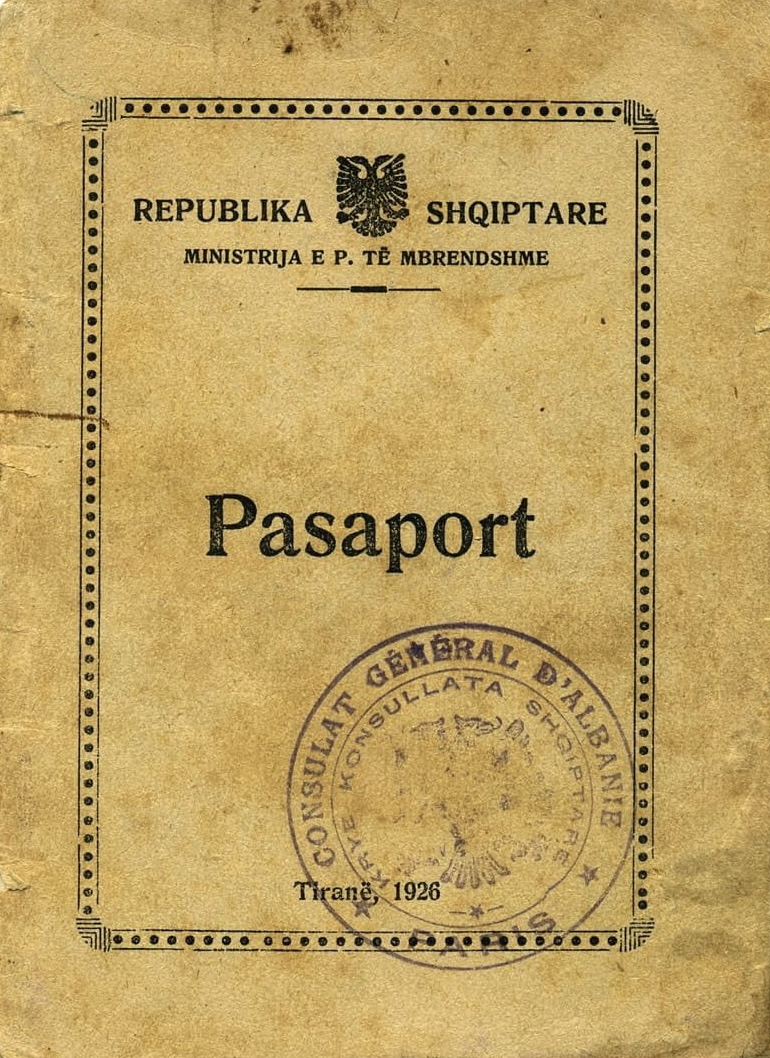
1926 Albanian passport

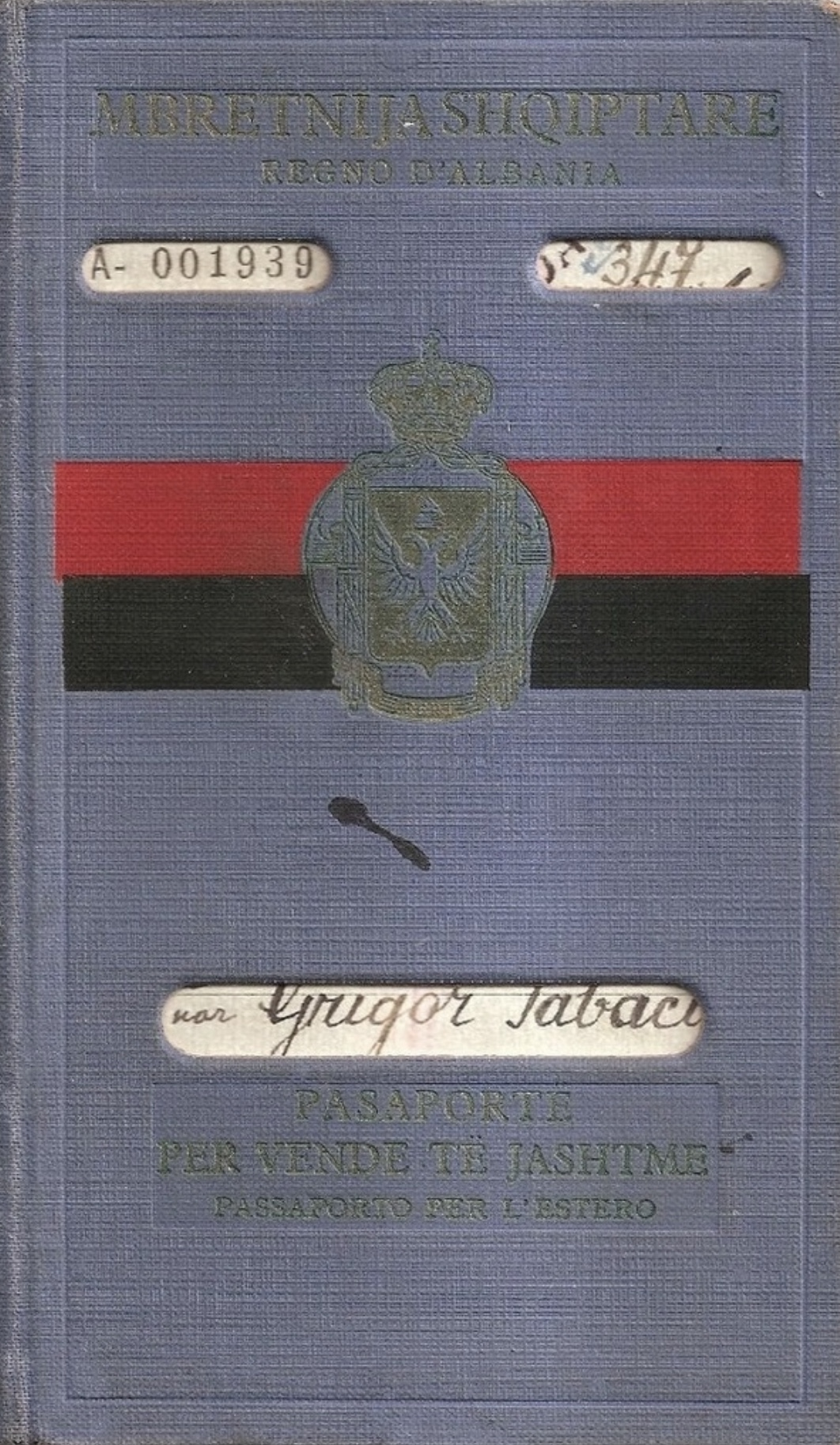
1939 Albanian passport

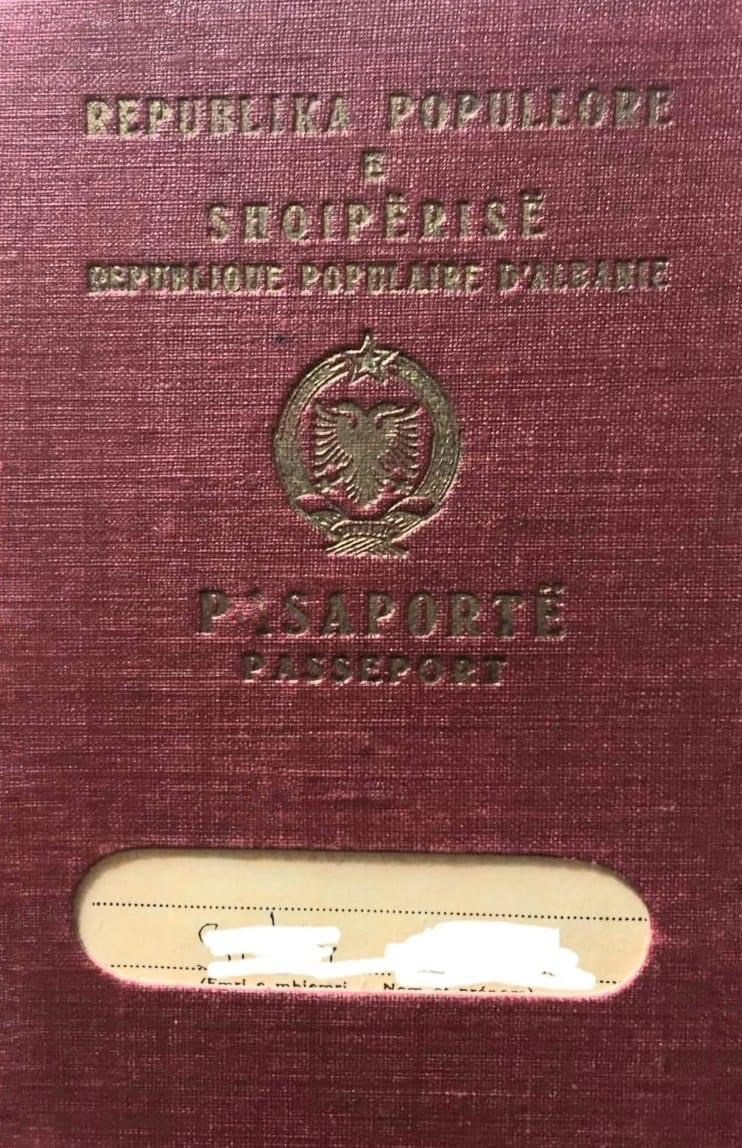
1966 Albanian passport

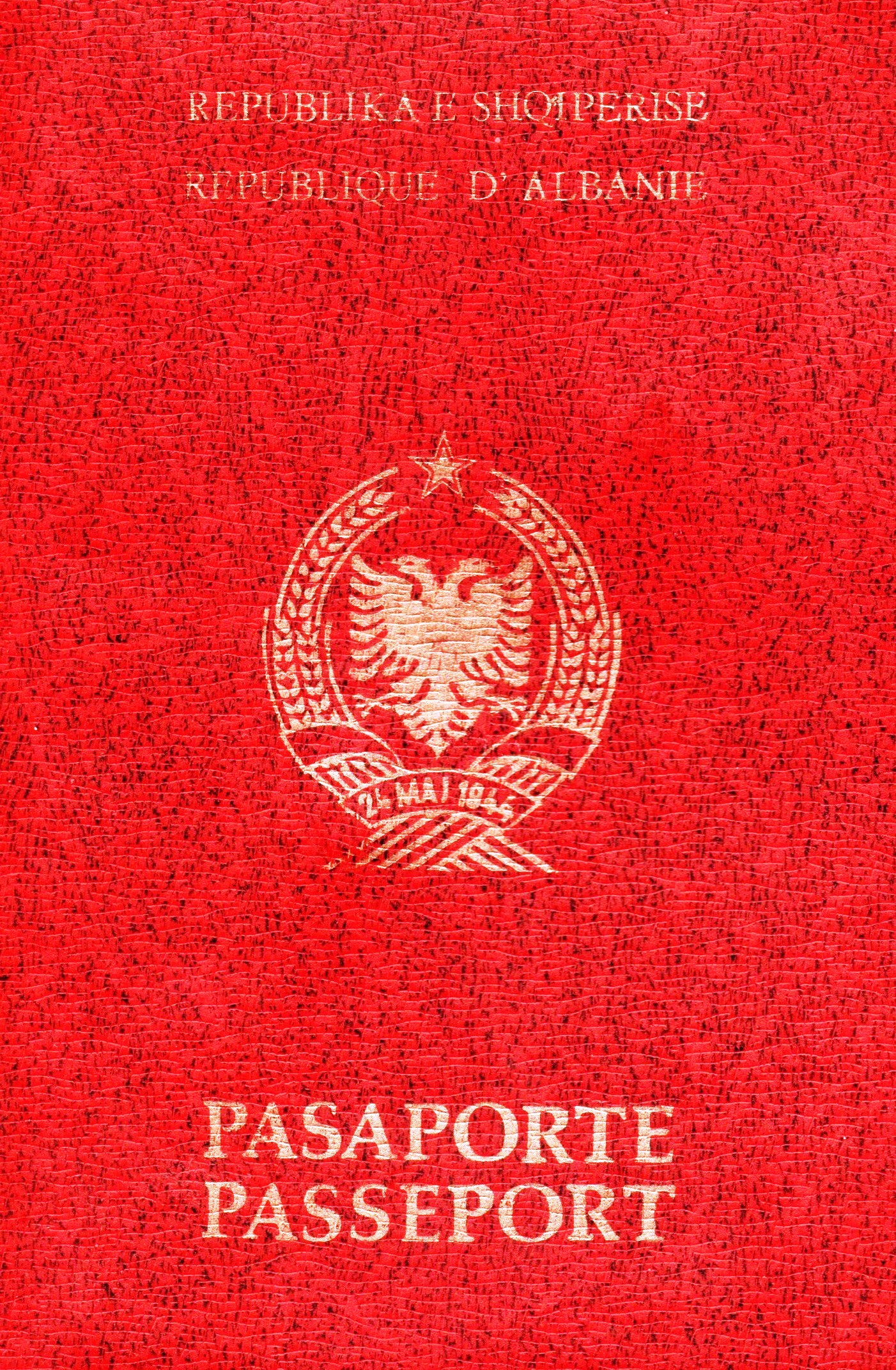
1991 Albanian passport

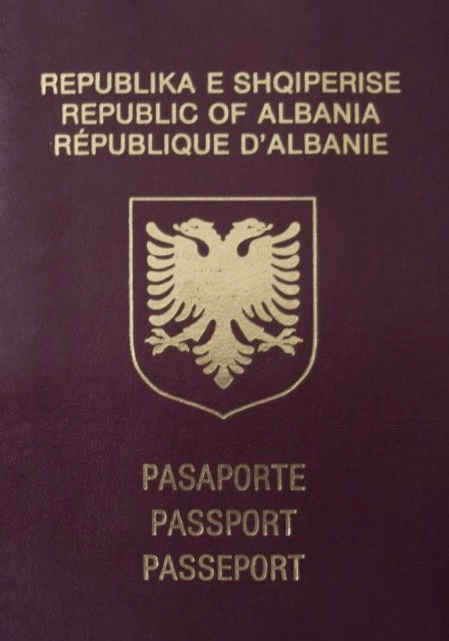
1996 Albanian passport

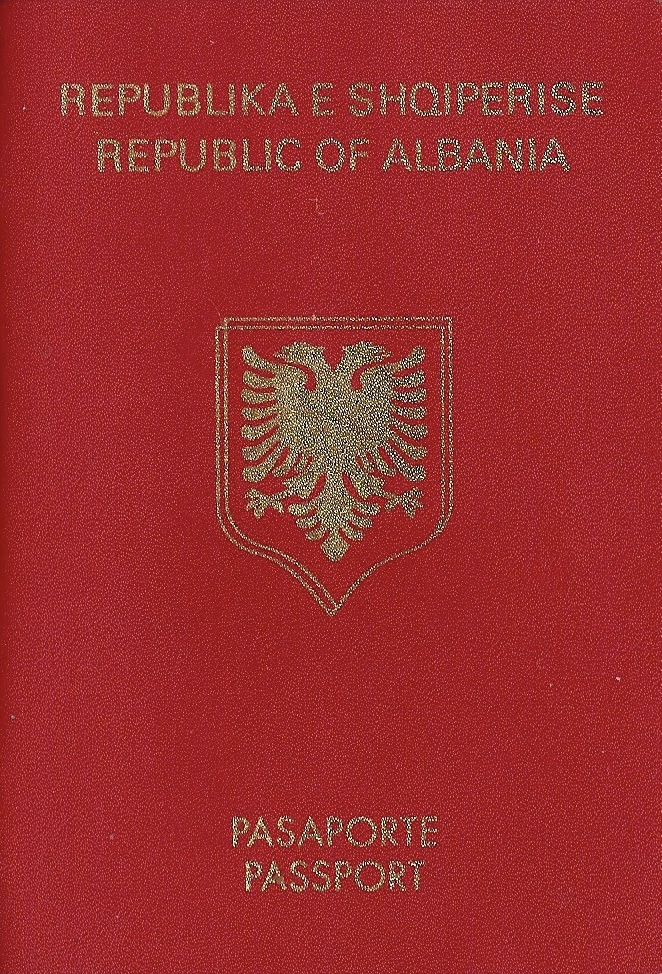
2002 Albanian passport

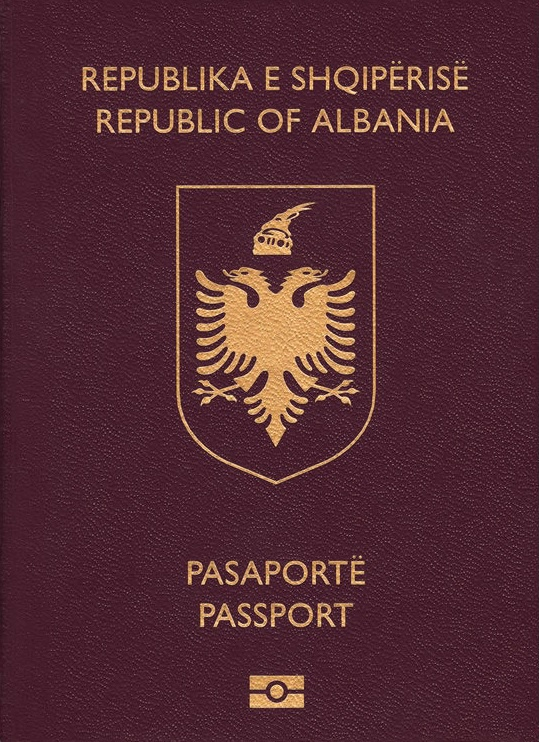
2009 Albanian biometric passport

== See also ==
- Albanian identity card
- Visa requirements for Albanian citizens
- List of passports
- List of diplomatic missions in Albania
- List of diplomatic missions of Albania
- Foreign relations of Albania
- Border crossings of Albania
