= Albanian identity card =

National identity card of Albania

Letërnjoftim
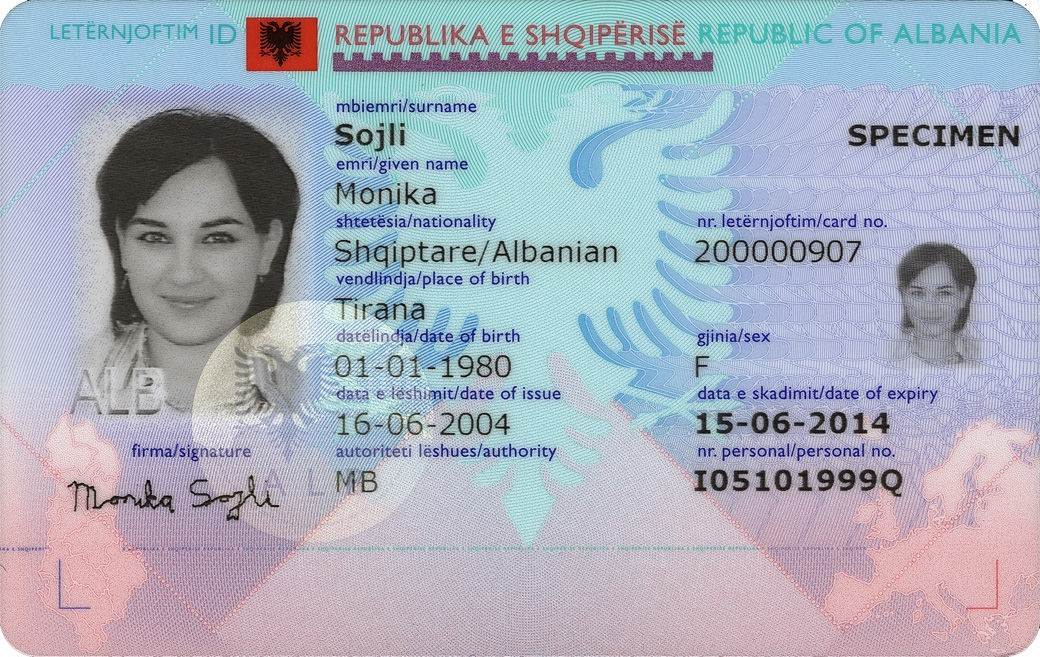
- View of the front

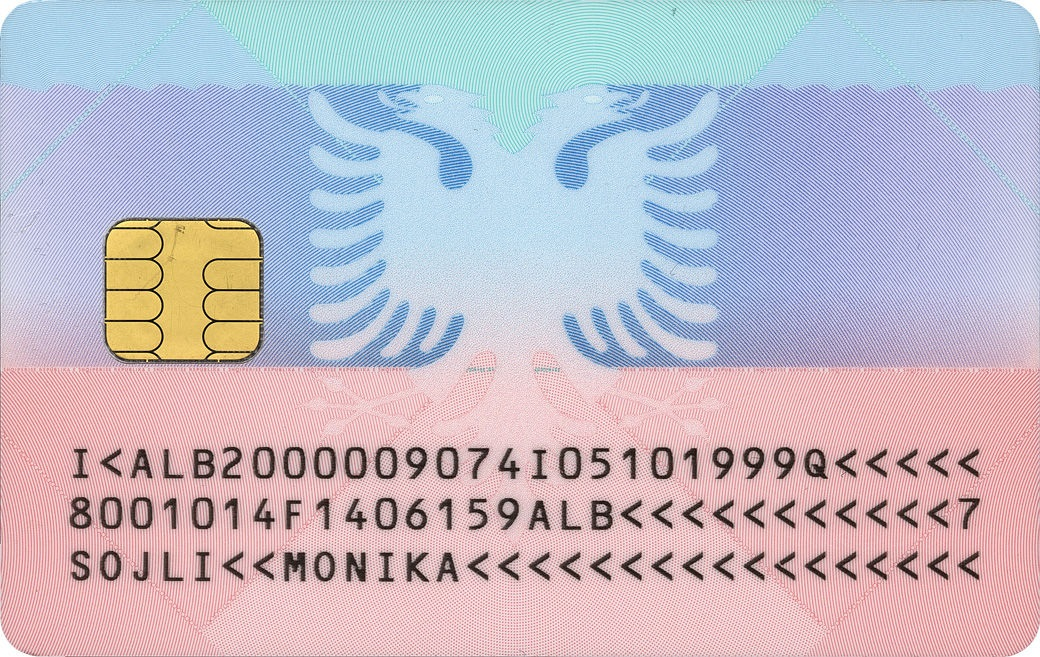
- View of the back
- Issued by: Albania
- First issued: 12 January 2009
- Purpose: Identification
- Valid in: Albania Bosnia and Herzegovina; Kosovo; North Macedonia; Montenegro; Serbia
- Expiration: 10 years (16-74); Does not expire (75+)
- Cost: 1,500 leke

The Albanian identity card (Albanian: Letërnjoftim) is a national identity card issued by the Interior Ministry to Albanian citizens. It serves as proof of identity, citizenship, and residence. The current version is issued in the ID1 format and is biometric. The card is compulsory for citizens over 16 years of age, costs 1,500 lekë (about €15), and is valid for 10 years. If the bearer is 75 years old or older, the card is issued without an expiration date.

== History ==
Albania issued identity cards to citizens until 1991, the year the previous political system collapsed. For 18 years, in the absence of such a document, people were obliged to provide birth certificates with photos, which was considered inconvenient.

In 2007, with assistance from the Organization for Security and Co-operation in Europe, a central population database was created. After that, Albanian authorities called an international tender for the production of identity cards. The tender was won by the French company Sagem Sécurité (Morpho, Safran Group). Albania commenced issuing identity cards on 12 January 2009.

== Appearance ==
The Albanian ID card is a plastic credit card size card. The front contains the bearer's photo and the following fields, written in Albanian and English:

- Nationality: Shqiptare/Albanian
- Document number
- Full name, including surname and all given names
- Photograph (both printed and processed to watermark)
- Date of birth
- Place of birth
- Sex
- Personal number
- Authority
- Date of issue
- Date of expiry (normally 10 years after the date of issue)
- Signature

On the photo a micro-holographic reflecting stamp is placed. The back contains the machine readable zone. The microchip, visible on the back contains biometric data such as fingerprints of the holder, the image, signature, etc. The data can be extracted from the chip with wireless RFID technology. The ID card serves as a travel document for international travel between a limited number of countries.

== Issuing procedure ==
Albania's biometric documents are produced by the state-owned company IdentiTek.

An Albanian identity card is requested at the local municipality (after paying the required fee; presently 1,500 lek or about €10 at the post office) where a digital picture of the bearer's face and fingerprints are taken. The card can be picked up in person after about 15 days, when the bearer identifies themselves with their fingerprints.

== Countries ==
An Albanian ID Card is accepted as a travel document by the following countries:

- Bosnia and Herzegovina
- Kosovo
- North Macedonia
- Montenegro
- Serbia

== Electronic services ==
Trust services were initially offered through the card, including authentication and signing. Citizens were able to use the card to sign in to the e-government portal, e-Albania, provided they were equipped with a card reader. The card could also be used to digitally sign documents, which would have full legal effect equal to that of an actual signature. These services were shut down after the responsibility for issuing identity cards was transferred to IdentiTek.

== See also ==
- Albanian passport
- Driving licence in Albania
- Border crossings of Albania
