= Morpho =

Morpho may refer to:

- Morpho (genus), a genus of butterflies
- Morpho (company), a French identification verification company
- Morpho Knight, from Kirby
- Lumen's name in the Japanese release of the Azure Striker Gunvolt series
