= AirTag (company) =

Mobile shopping and payments provider

- Type: Private
- Industry: Mobile commerce, NFC, Mobile payments
- Founded: 2006
- Founders: Jérémie Leroyer, Cyrille Porteret, Cedric Nicolas, Gunnar Graef
- Fate: Acquired by Morpho (Safran subsidiary) in 2015; dissolved in 2018
- Headquarters: Paris, France
- Products: NFC SDKs, Mobile payment apps, Retail loyalty solutions
- Number of employees: 50 (2014)
- Parent: Morpho (acquired 2015); IDEMIA Identity et Security France (sole shareholder until 2018)

AirTag was a French startup that was acquired by Morpho, at the time a Safran subsidiary, in 2015. It was a mobile shopping and payments provider.

== History ==
AirTag was founded in 2006 by Jérémie Leroyer, Cyrille Porteret, Cedric Nicolas and Gunnar Graef. As of late 2012, investors had provided €6 million in seed capital, following a second-round in 2011 when it secured €4 million.

In October 2008, AirTag launched what it called the first NFC software development kit (SDK). It included an NFC reader and four types of NFC tags. In 2012, the company launched another SDK. This one included hardware for smartphone-based payments.

In 2009, AirTag and its partner Netsize launched Airtag Pad, an in-store terminal for clients to check their loyalty points, ask about tailored products, etc. Reebok hired it for its line of Go Sport stores.

Nokia C7, the world's first smartphone with an NFC chip, was able to pick up loyalty points and discount coupons on the phone, through a partnership with AirTag.

AirTag built McDonald's France smartphone app GoMcDo which was one of the first to integrate with Apple's Passbook soon after the latter's initial launch with iOS 6 in 2012.

In 2012, Carrefour's mobile app for near-field communication (NFC) purchasing was built by AirTag. In 2013, French newspaper L'Express ranked AirTag among the top 30 French internet startups. That same spring, AirTag launched KFC’s first mobile wallet to order and pay via smartphone; three months later, 90% of those installing the app were placing orders through it. Late that year, AirTag admitted it was not profitable.

In 2014, the company had 50 employees when it launched mobile commerce applications for Dia France and for Brioche Dorée.

On November 28, 2018, the sole shareholder IDEMIA Identity et Security France (Courvevoie) decided to dissolve Airtag early without liquidation.

== Criticism ==
Whereas AirTag said it launched the first NFC SDK in late 2008, industry magazine RFID Update said at the time that there were pre-existing SDK's from Nokia and from Alvin Systems.
