= List of diplomatic missions in Albania =

This article lists diplomatic missions resident in Albania. At present, the capital city of Tirana hosts 45 embassies and a Delegation of the European Commission. The southern cities of Gjirokastër, Korçë, and Vlorë, each host one career consulate-general.

Several other countries have ambassadors accredited to Albania, with most being resident in Athens or Rome.

Honorary consulates and trade missions are omitted from this listing.

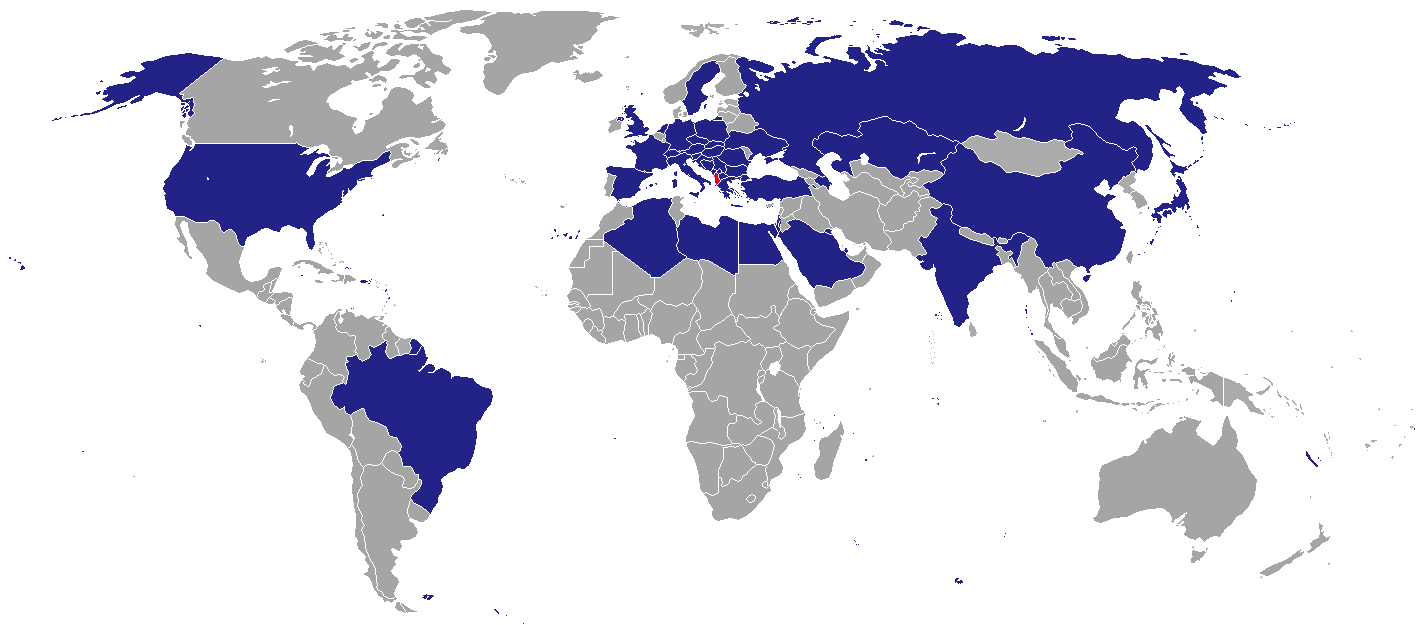
Map of diplomatic missions in Albania

== Diplomatic missions in Tirana ==
=== Embassies ===
1. Austria
2. Azerbaijan
3. Belgium
4. Bosnia and Herzegovina
5. Brazil
6. Bulgaria
7. China
8. Croatia
9. Czechia
10. Denmark
11. Egypt
12. France
13. Germany
14. Greece
15. Holy See
16. Hungary
17. India
18. Israel
19. Italy
20. Japan
21. Kazakhstan
22. Kosovo
23. Kuwait
24. Libya
25. Montenegro
26. Netherlands
27. North Macedonia
28. Palestine
29. Poland
30. Qatar
31. Romania
32. Russia
33. San Marino
34. Saudi Arabia
35. Serbia
36. Slovakia
37. Slovenia
38. Sovereign Military Order of Malta
39. Spain
40. Sweden
41. Switzerland
42. Turkey
43. Ukraine
44. United Kingdom
45. United States

=== Other missions or delegations ===
1. Algeria (Embassy office) (Note: Subordinate to the embassy in Athens, Greece.)
2. Council of Europe (Office)
3. European Union (Delegation)
4. Iran (Interests section) (Note: Under the protecting power of Turkey.)
5. Organization for Security and Co-operation in Europe (Presence/Mission)
6. United Nations (Resident Coordinator's Office)
7. World Health Organization (Country Office)

=== Gallery ===
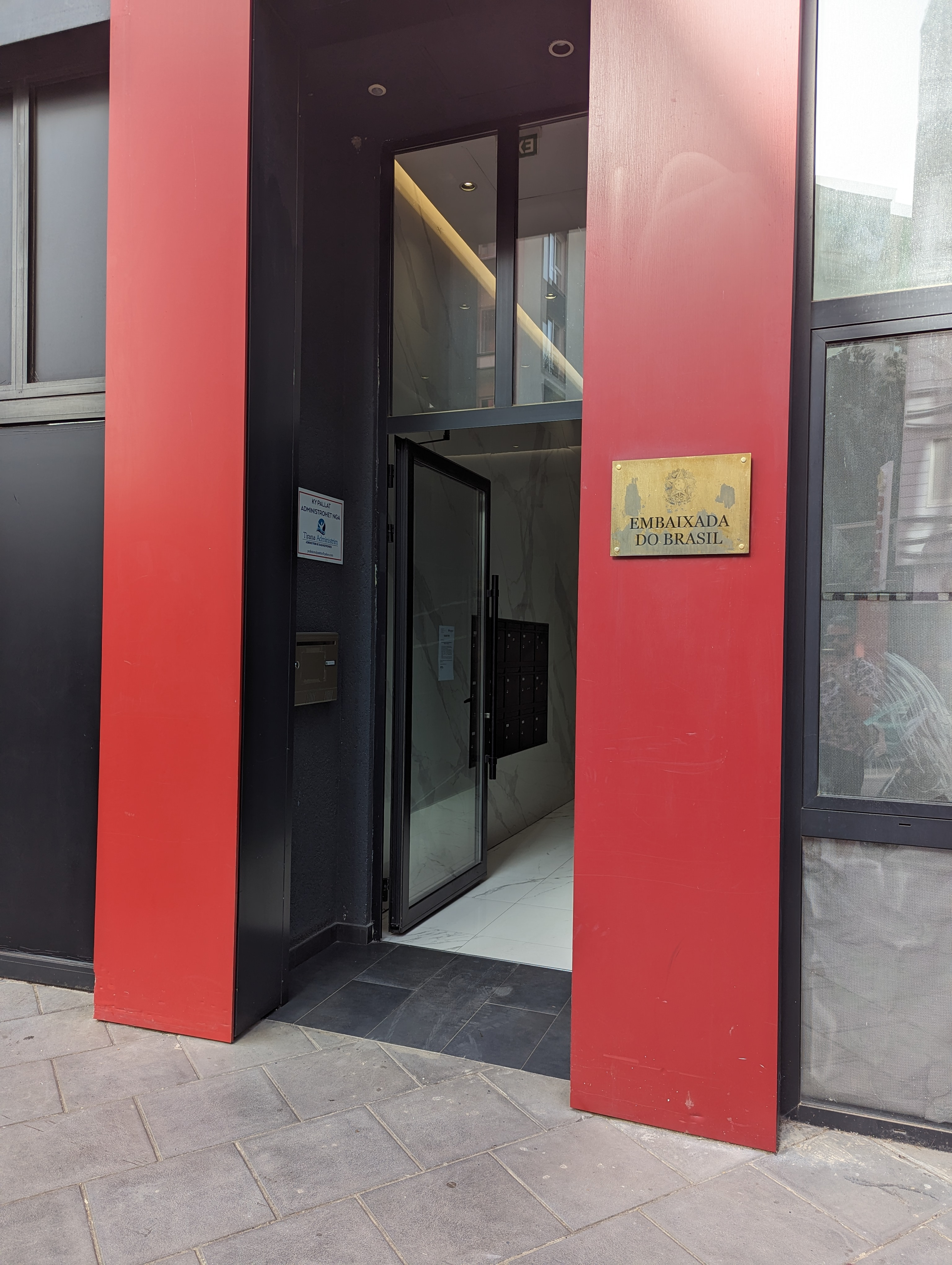
Embassy of Brazil

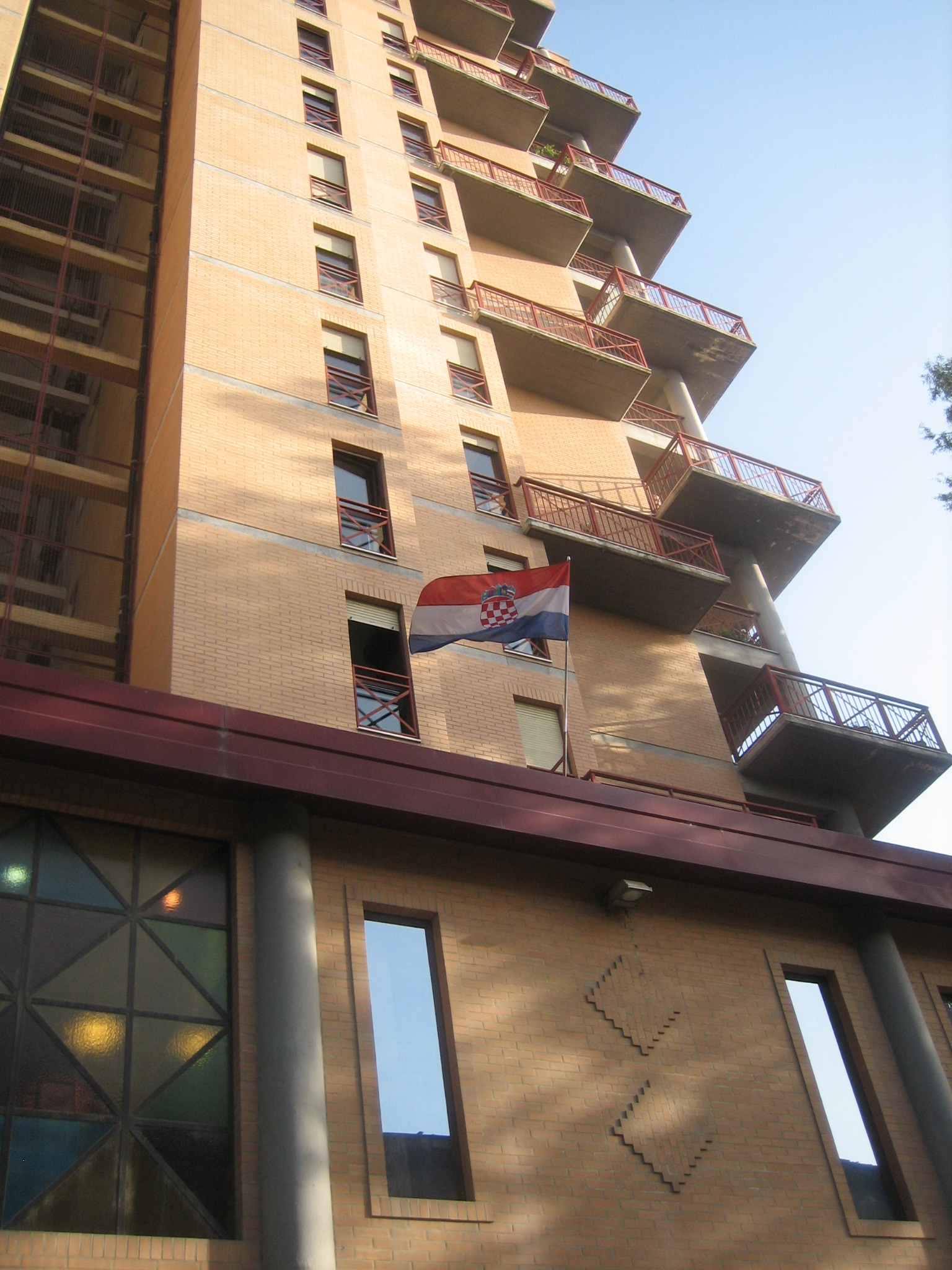
Embassy of Croatia

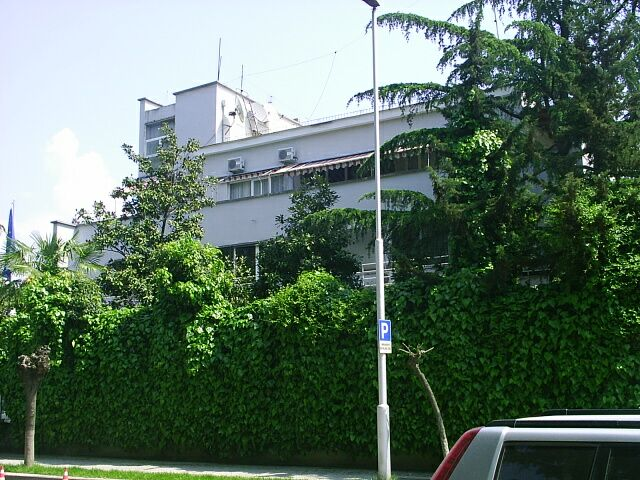
Embassy of the Czech Republic

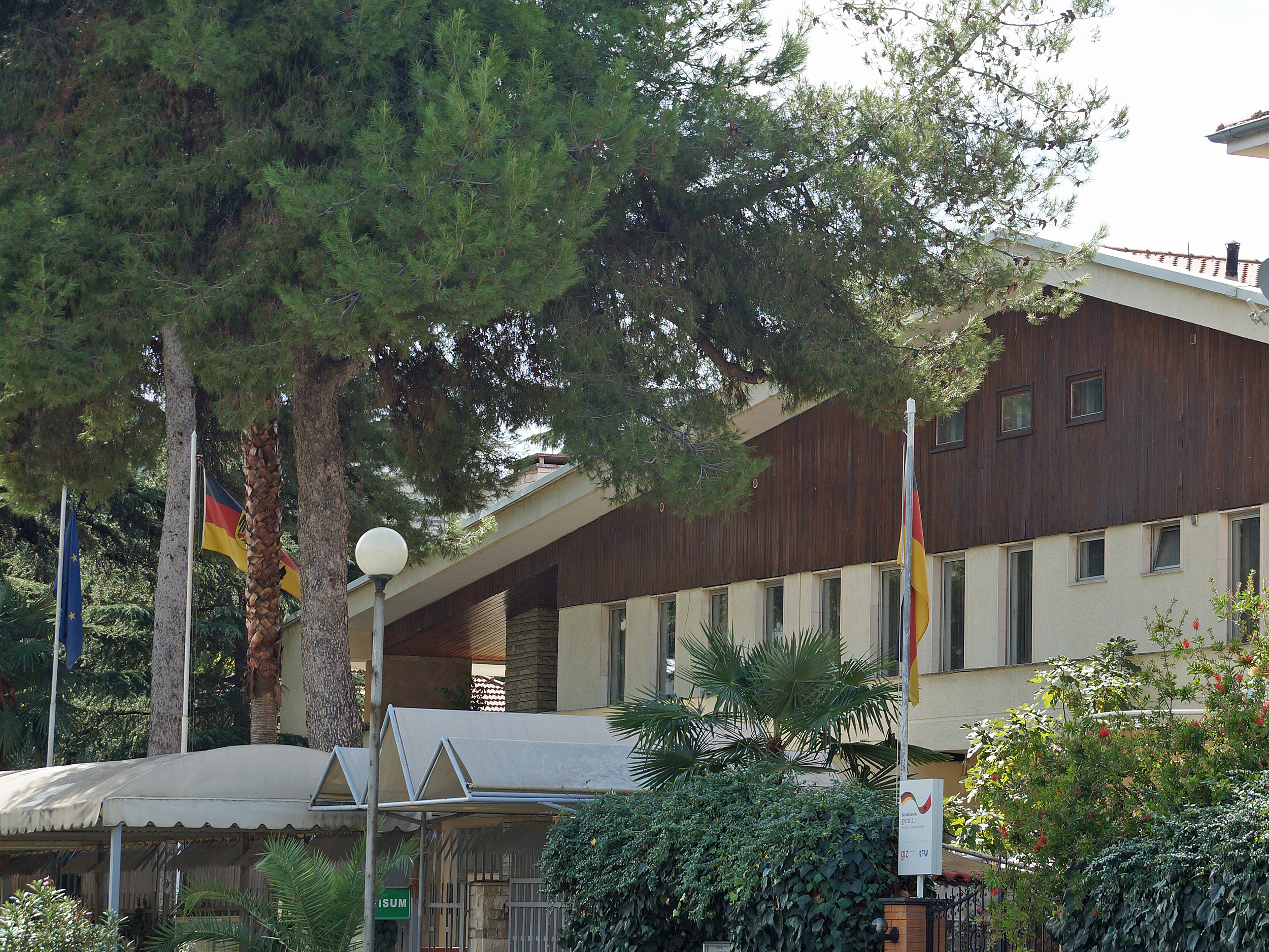
Embassy of Germany

Embassy of Greece

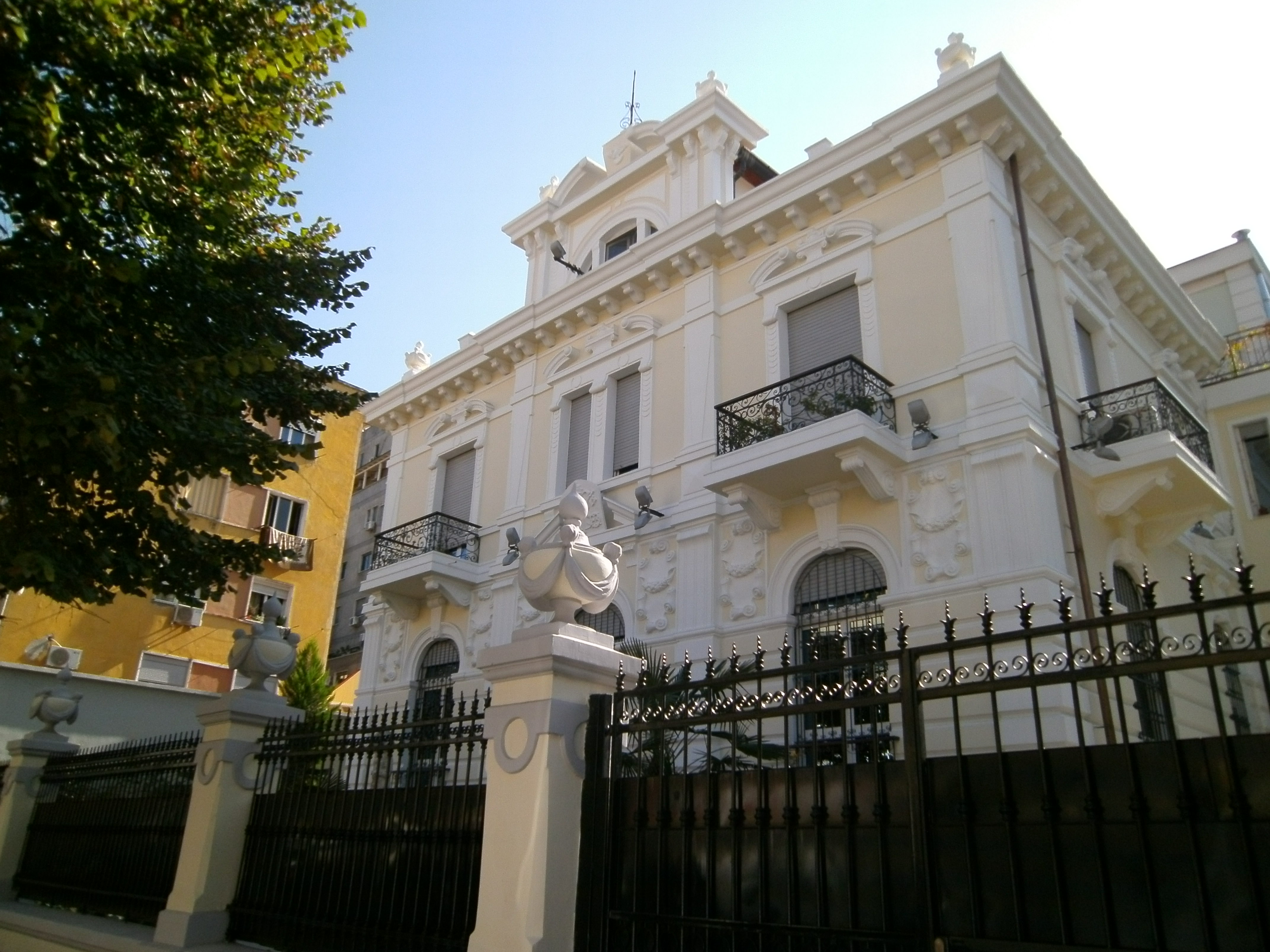
Apostolic Nunciature of the Holy See

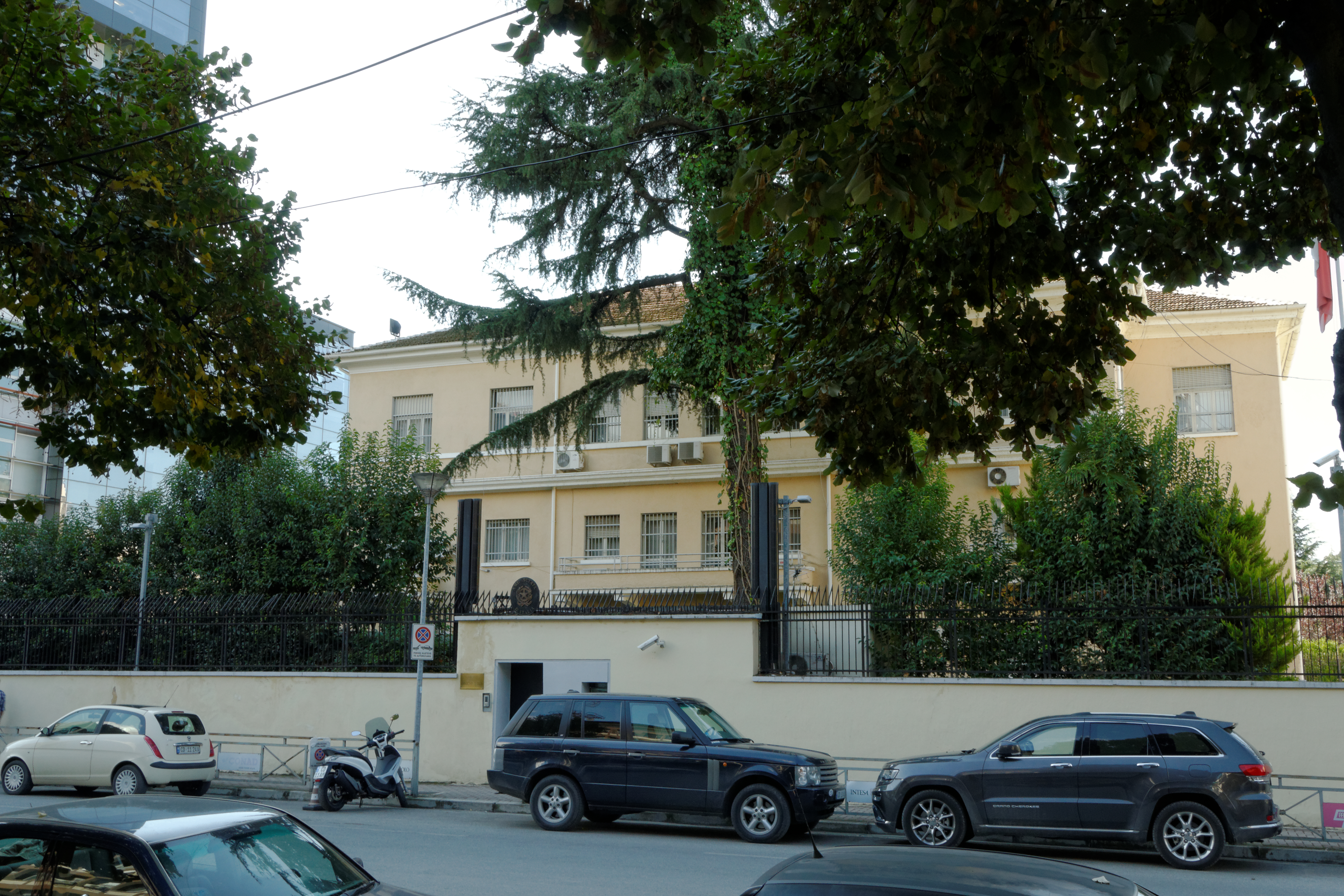
Embassy of Italy

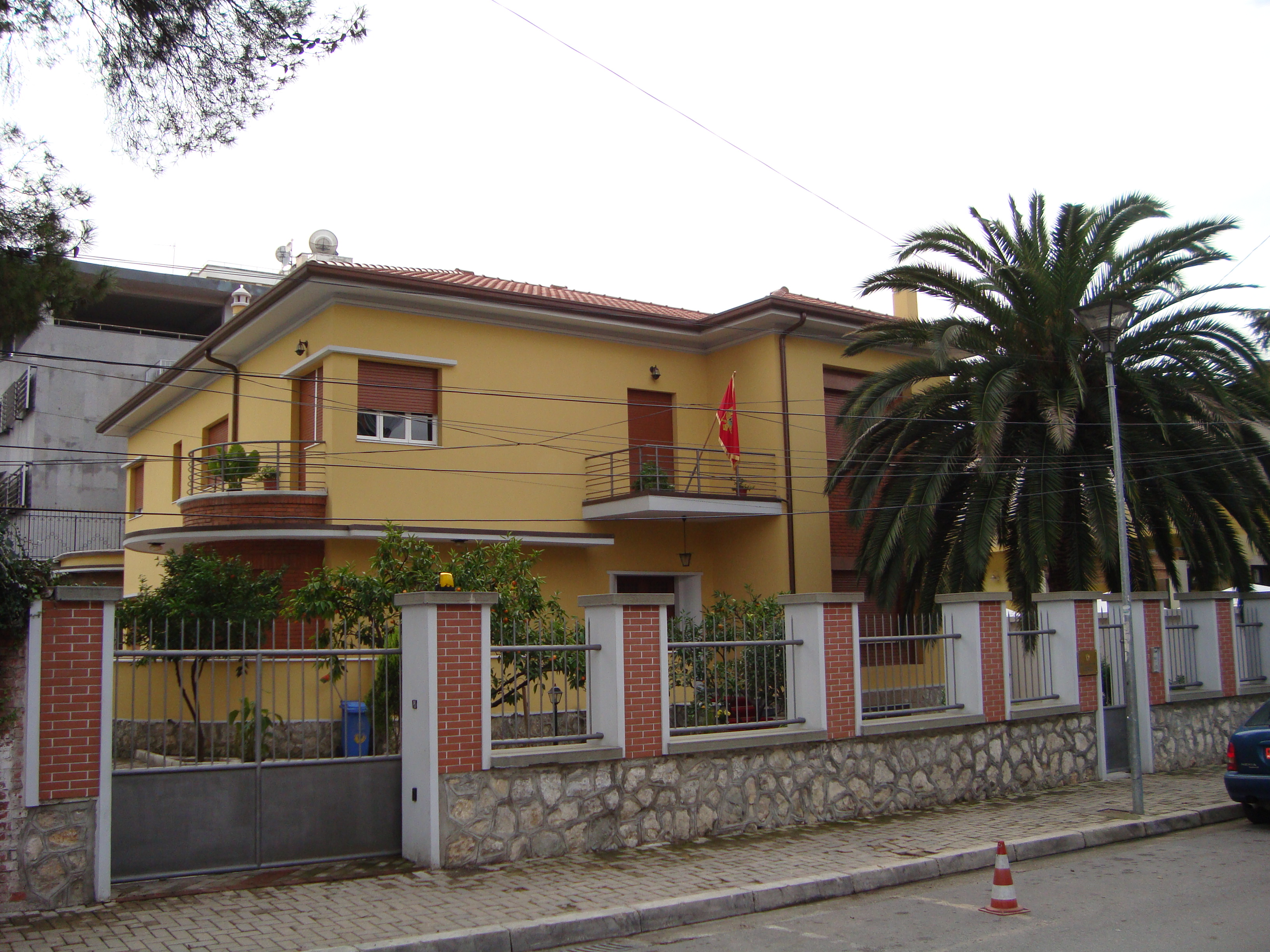
Embassy of Montenegro

Embassy of Poland

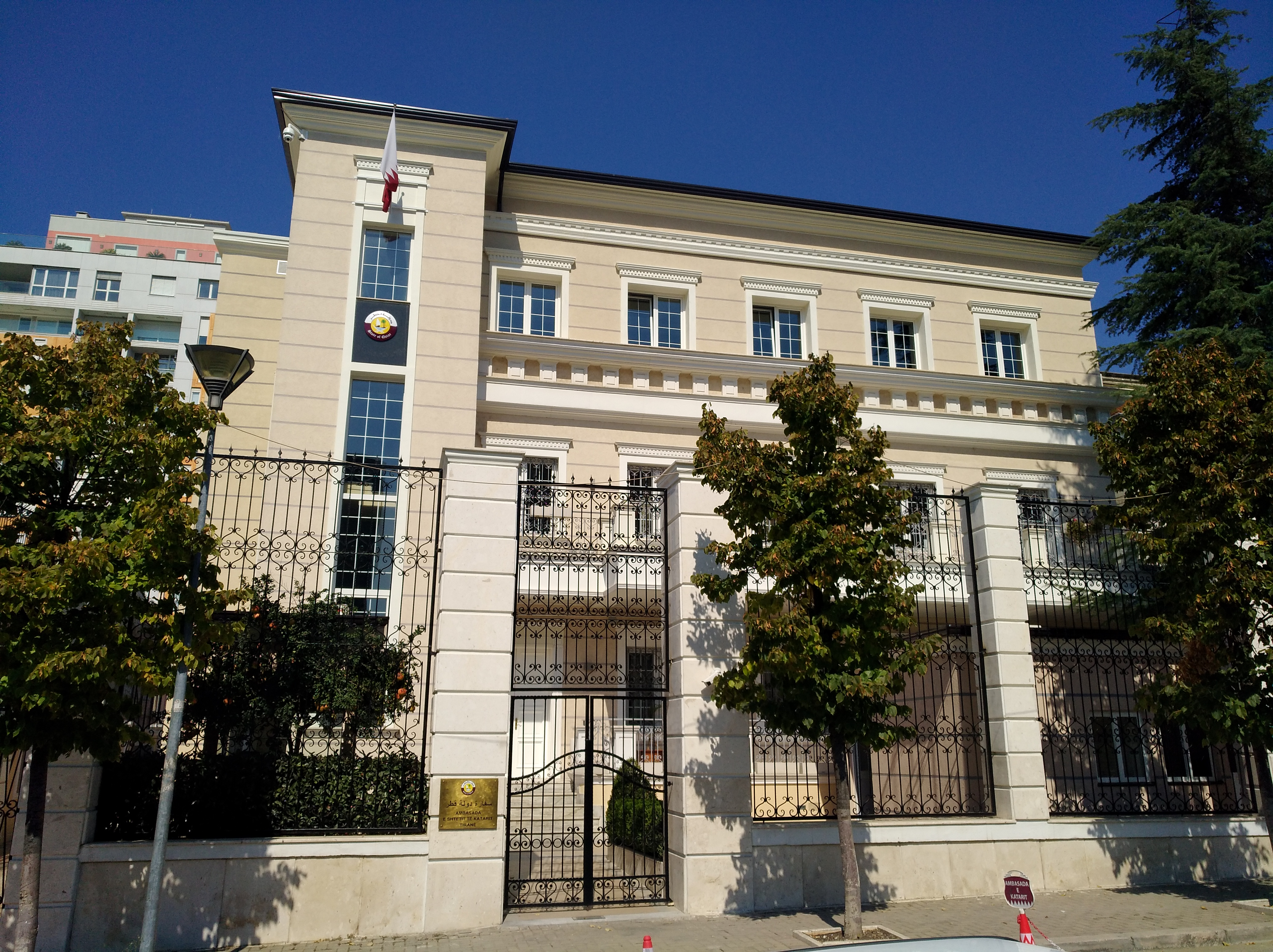
Embassy of Qatar

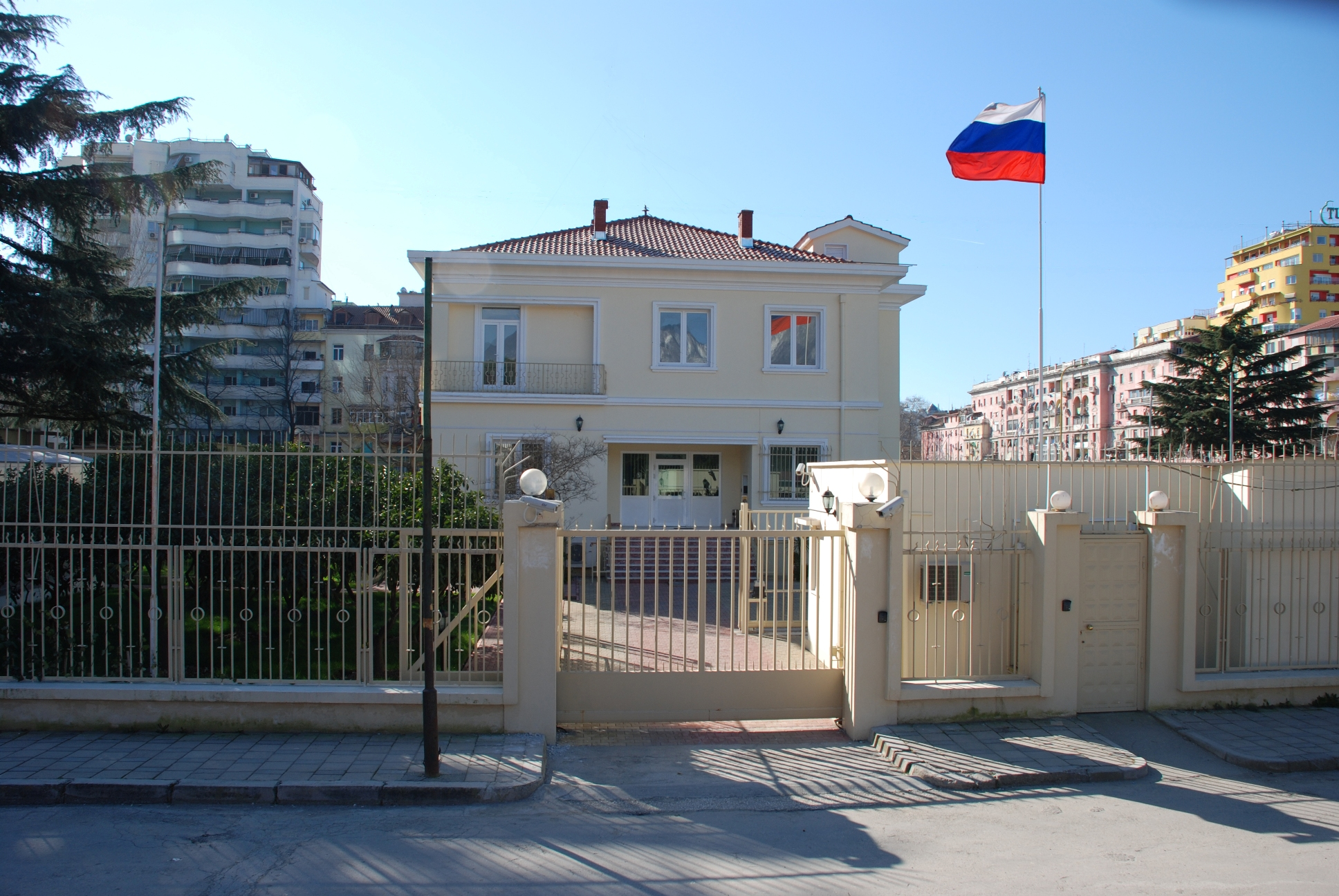
Embassy of Russia

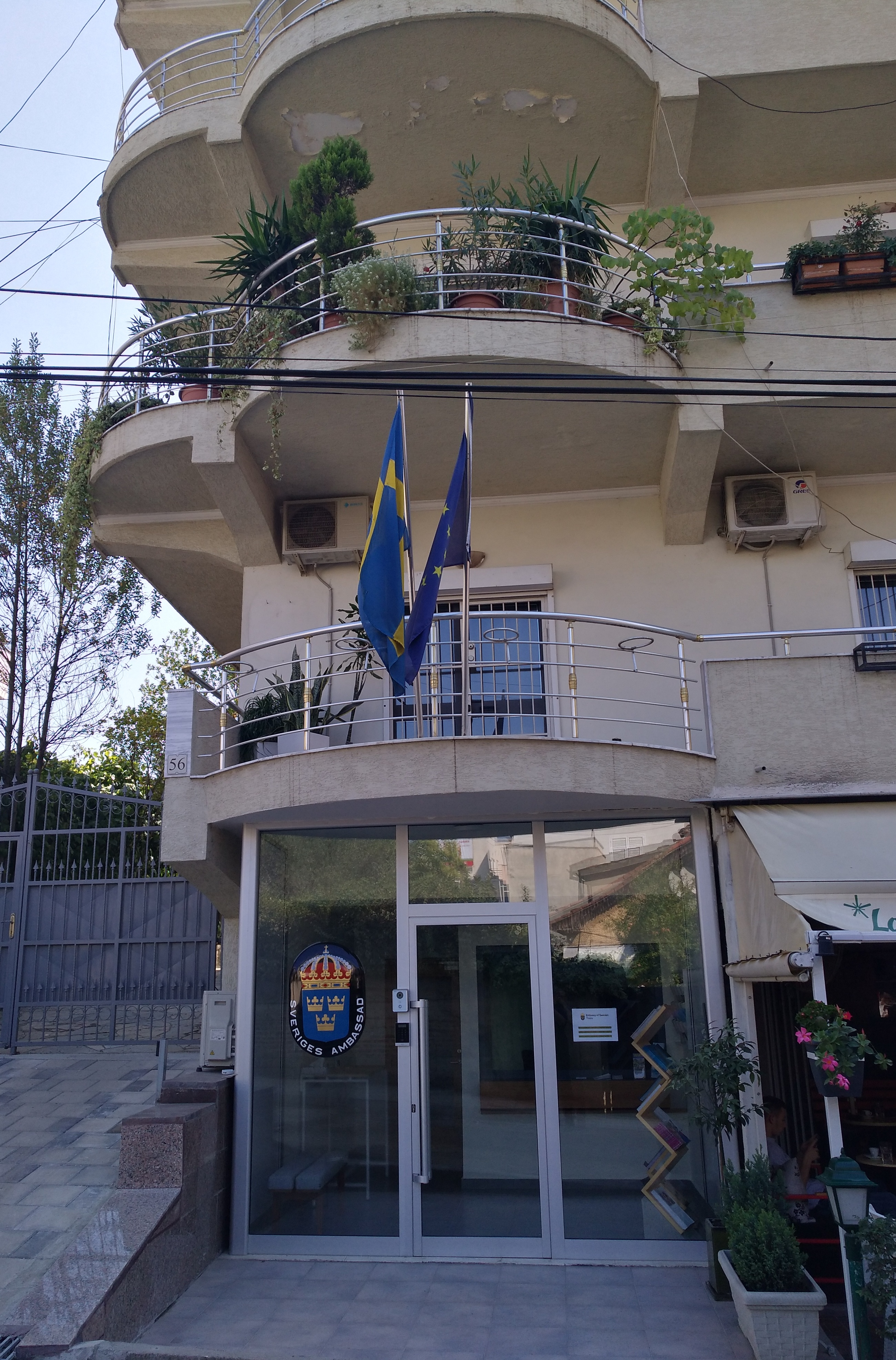
Embassy of Sweden

Embassy of Switzerland

Embassy of the United Kingdom

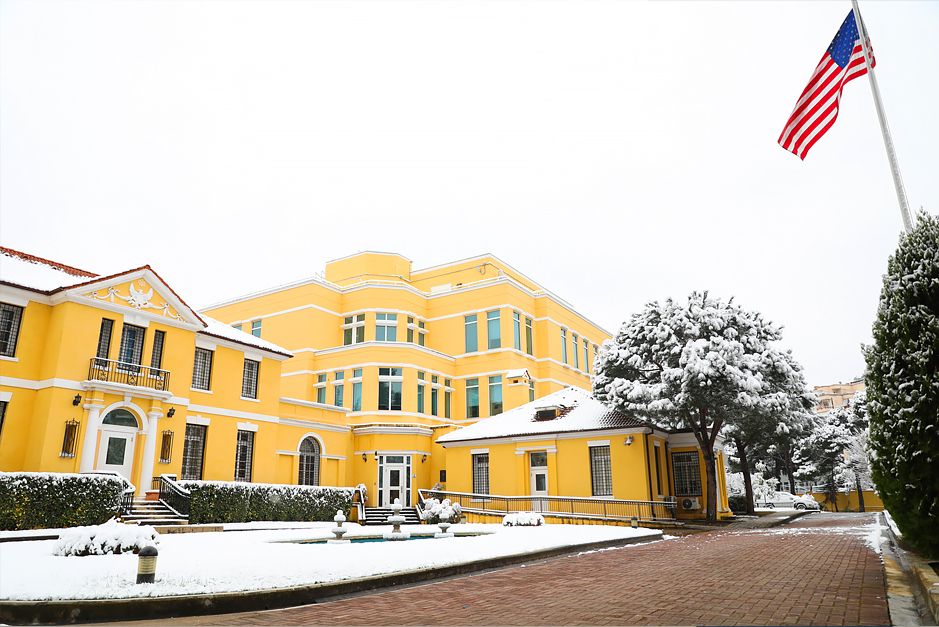
Embassy of the United States

== Consular missions ==
The cities of Gjirokastër, Korçë, and Vlorë are host to career consular missions. All are consulates-general unless otherwise indicated.

=== Gjirokastër, Gjirokastër County ===
- Greece

=== Korçë, Korçë County ===
- Greece

=== Vlorë, Vlorë County ===
- Italy

== Non-resident embassies accredited to Albania ==
=== Resident in Ankara, Turkey ===
1. Bahrain
2. Georgia
3. Ghana

=== Resident in Athens, Greece ===
1. Afghanistan
2. Algeria
3. Armenia
4. Bangladesh
5. Cyprus
6. Estonia
7. Finland
8. Ireland
9. Jordan
10. Lebanon
11. Lithuania
12. Peru
13. South Korea
14. Syria
15. Tunisia
16. United Arab Emirates
17. Vietnam

=== Resident in Rome, Italy ===
1. Angola
2. Argentina
3. Australia
4. Belarus
5. Burkina Faso
6. Canada
7. Chile
8. Colombia
9. Costa Rica
10. Ecuador
11. Ethiopia
12. Honduras
13. Ivory Coast
14. Kenya
15. Latvia
16. Madagascar
17. Malaysia
18. Mali
19. Mauritania
20. Mexico
21. Mongolia
22. Morocco
23. New Zealand
24. Nigeria
25. Oman
26. Pakistan
27. Panama
28. Paraguay
29. Philippines
30. Portugal
31. Senegal
32. South Africa
33. Sri Lanka
34. Thailand
35. Tanzania
36. Uganda
37. Uruguay
38. Yemen

=== Resident in Sofia, Bulgaria ===
1. Cuba
2. Indonesia
3. Iraq
4. Moldova
5. North Korea
6. Venezuela

=== Resident in other cities ===
1. Benin (Paris)
2. Iceland (Reykjavík)
3. Laos (Budapest)
4. Luxembourg (Luxembourg City)
5. Malta (Valletta)
6. Namibia (Vienna)
7. Nepal (Berlin)
8. Norway (Zagreb)
9. Zambia (Moscow)

== Closed missions ==
Host city	Sending country	Mission	Year closed	Ref.
Tirana	Cuba	Embassy	1992	
Tirana	Iran	Embassy	2022	
Tirana	Mexico	Embassy	1979	
Tirana	Vietnam	Embassy	1992	
Shkodër	Italy	Consulate	2013	

== See also ==
- Foreign relations of Albania
- List of diplomatic missions of Albania
- Visa requirements for Albanian citizens
