= VaxTele SIP Server SDK =

VaxTele SIP Server SDK (Software Development Kit) is a complete development toolkit, which allows software vendors and Internet telephony service providers (ITSP) to develop SIP Server and (SIP) Session Initiation Protocol based VoIP systems for Microsoft Windows to install computer to computer voice chat, chat rooms, IVR systems, call center services, calling card services, dial/receive computer to PSTN (Public Switched Telephone Network) and mobile phone calling services.

== SIP Server Development ==
VaxTele SIP Server SDK supports Component Object Model (COM) based technology and can be incorporated in any Microsoft Windows-based application. It also includes technical manual, demo SIP Server, and sample codes for C#, Visual C++, Delphi and VB.NET development languages to understand about how to use VaxTele's COM component and accelerates the SIP Server development process.

== Develop IP-PBX Features ==
VaxTele SIP SDK, allows to add many IP-PBX (Private Branch Exchange) related features: voice mail, call transfer, chat rooms, Interactive Voice Responses (IVR), multiuser conference call, auto call distribution, call queues and stealth listening.

== Connection with PSTN and Mobile Networks ==
There are different ways to connect VaxTele integrated SIP Server to PSTN and/or mobile network to dial and receive PSTN and mobile calls.

There are many SIP based PSTN and mobile gateways are available to connect VaxTele based SIP Server to PSTN and mobile network. Some of them are Cisco, Linksys, Dlink and Quintum.

There are many Internet Telephony Service Providers (ITSP) available on the internet, that already provide service to dial and receive SIP based phone calls to and from PSTN and mobile networks. It can connect to those service providers to dial and receive PSTN and mobile (local and long distance) calls. Some of them are: YuppyDialer, BroadVoice, inphonex and voxbone.

== See also ==
- Software Development Kit
- Asterisk
- Comparison of VoIP software
- List of SIP software
- IP PBX
