= Visa policy of Albania =

Policy on permits required to enter Albania

Visitors to Albania must obtain an e-Visa unless they are citizens from one of the visa-exempt countries.

All visitors must have a passport valid for at least 3 months. However, citizens of certain countries or territories are entitled to visa-free entry with an ID card in lieu of a passport.

The visa policy of Albania is based on the by Law No. 79/2021“On foreigners”, and by the Decision of the Council of Ministers No. 858, dated 29.12.2021 “On the definition of the criteria of procedures and documentation for entry, stay and treatment of foreigners in the Republic of Albania”, as amended”.

The visa policy of Albania is similar to the visa policy of the Schengen Area. It grants 90-day visa-free entry to all Schengen Annex II nationalities, except for Dominica, Timor-Leste, Grenada, Kiribati, Marshall Islands, Micronesia, Palau, Saint Lucia, Saint Vincent and the Grenadines, Samoa, Solomon Islands, Tonga and Tuvalu. It also grants visa-free entry to 6 additional countries – Armenia, Azerbaijan, China, Kazakhstan, Kuwait, Qatar, Saudi Arabia and Turkey.

== Visa policy map ==
Visa policy of Albania Albania Visa not required (1 year) Visa not required - may enter with an ID card (90 days) Visa not required (90 days) eVisa

== Visa exemption ==
=== Ordinary passports ===
Citizens of the following countries and territories may enter Albania without a visa for the following period:

1 year

- United States^{2}

90 days within any 180 days

- All European Union member states^{ID}

- Andorra
- Antigua and Barbuda^{1}
- Argentina
- Armenia^{1}
- Australia
- Azerbaijan^{1}
- Bahamas^{1}
- Barbados^{1}
- Bosnia and Herzegovina^{ID}
- Brazil
- Brunei^{1}
- Canada
- Chile
- China^{1}
- Colombia^{1}
- Costa Rica^{1}
- El Salvador^{1}
- Georgia^{1}
- Guatemala^{1}
- Honduras^{1}
- Hong Kong^{ID^{2}} ^{1}
- Iceland^{ID}
- Israel
- Japan
- Kosovo^{ID}
- Kuwait^{1}
- Liechtenstein^{ID}
- Macau^{1}
- Malaysia
- Mauritius^{1}
- Mexico^{1}
- Moldova^{1}
- Monaco^{ID}
- Montenegro^{ID}
- New Zealand
- Nicaragua^{1}
- North Macedonia^{ID}
- Norway^{ID}
- Panama^{1}
- Paraguay^{1}
- Peru^{1}
- Qatar^{T 1}
- Saint Kitts and Nevis^{1}
- Saudi Arabia^{T 1}
- San Marino^{ID}
- Serbia^{ID^{1}}
- Seychelles^{1}
- Singapore
- South Korea
- Switzerland^{ID}
- Taiwan
- Trinidad and Tobago^{1}
- Turkey^{1}
- Ukraine^{1}
- United Arab Emirates^{1}
- United Kingdom
- Uruguay^{1}
- Vatican City
- Venezuela^{1}

90 days within any 365 days

- Kazakhstan^{ID^{1}} ^{1}

_{ID - May enter with a national ID card (including Irish passport card) in lieu of a passport.}
_{ID^{1} - May enter Albania with a biometric national ID card in lieu of a passport.}
_{ID^{2} - May enter Albania with a permanent identity card in lieu of a passport.}
_{T - Temporary measure from 15 April 2026 until 31 December 2026.}
_{1 - Citizens of these countries or territories staying for more than 90 days are required to obtain a "D" visa.}
_{2 - Before exceeding the 1-year period of visa-free stay, citizens of U.S. must leave and stay abroad for 90 days before re-entering Albania.}

==== Substitute visa ====
Holders of a valid and previously used multiple-entry "C" visa issued by any Schengen Area member state may enter Albania without a visa for 90 days.

Holders of a valid and previously used multiple-entry "D" visa issued by any Schengen Area member state may enter Albania without a visa for up to 90 days within any 180-day period.

Holders of a valid and previously used multiple-entry visa issued by the United States may enter Albania without a visa for 90 days.

Holders of a residence permit issued by any Schengen Area member state, Cyprus, Ireland, the United Kingdom or the United States may enter Albania without a visa for up to 90 days within any 180-day period. They may apply to extend their stay on arrival.

Visa must have been used at least once before arrival to Albania. The visa exemption also applies to valid Green Card holders, holders of residence permits issued by any Schengen Area member state, or holders of refugee and stateless travel documents issued by any European Union member state or EFTA member state. There are some more visa exemptions.)

=== Non-ordinary passports ===
Holders of diplomatic, official or service passports issued by following countries may enter Albania without a visa:

- Algeria
- Cuba
- Ecuador
- Egypt
- Brazil
- India
- Indonesia
- Jordan
- Kyrgyzstan
- Mongolia
- Morocco
- Philippines
- Russia
- Saudi Arabia
- South Africa
- Thailand
- Tunisia^{D}
- Uzbekistan
- Vietnam

_{D - Diplomatic passports only.}

=== Future changes ===
Albania has signed visa exemption agreements with the following countries, but they have not yet entered into force:

Country	Passports	Agreement signed on
Dominican Republic	Diplomatic, official, special	September 2025

== Electronic visa (e-Visa) ==
Citizens of other countries may obtain an e-Visa. Processing times may take up to a few weeks. In addition to official government procedures, practical guidance for foreigners often highlights that long-term stays in Albania typically require a Type D visa followed by a residence or “unique permit,” depending on the purpose of stay such as employment, study, or remote work.

These processes usually involve online applications, submission of supporting documents, and registration steps after arrival, reflecting the country’s increasingly digital approach to immigration and residency management.

== See also ==
- Visa requirements for Albanian citizens
- Visa policy of the Schengen Area
