= Albanian nationality law =

Nationality law

Parliament of Albania
- Long title: On citizenship
- Citation: no. 113/2020
- Passed by: Parliament of Albania
- Passed: 2020-07-29
- Voting summary: 84 voted for; 8 voted against; 3 abstained

Amended by
- no. 77/2023
- Status: Amended

Albanian nationality law defines how citizenship in Albania is obtained and lost. It is based on a mixture of the principles of jus sanguinis and jus soli; both place of birth and Albanian parentage are relevant for determining whether a person is an Albanian citizen.

In some circumstances, citizenship is granted to children born in Albania to non-Albanian parents. This is not the case where parents are temporary or short-term visitors. Following recommendations from the United Nations and Council of Europe, all efforts are made in order to avoid statelessness.

Citizenship in Albania is regulated by law no. 113/2020, as amended, "On citizenship".

== Birth in Albania ==
A person born in Albania to non-Albanian parents is an Albanian citizen if that person:

- Holds no other nationality at the time of birth (i.e., is stateless)
- Parents reside in Albania and consent to the acquisition of citizenship
- Is adopted while a minor by an Albanian citizen residing in Albania

Effectively this means that:

- The children of resident immigrants can acquire Albanian citizenship
- Foundlings acquire citizenship automatically

Furthermore, if parents of a foundling become identified, citizenship right remains, unless parents request otherwise before the 14th birthday.

== Birth to an Albanian parent ==
Access to Albanian citizenship by birth is automatic if:

- Born in Albania and one parent is Albanian
- One parent is Albanian and the other is stateless or of unknown status; regardless of birthplace
- Born to two Albanian citizens, regardless of birthplace

One Albanian parent is sufficient condition for the right to immediate citizenship, upon request, regardless of birthplace.

== Naturalisation ==
A person may be naturalized as an Albanian citizen if he fulfills the following criteria:

- Over 18 years old
- Shelter and the means of sustaining himself
- Has not been convicted to sentences of three or more years in prison (except for political sentences)
- Basic knowledge of the Albanian language
- Does not endanger the security of the Republic of Albania
- Continuous residence in Albania for five years

This period can be reduced to:

- Three years, if Albanian ancestry can be proved to a second degree (at least one Albanian grandparent)
- One year, if been married for three years to an Albanian citizen

If Albania has an economic, cultural or scientific interest, an adult as a foreigner can be granted immediate citizenship, provided (s)he does not pose any public threat. The only requirement for stateless applicants is the five-year residence requirement and not posing a threat to the Republic of Albania. Unemancipated minors obtain Albanian citizenship automatically at the same time a parent is naturalized. For minors above 14 years of age, their consent is required.

== Albanian citizenship by adoption ==
Children adopted by Albanian citizens acquire Albanian citizenship. If only one of the foster parents is Albanian, both parents must agree. This is not necessary if the residence of the child will be in Albania, or the other parent is stateless.

== Loss of citizenship ==
It is possible to lose Albanian citizenship in the following circumstances

=== Renunciation ===
An Albanian citizen aged 18 and over may renounce Albanian citizenship, provided:

- (s)he does not remain stateless
- (s)he does not reside in Albania
- (s)he does not have pending civilian trials or penal proceedings

=== Children ===
If both parents renounce Albanian citizenship and request the same for their child. Children under the age of 18 also lose Albanian citizenship if adopted by a foreigners, and the child acquires another nationality upon adoption.

=== Deprivation of Albanian citizenship ===
Albanian citizenship can be withdrawn if a person has acquired it submitting intentionally false documentation. Albanian citizenship is also withdrawn to children aged less than 18, of said parents, provided they do not remain stateless.

== Resumption of Albanian citizenship ==
A person who has renounced his/her Albanian citizenship in order to obtain another one may resume it if he fails to obtain the new one. A former citizen who wishes to resume Albanian citizenship, applies for naturalisation.

== Dual citizenship ==
Albanian law permits all Albanian nationals to obtain any other nationality without losing their Albanian nationality (unless the law about the other newly acquired citizenship or nationality requires it).

== Visa requirements ==
Visa requirements for Albanian citizens

As of October 13th, 2020, Albanian citizens had visa-free or visa on arrival access to 114 countries and territories, ranking the Albanian passport 51st in the world according to the C.I.A. There are 82 other countries which require an eVisa or Visa-On-Arrival.
