= IDEMIA =

Multinational technology company

Idemia
- Type: SAS
- Industry: Security, Identity management, Criminal justice, Border control, Banking, Telecoms, Access control, Public safety, Smart card
- Headquarters: Courbevoie, Île-de-France, France
- Key people: Pierre Barrial (CEO)
- Products: Automated Fingerprint Identification Systems, Facial recognition system, Iris recognition, Finger vein recognition, Biometric terminals, e-gates, ID cards, ePassports, payment card, SIM cards, Biometric Card Readers Speed cameras
- Revenue: €2,9 billion (2023)
- Number of employees: 15,000
- Parent: Advent International
- Website: idemia.com

Idemia (styled as IDEMIA; formerly known as OT-Morpho) is a French multinational technical company headquartered in Courbevoie, France. It provides identity-related security services, and sells facial recognition and other biometric identification products and software to private companies and governments.

== Corporate history ==
=== Morpho ===
Morpho Systèmes was created in 1982, then absorbed by Sagem in 1993. In 2005, when Safran was created, Sagem became Sagem Défense Sécurité and in 2007, a separate company, Sagem Sécurité was created. It was renamed Morpho in 2010 (the name was derived from Morpho Systems S.A., a 1980s fingerprint identification firm), then Safran Identity & Security in 2016.

Morpho acquired several companies through its constitution. In 2005, Sagem Défense Sécurité acquired ORGA Kartensysteme GmbH which would be renamed Sagem Orga. In 2009, Safran acquired 81% of GE Homeland Protection, a wholly owned affiliate of the General Electric Company (NYSE:GE). On July 26, 2011 Safran completed the acquisition of L-1 Identity Solutions. Today, it is mainly part of MorphoTrust USA Inc. The company itself dates back over 50 years, from the time the first photo was added to a U.S. driver's license. In December 2015 Morpho (Safran) announced its acquisition of AirTag.

In the 2020 report Out of Control Amnesty International criticized Morpho for supplying "facial recognition equipment directly to the Shanghai Public Security Bureau in 2015."

=== Oberthur Technologies ===
In 2007, the activities of Oberthur Card Systems, Oberthur Fiduciaire and Oberthur Cash Protection, companies initially originating from Imprimerie Oberthur, founded in 1842 in Rennes by François-Charles Oberthür, were merged into a single entity, Oberthur Technologies.

In September 2016, Safran announced that it had entered into exclusive negotiations with Advent International, the owner of Oberthur Technologies since 2011, to sell its identity and security activities and the transaction was finalized on 31 May 2017. Oberthur Technologies (OT) and Safran Identity & Security (Morpho) were joining forces to create OT-Morpho, then renamed as Idemia on September 28.

=== Idemia (2017–present) ===
The new company is specialized in biometric identification and security, as well as secure payments with the aim of converging technologies developed for the public sector (by the former Morpho) and those for the private sector (by Oberthur Technologies).

On 15 October 2018, Yann Delabrière replaced Didier Lamouche as President & CEO.

On 1 July 2020, Pierre Barrial was appointed as President & Chief Executive Officer of the Group; Yann Delabrière returned to his role as chairman of the board with effect from July 1, 2020.

Idemia has developed biometric bank cards where the PIN code is replaced by the user's fingerprint. Fingerprint technology is currently being tested internally by banking institutions and would make it possible to secure contactless payment from the first euro. Fingerprint verification is done directly on the card and no fingerprint-related elements are transmitted to the merchant nor the bank.

In response to the growing demand from companies to use contactless access control devices to guarantee both a secure and hygienic method of identity verification, IDEMIA offers biometric terminals that use facial recognition or enable fingerprint recognition.

In July 2025, the company announces the launch of a library of 68 classical and post-quantum cryptographic algorithms.

== Products ==
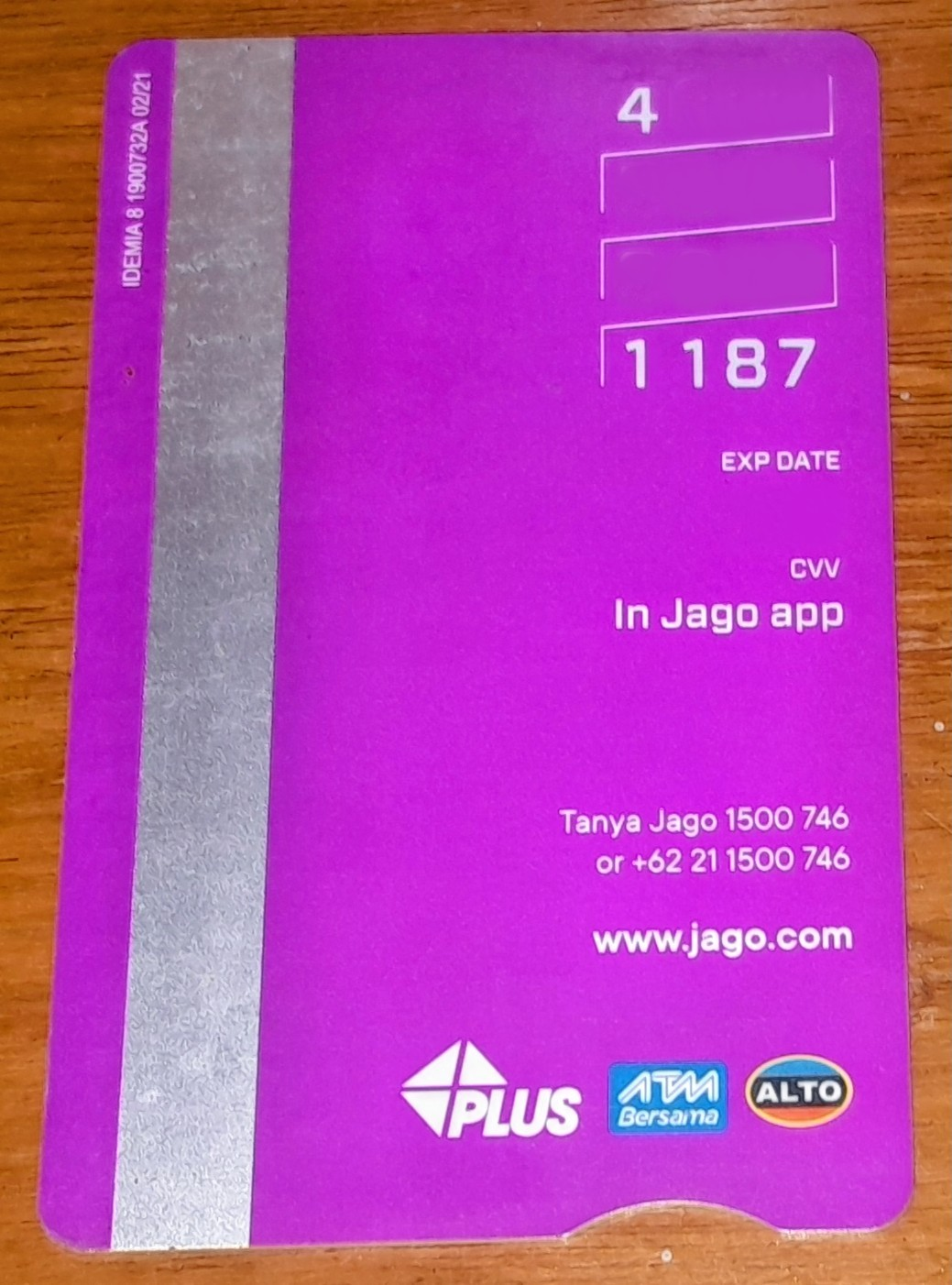
Example of a Visa Debit card with IDEMIA chip

=== Identification ===
This represents the company's historical core business. It develops the latest technologies in the field of biometrics.

The facial recognition technologies proposed by IDEMIA allow for smooth passage through the airport or stadium entrances and are also used to spot people banned from the stadium, identify fugitives in crowds or check the identity of people entering reserved areas. The company has many references in the police field or in the civil field: United States, United Arab Emirates, Albania, or India with the Aadhaar project whose objective is to provide a unique 12-digit number to each Indian citizen after enrolment of their biometric data (iris, fingerprints, portrait for 1.3 billion people) allowing these citizens to open a bank account, access microcredit or receive social benefits.

IDEMIA produced 3 billion identity documents (passports, identity cards, driving licences, etc.) worldwide in 2020.

=== Border Management ===
Morpho was a specialist in airport border solutions, these solutions are now carried by IDEMIA. Based on biometrics (fingerprints, facial recognition or iris recognition), the company offers semi-automated or automated solutions that enable a person's biometrics to be associated with that of his or her identity document, such as the ID2Travel solution.

Singapore's Changi Airport has implemented biometric services provided by IDEMIA to identify and authenticate travelers as they pass through Terminals 3 and 4 of the airport. In Singapore, these services also equip Seletar airport and are also being adapted for other markets in the Asia-Pacific region.

=== Banking ===
IDEMIA develops solutions to improve the payment card. Thus the company carries out research such as the implementation of fingerprint recognition in the 0.8 millimeter thickness of a card or the dynamic change the visual cryptogram. In addition, the company is able to manufacture custom cards in small series adapted to each of its customers, including cards made with recycled plastic.

== Operations in the United States ==
IDEMIA provides products to various federal and state government entities in the United States and is the leading provider in the issuance of driver's licences.

IDEMIA owns IdentoGO, a company that operates hundreds of storefronts in the United States which offer "state-of-the-art electronic fingerprint capture capabilities as well as other identity-related products and services." IdentoGO is an authorized service provider for the United States federal government, and as such provides identity verification services for multiple Transportation Security Administration programs, including TSA PreCheck and the Transportation Worker Identification Credential.

IDEMIA's facial analysis technology has also been used by various entities across the United States:

- In Florida, the Pinellas County Sheriff's Office has been using IDEMIA's software in their Face Analysis Comparison & Examination System (FACES) since 2001.
- In Massachusetts, the Registry of Motor Vehicles has been using IDEMIA's face recognition technology to run scans against the database of driver's license photos since 2006.
- In Arizona, the Department of Transportation implemented a mobile identification app with IDEMIA in 2021.

== Controversies ==
=== Sharing sensitive biometric data ===
Various civil rights organizations have criticized the government's contracts with IDEMIA, expressing concerns about sharing sensitive biometric data with a private and unregulated third-party company. Researchers have also found that facial verification and identification algorithms, including IDEMIA's algorithm specifically, exhibit systematic racial and gender bias. However, in April 2020 the NIST (National Institute of Standards and Technology), now part of the U.S. Department of Commerce, that provides technology, measurement, and standards that impact a wide range of products and technology, ranked IDEMIA 1st for iris recognition underlining its algorithms performance and accuracy.

=== Bribery in Nigeria ===
In 2012, Safran (Sagem) was fined €500,000 by a French court for bribing public officials in Nigeria to win a €170 million contract in 2000/03 to produce identity cards.

=== Hiding Russian government-affiliated code from the FBI ===
In 2017, Morpho drew controversy for incorporating code from a Russian government-affiliated firm in fingerprint-analysis software and hiding it from the Federal Bureau of Investigation. A whistleblower lawsuit was filed in U.S. federal court over the incident.

=== Contributions to state repression in Egypt ===
In 2018, a group of international, French, and Egyptian non-governmental organizations accused IDEMIA of profiting from Egypt's military crackdowns on dissent and providing surveillance technology to Egypt's authoritarian government under Abdel Fattah el-Sisi.

=== Facilitating abuse of refugees and migrants ===
In 2022, IDEMIA, alongside Thales Group, was accused of facilitating human rights abuses of refugees and migrants through their supply of border surveillance solutions.

=== Nepal passports ===
IDEMIA was allegedly favoured in the Nepalese passport procurement process.

=== South Africa contract ===
Idemia and the government of South Africa have been part of a controversy, with how Idemia was awarded a contract for biometric surveillance technology at airports.

=== New Jersey non-citizen voter registration ===
Idemia's software allowed 6,600 non-citizens to register to vote in U.S. elections.
