= Foreign relations of Albania =

The foreign relations of Albania are its relations with other governments and peoples. Foreign relations are conducted through the Ministry of Foreign Affairs in Tirana. The current minister is Elisa Spiropali. The current ambassador to the United Nations is Suela Janina.

Albania is a sovereign country in Southern Europe and the Mediterranean that declared its independence on 28 November 1912. Its foreign policy has maintained a policy of complementarianism by trying to have friendly relations with all countries. Since the collapse of Communism in 1990, Albania has extended its responsibilities and position in European and international affairs, supporting and establishing friendly relations with other nations around the world.

The main factors defining Albanian foreign policy consist of geopolitical location, population, economic crisis, and ties with Albanian diaspora throughout the world. It also maintains strong diplomatic relations with the EU (primarily Greece, Croatia, France, Germany, Italy) Balkan countries (primarily Kosovo, Turkey, and North Macedonia), Arab world, Canada, China, Israel, India, Japan, South Korea, Switzerland, UK and the United States.

The main objectives of the Albanian foreign policy are the accession of Albania to the European Union, the international recognition of Kosovo, the recognition of expulsion of Cham Albanians, helping and protecting the rights of Albanians in Montenegro, North Macedonia, Greece, Serbia, Italy, and the Albanian diaspora.

Albania was voted to become a member of the 15-country United Nations Security Council for a two-year term, 2022–23.

== Overview ==
The government of Albania was concerned with the developments in neighboring Kosovo, particularly in the post-Dayton agreement period. During the Kosovo War in 1999 as well as the ethnic cleansing of Kosovo Albanians by Serbs alongside the subsequent refugee influx into the country, Albania's status as an ally of the United States was confirmed. Albania emerged as being generally supportive of the United States. The support for the United States has remained high at 95% in Muslim majority (56% of the population) Albania in contrast to the rest of the Islamic world.

== Balkans/Albania ==
=== Turkey ===
During the post-cold war, geo-political complexities and conflicts in the Balkans, made Albania seek a protector power with Turkey, which is a NATO member. During the 1990s, state relations between Albania and Turkey were marked by high level visits, military agreements and the deployment of Turkish soldiers. An Albanian-Turkish military cooperation agreement was signed on 29 July 1992. The military agreement entailed education and training of personnel, bilateral cooperation in weapons production, joint military exercises, the exchange of military delegations and joint commissions on expanding further military ties into the future. The agreement also encompassed rebuilding Albania's Pasha Liman Base in the Bay of Vlorë on the Ionian Sea by Turkey, in return for granting Turkey's access and use. Turkey has trained the Albanian Armed Forces, in particular officers and commando units. During civil war in 1997, Turkey alongside other countries, participated in Operation Alba by providing a brigade of 800 Turkish troops to restore order and its involvement served mainly as a stabilising force.

Turkey considers its friendship with Albania as important due to the context of state relations with Greece and through policy have exploited difficulties arising in Albanian-Greek relations. Having a powerful ally in Turkey has suited Albania at times regarding difficult interstate relations with Greece. Albania's emergence in the Balkans as a key NATO partner contributed to good and stronger Albanian-Turkish relations, in particular relating to military matters. The military alliance during the 1990s between Turkey and Albania was also aimed against Serbia in case a war over Kosovo had a wider regional spread. Greece has expressed concerns regarding Turkish relations with Albania and interpreted them as an anti-Greek measure to isolate Greece within the wider context of Albania being a potential outlet for expanding Muslim influence and Turkey allying with Muslim populations in the Balkans. Turkey on the other hand claimed Greece increased tensions within the region and conveyed concerns relating to Albanian and Greek polemics with Ankara expressing a partial bias on Albania's side angering the Greeks. Greece, aware of Albanian-Turkish military agreements denounced Turkey's interference in Greek affairs. Though not officially considered in Turkey as a rival within Albania, during the unrest of 1997 Greece was able to become an influential actor in Albania and the early period of the Kosovo crisis (1998-1999) when Albanian officials looked to Greece for assistance. The resumption of closer Albanian-Turkish relations ensured during the Kosovo crisis that made both countries act along the same policy lines toward Slobodan Milošević and the issue of Greater Serbia.

Turkey supported Albania's membership to become part of NATO. Military cooperation between Albania and Turkey is viewed by NATO as a stabilising factor within the volatile region of the Balkans. Albania has come to depend heavily on Turkish assistance and a high amount of military security. Turkey remains for Albania an important military ally alongside the U.S. Through its military personnel Turkey continues to train Albanian armed forces and also to provide assistance in logistics and modernisation efforts of the Albanian military. Radar systems for the surveillance of Albanian airspace in addition to telecommunication equipment have been supplied by Turkey to Albania. Albania receives Turkish assistance for police training. Turkey has continuously supported Albania from the 1990s on EU related matters as both countries view EU membership as an eventual final goal and common objective. State relations of Albania with Turkey are friendly and close, due to maintenance of close links with the Albanian diaspora in Turkey and strong Turkish sociopolitical, cultural, economic and military ties with Albania. Turkey has been supportive of Albanian geopolitical interests within the Balkans. In Gallup polls conducted in recent times Turkey is viewed as a friendly country by 73% of people in Albania. Albania has established political and economic ties with Arab countries, in particular with Arab Persian Gulf states who have heavily invested in religious, transport and other infrastructure alongside other facets of the economy in addition to the somewhat limited societal links they share. Albania is also working to develop social-political and economic ties with Israel.

=== Greece ===
After the fall of the Albanian communist regime in 1991, relations between Greece and Albania became increasingly strained because of widespread allegations of mistreatment by Albanian authorities of the Greek ethnic minority in southern Albania and of mistreatment the Albanian communities in northern Greece. A wave of Albanian illegal economic migrants to Greece exacerbated tensions. The crisis in Greek–Albanian relations reached its peak in late August 1994, when an Albanian court sentenced five members (a sixth member was added later) of the ethnic Greek political party Omonia to prison terms on charges of undermining the Albanian state. Greece responded by freezing all EU aid to Albania, and sealing its border with Albania. In December 1994, however, Greece began to permit limited EU aid to Albania, while Albania released two of the Omonia defendants and reduced the sentences of the remaining four.

There are still other impending issues in the relations between the two countries, regarding many Albanian workers in Greece who have not received legal papers despite promises by the Greek government. In 1996, the two countries signed a Treaty of Peace and Friendship and discussed the issues of the status of Albanian refugees in Greece and education in the mother tongue for the ethnic Greek minority in southern Albania. In the 1990s, Greece preferred and assisted Fatos Nano as Albanian leader due to him being Orthodox over Sali Berisha a Muslim, as Nano was seen as being friendlier to Greek interests. The government of Fatos Nano was viewed by Turkey as having a pro-Greek orientation and expressed some dissatisfaction though during that time still maintained close military relations with Albania in rebuilding its armed forces and a military base.

Today, as result of very frequent high-level contacts between the governments and the parliaments, relations between the two countries are regarded as excellent. Greece is a staunch supporter of the Euro-Atlantic integration of the Republic of Albania. Since Albania's NATO entry in May 2009, Albanian-Greek relations have been developing on all fronts, and especially after the election victory of Edi Rama in 2013, with the Albanian Chief of Foreign Policy, Ralf Gjoni, describing the diplomatic relations between two countries as "excellent". Greece today is Albania's most important European Union ally and NATO partner. At the Albanian government's request, about 250 Greek military personnel are stationed in Albania to assist with the training and restructuring of the Albanian Armed Forces, as part of the NATO programme. Big projects currently in running between the two countries include the touristic development of the Ionian coastline shared between the two countries, and the Trans Adriatic Pipeline (TAP), which helped boosting the relations of the two countries even further.

Albania's ties with Greece are also based on cultural and historic relations of the two peoples, including migration and national minorities. In addition, since Albania's transition to democracy, Greece has become a major financial partner of the country with Albania's economy being heavily reliant on investments from Greece. Culturally, the two nations' populations, whilst having a tense history, share numerous cultural and historic traits that have been used to boost the political relations of the neighbouring countries.

There had been numerous discussions, research and attempts by Albanians and Greeks to form a confederation during the Ottoman period. In the 19th century there were plans to create a Greek-Albanian confederation, which was revived from the earlier 18th century plans. In 1907 a special protocol and memorandum of understanding was signed by Neoklis Kazazis and Ismail Qemali, the first prime minister of Albania. Furthermore, Arvanite author Aristides Kollias in his book "The proclamation of the Association of Arvanites" states "from 1881 to 1907 we have sustained efforts and repeated consultations between Greeks and Albanians to create a Greek-Albanian state." In addition, Thanos Paleologos-Anagnostopoulos in his book "Greece and Albania in the early 20th century (1995)" stated that Ismail Qemali, a philhellene, worked with numerous Greek politicians and lobbyists, including Arvanite leaders, on a possible Greek-Albanian federation, one that "maintains national and religious independence of the two peoples." Likewise, Neoklis Kazazis saw this as a way of Greece quashing Italian influence in the region.

== International ==
Albania was voted to become a member of the 15-country UN Security Council for a two-year term, in 2022–23, on 11 June 2021. Former ambassador Kadare said that Albania's priorities in the Security Council will include a focus on women, peace, and security, promoting human rights and international law, preventing conflicts, protecting civilians, countering violent extremism, addressing climate change and its links to security, and strengthening multilateralism and the rules-based international order. She tweeted thanks to all countries that: "entrusted us with this huge responsibility".

Disputes

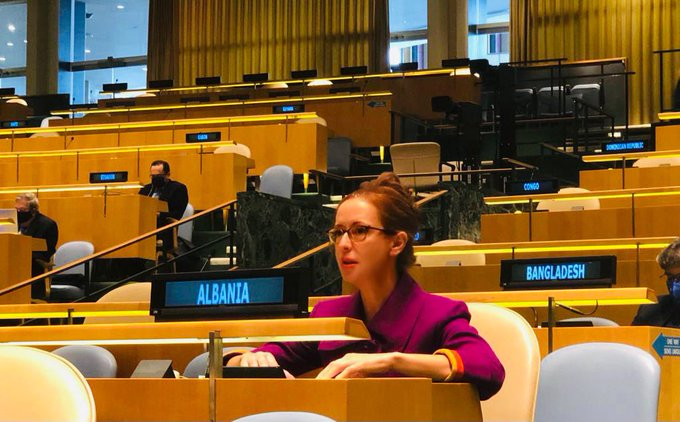
Former ambassador to the United Nations Besiana Kadare

The Albanian government supports the protection of the rights of ethnic Albanians outside of its borders but has downplayed them to further its primary foreign policy goal of regional cooperation; Albanian majority in Kosovo seeks full recognition of the declared independence from Serbia; Albanians in the Republic of Macedonia claim discrimination in education, access to public-sector jobs, and representation in government. A handful of Albanian troops have participated in the U.S.-led military operations in Iraq and Afghanistan. Albanian policy is very favorable to that of the United States and European Union.

The $30 million Albanian-American Enterprise Fund (AAEF), launched in 1994, is actively making debt and equity investments in local businesses. AAEF is designed to harness private sector efforts to assist in the economic transformation. U.S. assistance priorities include promotion of agricultural development and a market economy, advancement of democratic institutions (including police training), and improvements in quality of life.

International conflicts

In response to the Russian invasion of Ukraine in 2022, Albania has expressed support for Ukraine and also supported Latvia's nomination to join the United Nations Security Council in 2025.

== List of countries ==
List of countries which Albania maintains diplomatic relations with:

#	Country	Date
1	Romania	28 December 1913
2	Italy	21 February 1914
3	Serbia	25 April 1914
4	Bulgaria	April 1914
5	United Kingdom	9 November 1921
6	Austria	18 February 1922
7	Japan	18 April 1922
8	Hungary	23 May 1922
9	France	16 June 1922
10	Czech Republic	5 July 1922
11	United States	4 December 1922
12	Greece	4 January 1923
13	Turkey	15 December 1923
14	Russia	4 July 1924
15	Uruguay	23 April 1932
16	Poland	7 April 1937
17	North Korea	29 November 1948
18	Mongolia	24 March 1949
19	China	23 November 1949
20	Vietnam	11 February 1950
21	India	3 March 1956
22	Egypt	19 April 1956
23	Finland	8 June 1956
24	Sudan	February 1957
25	Ethiopia	26 June 1958
26	Iraq	14 August 1958
27	Guinea	October 1958
28	Somalia	September 1960
29	Cuba	15 December 1960
30	Brazil	4 April 1961
31	Ghana	11 August 1961
32	Morocco	11 February 1962
33	Cambodia	5 September 1962
34	Algeria	12 February 1963
35	Mali	9 February 1965
36	Pakistan	24 July 1965
37	Indonesia	18 August 1965
38	Mauritania	24 September 1965
39	Tanzania	May 1966
40	Republic of the Congo	23 June 1968
41	Kuwait	8 August 1968
42	Syria	27 May 1969
43	Sweden	20 June 1969
44	Zambia	9 July 1969
45	Libya	6 May 1970
46	Central African Republic	23 May 1970
47	Denmark	29 May 1970
48	Switzerland	20 July 1970
49	Belgium	13 November 1970
50	Netherlands	17 November 1970
—	Iran (severed)	24 May 1971
51	Norway	29 May 1971
52	Chile	10 September 1971
53	Peru	6 December 1971
54	Luxembourg	15 April 1972
55	Nepal	23 May 1972
56	Equatorial Guinea	30 November 1972
57	Costa Rica	20 February 1973
58	Malta	5 March 1973
59	Senegal	26 April 1973
60	Nigeria	22 May 1973
61	Cameroon	20 August 1973
62	Argentina	4 October 1973
63	Tunisia	8 October 1973
64	Burundi	7 November 1973
65	New Zealand	1973
66	Lebanon	28 May 1974
67	Benin	4 October 1974
68	Mexico	15 October 1974
69	Guinea-Bissau	15 November 1974
70	Gabon	16 November 1974
71	Laos	18 June 1975
72	Mozambique	25 June 1975
73	Venezuela	14 October 1975
74	Iceland	9 April 1976
75	Madagascar	28 April 1976
76	San Marino	21 June 1976
77	Sierra Leone	23 August 1976
78	Myanmar	15 December 1976
79	Burkina Faso	15 January 1977
80	Portugal	21 June 1977
81	Togo	25 June 1977
82	Bangladesh	10 August 1977
83	Mauritius	October 1977
84	Yemen	May 1978
85	Panama	20 August 1978
86	São Tomé and Príncipe	20 November 1979
87	Nicaragua	November 1979
88	Colombia	5 December 1979
89	Ecuador	31 January 1980
90	Sri Lanka	4 March 1980
91	Djibouti	2 April 1980
92	Zimbabwe	18 April 1980
93	Seychelles	16 May 1980
94	Niger	18 June 1980
95	Lesotho	June 1980
96	Cape Verde	6 August 1980
97	Malaysia	24 June 1981
98	Botswana	30 August 1982
99	Thailand	30 September 1982
100	Kenya	2 February 1983
101	Barbados	19 May 1983
102	Australia	16 September 1984
103	Ivory Coast	9 January 1985
104	Guyana	1 April 1985
105	Malawi	12 July 1985
106	Spain	12 September 1986
107	Singapore	20 November 1986
108	Jordan	18 May 1987
109	Philippines	11 June 1987
110	Bolivia	21 August 1987
111	Canada	10 September 1987
112	Germany	2 October 1987
113	Angola	17 August 1988
—	State of Palestine	26 October 1989
114	Namibia	2 August 1990
115	Israel	19 August 1991
116	South Korea	22 August 1991
117	Papua New Guinea	28 August 1991
118	Cyprus	29 August 1991
—	Holy See	7 September 1991
119	Kyrgyzstan	4 January 1992
120	Estonia	17 January 1992
121	Slovenia	10 March 1992
122	Lithuania	27 April 1992
123	Latvia	29 April 1992
124	United Arab Emirates	1 June 1992
125	Paraguay	29 July 1992
126	Croatia	25 August 1992
127	Qatar	26 August 1992
128	South Africa	20 November 1992
129	Saudi Arabia	2 December 1992
130	Oman	7 December 1992
131	Moldova	23 December 1992
132	Bosnia and Herzegovina	28 December 1992
133	Slovakia	1 January 1993
134	Ukraine	13 January 1993
135	Guatemala	29 January 1993
136	Armenia	18 February 1993
137	Liechtenstein	23 April 1993
138	Bahrain	10 May 1993
139	Belarus	17 May 1993
140	Georgia	8 July 1993
141	Kazakhstan	21 September 1993
142	Azerbaijan	23 September 1993
143	Uzbekistan	23 November 1993
144	Tajikistan	22 December 1993
145	North Macedonia	24 December 1993
146	Brunei	27 January 1994
147	Turkmenistan	24 March 1994
—	Sovereign Order of Malta	14 July 1994
148	Ireland	January 1995
149	Andorra	15 February 1996
150	Jamaica	3 April 1996
151	Dominican Republic	27 May 2002
152	El Salvador	25 July 2003
153	Montenegro	1 August 2006
154	Afghanistan	16 August 2006
—	Kosovo	18 February 2008
155	Maldives	25 June 2008
156	Samoa	1 August 2008
157	Fiji	23 June 2010
158	Saint Lucia	14 July 2010
159	Honduras	2 September 2010
160	Nauru	20 April 2011
161	Solomon Islands	19 May 2011
162	Tuvalu	1 June 2011
163	Monaco	24 November 2011
164	Trinidad and Tobago	13 May 2014
165	Saint Kitts and Nevis	31 October 2018
166	Dominica	20 March 2025

In 2008 and 2009, the Albanian Parliament ordered the Foreign Ministry to establish diplomatic relations with countries which Albania did not maintain diplomatic relations with, namely Antigua and Barbuda, Bahamas, Belize, Chad, Comoros, Democratic Republic of the Congo, Dominica, East Timor, Eswatini, Federated States of Micronesia, Fiji, Gambia, Grenada, Kiribati, Liberia, Marshall Islands, Palau, Saint Kitts and Nevis, Saint Lucia, Saint Vincent and the Grenadines, Samoa, Solomon Islands, Suriname, Rwanda, Tonga, Trinidad and Tobago, Tuvalu, Uganda and Vanuatu.

Diplomatic relations were suspended with Iran on 7 September 2022.

== Organizations ==
Albania is member in these international organizations:

AC, APF, BIE, BSEC, CEB, CoBx, CoE, CERN (Non-Member State), CEI, CCC, CEFTA, ECE, EAPC, EBRD, EITI, ECAA, ECAC, EC, ENTSO-E, Eurocontrol, FAO, FIUs, IAEA, IAO, IBRD, ICAO, ICCt, ICC, ICRC, ICRM, ICCROM, IDA, IDB, IHO, IFAD, IFC, IFRCS, ILO, IMF, IMO, Interpol, IOC, IPU, IOM, ISO, ITU, ITUC, MIGA, NATO, OAS, OB, OIC, OIF, OPCW, OSCE, OTIF, PCA, SEECP, SECI, SETC, UN, UNCTAD, UNDP, UNDSS, UNESCO, UNFPA, UNHCR, UNW, UNIDO, UNWTO, UPU, UfM, VC, WB, WCO, WFTU, WHO, WIPO, WMO and WTO.

== Diplomatic relations ==
=== Africa ===
Country	Formal Relations Began	Notes
Egypt	19 April 1956	See Albania–Egypt relations: Albania has an embassy in Cairo.; Egypt has an embassy in Tirana.
Libya	6 May 1970	See Albania–Libya relations Albania was one of the first countries to recognize the National Transitional Council on 18 July 2011 as the legitimate representative of the Libyan people.
Tunisia	8 October 1973	Both countries have a number of bilateral agreements.
Morocco	11 February 1962	Since the start of diplomatic relations, both countries have shown a willingness to collaborate, particularly in the field of trade. In January 2005, Albania revoked its 'de facto' recognition of the Sahrawi Arab Democratic Republic in favor of Morocco.

=== Americas ===
Country	Formal Relations Began	Notes
Brazil	4 April 1961	See Albania–Brazil relations: Albania has an embassy in Brasília.; Brazil has an embassy in Tirana.
Canada	10 September 1987	See Albania–Canada relations: Albania has an embassy in Ottawa.; Canada is accredited to Albania from its embassy in Rome, Italy and has an honorary consulate in Tirana.
Cuba	15 December 1960	In September 1964, Cuba and Albania signed a pact for scientific cooperation.; Albania is accredited to Cuba from its UN ambassador Besiana Kadare in New York.; Cuba is accredited to Albania from its embassy in Sofia, Bulgaria.
Mexico	15 October 1974	See Albania–Mexico relations Mexico recognized and established diplomatic relations with Albania on 15 October 1974. Shortly thereafter Mexico opened a resident embassy in Tirana, however the embassy was closed in 1979.: Albania is accredited to Mexico from its embassy in Washington, D.C., USA.; Mexico is accredited to Albania from its embassy in Rome, Italy and maintains an honorary consulate in Tirana.
United States	4 December 1922	See Albania–United States relations

=== Asia ===
Country	Formal Relations Began	Notes
Azerbaijan	23 September 1993	See Albania–Azerbaijan relations
China	23 November 1949	See Albania–China relations People's Socialist Republic of Albania under Enver Hoxha, moved an annual resolution in the General Assembly to transfer China's seat at the United Nations from the Republic of China to the People's Republic of China. On 25 October 1971, Resolution 2758, sponsored by Albania, was passed by the General Assembly, withdrawing recognition of the ROC as the legitimate government of China, and recognizing the PRC as the sole legitimate government of China. Albania was the first country to recognize the People's Republic China. Albania and People's Republic China established diplomatic relations on 23 November 1949.: Albania has an embassy in Beijing.; People's Republic China has an embassy in Tirana.; China–Albania Friendship Association
Cyprus	29 August 1991	Albania is represented in Cyprus by its embassy in Athens, Greece.; Cyprus is represented in Albania by its embassy in Athens, Greece.; Both countries have a number of bilateral agreements.
India	3 March 1956	See Albania–India relations
Iran	24 May 1971 (suspended)	See Albania–Iran relations: Iran had an embassy in Tirana which closed in 2022.
Israel	19 August 1991	See Albania–Israel relations: Albania has an embassy in Tel Aviv.; Israel has an embassy in Tirana.
Japan	18 April 1922	See Albania–Japan relations Albania and Japan resumed established diplomatic relations in March 1981.
Kuwait	8 August 1968	Albania has an embassy in Kuwait City.; Kuwait has an embassy in Tirana.
Malaysia	24 June 1981	Albania has an embassy in Kuala Lumpur.
North Korea	29 November 1948	See also: Albania–North Korea relations
Pakistan	24 July 1965	In December 2006, Albanian deputy foreign minister Anton Gurakqui visited Pakistan to hold bilateral consultation with Pakistani political leadership. Pakistan also offers training facilities to young Albanian bureaucrats in the field of banking, finance, management and diplomacy.
Palestine	26 October 1989	See Albania–Palestine relations
Turkey	15 December 1923	See Albania–Turkey relations

=== Europe ===
Country	Formal Relations Began	Notes
Austria	18 February 1922	See Albania–Austria relations
Belgium	13 November 1970	See Albania–Belgium relations
Bulgaria	April 1914	See Albania–Bulgaria relations: Albania has an embassy in Sofia and a consulate in Plovdiv.; Bulgaria has an embassy in Tirana and a consulate in Vlorë.
Croatia	25 August 1992	See Albania–Croatia relations
Czech Republic	5 July 1922	See Albania–Czech Republic relations The multi-national Communist armed forces' sole joint action was the Warsaw Pact invasion of Czechoslovakia in August 1968. All member countries, with the exception of the People's Republic of Albania and the Socialist Republic of Romania participated in the invasion. Albania formally withdrew form the Warsaw Pact in 1968 over the matter.
Denmark	1 May 1970	See Albania–Denmark relations: Albania has an embassy in Copenhagen.; Denmark has an embassy in Tirana.
Estonia	17 January 1992	See Albania–Estonia relations
France	16 June 1922	See Albania–France relations
Germany	2 October 1987	See Albania–Germany relations
Greece	4 January 1923	See Albania–Greece relations: Greece is Albania's most important European Union ally and partner.; Relations since the election victory of Edi Rama in 2013 have seen massive improvement and warming of relations between the two nations.; Many organisations both political and societal exist in Albania and Greece promoting relations between the two nations.; As of 2014 both nations have described their relations as 'excellent' and Albania considered Greece one of its 'strongest and most important allies', both NATO nations have close relations nowadays.
Holy See	7 September 1991	See Albania–Holy See relations: Albania has an embassy to the Holy See in Rome.; Holy See has a resident nunciature (embassy) in Tirana.; Pope Francis visited Albania on 21 September, which the first nation in Europe he visited.
Hungary	23 May 1922	See Albania–Hungary relations
Iceland	9 April 1976	See Albania–Iceland relations: Albania is accredited to Iceland from its embassy in Stockholm, Sweden.; Iceland is accredited to Albania from its embassy in Stockholm, Sweden.
Ireland	January 1995	See Albania–Ireland relations: Albania is accredited to Ireland from its embassy in London, United Kingdom.; Ireland is accredited to Albania from its embassy in Athens, Greece.
Italy	21 February 1914	See Albania–Italy relations: On 14 January 2011, Albania signed a pact with Italy for a corporal foreign strategy.
Kosovo	18 February 2008	See Albania–Kosovo relations
Latvia	29 April 1992	See Albania–Latvia relations: Both countries established diplomatic relations in 1928 and were restored in 1992.; Albania is represented in Latvia by its embassy in Warsaw, Poland.; Latvia is represented in Albania by its embassy in Rome, Italy and an honorary consulate in Tirana.; Both countries have a number of bilateral agreements.
Lithuania	27 April 1992	See Albania–Lithuania relations
Montenegro	1 August 2006	See Albania–Montenegro relations
Netherlands	17 November 1970	See Albania–Netherlands relations
North Macedonia	24 December 1993	See Albania–North Macedonia relations
Poland	7 April 1937	See Albania–Poland relations
Portugal	21 June 1977	See Albania–Portugal relations
Romania	28 December 1913	See Albania–Romania relations
Russia	4 July 1924	See Albania–Russia relations
Serbia	25 April 1914	See Albania-Serbia relations
Slovakia	1 January 1993	See Albania–Slovakia relations
Slovenia	10 March 1992	See Albania–Slovenia relations
Spain	12 September 1986	See Albania–Spain relations
Ukraine	13 January 1993	See Albania–Ukraine relations: Ukraine has an embassy in Tirana
United Kingdom	9 November 1921	See Albania–United Kingdom relations: Albania maintains an embassy in London.; The United Kingdom is accredited to Albania through its embassy in Tirana.; Both countries share common membership of the Council of Europe, European Court of Human Rights, the International Criminal Court, NATO, OSCE, and the World Trade Organization. Bilaterally the two countries have a Double Taxation Agreement, an Investment Agreement, a Partnership, Trade and Cooperation Agreement, a Readmission Agreement, and an Agreement on the Transfer of Sentenced Persons.

=== Oceania ===
Country	Formal Relations Began	Notes
Australia	16 September 1984	See Albania–Australia relations

== Multilateral ==
Organisation	Formal Relations Began	Notes
European Union	20 June 1991	See Accession of Albania to the European Union Albania applied in 2009 to join and became an official candidate in June 2014. The Commission recommended the launch of negotiations on 9 November 2016. In 2020 EU ministers agree to start accession talks, on 19 July 2022 Albania starts accession talks and holds the first Intergovernmental Conference on accession negotiations.
NATO	1992	See Albania–NATO relations At the 2008 Bucharest summit, NATO invited Albania to join the alliance. In April 2009 Albania became a full member of NATO, which remains popular in the country especially due to its intervention in the Kosovo war on behalf of ethnic Albanians. Within the Balkans, Albania is considered to be the most pro-European and pro-Western country in the region and unlike its neighbours, except Kosovo, it has negligible support for Russia.
United Nations	14 December 1955	See Albania and the United Nations

== See also ==
- List of diplomatic missions in Albania
- List of diplomatic missions of Albania
- Visa requirements for Albanian citizens
