= De Negri =

De Negri is an Italian surname. Notable people with the surname include:

- Giovanni Battista De Negri, (1851–1924) Italian tenor
- Mario De Negri (1901–1978), Italian sprinter
- Pierpaolo De Negri (born 1986), Italian cyclist
- De Negri family, Dutch noble family emigrated from Italy
- Manuel Y. de Negri, Mexican diplomat.
