= List of ambassadors of Mexico to Italy =

Ambassador of Mexico to Italy
- Flag of Mexico
- Incumbent; Carlos Eugenio Garcia de Alba Zepeda since 15 February 2021
- Nominator: President of Mexico

The ambassador of Mexico to Italy (Spanish:Embajador de México ante Italia) is the highest ranking diplomatic representative of the United Mexican States to Italy. It is currently concurrently accredited to Albania, San Marino, Malta, and the Food and Agriculture Organization, which is based in Rome. It is based out of the Mexican Embassy in Rome. The ambassador is appointed by the President of Mexico.

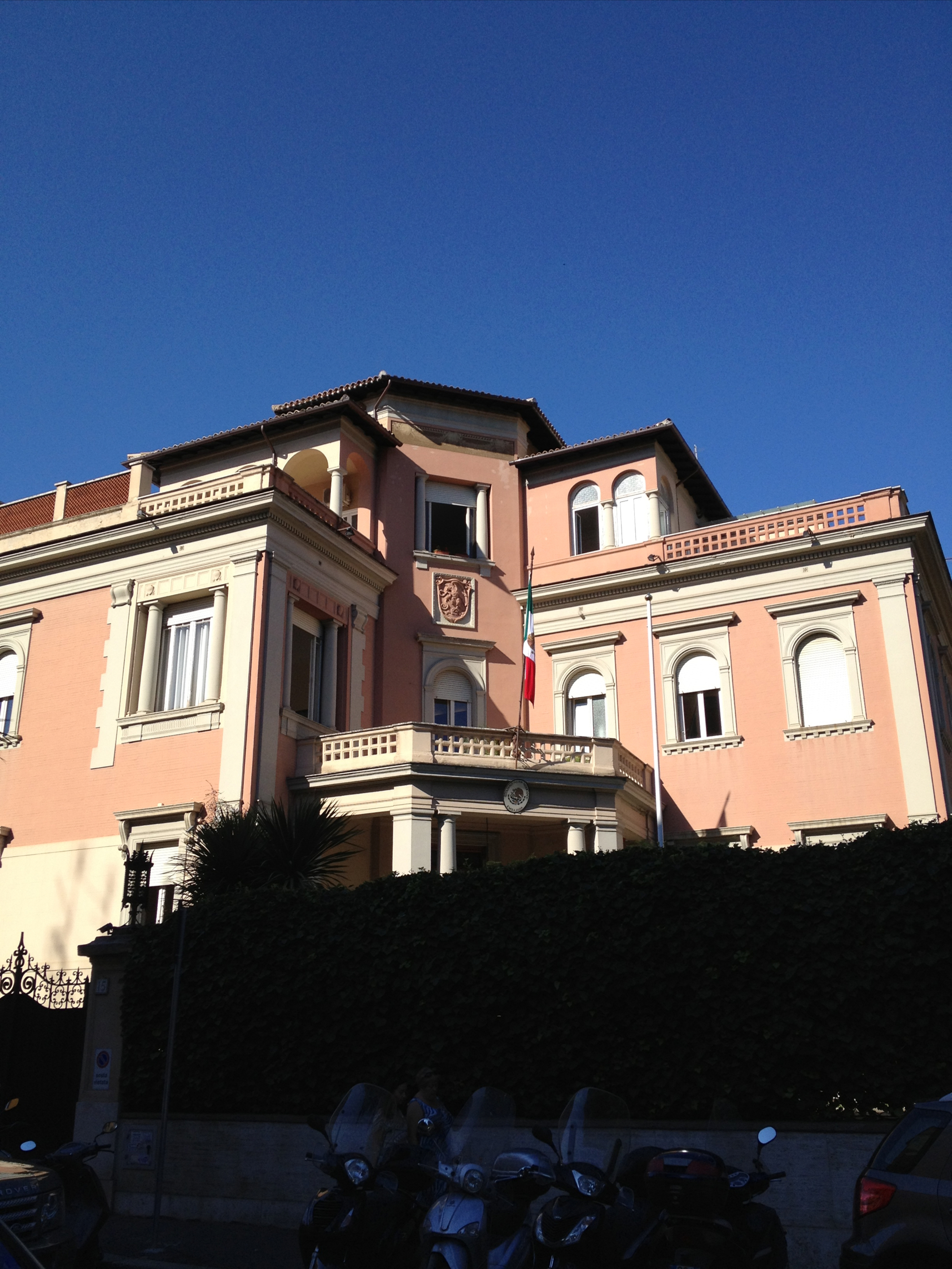
Embassy of Mexico, Rome

== History ==
In 1825, Mexico's first international ambassador post independence. Francisco Pablo Vázquez attempted to gain recognition from the Vatican City in the hopes it would drive recognition by European countries. In 1826, Colombia's ambassador to the Vatican, Ignacio Tejeda, was accredited to Mexico. In February 1827, Mexico attempted to start relations with multiple Italian kingdoms. On August 1, 1855, Mexico obtained relations with the Kingdom of Sardinia, which transferred to Italy after its unification in 1870. The relationship between the two modern states began on December 15, 1874, more than 150 years ago.

== List of diplomatic representatives ==
The following list should include every head of the legation recognized by Mexican Secretariat of Foreign Affairs.

Diplomatic representatives of Mexico to Italy
Name	Title	Appointment	Credentials Presented	End of mission	Mexican President
José de Jesús Castañeda	Chargé d'affaires	14 December 1874	16 December 1875	29 March 1878	Lerdo de Tejada
Emilio Velasco	Chargé d'affaires	27 October 1877	9 April 1878	16 December 1879	Porfirio Díaz
Juan Sánchez Azcona (father)	Resident minister	6 December 1879	20 April 1880	20 August 1888	Porfirio Díaz
Eduardo Garay	Resident minister	6 June 1888	24 October 1888	21 August 1889	Porfirio Díaz
Juan B. Hijar y Haro	Interim Chargé d'affaires	21 August 1889		24 December 1890	Porfirio Díaz
Manuel Díaz Mimiaga	Resident minister	11 September 1890	24 December 1890	22 April 1891	Porfirio Díaz
Juan B. Hijar y Haro	Interim Chargé d'affaires	22 April 1891		9 July 1892	Porfirio Díaz
Gonzalo A. Esteva	Resident minister	17 December 1891	5 July 1892	17 November 1898	Porfirio Díaz
Gonzalo A. Esteva	Envoy extraordinary and minister plenipotentiary	8 August 1898	17 November 1898	August 1914 (Note: Removed due to the Mexican Revolution. In his memoirs, Esteva y Landero maintains that he was in charge of the legation until February 1916, but official sources say August 1914.)	Porfirio Díaz
Gonzalo A. Esteva	Envoy extraordinary and minister plenipotentiary	16 March 1916	2 September 1916	17 April 1917	Victoriano Huerta
Juan Sánchez Azcona (son)	Personal agent	6 January 1914 (Note: Concurrently accredited to France, Spain, Great Britain, and Belgium.)		7 March 1916	Victoriano Huerta
Félix Fulgencio Palavicini	Personal agent	14 June 1920 (Note: Concurrently accredited to France, Spain, Great Britain, and Belgium.)		29 December 1920	Venustiano Carranza
Eduardo Hay	Envoy extraordinary and minister plenipotentiary	26 December 1918	17 March 1919	21 June 1923	Venustiano Carranza
Julio Madero	Envoy extraordinary and minister plenipotentiary	1 July 1923	18 November 1923	22 December 1924	Alvaro Obregon
Rafael Nieto Compeán	Envoy extraordinary and minister plenipotentiary	1 January 1925	29 January 1925	11 April 1926	Plutarco Elías Calles
Carlos J. Puig Casauranc	Envoy extraordinary and minister plenipotentiary	28 May 1926 (Note: Extended to Hungary on 18 April 1927, while remaining in Italy)	16 November 1926	1 January 1928	Plutarco Elías Calles
Manuel Y. de Negri	Interim Chargé d'affaires	31 December 1927		19 March 1929	Plutarco Elías Calles
Bernardo J. Gastélum	Envoy extraordinary and minister plenipotentiary	1 January 1929 (Note: Concurrently accredited to Hungary)	19 March 1929	1 March 1930	Emilio Portes Gil
Ezequiel Padilla Peñaloza	Envoy extraordinary and minister plenipotentiary	1 April 1930 (Note: Concurrently accredited to Hungary)	31 May 1930	22 April 1932	Pascual Ortiz Rubio
Manuel Y. de Negri	Envoy extraordinary and minister plenipotentiary	22 April 1932 (Note: Concurrently accredited to Hungary)	28 July 1932	1 May 1933	Pascual Ortiz Rubio
Manuel C. Téllez	Envoy extraordinary and minister plenipotentiary	1 May 1933 (Note: Concurrently accredited to Hungary)	30 July 1933	1 January 1935	Abelardo L. Rodríguez
Eduardo Vasconcelos	Envoy extraordinary and minister plenipotentiary	1 January 1935 (Note: Concurrently accredited to Hungary)	7 April 1935	27 November 1935	Lázaro Cárdenas
Leopoldo Ortiz Liebich	Envoy extraordinary and minister plenipotentiary	1 January 1936 (Note: Concurrently accredited to Hungary)	25 February 1936	22 September 1937	Lázaro Cárdenas
Gustavo F. Villatoro	Interim Chargé d'affaires	17 October 1937		1 June 1938	Lázaro Cárdenas
Manuel Maples Arce	Interim Chargé d'affaires	1 June 1938		24 December 1941	Lázaro Cárdenas
style="background:Gray;" Diplomatic relations were interrupted in December 1941 during World War II.
Mariano Armendáriz del Castillo	Ambassador Extraordinary and Plenipotentiary	1 July 1946	28 September 1946	16 March 1949	Manuel Ávila Camacho
Mario Garza Ramos	Interim Chargé d'affaires	20 May 1949		August 1950	Miguel Alemán Valdés
Carlos Darío Ojeda Rovira	Ambassador Extraordinary and Plenipotentiary	August 1950	Unknown	16 May 1953	Miguel Alemán Valdés
Ramón Beteta Quintana	Ambassador Extraordinary and Plenipotentiary	1 April 1953 (Note: Concurrently accredited to Greece while residing in Rome)	1 June 1953	11 February 1959	Adolfo Ruiz Cortines
Fernando Casas Alemán	Ambassador Extraordinary and Plenipotentiary	1 April 1960 (Note: Concurrently accredited to Greece while residing in Rome)	9 November 1960	5 May 1963	Adolfo López Mateos
Francisco del Río y Cañedo	Ambassador Extraordinary and Plenipotentiary	5 May 1963	28 June 1963	19 August 1963 (Note: Died in Padua)	Adolfo López Mateos
Arturo López de Ortigosa Ruz	Interim Chargé d'affaires	19 August 1963		22 March 1964	Adolfo López Mateos
Rafael Fernando Fuentes Boettiger	Ambassador Extraordinary and Plenipotentiary	3 April 1964	22 May 1964	3 August 1966	Adolfo López Mateos
Antonio Gómez Robledo	Ambassador Extraordinary and Plenipotentiary	1 December 1966	1 February 1967	18 January 1971	Gustavo Díaz Ordaz
Francisco Medina Ascencio	Ambassador Extraordinary and Plenipotentiary	1 January 1971	19 January 1971	30 November 1972	Luis Echeverría
Norberto Treviño Zapata	Ambassador Extraordinary and Plenipotentiary	1 December 1972 (Note: Expanded to include Tunisia in 1973 and Malta in 1976)	10 January 1973	17 December 1976	Luis Echeverría
Héctor Pérez-Gallardo y García de la Cadena	Interim Chargé d'affaires	17 December 1976		24 July 1977	
Fausto Zapata	Ambassador Extraordinary and Plenipotentiary	1 March 1977	28 March 1977	31 July 1977	José López Portillo
Augusto Gómez Villanueva	Ambassador Extraordinary and Plenipotentiary	1 August 1977 (Note: Concurrently accredited to Malta on 6 September 1977)	28 September 1977	23 March 1981	José López Portillo
Luis Weckmann	Ambassador Extraordinary and Plenipotentiary	1 April 1981	3 June 1981	26 April 1986	José López Portillo
Octavio Rivero Serrano	Ambassador Extraordinary and Plenipotentiary	29 January 1986	27 May 1986	11 February 1988	Miguel de la Madrid
Horacio Flores de la Peña	Ambassador Extraordinary and Plenipotentiary	5 February 1988 (Note: Concurrently accredited to the FAO)	16 April 1988	20 June 1990	Miguel de la Madrid
Jaime Nualart	Interim Chargé d'affaires	20 June 1990		21 September 1990	
Francisco Javier Alejo	Ambassador Extraordinary and Plenipotentiary	1 September 1990 (Note: Concurrently accredited to the FAO)	21 September 1990	21 February 1993	Carlos Salinas de Gortari
Dante Delgado Rannauro	Ambassador Extraordinary and Plenipotentiary	19 March 1993 (Note: Concurrently Accredited to Malta, Albania, FAO, WFP, and WFC)	15 April 1993	12 June 1994	Carlos Salinas de Gortari
Mario Moya Palencia	Ambassador Extraordinary and Plenipotentiary	4 July 1994 (Note: Concurrently Accredited to Malta, Albania, IFAD and, WFP)	19 July 1994	28 February 2001	Carlos Salinas de Gortari
Mario Moya Palencia	Ambassador Extraordinary and Plenipotentiary	4 July 1994	19 July 1994	28 February 2001	Ernesto Zedillo
Rafael Tovar y de Teresa	Ambassador Extraordinary and Plenipotentiary	1 February 2001	19 April 2001	20 June 2007	Vicente Fox
Jorge Eduardo Chen Charpentier	Ambassador Extraordinary and Plenipotentiary	20 June 2007	11 September 2007	12 July 2011	Felipe Calderón
Miguel Ruiz-Cabañas Izquierdo	Ambassador Extraordinary and Plenipotentiary	3 August 2011	12 September 2011	12 October 2015	Felipe Calderón
Juan José Guerra Abud	Ambassador Extraordinary and Plenipotentiary	15 December 2015	3 March 2016	30 November 2018	Enrique Peña Nieto
Carlos Eugenio Garcia de Alba Zepeda	Ambassador Extraordinary and Plenipotentiary	25 September 2019	14 November 2019	Incumbent	Andrés Manuel López Obrador

== See also ==
- Albania–Mexico relations
- Italy–Mexico relations
