= Italy–Mexico relations =

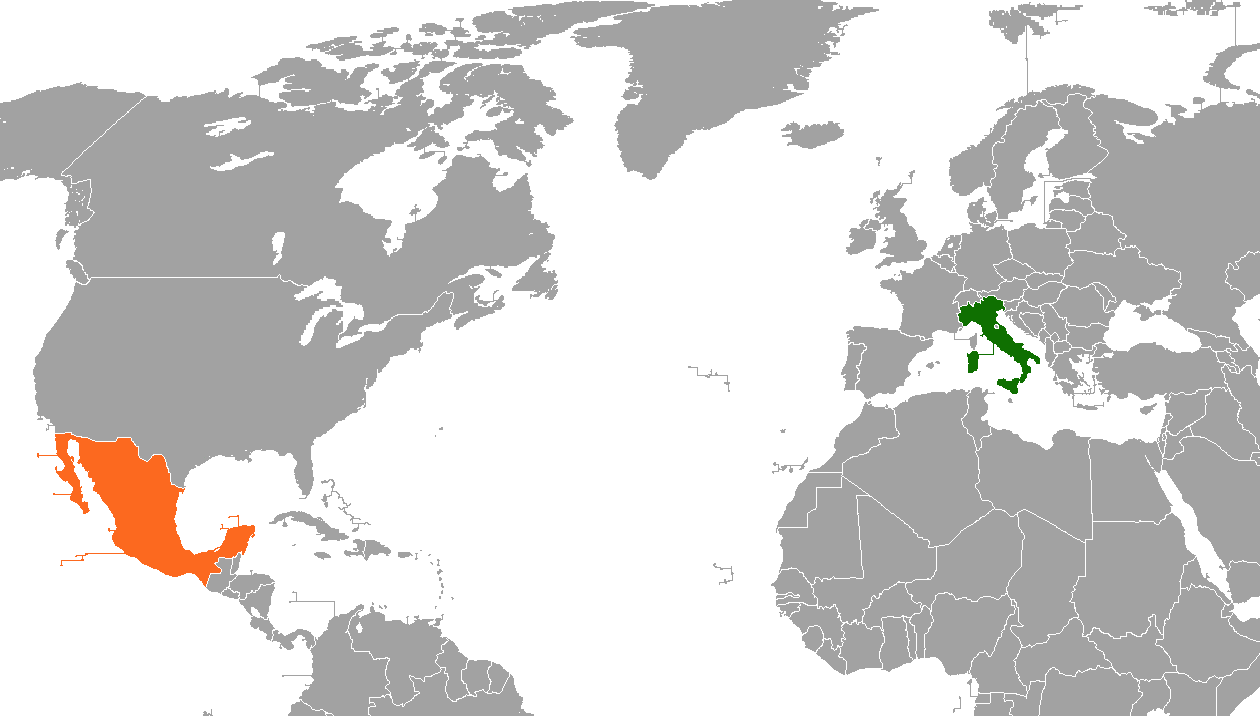

- Italy: Mexico

The nations of Italy and Mexico first established formal diplomatic relations in 1874, following the unification of Italy. The two nations were twice on the opposite sides of 20th century conflicts: first in the Spanish Civil War from 1936 to 1939, and later during World War II from 1942 to 1945. Mexico re-established diplomatic relations with Italy in 1946 and relations have continued unabated since.

Both nations are members of the G20, Organisation for Economic Co-operation and Development and the United Nations.

== History ==
The first contact between Italy and Mexico was in 1869, just before the end of Italian unification in 1870; when Italy expressed its desire to open a consulate in Mexico. An Italian consulate was opened in Mexico in December 1872; however, diplomatic relations between the two nations were not established until 15 December 1874. In 1875, Mexico opened a diplomatic office in Rome. The first Italian migrants arrived to Mexico as early as 1857 with larger waves arriving in the 1880s. Many of the migrants established several Italian-speaking towns throughout the country.

During World War I, Mexico remained neutral because it was involved in its own revolution during the same time and closed its diplomatic office in Rome. It re-opened its diplomatic office in 1918 and moved into its current chancery building in 1922.

In the 1930s, diplomatic relations between the two nations began to deteriorate when Italian Prime Minister Benito Mussolini invaded and annexed Abyssinia (now Ethiopia) during the Second Italo-Ethiopian War in 1935–1936. Mexico was one of the few countries to vehemently oppose the occupation of Abyssinia by Italian forces. During the Spanish Civil War (1936–1939), Italy and Mexico supported opposing sides of the conflict, with Mexico supporting the Republicans and Italy supporting the Nationalists. That put both nations against each other and ultimately caused a largely-negative interaction between them.

During World War II, on 22 May 1942, Mexico declared war on the Axis powers (which included Italy) due to German U-boat attacks on two Mexican oil tankers in the Gulf of Mexico that same year. Diplomatic relations were re-established on 1 June 1946 and Italy and Mexico signed a Treaty of Peace on 10 February 1947.

In 1974, President Luis Echeverría Álvarez became the first Mexican head-of-state to visit Italy. In 1981, President Sandro Pertini became the first Italian head-of-state to visit Mexico. Since the initial visits, there have been numerous visits between leaders of both nations.

On 17 October 2017, the V Meeting of the Mexico-Italy Binational Commission was held in Rome, headed by the Mexican Secretary of Foreign Affairs, Luis Videgaray and the Italian Minister of Foreign Affairs Angelino Alfano.

In 2024, both nations celebrate 150 years since initially establishing diplomatic relations.

== High-level visits ==
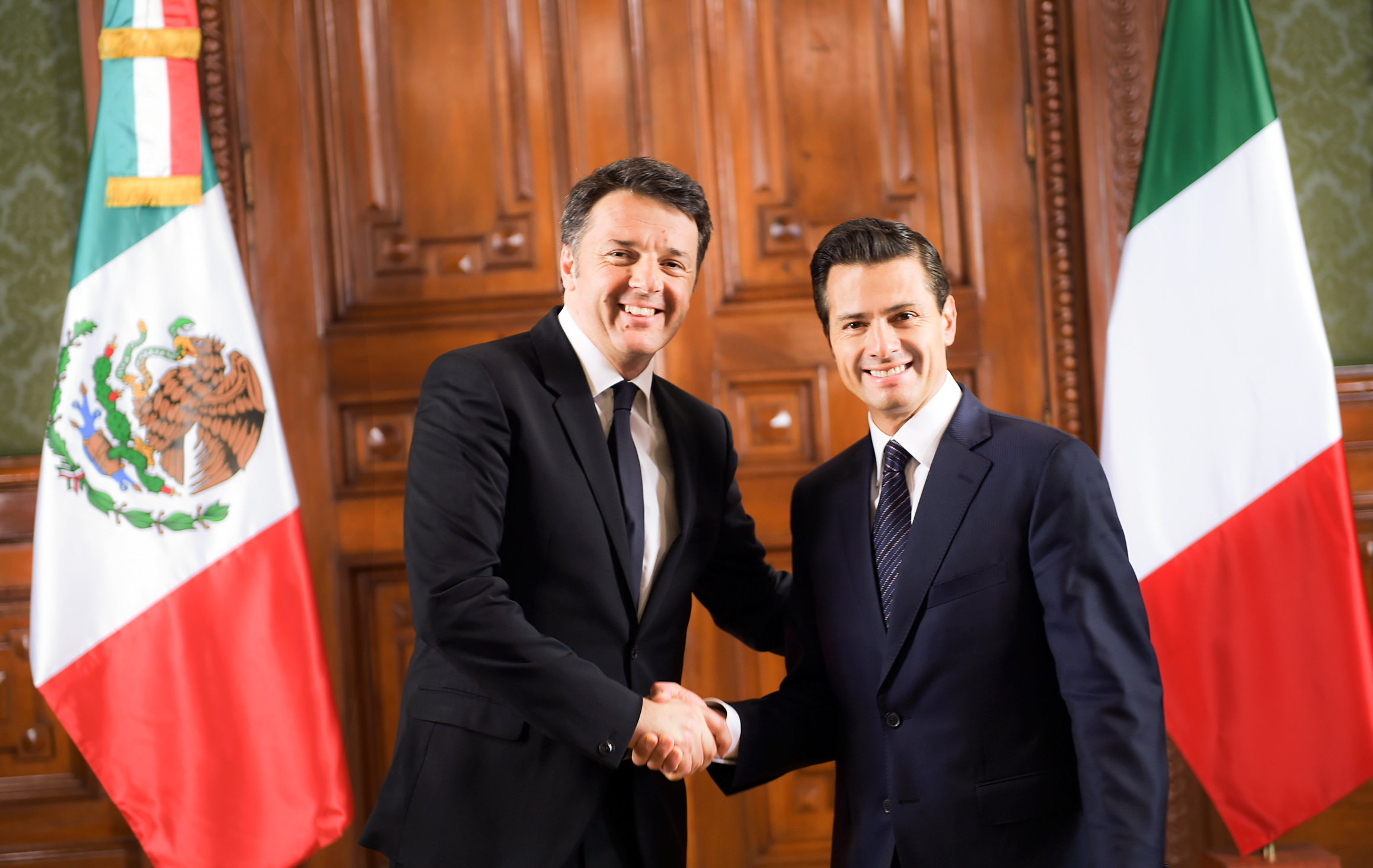
Mexican President Enrique Peña Nieto with Italian Prime Minister Matteo Renzi in Mexico City; 2016

High-level visits from Italy to Mexico

- President Sandro Pertini (1981)
- Prime Minister Giulio Andreotti (1990)
- President Oscar Luigi Scalfaro (1996)
- Prime Minister Silvio Berlusconi (2002)
- Prime Minister Mario Monti (2012)
- Prime Minister Enrico Letta (2014)
- Prime Minister Matteo Renzi (2016)
- President Sergio Mattarella (2016)

High-level visits from Mexico to Italy

- President Luis Echeverría Álvarez (1974)
- President Carlos Salinas de Gortari (1991)
- President Ernesto Zedillo (1996)
- President Vicente Fox (January and October 2001, 2005)
- President Felipe Calderón (2007, 2009, 2011)
- President Enrique Peña Nieto (2013, 2014, 2015)

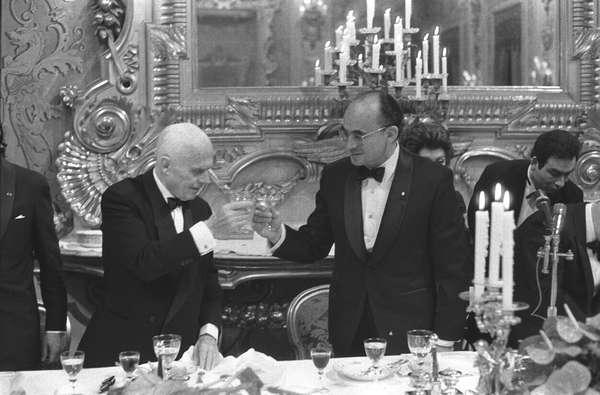
President Sandro Pertini with visiting President Luis Echeverría in Rome; February 1974.

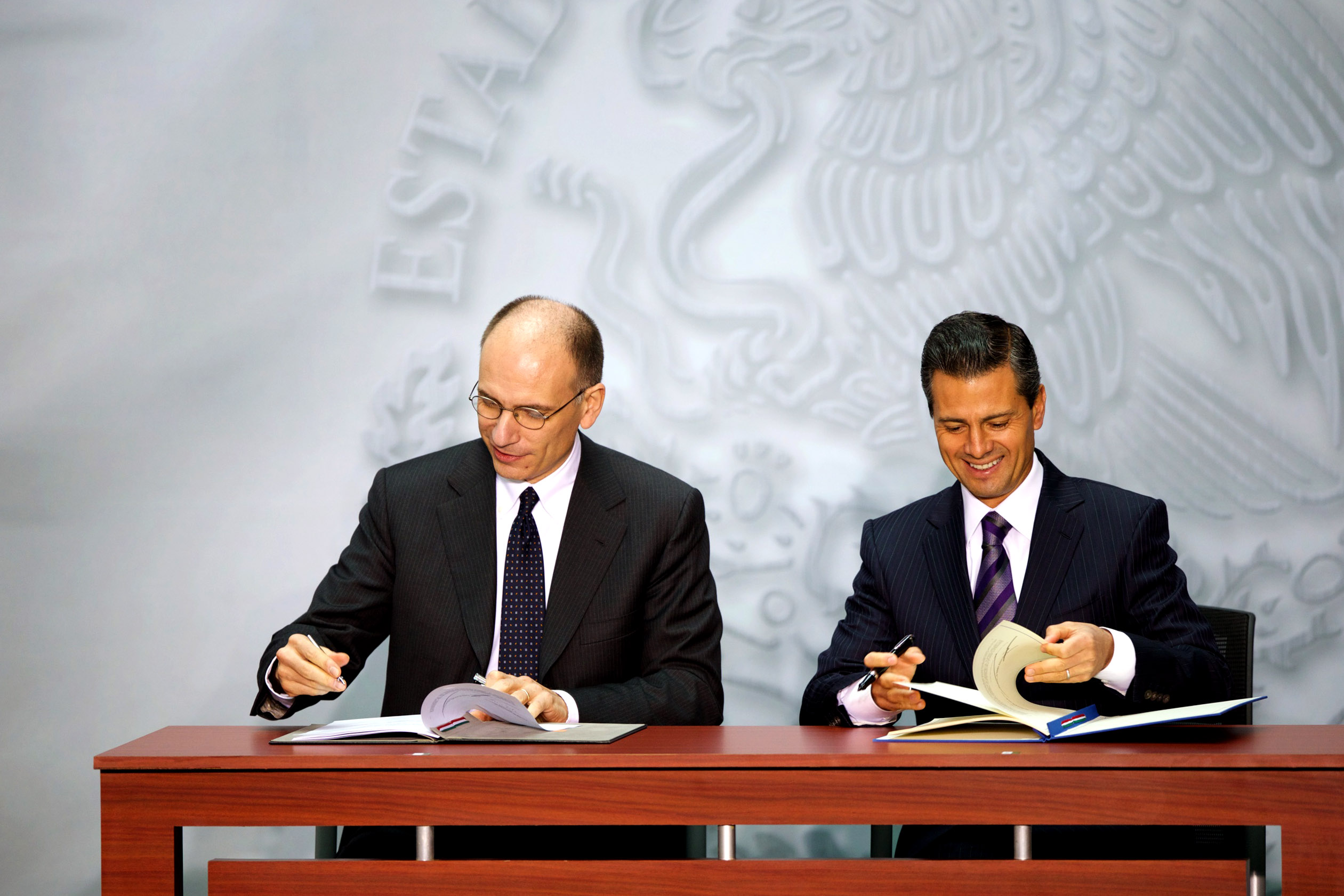
Prime Minister Enrico Letta and President Enrique Peña Nieto in Mexico City; 2014.

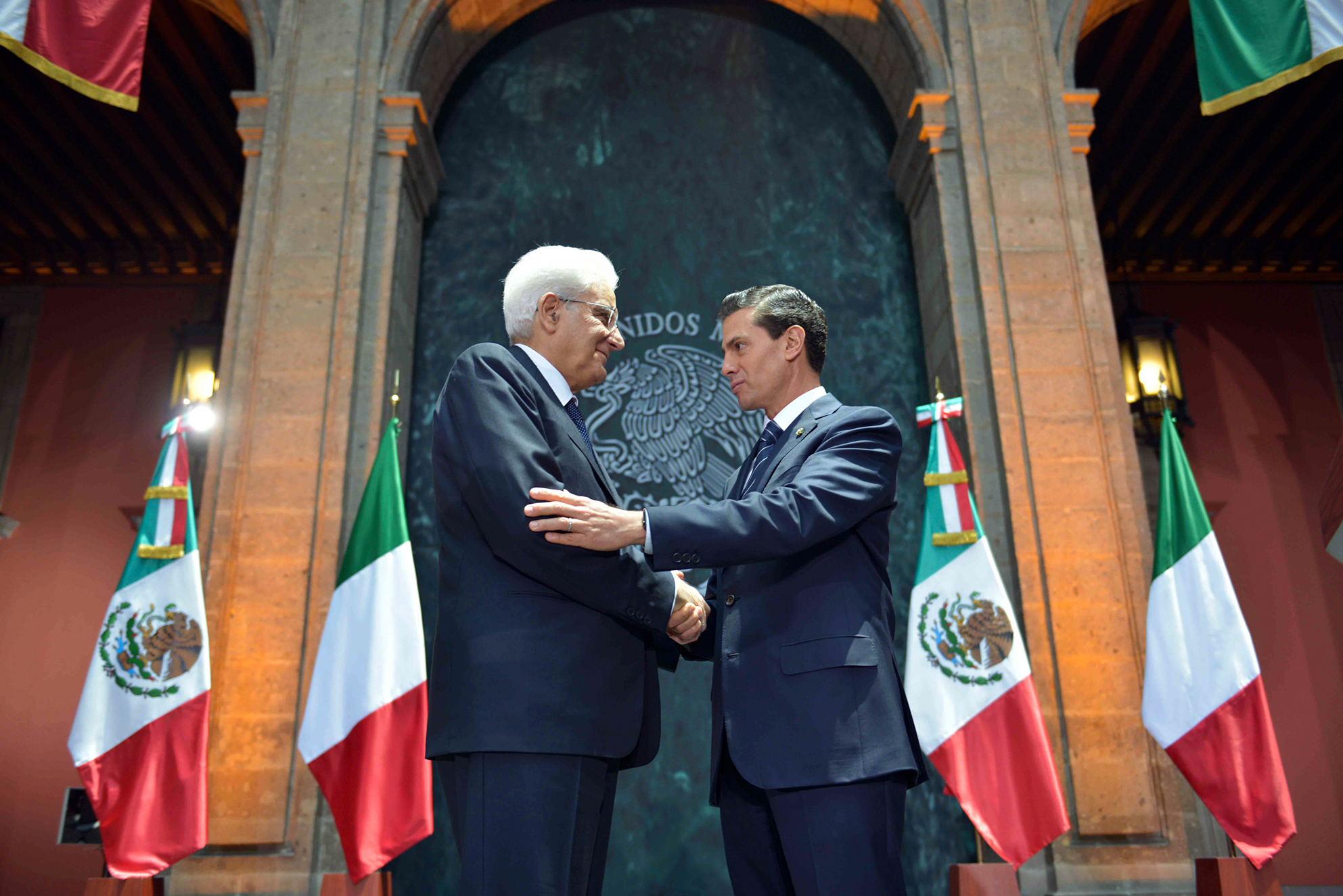
President Sergio Mattarella and President Enrique Peña Nieto in Mexico City; 2016.

== Bilateral agreements ==
Both nations have signed numerous bilateral agreements such as a Treaty of General Compulsory Arbitration (1907); Agreement in the Recognition of Consular Marriages Celebrated and Administered in both Nations Diplomatic Missions (1910); Agreement of Cultural Exchanges (1965); Agreement on Air Transportation (1965); Agreement on Technical Cooperation (1981); Agreement on the Avoidance of Double-Taxation and Tax Evasion (1991); Agreement of Cooperation in the Fight against the Misuse and Illicit Trafficking in Narcotic Drugs and Psychotropic Substances (1991); Agreement on Tourism Cooperation (1993); Framework Cooperation Agreement (1994); Agreement in Scientific and Technological Cooperation (1997); Agreement in the Promotion and Reciprocal Protection of Investments (1999); Agreement of Cooperation in Combating Organized Crime (2001); Agreement on Mutual Administrative Assistance in Customs Matters (2011); Extradition Treaty (2011); Treaty in the Assistance in Criminal Legal Matters (2011); ASI-AEM Memorandum of Understanding for space cooperation for peaceful purposes (2012); Memorandum of Understanding for the creation of the Italian-Mexican Business Council (2012); Memorandum of Understanding on Cooperation in the Energy Sector (2016); Memorandum of Understanding on Cooperation on Biodiversity, Climate Change Vulnerability, Risk Assessment, Adaptation and Myths (2016) and an Agreement on Cinematographic Co-production (2017).

== Transportation ==
There are direct flights between Italy and Mexico with Aeroméxico and Neos airline.

== Economic cooperation ==
In 1997 Mexico signed a Free Trade Agreement with the European Union (which includes Italy). In 2023 two-way trade between Italy and Mexico amounted to US$8.5 billion. Italy's main exports to Mexico include: pharmaceutical products, nuclear reactors, boilers, machines, apparatus and mechanical devices and precious metals. Mexico's main exports to Italy include: vehicles, crude oil, lead minerals and their concentrates and ethylene polyterephthalate.

There are about 1,600 Italian companies operating in Mexico, also including small investments in the hotel and restaurant sectors. There are about 350 companies present in a structured way (including the commercial presence only). Of these, about a hundred with a production plant. The large industrial groups operating in Mexico have determined the arrival of dozens of small/medium subcontractors, with plants located in the industrial districts, particularly in the automotive and energy sectors. Italian companies are concentrated in the metropolitan areas of Mexico City and Monterrey, in the industrial park of Querétaro and in the "footwear district" in Guanajuato, in addition to small/medium investments in the hospitality and catering sectors in the tourist area of the "Riviera Maya". Both big national industrial companies and medium-sized companies have increased interest in Mexico and have carried out important projects (among others, Enel Green Power, Ferrero, Pirelli, FCA, Brembo, Barilla, Saipem, Micoperi, Bonatti, Elica, OMPI Stevanato, Maccaferri, Eurotranciatura, Sicinsaldo, Techint, Bomi Group, Bormioli, Chiesi, DiaSorin, Kedrion). Eni was the first foreign company to start oil extraction in the Gulf of Mexico in 2019.

Mexican multinational companies such as Avntk, Grupo Bimbo, Gruma and Orbia operate in Italy. Mexico also invests in Italy, in particular in the food, plastic piping, aeronautics, financial and design sectors.

== Cultural cooperation ==
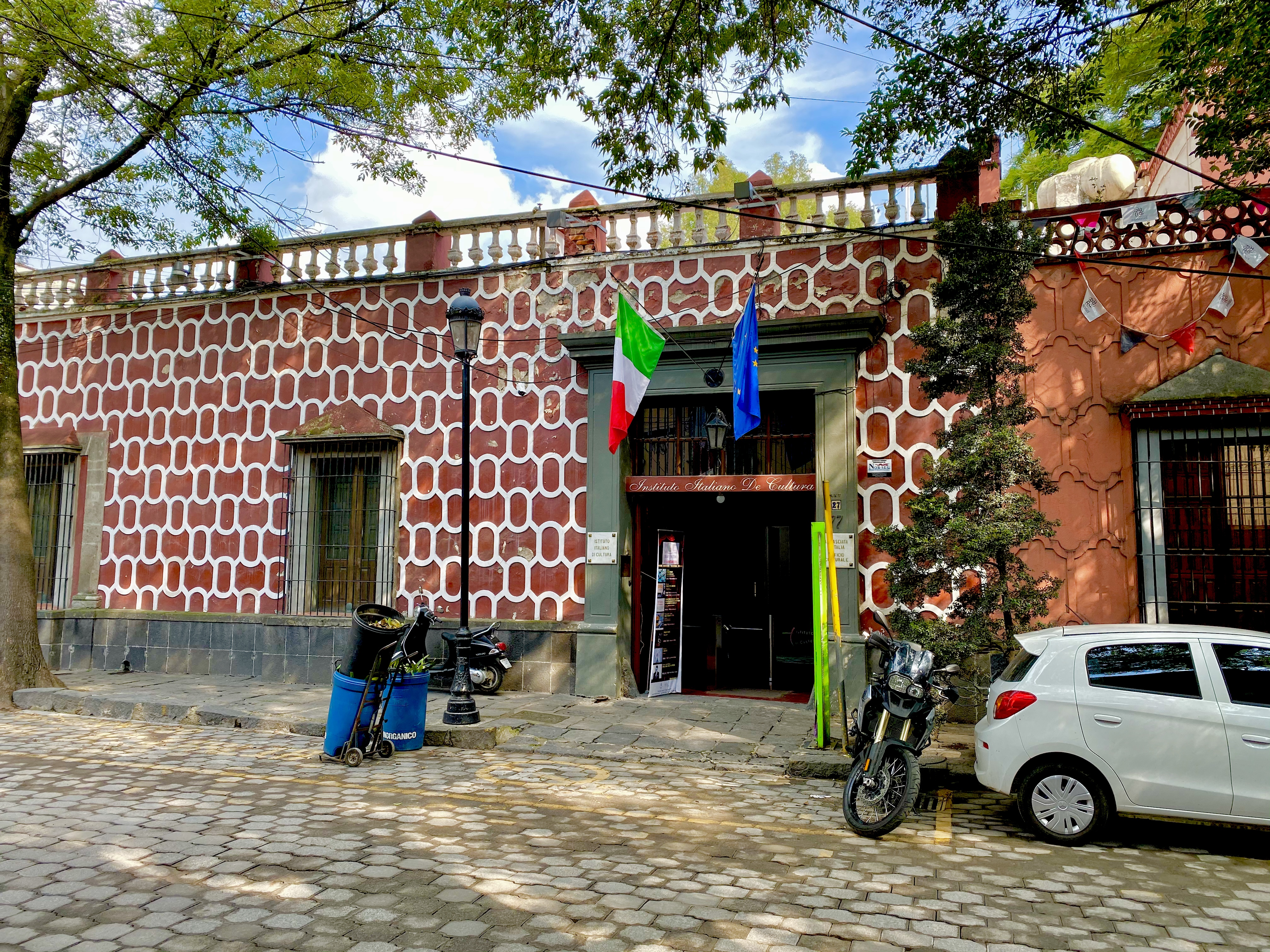
The Istituto Italiano di Cultura in Mexico City

A relationship of cultural diplomacy between Mexico and Italy was officially born in 1965, when the Agreement of Cultural Exchanges was signed. Alongside this, diverse political, economical and cultural agreements were signed. The birth of the cultural agreements between Italy and Mexico should be understood in a broad perspective of the political rapprochement between Mexico and Europe after World War II. The political and economic climate in which the cultural agreement was born saw, on the one hand, a Mexico politically and economically in difficulty and Italy living the years of the famous "Italian economic miracle" (1958-1963). Italy had affirmed itself as an industrial country and enjoyed an economic renaissance of which the United States had been the determining element after World War II. Italy, unlike Mexico, had adhered to the postwar liberalization of international exchanges with a considerable increase in the total volume of world trade, also due to the stability and exchange between currencies after the Bretton Woods Agreements. The cultural agreements were the witnesses of a trajectory of political, economic and financial rapprochement as a consequence of Mexico's insertion into the global economy when it became a member of the GATT (in 1986) and then the OECD (since 1992) and after the liberalization of trade with its accession to the FTA / NAFTA. Only since 1994 has Mexico's foreign policy assumed an aspect of openness and cooperation.

In addition, the Istituto Italiano di Cultura can be found in the capital. It is an office of the Italian embassy and its main aim is the promotion and spread of the Italian language and culture. More than 30,000 Mexican students attend the courses offered by the Istituto Italiano, by the cultural institution Società Dante Alighieri and by Mexican schools and universities.

Besides providing courses on Italian language and culture (on literature, arts, theatre and cinema) the Institute organizes festivals, concerts, art exhibitions, conferences, theatre and dance performances. Furthermore, the Institute encourages the participation of Italian artists at local events and tries to implement relations between Mexican and Italian universities and schools.

== Resident diplomatic missions ==
- Italy has an embassy in Mexico City.
- Mexico has an embassy in Rome and a consulate-general in Milan.

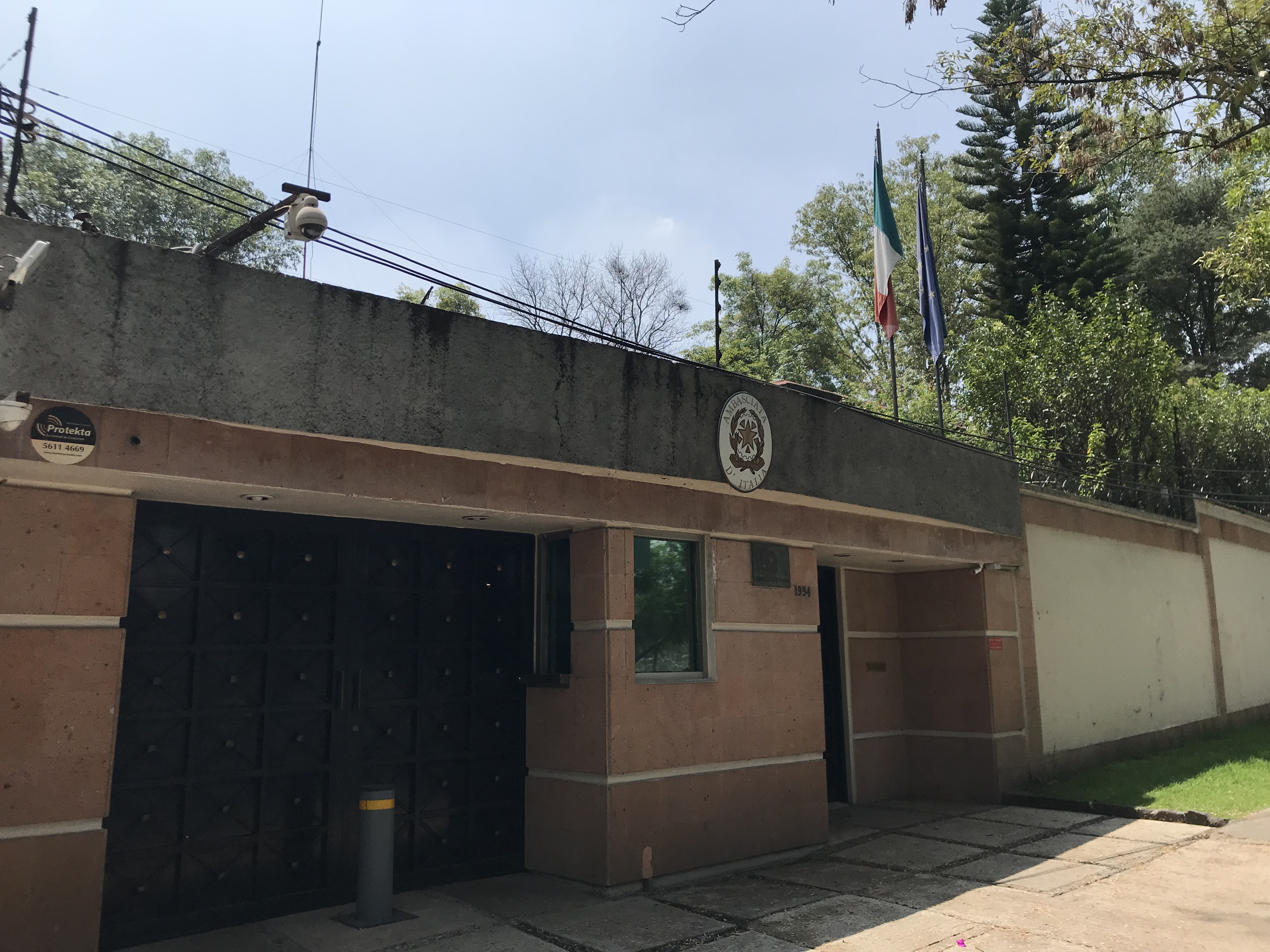
Embassy of Italy in Mexico City

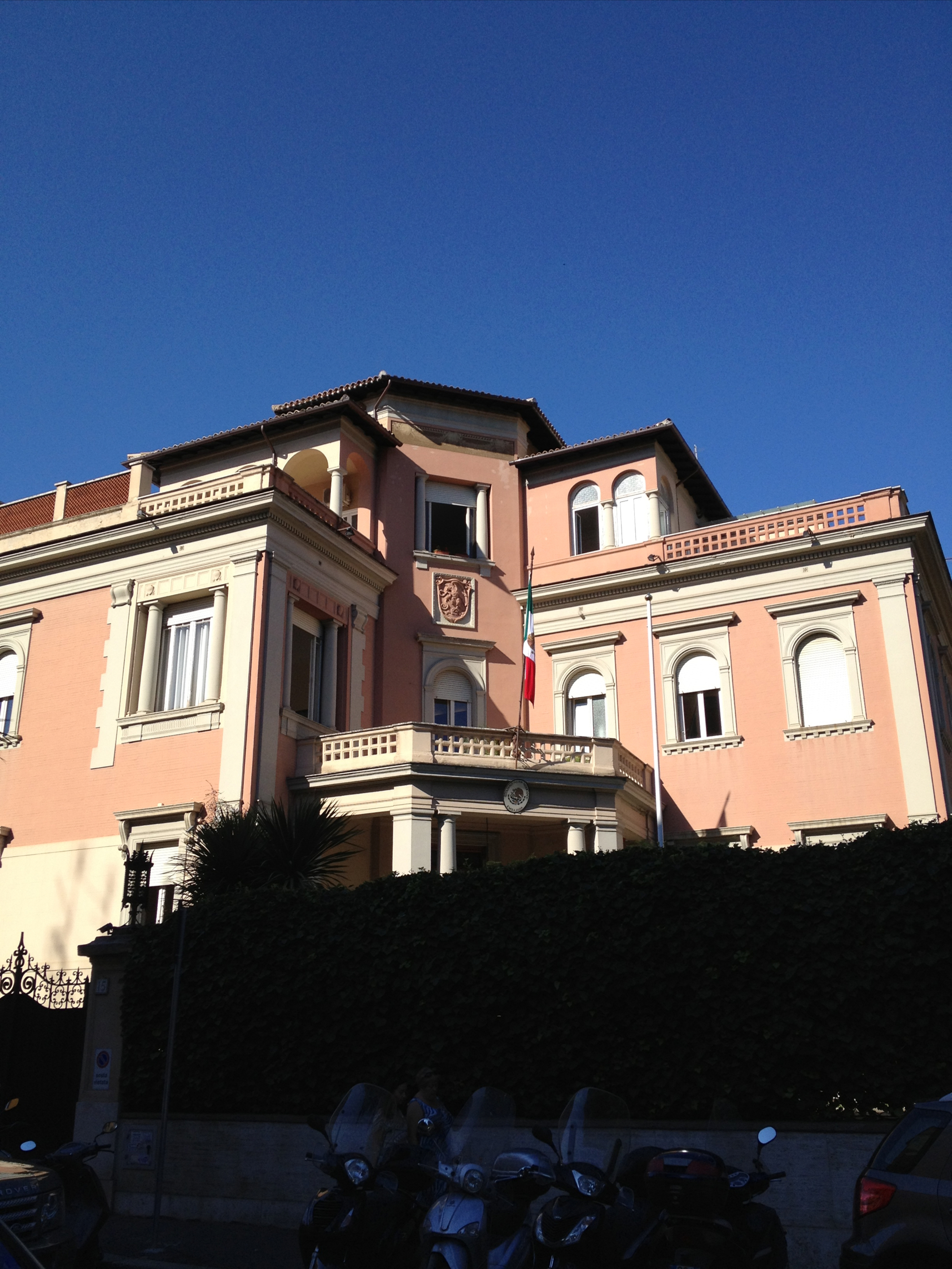
Embassy of Mexico in Rome

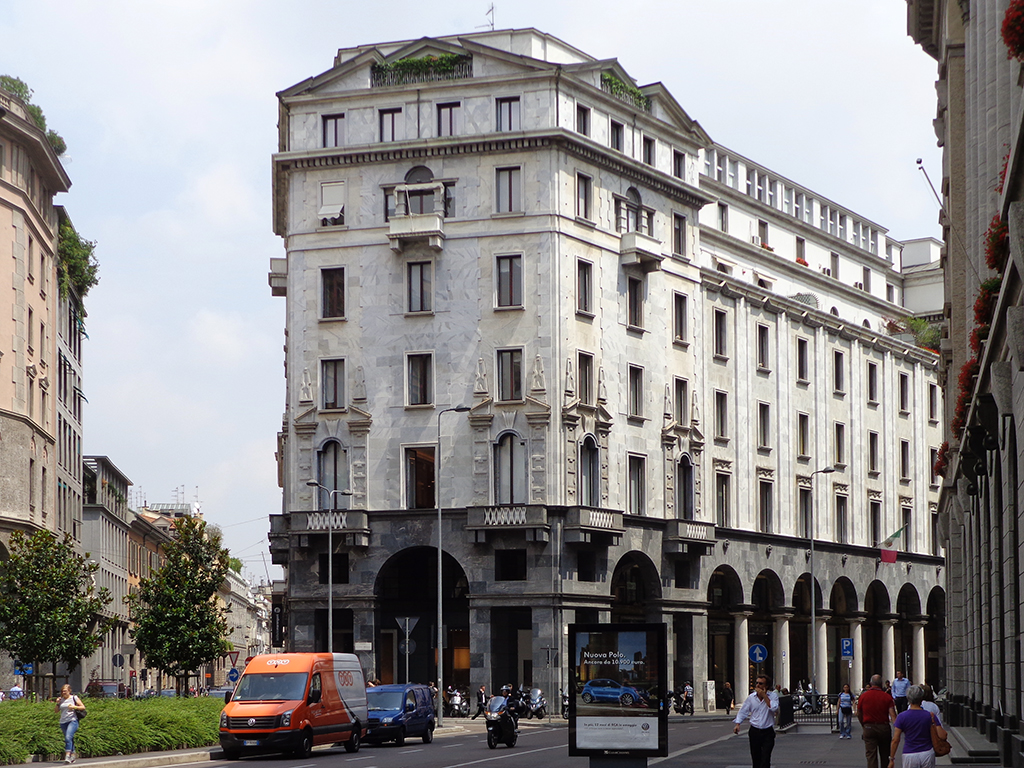
Consulate-General of Mexico in Milan

== See also ==
- List of ambassadors of Mexico to Italy
- Foreign relations of Italy
- Foreign relations of Mexico
- Chipilo
- Nueva Italia, Michoacán
- Italian immigration to Mexico
