= Albania–Brazil relations =

- Albania: Brazil

Albania–Brazil relations are the bilateral relations between Albania and Brazil. Albania has an embassy in Brasília, and Brazil has an embassy in Tirana.

== History ==
Diplomatic ties were established between Albania and Brazil in 1961. In 2000, the then-foreign Minister of Albania Paskal Milo made a first official visit to Brasília for political dialogue and economic cooperation.

In 2013, Brazil opened its resident diplomatic mission in Tirana, while Albania has had an embassy in Brasilia since 2009. Mrs. Tatiana Gonaj was appointed as Albania first resident ambassador to Brazil and Mr. Rudá Gonzales Seferin appointed as Brazil's first resident ambassador to Albania.

== Cooperation ==
There exists a Cultural Association and also a Chamber of Commerce and Industry 'Brazil-Albania'.

On June 20, 2012 the Prime Minister of Albania, Sali Berisha visited Brazil during an official trip to attend the Rio 20 Summit, while prior to that the Foreign Minister of Albania, Edmond Haxhinasto visited Brazil. The Foreign Minister was received by Michel Temer, than Vice President of Brazil and Senator Fernando Collor de Mello. A bilateral agreement was signed by both countries in future economic cooperation and also a visa abolition agreement. Since 2011 citizens of both countries can travel visa-free.

In March, 2012, the Brazilian Minister of Agriculture, Livestock, and Supply, Mendes Ribeiro visited Tirana and a bilateral agreement on agricultural cooperation was signed.

In March 2025, Brazil exported $12.9M to Albania, mainly poultry meat, frozen bovine meat, and coffee, and imported $213k, resulting in a trade surplus of $12.7M.

== High level visits ==
Guest	Host	Place of visit	Date of visit
(Albania) Prime Minister Sali Berisha	United Nations Conference on Sustainable Development	Rio de Janeiro	June 20, 2012
(Albania) Foreign Minister Edmond Haxhinasto	(Brazil) Vice President Michel Temer	Rio de Janeiro	June 20, 2012
(Albania) Foreign Minister Ditmir Bushati	(Brazil) Foreign Minister Mauro Vieira	Rio de Janeiro	November 4, 2013

== Resident diplomatic missions ==
Of Albania

- Brasília (Embassy)

Of Brazil

- Tirana (Embassy)

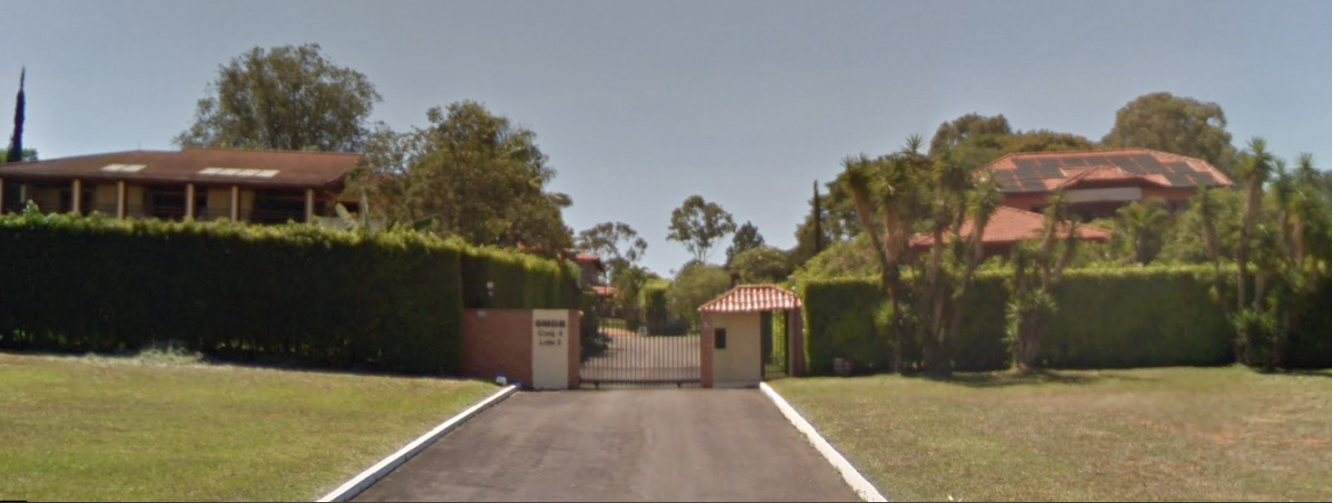
Embassy of Albania in Brasília

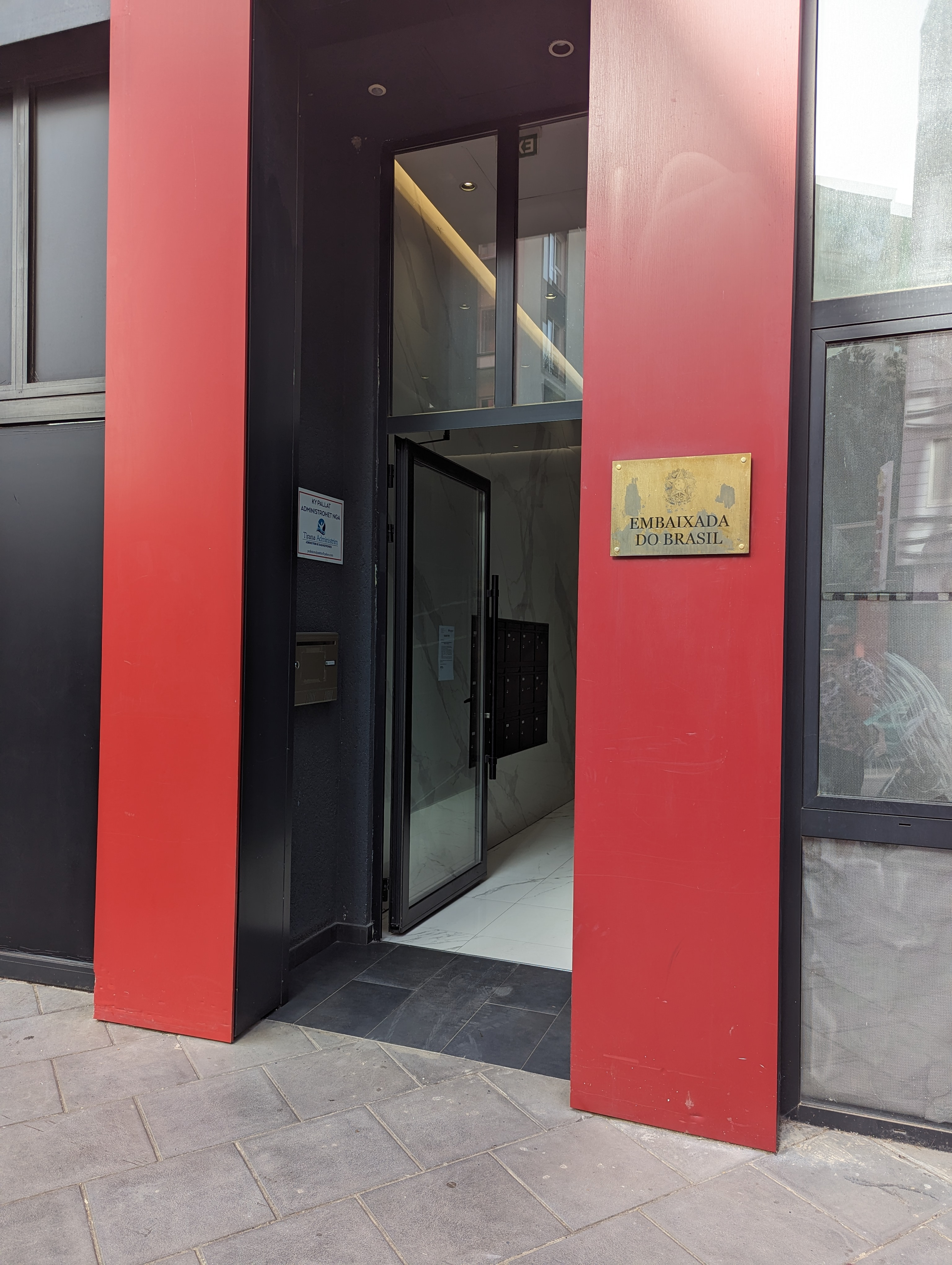
Embassy of Brazil in Tirana

== See also ==
- Foreign relations of Albania
- Foreign relations of Brazil
