= Artemis Malo =

Albanian politician and diplomat (born 1981)

Albanian Ambassador to Canada
- Incumbent
- Assumed office July 2024
- President: Bajram Begaj
- Prime Minister: Edi Rama
- Preceded by: Ermal Muça

Member of the Albanian Parliament
- In office 2019–2021

Deputy Minister for Europe and Foreign Affairs
- In office 2017–2024

Personal details
- Born: Artemis Kosta Dralo; May 19, 1981 (age 45) Gjirokastër, PR Albania
- Party: Socialist Party of Albania
- Education: PhD in Linguistics; MA in Translation; Law degree
- Occupation: Politician, diplomat

Artemis Kosta Malo (née Dralo; born May 19, 1981) is an Albanian politician and diplomat who has served as the Ambassador of Albania to Canada since July 2024. She previously served as Deputy Minister for Europe and Foreign Affairs of Albania and as a member of the Albanian Parliament.

== Early life and education ==
Malo was born in Gjirokastër, Albania. She earned a PhD in Linguistics in January 2016 from the Faculty of Education and Social Sciences at the University of Tirana. In June 2011, she received the academic title of "Docent" from Eqrem Çabej University in Gjirokastër. She also holds a Master's degree in Translation Studies from the University of Tirana (2006), as well as degrees in Law and in English Philology and Civilization.

== Political and diplomatic career ==
From 2017 to 2019 and again from 2021 to 2024, Malo served as Deputy Minister at the Ministry for Europe and Foreign Affairs. Between 2019 and 2021, she was elected to the Albanian Parliament, where she was active in multiple parliamentary commissions, including the Commission for National Security, the Commission for European Integration, the Economic Commission, and the Commission for Legal Affairs, Public Administration, and Human Rights.

In July 2024, Malo was appointed Ambassador of Albania to Canada by presidential decree from President Bajram Begaj, following her nomination by Prime Minister Edi Rama. She succeeded Ermal Muça, who had held the post since February 2024.
