= Albania–Estonia relations =

- Albania: Estonia

Albania–Estonia relations are the bilateral relations between Albania and Estonia. Both countries are members of NATO, the Council of Europe and the Organization for Security and Co-operation in Europe. The diplomatic relations between Estonia and Albania were established on 17 January 1992. Estonia has always supported Albania on its path to the NATO membership and the EU membership.

== History ==
During the visit of the President of Albania to Tallinn in October 2019, a memorandum of understanding was signed between the Foreign Ministries of Estonia and Albania on cooperation in European integration.

In December 2019, Estonia provided 50,000 euros in humanitarian aid to Albania to help alleviate the consequences of the earthquake.

There is an Estonian ambassador to Albania, who resides in Athens. There is also an Albanian ambassador to Estonia, who resides in Warsaw.

== High level visits ==
=== High-level visits from Albania to Estonia ===
- 1–2 October 2019 — Albanian President Ilir Meta visited Estonia; during the visit a Memorandum of Understanding on European Integration was signed.
- 5 September 2024 – Albanian President Bajram Begaj traveled to Estonia as part of his broader state visits to the Baltic region. Upon arrival, he was welcomed by President Alar Karis, with whom he conducted a bilateral meeting that prioritised the enhancement of relations between their respective nations. A key focus of their discussions was the proposal to establish a permanent direct flight route between Tallinn and Tirana, aimed at facilitating greater connectivity. Additionally, Begaj engaged with Minister of Defence Hanno Pevkur, aligning their objectives in accordance with NATO initiatives. He expressed profound appreciation for Estonia's collaborative efforts in the domain of cybersecurity, particularly in light of the significant cyberattack that occurred in 2022.

=== High-level visits from Estonia to Albania ===
- The first official visit of Estonian President Alar Karis to Albania occurred in June 2023, focusing on EU and NATO cooperation especially in the realms of cybersecurity and digital governance.

== Diplomatic missions ==
Neither country has a resident ambassador.

- Albania is accredited to Estonia from its embassy in Warsaw, Poland.
- Estonia is accredited to Albania from its embassy in Athens, Greece.

== See also ==
- Foreign relations of Albania
- Foreign relations of Estonia
