= Albania–Palestine relations =

- Albania: Palestine

Albania and Palestine established diplomatic relations in 1990. Albania had already recognized Palestine as a state since 1988. Palestine has an embassy in Tirana, but Albania does not have an embassy in Palestine. Both are member of the Organisation of Islamic Cooperation.

== History ==
The People's Socialist Republic of Albania saw parallels between the situation in Palestine and its own circumstances. Both were small entities facing threats from hostile powers and surrounded by unfriendly neighbors. The attainment of independence for both Albania and Palestine, in the eyes of Albania, depended on a strategy of complete mobilization and a commitment to popular war.

In July 1970, Tirana received a Fatah delegation headed by Khalil Ibrahim al-Wazir, known as Abu Jihad after which Tirana agreed to the opening of a PLO representative office in Albania. Al-Wazir was welcomed by the Minister of Defense Beqir Balluku, Prime Minister Mehmet Shehu, and First Secretary of the PLA Enver Hoxha.

After it emerged that the September 1972 attack at the Munich Olympics was enacted by Black September, a group close to Fatah, Albania suspended ongoing military training of Palestinian fighters; thirty of whom had undergone a six-month training period in Albania in 1971. Albania aimed to avoid any association with or accusations of being a Communist country that endorsed terrorism. The PLO-Albania relationship faced additional strain due to the expulsion of Palestinian students studying in Tirana. In 1971, eleven Palestinians were admitted to the University of Tirana to strengthen bilateral ties. Despite the intention for them to study and learn from Albania's socialist model, the Palestinian students struggled to adapt to the socialist lifestyle. State security agency Sigurimi reported their dissatisfaction with the country, praising the Soviet Union, highlighting a discord between PLO and Albania positions. Some engaged in illegal activities such smuggling of goods, leading to arrests on charges of conspiracy, espionage, and "terrorist attitudes," ultimately resulting in their expulsion.

Although the PLO sought Albania's support, especially in the establishment of a representative office, the Albanian Communist regime, while maintaining a public display of backing for the PLO, privately refrained from further engagement, particularly concerning military aid. The PLO's pivot toward the Soviet Union and Eastern European countries post the 1973 war heightened the Albanian regime's skepticism, leading it to view the PLO more as a pawn of the Soviets than a genuinely revolutionary entity.

Despite the PLO's left-wing credentials, Albania chose not to extend its support, considering Fatah's nationalist umbrella, despite ideological shortcomings, as a unifying force within the Palestinian national movement. The Albanian Communist regime's decision may seem paradoxical, but it was a deliberate choice rooted in the belief that Fatah, with its organizational strength, provided a genuine platform for the unity of diverse ideological groups within the Palestinian context.

In spite of the PLO's support of US-led peace initiatives in 1982 after the Israeli invasion of Lebanon, Albania refused to endorse dissident elements of the PLO. In 1987, the onset of the First Intifada in Gaza was met with approval from Albanian authorities. They commended the uprising for its authenticity as a grassroots movement that had managed to steer clear of the influence of the United States and the USSR.

== Recognition of Palestine ==
After the proclamation of the Palestinian Independence, Albania officially recognized the Palestinian State in 1988 and in 1989 the Embassy of the State of Palestine, with full diplomatic representation, was officially opened in Albania. With the opening of the Embassy, the relations between Albania and Palestine further enhanced by the visit of then Palestinian President Yasser Arafat at the end of 1996.

In March 1998, Prime Minister Fatos Nano visited Gaza City for a meeting with Palestinian Authority President Yasser Arafat.

Albania was one of the 41 countries that abstained in the voting for the application of Palestine for non-member observer state of the United Nations on 29 November 2012.

In 2015, Albania was one of the 119 UN-member countries (out of 193) that voted in favor of raising the Palestinian flag at the UN.

== See also ==
- Foreign relations of Albania
- Foreign relations of Palestine
- International recognition of the State of Palestine
- United Nations General Assembly resolution 67/19
