= Albania–Japan relations =

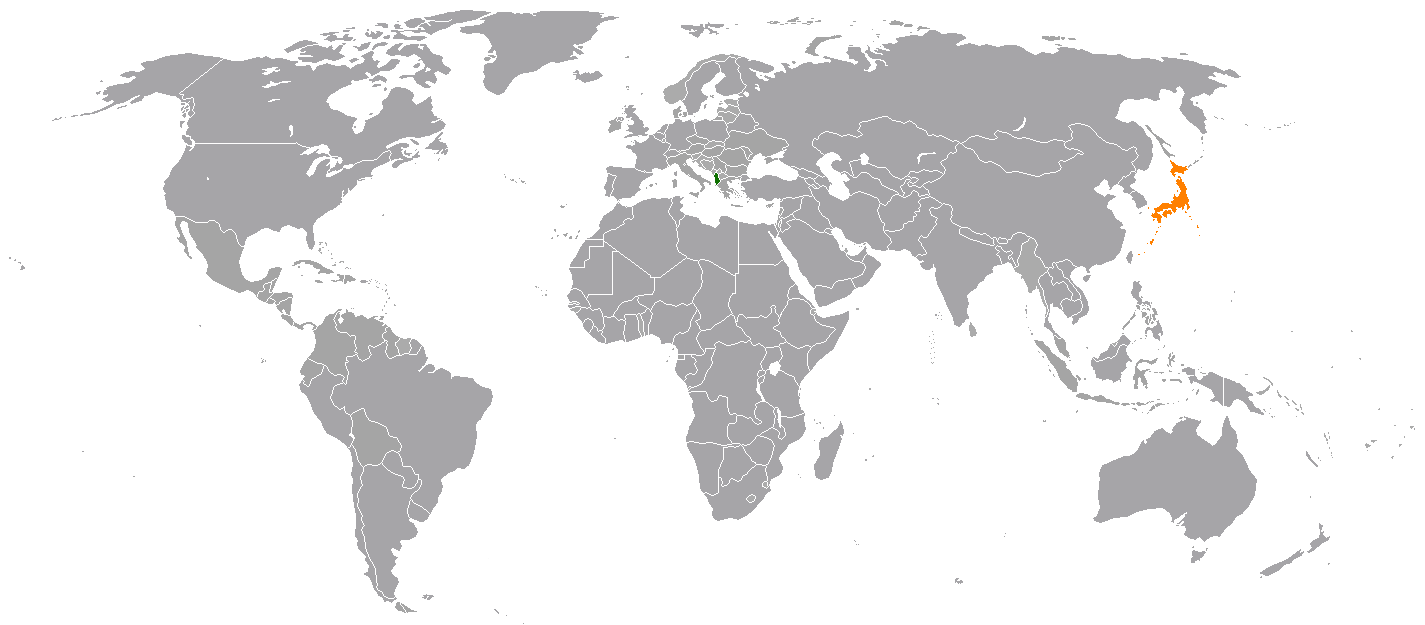
- Albania: Japan

Diplomatic mission
- Embassy of Albania, Tokyo: Embassy of Japan, Tirana

Albania–Japan relations are the bilateral relations between Albania and Japan. Japan has an embassy in Tirana, and Albania has an embassy in Tokyo.

== History ==
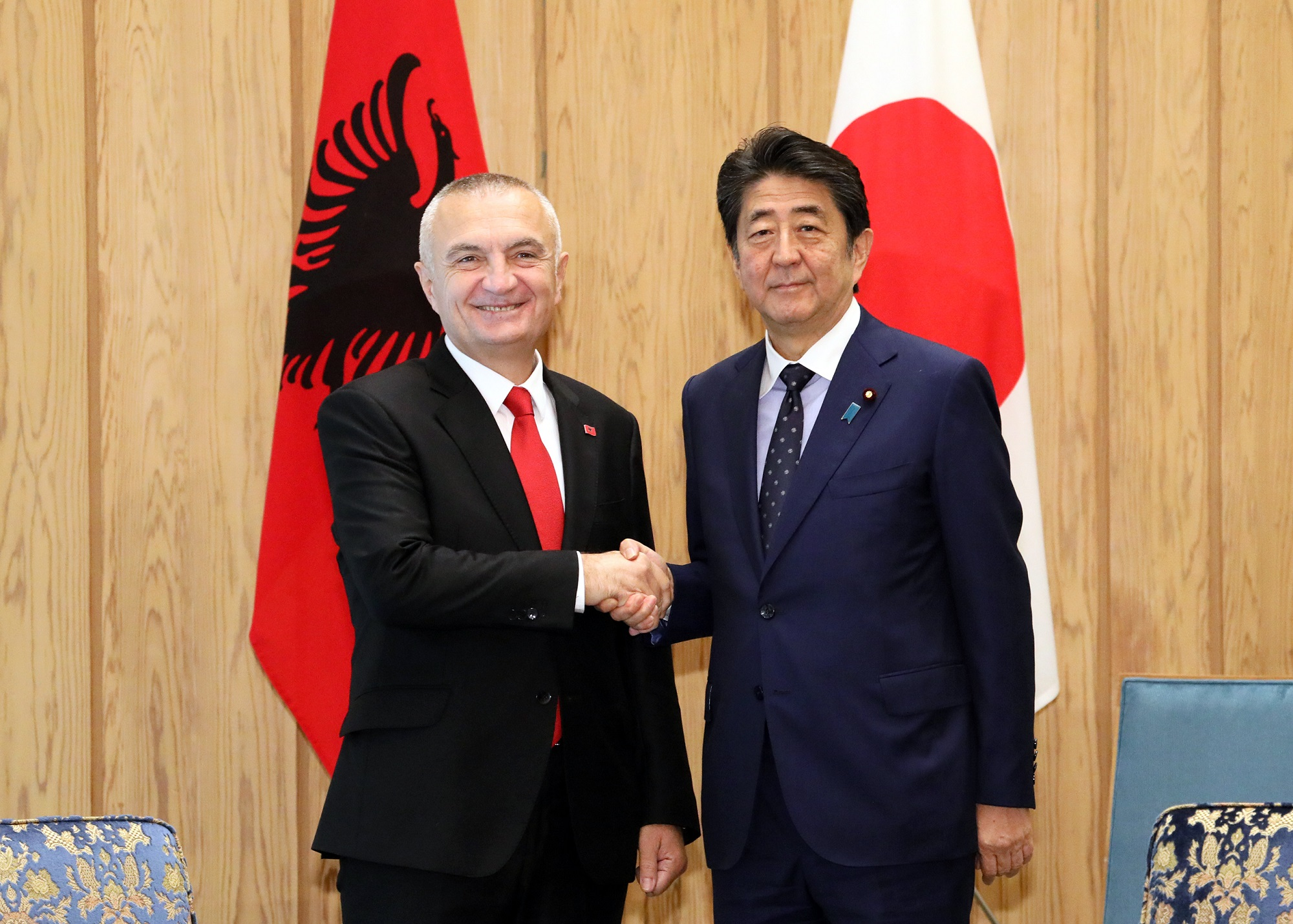
Japanese Prime Minister Shinzo Abe and Albanian President Ilir Meta at the Prime Minister's Official Residence in October 2019.

The Empire of Japan recognized the Albanian government in 1922 through the exchange of Notes between the Foreign Ministers of that time. The Albanian request of recognition by the Government of Japan, signed by Foreign Minister Fan Noli, dates back to 28 January 1922, meanwhile, the positive response, signed by the Foreign Minister of the Empire of Japan, Uchida Yasuya, is dated back to 18 April 1922.

On 20 June 1930, the First Commercial Treaty between the two countries was signed. In 1935 the Kingdom of Albania opened the Honorary Consulate in Osaka. After the World War II the relations were frozen and they were re-established in March 1981. In December 2005 the Embassy of the Republic of Albania was opened in Tokyo and the Japanese Government opened an embassy in Tirana.

== Japanese development aid ==
Japan's Official Development Assistance to Albania amounts 25.278 billion yen in total, or approximately 179 million EUR (as of May 2014)

- Grant Assistance: 4.98 billion yen
  - Yen Loans: 18.092 billion yen
  - Technical Cooperation: 2.206 billion yen

== Bilateral agreements ==
The two countries have signed more than 15 bilateral agreements and most of them are focused on the development of the economy of Albania. In September 2007, an agreement was reached on visa abolition of diplomatic passports with Japan and it entered into force in October 2007.

On 22 February 2023, the Prime Ministers of both countries held a Summit Meeting in Japan.

== See also ==
- Foreign relations of Albania
- Foreign relations of Japan
