= Albania–Mexico relations =

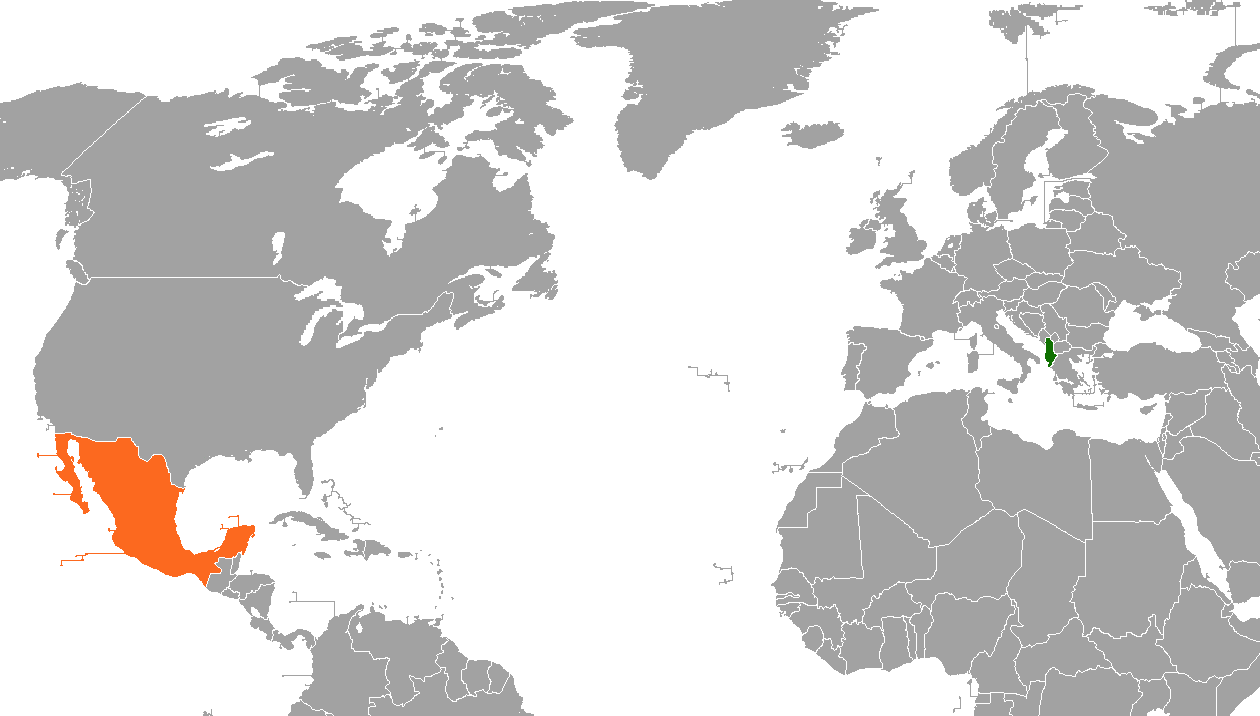

- Albania: Mexico

The nations of Albania and Mexico established diplomatic relations in 1974. Both nations are members of the United Nations.

== History ==
Albania and Mexico established diplomatic relations on the 15th of October 1974. That same year, Mexico opened an embassy in Tirana, however, the embassy was closed in 1979.

In February 2009, Mexican Foreign Undersecretary, Lourdes Aranda, received her counterpart, Edith Harxhi, with the purpose of reviewing the state of the bilateral relationship between both nations. In 2011, Albania's Deputy Prime Minister and Minister of Foreign Affairs, Edmond Haxhinasto, visited Mexico and met with Foreign Secretary Patricia Espinosa.

In 2024, both nations celebrated 50 years of diplomatic relations.

== Bilateral Agreements ==
Both nations have signed an Agreement on Establishing a Committee on Cultural Exchange (1989) and a Memorandum of Political Consultations between both nations Foreign Ministries (2011).

== Trade ==
In 2023, trade between Albania and Mexico totaled US$10.2 million. Albania's main exports to Mexico include: motors and generators, machine tools for working stone, parts and accessories for motor vehicles, clothing articles, footwear, alcohol, plastic, ferroalloys, and leather articles. Mexico's main exports to Albania include: tubes and pipes of iron or steel, beer, chocolate, machinery, antibiotics, and instruments and appliances used in medical sciences.

== Diplomatic missions ==
- Albania is accredited to Mexico from its embassy in Washington, D.C., United States.
- Mexico is accredited to Albania from its embassy in Rome, Italy and has an honorary consulate in Tirana.

== See also ==
- Foreign relations of Albania
- Foreign relations of Mexico
- List of ambassadors of Mexico to Albania
