= Albania–Canada relations =

- Albania: Canada

Albania and Canada are members of the NATO. Canada supports Accession of Albania to the EU.

== History ==
Both countries established diplomatic relations on 10 September 1987. In April 2001, the Albanian embassy was opened for the first time in Ottawa. This act helped in strengthening the relations between Canada and Albania. The year 2012 was named as "Year of Albania" in Canada, on the occasion of the 100th anniversary of Independence. Many activities were held by the Albanian community in Canada, which highlighted the friendship and ties between the countries.

== Relations and cooperation ==
Canada's exports to Albania in 2013 amounted to $36.84 million, with machinery, iron and steel products, animal products and tools counting among the top exports. Canadian imports from Albania totaled $6.37 million, mainly in footwear, iron and steel products, apparel and grain.

== Resident diplomatic missions ==
- Albania maintains an embassy in Ottawa.
- Canada maintains a consulate in Tirana.
- Current Canadian Ambassador to Albania is Elissa Golberg
- Current Albanian Ambassador to Canada is Artemis Malo

== See also ==
- Foreign relations of Albania
- Foreign relations of Canada
- Albanian Canadians
