= Albania–Australia relations =

Bilateral relations between Australia and Albania

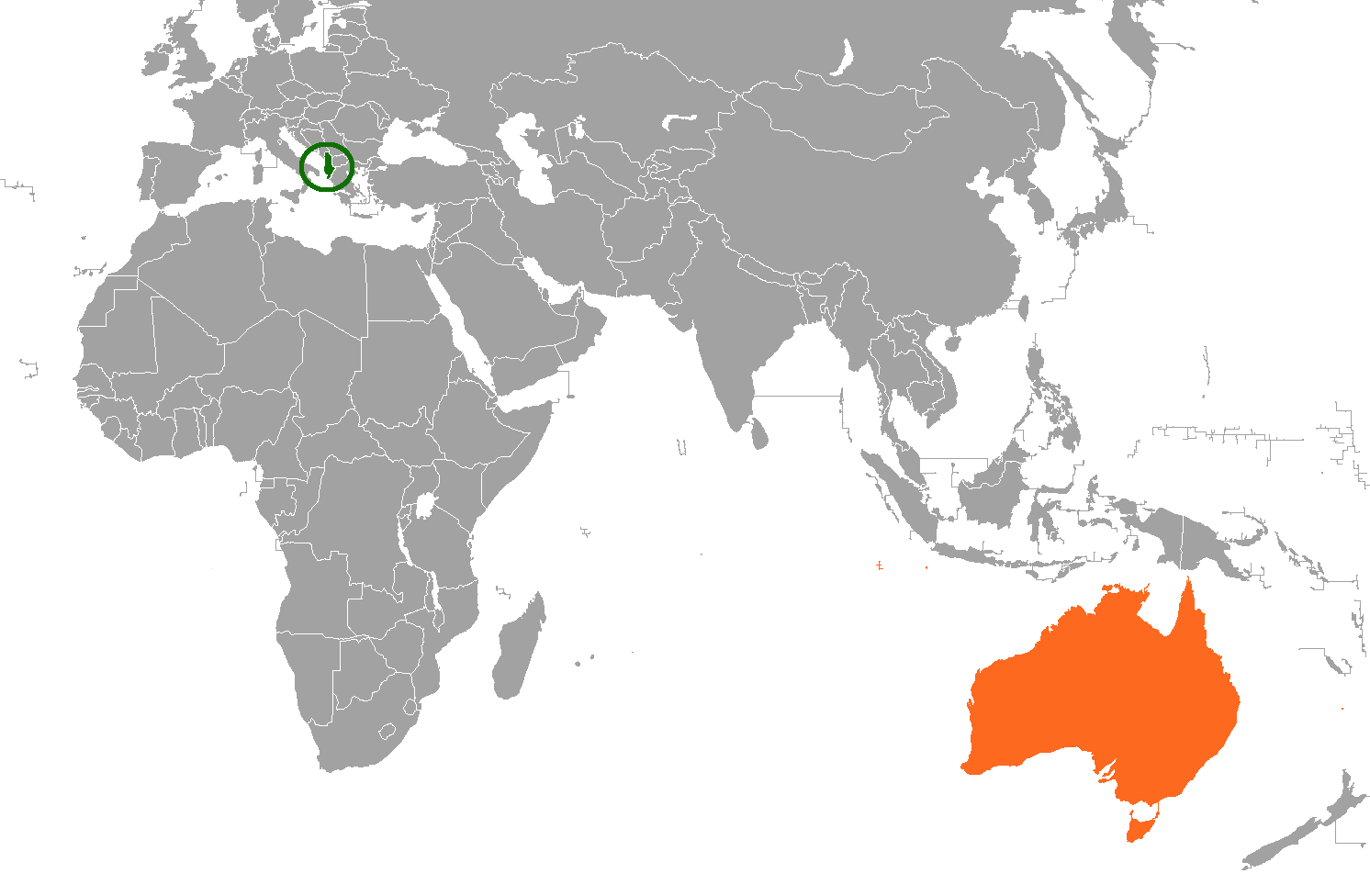

- Albania: Australia

Foreign relations exist between Australia and Albania. Albania has a resident ambassador in Canberra, whereas Australia has a non resident ambassador in Italy.

Prime Minister Anthony Albanese's appointment as Prime Minister in Australia following the 2022 Australian federal election made Albanian headlines, due to his last name 'Albanese' translating to 'Albanian' in Italian. His father was an Italian man who met his mother during an overseas trip in the 1960s, but whom Albanese did not meet until 2009.

The first visit between Albania and Australia occurred in April 2012 when the assistant minister for foreign affairs Richard Marles met with the Albanian prime minister, Sali Berisha. Later that year the Albanian foreign minister, Edmon Panariti visited Australia. Trade between the two countries is small bordering on insignificant, grossing just $3.4m in 2013. The Australian government has called for the protection of ethnic Albanians in Kosovo and Macedonia.

Australian news publications have noted social media manipulation occurring sourced from persons in Albania.

Migration from Albania to Australia has been noted to occur for at least four generations; migrants include members of Albania's Muslim community, some of whom have moved to Shepparton, Victoria; as featured in an Australian documentary film. Some migration stories to Australia have made local news headlines, including in The Chronicle, and AdelaideNow.

In recent years, deportations of some Albanian migrants from Australia has made Australian headlines after visa cancellations following criminal offending.

The pretender to the Albanian throne, King Leka, married the Australian schoolteacher Susan Cullen-Ward. The couple spent most of their married life living in Rhodesia and South Africa. Susan is the mother of the current pretender to the Albanian throne, Leka Zogu.

== Resident diplomatic missions ==
- Albania has an embassy in Canberra.
- Australia is accredited to Albania from its embassy in Rome, Italy.

== See also ==
- Foreign relations of Albania
- Foreign relations of Australia
