= Manuel Y. de Negri =

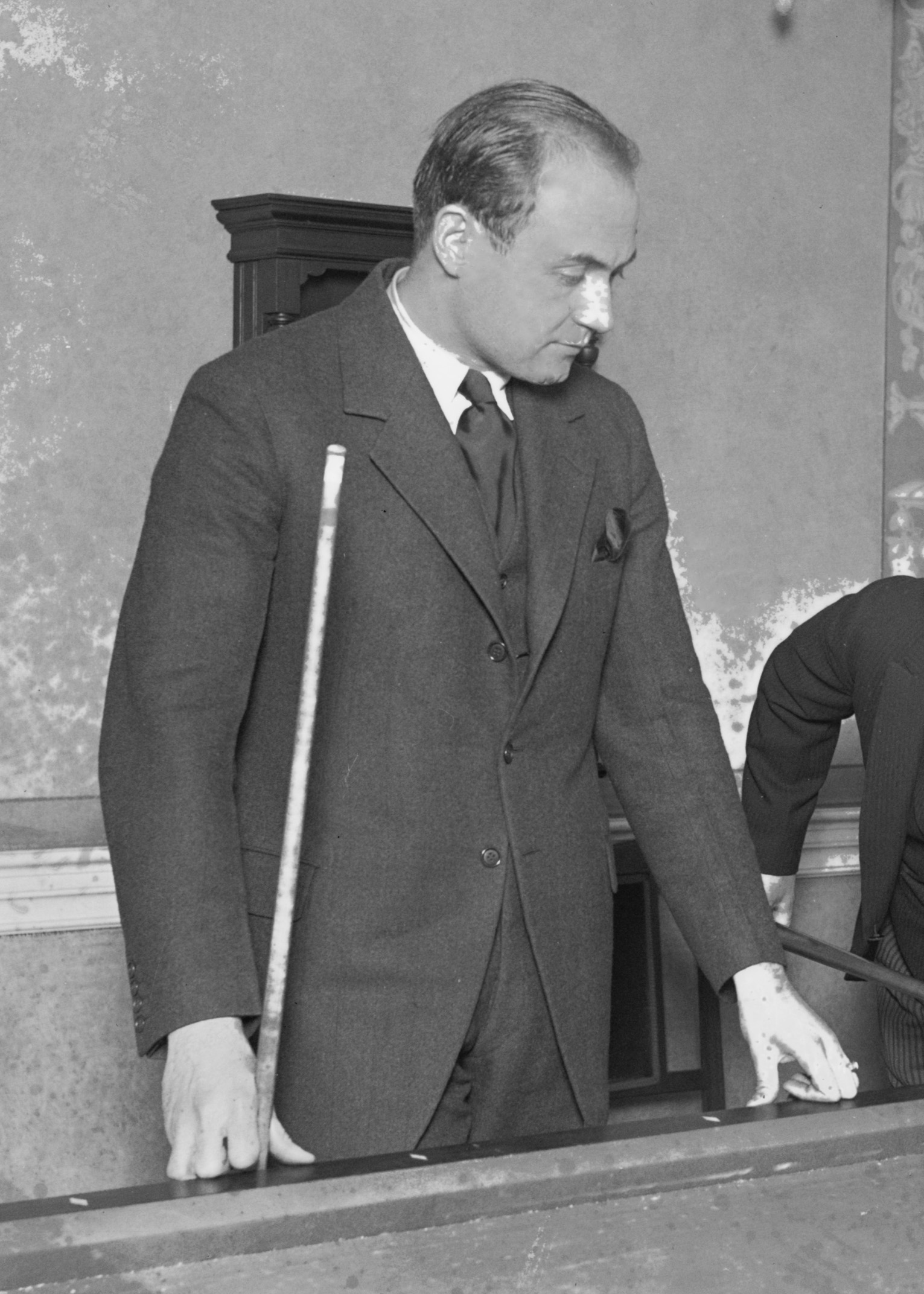
- De Negri in 1925

Ambassador of Mexico to Uruguay
- In office 29 January 1959 – 31 January 1965
- Preceded by: José Cayetano Valadés
- Succeeded by: Federico Antonio Mariscal Abascal

Personal details
- Born: Manuel Yberri de Negri
- Education: Saint Mary's College of California

Manuel Yberri de Negri was a Mexican diplomat who served as ambassador of Mexico to Uruguay (1959–1965). He also served as Envoy Extraordinary and Minister Plenipotentiary to Hungary (1932–1933), Italy (1932–1933), Denmark (1933–1935), El Salvador (1935–1940), Nicaragua (1937), Honduras (1937–1940), Uruguay (1939–1940) and Czechoslovakia (1946–1948).

On 8 March 1940, he requested permission to receive the Great Cross of Dannebrog from Denmark and the Order of Merit from Chile.

While De Negri was serving in Czechoslovakia, a diplomat of the British Foreign Office described him, in a confidential report written on 16 May 1946, as: "A career diplomat who has served in many posts, having spent the last ten years on the River Plate. Speaks excellent English and appears cultivated and knowledgeable. His lively wife is Chilean by birth." The report, apparently amended in 1948, also describes his reaction to the 1948 Czechoslovak coup d'état: "M. De Nigri and his wife left for Mexico soon after the February coup and gave out that they hoped not to come back. He has, however, now returned to his post."
