= China–Albania Friendship Association =

Albania friendship associations

The China–Albania Friendship Association was an organization based in China, with the aim of strengthening relations between the People's Republic of China and the People's Republic of Albania. The two states had a common position of denouncing 'revisionism' in the Soviet Union after the 20th Congress of the Communist Party of the Soviet Union. As of 1961, Chiang Nan-Hsiang was the president of the Association.

== See also ==
- Sino-Albanian split
