= Albania–India relations =

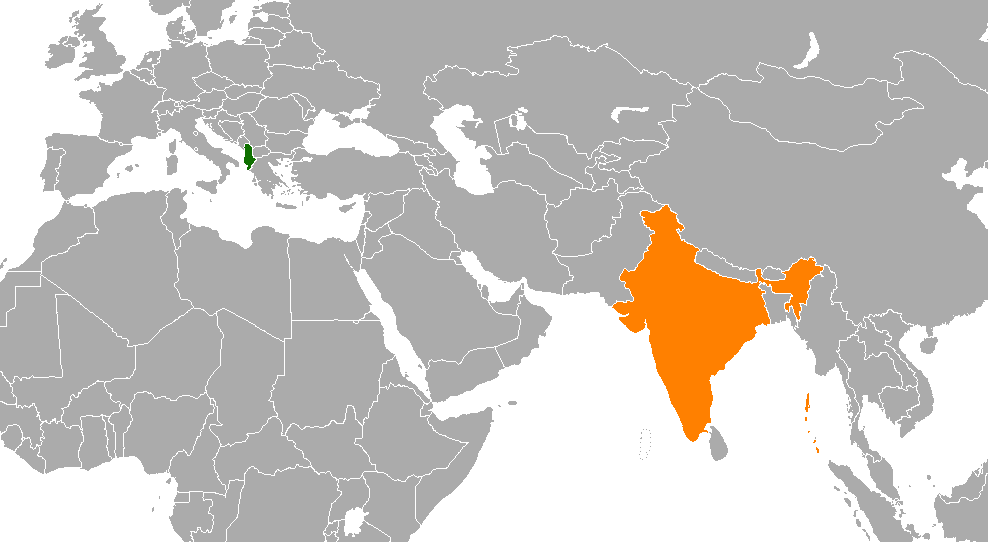
- Albania: India

Diplomatic mission
- Honorary Consuls: Embassy of India, Bucharest

Envoy
- Honorary Consul: Ambassador Rahul Shrivastava

Albania–India relations are the international relations that exist between Albania and India.

The Embassy of India in Albania was opened in August 2024. Albania maintains two honorary consuls in Mumbai and Delhi.

== History ==
India and Albania established diplomatic relations in 1956. Albania had a Mission in New Delhi since early 2008 and the first Albanian Ambassador to India presented his credentials to the President in October 2010. The Mission was closed down in 2014. Government of India has opened a resident Mission in Albania in August 2024. Albanian Embassy in Beijing is currently accredited to India.

The first foreign office consultations between the two countries was held in February 2003 in Tirana. Albanian President Rexhep Meidani visited Kolkata in 1997 to attend the funeral of Mother Teresa. Lulzim Basha became the first Albanian Foreign Minister to visit India in December 2008.

On 27 November 2015 India and Albania abolished visas for diplomatic and service passports.

== Economic relations ==
Bilateral trade between Albania and India was negligible until the early 1990s. Bilateral trade between the two countries measured US$ 68.20 million in 2017-18, and declined to 59.70 million in 2018-19. The main commodities exported by India to Albania are ceramic products, articles of stone, plaster, cement, aluminum and aluminum products, coffee, tea, mate and spices, electrical machinery and equipment, organic chemicals, raw hides and skins, nuclear reactors, boilers, machinery and mechanical appliances, fish and crustaceans, mollusks, and plastics. The major commodities imported by India from Albania are iron and steel, salt, sulfur earths and stone, raw hides and skins (other than fur skins), leather, aluminum and aluminum articles, oil seeds and olea, footwear, electrical machinery and equipment, essential oils and resinoids, and plastics.

In Feb 2012, a venture of India Albania Trade Expo was held to experience the potential of outsourced jobs in India where the cost effectiveness of the Indian businesses was on focus and also to exploit the potential deals and ventures from the Albanian side. The Expo was treated as an international platform to about 300 Indian companies to explore the untapped markets of Albania to achieve the bilateral profits.

Albania and India signed a Double Taxation Avoidance Agreement in July 2013. In January 2015, India and Albania agreed to boost cooperation with Indian investment in the oil and gas sector. A Memorandum of Collaboration (MoC) has also been signed in New Delhi where human resource development minister and petroleum and natural gas minister were present.

In November 2018, the Government of Albania awarded a contract to a consortium led by India Power Corporation Ltd. to build the country's first solar power station.

In February 2024, Albanian Foreign Minister Igli Hasani visited New Delhi to participate in the esteemed Raisina Dialogue. During his visit, Minister Hasani emphasized the strategic importance of Albania as a key location on the corridor that connects Europe to Asia, underscoring its potential role in facilitating trade, investment, and cultural exchanges between the two regions. He also pointed out that Albania is experiencing rapid economic growth, positioning itself as one of Europe’s fastest-growing economies.

Accompanied by an eight-member business delegation, Minister Hasani engaged in a productive meeting with External Affairs Minister S. Jaishankar on the sidelines of the conference. The two leaders discussed various strategies and initiatives aimed at enhancing economic collaboration between India and Albania. The dialogue included exploring opportunities for joint ventures, trade agreements, and investment partnerships that would benefit both nations. According to official reports, the bilateral trade volume between India and Albania reached an impressive USD 1.16 billion in the fiscal year 2023-24, reflecting a growing economic relationship that holds promise for further expansion in the future. It also broadened the scope of opening an embassy in New Delhi and a mission in Tirana.

On August 10, India opened its diplomatic resident mission in Tirana.

India and Albania conducted bilateral talks in Tirana on October 31, 2024. The Indian delegation was headed by Shri Arun Kumar Sahu, Additional Secretary for Central Europe at the Ministry of External Affairs, while the Albanian side was led by H.E. Mr. Endrit Yzeiraj, Deputy Minister for Europe and Foreign Affairs.

Throughout the discussions, both nations reviewed a range of bilateral, regional, and international matters. Key topics included political relations, trade, cultural connections, and interactions between their populations.

The talks also addressed collaboration on various international issues, with both sides sharing insights on regional and global concerns of mutual significance.

Furthermore, the Additional Secretary met with H.E. Ms. Olta Manjani, Deputy Minister of Economy, Culture and Innovation in Albania. They focused on topics such as trade, investment opportunities, tourism, and enhancing cultural exchanges between their countries.

== Cultural relations ==
Mother Teresa, who became an Indian citizen in 1951, was Albanian. The Tirana airport is named in her honor.

Indian films are broadcast on Albanian television and a few Indian films have been shot in Albania. An Indian Council for Cultural Relations (ICCR) sponsored Manipuri dance troupe visited Albania in November 2012 and performed during the centenary celebrations of Albania's independence. An ICCR sponsored Mohiniyattam dance troupe led by Dr. Neena Prasad, and accompanied by musicians, visited Tirana and performed on 6 June 2019. The International Day of Yoga has been celebrated in Tirana annually since 2015. The 5th International Day of Yoga was celebrated at Selman Stermasi Stadium in Tirana on 17 June 2019.

Less than 100 Indians live in Albania as of February 2020. Most of them are employed as professionals in management positions in foreign-owned companies.
