= List of diplomatic missions of the Czech Republic =

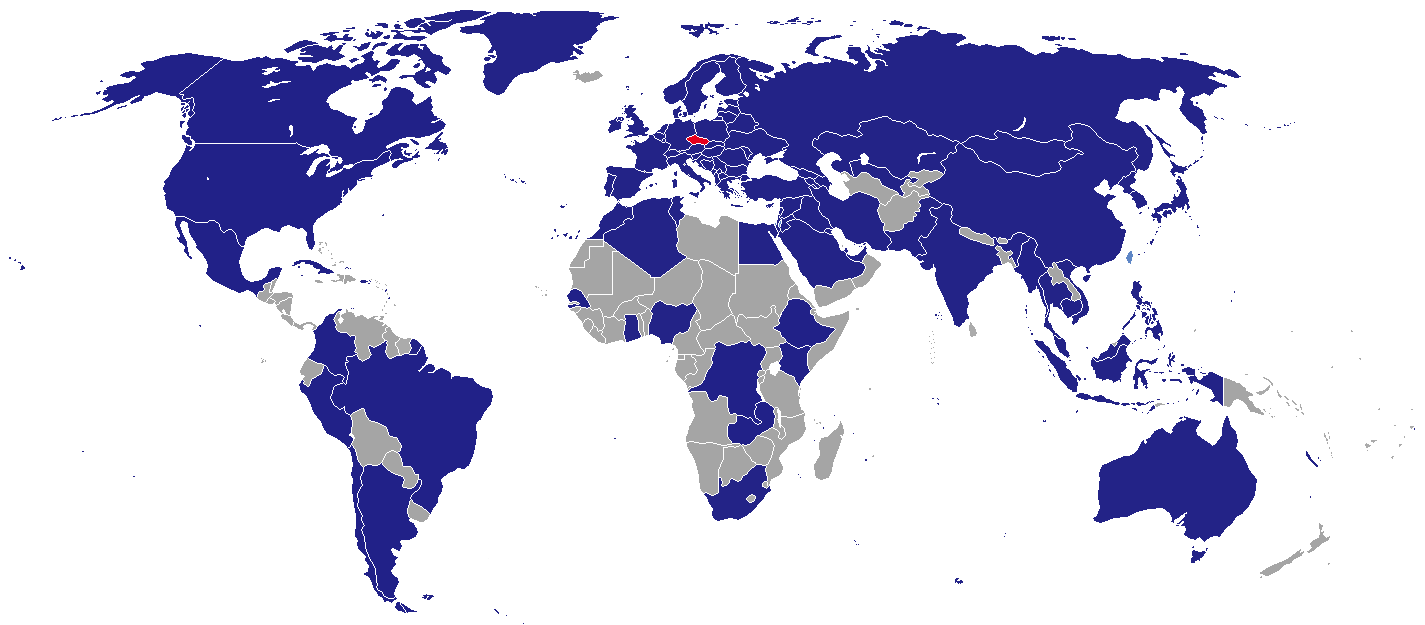
Czech diplomatic missions

The Czech Republic, also known as Czechia, has a wide network of diplomatic missions worldwide.

Excluded are honorary consulates and "Czech Centres", offices without diplomatic status responsible for promoting trade, tourism, and Czech culture abroad. On the other hand, the economic and cultural office in Taipei is included in this list, as it function's as the Czech Republic's de facto embassy to Taiwan.

== Current missions ==
=== Africa ===
Host country	Host city	Mission	Concurrent accreditation	Ref.
Algeria	Algiers	Embassy		
Congo-Kinshasa	Kinshasa	Embassy		
Egypt	Cairo	Embassy	Countries: Eritrea; Sudan	
Ethiopia	Addis Ababa	Embassy	Countries: Comoros; Djibouti; Seychelles; Somalia; South Sudan; Multilateral Organizations: African Union	
Ghana	Accra	Embassy	Countries: Burkina Faso; Ivory Coast; Liberia; Sierra Leone; Togo	
Kenya	Nairobi	Embassy	Countries: Burundi; Rwanda; Tanzania; Uganda; Multilateral Organizations: United Nations; United Nations Environment Programme; United Nations Human Settlements Programme	
Morocco	Rabat	Embassy	Countries: Mauritania	
Nigeria	Abuja	Embassy	Countries: Benin; Cameroon; Central African Republic; Chad; Congo-Brazzaville; Equatorial Guinea; Gabon; Niger; Multilateral Organizations: Economic Community of West African States (Note: Accredited as an observer mission.)	
Senegal	Dakar	Embassy	Countries: Gambia; Guinea; Guinea-Bissau; Mali	
South Africa	Pretoria	Embassy	Countries: Angola; Botswana; Eswatini; Lesotho; Madagascar; Mauritius; Mozambique; Namibia; Multilateral Organizations: Southern African Development Community	
Tunisia	Tunis	Embassy	Countries: Libya	
Zambia	Lusaka	Embassy	Countries: Malawi; Zimbabwe	

=== Americas ===
Host country	Host city	Mission	Concurrent accreditation	Ref.
Argentina	Buenos Aires	Embassy	Countries: Paraguay; Uruguay	
Brazil	Brasília	Embassy	Countries: Guyana; Suriname	
Brazil	São Paulo	Consulate-General	Countries: Guyana; Suriname	
Canada	Ottawa	Embassy		
Canada	Toronto	Consulate-General		
Chile	Santiago de Chile	Embassy	Countries: Bolivia	
Colombia	Bogotá	Embassy	Countries: Barbados; Costa Rica; Dominica; Grenada; Panama; Saint Kitts and Nevis; Saint Lucia; Saint Vincent and the Grenadines; Trinidad and Tobago; Venezuela	
Cuba	Havana	Embassy	Countries: Bahamas; Dominican Republic; Haiti	
Mexico	Mexico City	Embassy	Countries: Belize; El Salvador; Guatemala; Honduras; Nicaragua	
Peru	Lima	Embassy	Countries: Ecuador	
United States	Washington, D.C.	Embassy	Countries: Antigua and Barbuda; Jamaica; Multilateral Organizations: Organization of American States	
United States	Chicago	Consulate-General	Countries: Antigua and Barbuda; Jamaica; Multilateral Organizations: Organization of American States	
United States	Los Angeles	Consulate-General	Countries: Antigua and Barbuda; Jamaica; Multilateral Organizations: Organization of American States	
United States	Miami	Consulate-General	Countries: Antigua and Barbuda; Jamaica; Multilateral Organizations: Organization of American States	
United States	New York City	Consulate-General	Countries: Antigua and Barbuda; Jamaica; Multilateral Organizations: Organization of American States	

=== Asia ===
Host country	Host city	Mission	Concurrent accreditation	Ref.
Armenia	Yerevan	Embassy		
Azerbaijan	Baku	Embassy		
Cambodia	Phnom Penh	Embassy		
China	Beijing	Embassy		
China	Shanghai	Consulate-General		
Georgia	Tbilisi	Embassy		
India	New Delhi	Embassy	Countries: Bangladesh; Bhutan; Maldives; Nepal; Sri Lanka	
India	Mumbai	Consulate-General	Countries: Bangladesh; Bhutan; Maldives; Nepal; Sri Lanka	
Indonesia	Jakarta	Embassy	Countries: Brunei; Timor-Leste; Multilateral Organizations: Association of Southeast Asian Nations	
Iran	Tehran	Embassy		
Iraq	Baghdad	Embassy		
Iraq	Erbil	Consulate-General		
Israel	Tel Aviv	Embassy		
Japan	Tokyo	Embassy		
Jordan	Amman	Embassy		
Kazakhstan	Astana	Embassy	Countries: Kyrgyzstan	
Kuwait	Kuwait City	Embassy		
Lebanon	Beirut	Embassy		
Mongolia	Ulaanbaatar	Embassy		
Malaysia	Kuala Lumpur	Embassy	Countries: Kiribati; Papua New Guinea; Tuvalu	
Myanmar	Yangon	Embassy		
North Korea	Pyongyang	Embassy		
Pakistan	Islamabad	Embassy		
Palestine	Ramallah	Representative office		
Philippines	Manila	Embassy	Countries: Marshall Islands; Micronesia; Nauru; Palau	
Qatar	Doha	Embassy		
Republic of China (Taiwan)	Taipei	Economic and Cultural Office		
Saudi Arabia	Riyadh	Embassy	Countries: Bahrain; Oman; Yemen	
Singapore	Singapore	Embassy		
South Korea	Seoul	Embassy		
Syria	Damascus	Embassy		
Thailand	Bangkok	Embassy	Countries: Laos	
Turkey	Ankara	Embassy		
Turkey	Istanbul	Consulate-General		
Uzbekistan	Tashkent	Embassy	Countries: Tajikistan; Turkmenistan	
United Arab Emirates	Abu Dhabi	Embassy	Multilateral Organizations: International Renewable Energy Agency	
Vietnam	Hanoi	Embassy		

=== Europe ===
Host country	Host city	Mission	Concurrent accreditation	Ref.
Albania	Tirana	Embassy		
Austria	Vienna	Embassy		
Belarus	Minsk	Embassy		
Belgium	Brussels	Embassy		
Bosnia and Herzegovina	Sarajevo	Embassy		
Bulgaria	Sofia	Embassy		
Bulgaria	Burgas	Consular agency		
Croatia	Zagreb	Embassy		
Cyprus	Nicosia	Embassy		
Denmark	Copenhagen	Embassy		
Estonia	Tallinn	Embassy		
Finland	Helsinki	Embassy		
France	Paris	Embassy	Countries: Monaco; International Organizations: UNESCO	
Germany	Berlin	Embassy		
Germany	Dresden	Consulate-General		
Germany	Munich	Consulate-General		
Germany	Düsseldorf	Consulate-General		
Greece	Athens	Embassy		
Holy See (Note: The Czech Embassy to the Holy See is located outside Vatican territory in Rome.)	Rome	Embassy	Countries: San Marino; Sovereign entity: Sovereign Military Order of Malta	
Hungary	Budapest	Embassy		
Ireland	Dublin	Embassy		
Italy	Rome	Embassy	Countries: Malta; International Organizations: Food and Agriculture Organization; International Fund for Agricultural Development; World Food Programme	
Italy	Milan	Consulate-General	Countries: Malta; International Organizations: Food and Agriculture Organization; International Fund for Agricultural Development; World Food Programme	
Kosovo	Pristina	Embassy		
Latvia	Riga	Embassy		
Luxembourg	Luxembourg City	Embassy		
Lithuania	Vilnius	Embassy		
Moldova	Chișinău	Embassy		
Montenegro	Podgorica	Embassy		
Netherlands	The Hague	Embassy	International Organizations: Organisation for the Prohibition of Chemical Weapons	
North Macedonia	Skopje	Embassy		
Norway	Oslo	Embassy	Countries: Iceland	
Poland	Warsaw	Embassy		
Portugal	Lisbon	Embassy	Countries: Cape Verde; São Tomé and Príncipe	
Romania	Bucharest	Embassy		
Russia	Moscow	Embassy		
Serbia	Belgrade	Embassy		
Slovakia	Bratislava	Embassy		
Slovenia	Ljubljana	Embassy		
Spain	Madrid	Embassy	Countries: Andorra	
Sweden	Stockholm	Embassy		
Switzerland	Bern	Embassy	Countries: Liechtenstein	
Ukraine	Kyiv	Embassy		
Ukraine	Lviv	Consulate-General		
United Kingdom	London	Embassy		
United Kingdom	Manchester	Consulate-General		

=== Oceania ===
Host country	Host city	Mission	Concurrent accreditation	Ref.
Australia	Canberra	Embassy	Countries: Cook Islands; Fiji; New Zealand; Samoa; Solomon Islands; Tonga; Vanuatu	
Australia	Sydney	Consulate-General	Countries: Cook Islands; Fiji; New Zealand; Samoa; Solomon Islands; Tonga; Vanuatu	

=== Multilateral organizations ===
Organization	Host city	Host country	Mission	Concurrent accreditation	Ref.
Council of Europe	Strasbourg	France	Permanent Representation		
European Union	Brussels	Belgium	Permanent Representation		
NATO	Brussels	Belgium	Permanent Delegation		
OECD	Paris	France	Permanent Delegation		
United Nations	New York City	United States	Permanent Mission		
United Nations	Geneva	Switzerland	Permanent Mission	Multilateral Organizations: Conference on Disarmament; World Health Organization; World Trade Organization	
United Nations	Vienna	Austria	Permanent Mission	Multilateral Organizations: OSCE; International Atomic Energy Agency; UNCITRAL; UNIDO; United Nations Office on Drugs and Crime	

== Gallery ==
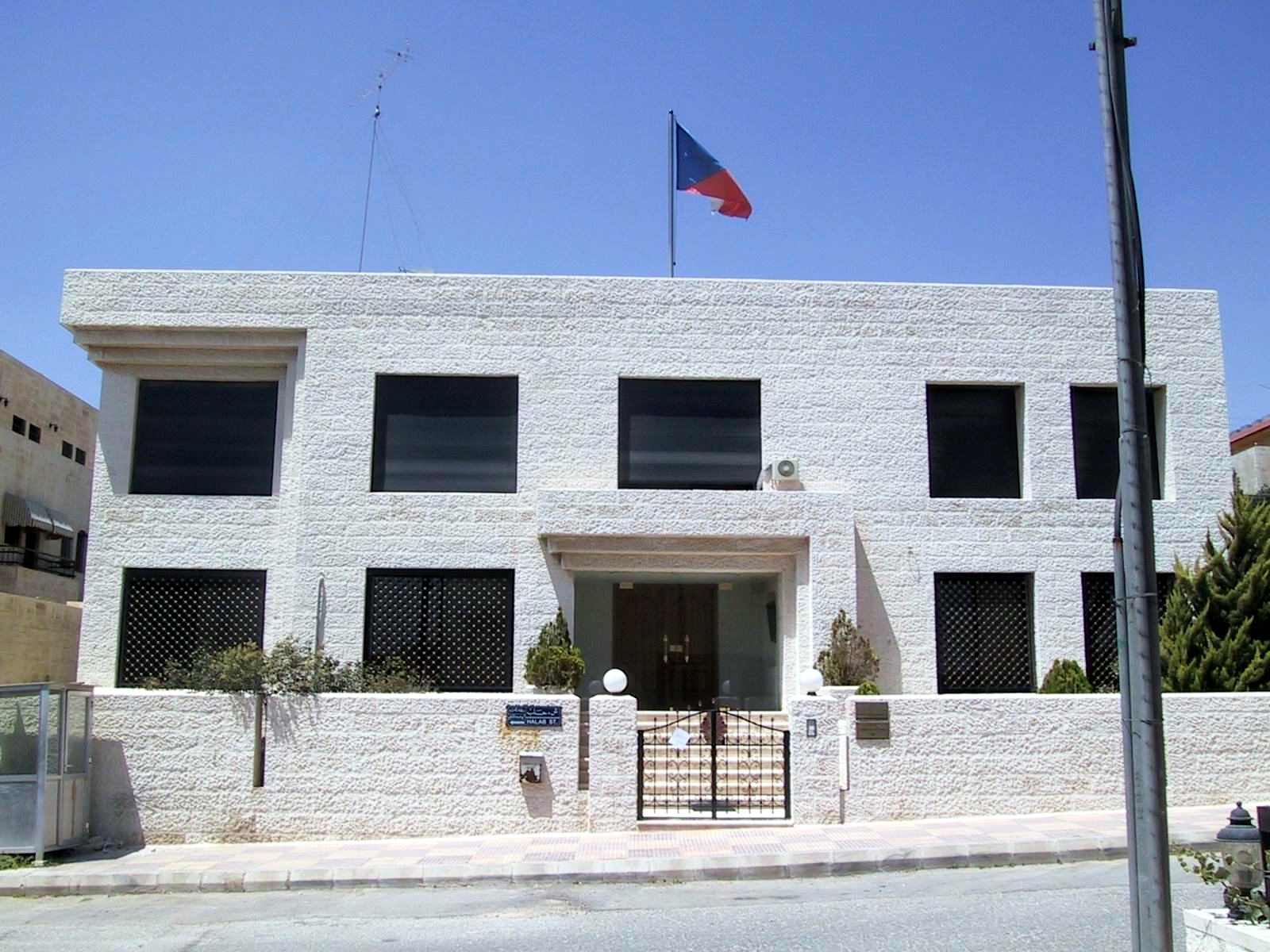
Embassy in Amman

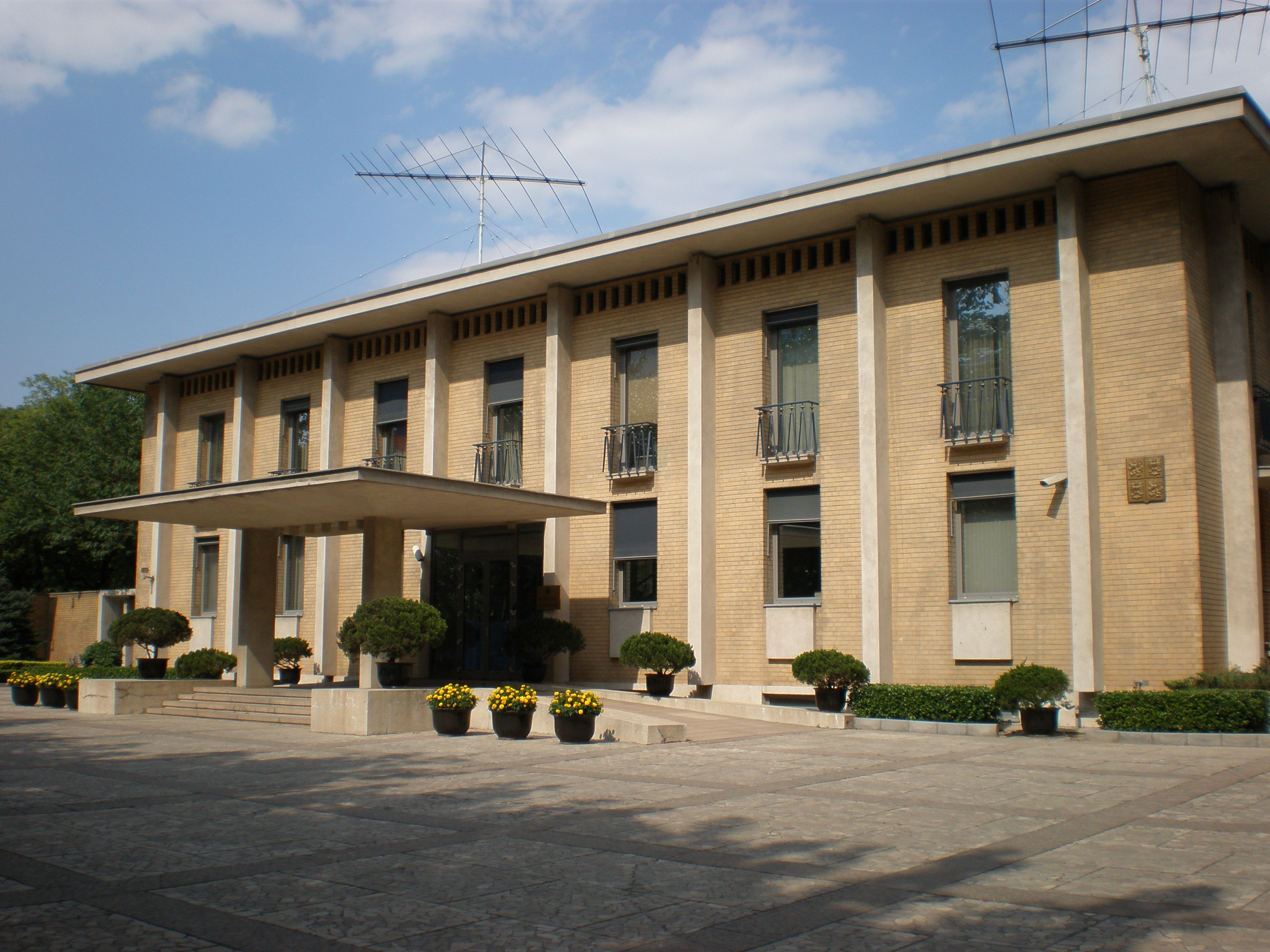
Embassy in Beijing

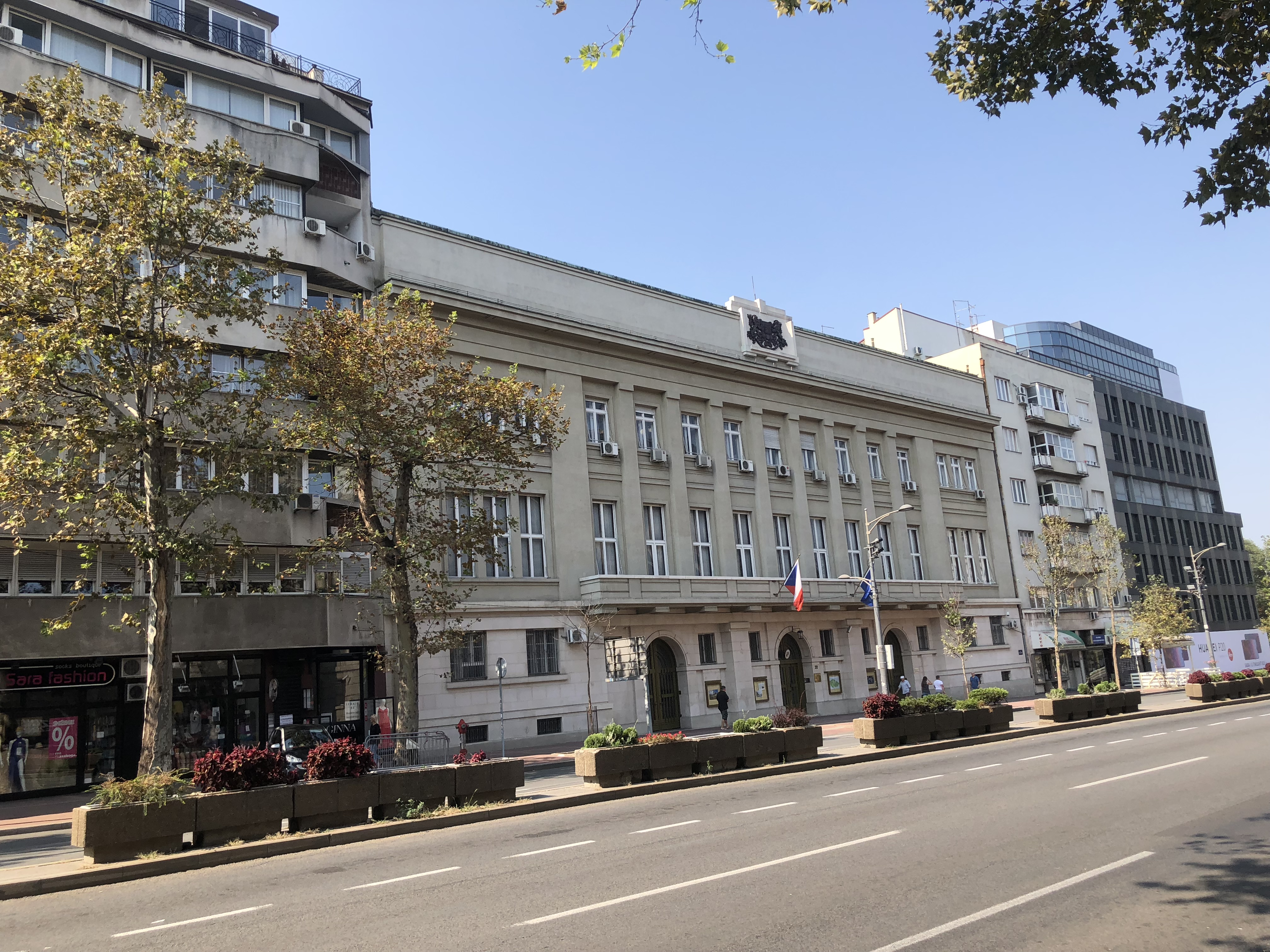
Embassy in Belgrade

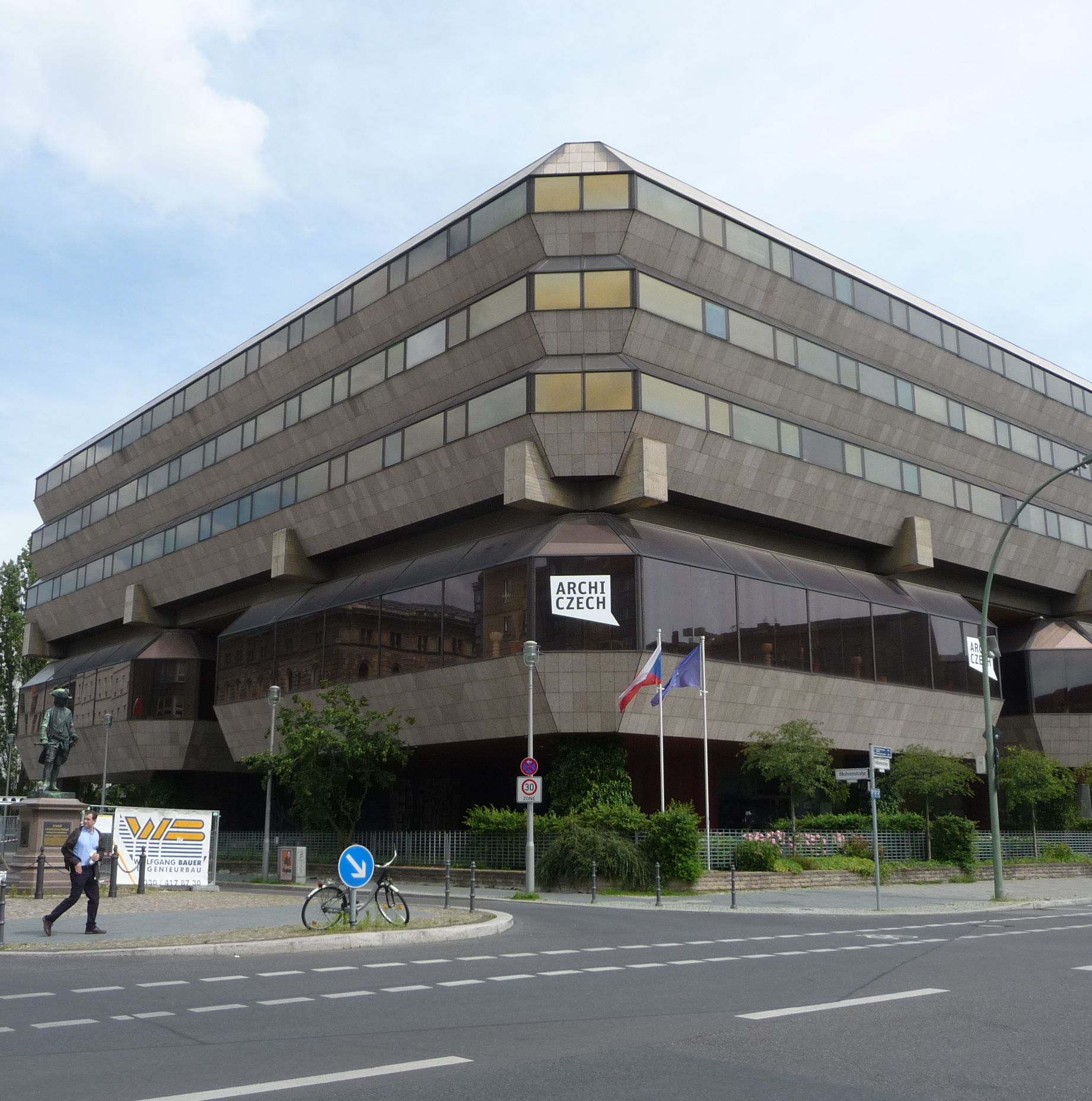
Embassy in Berlin

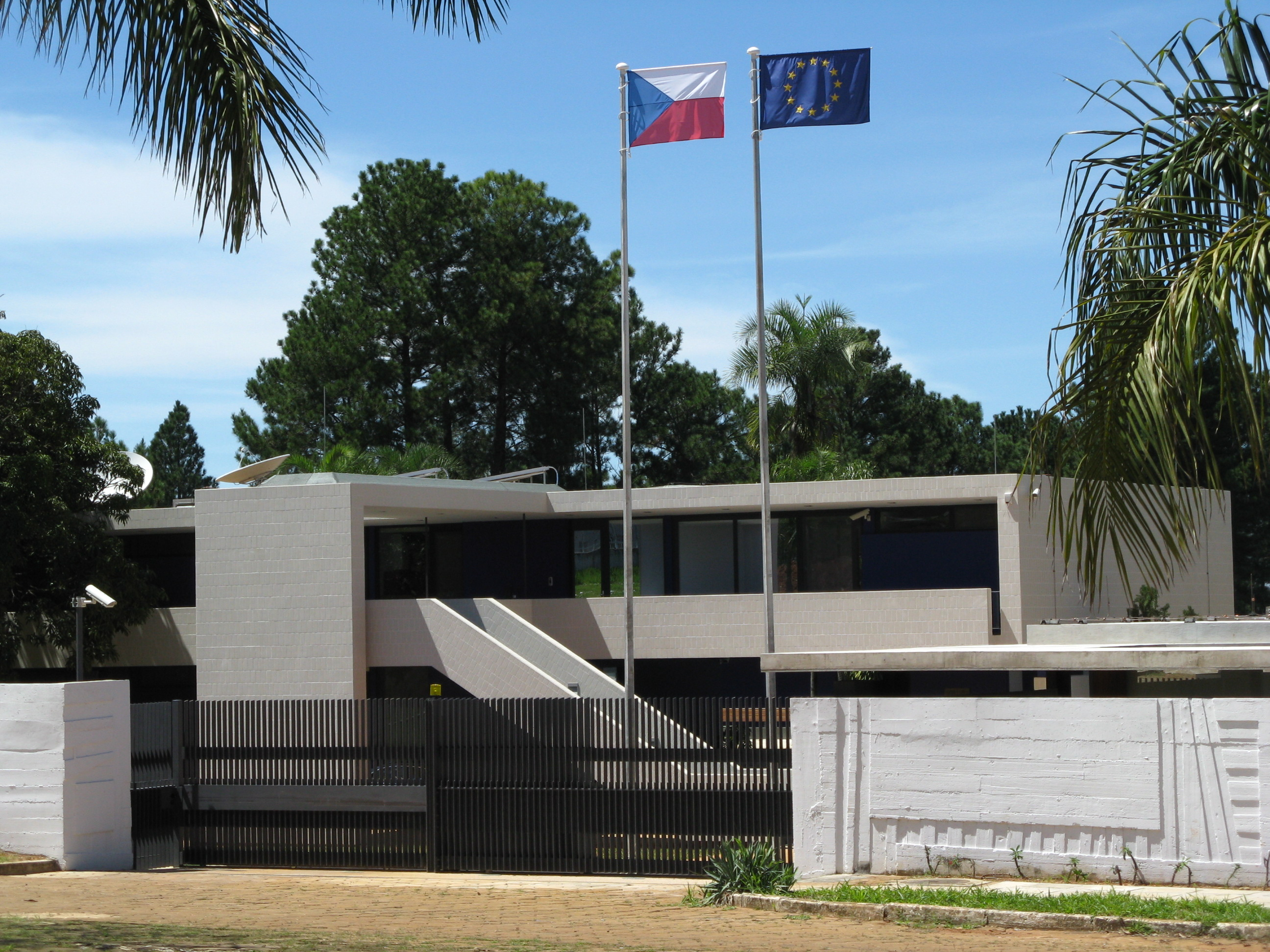
Embassy in Brasília

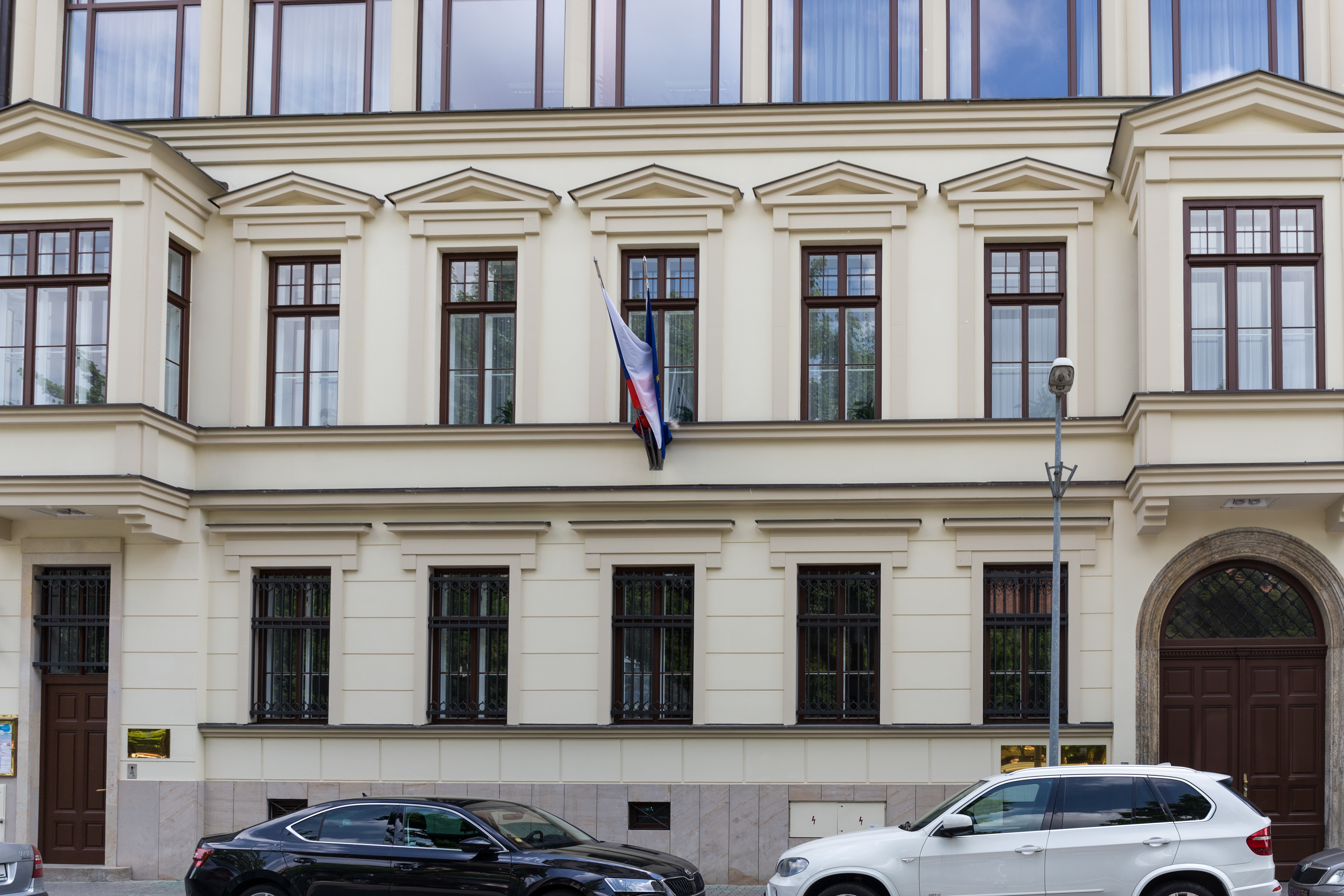
Embassy in Bratislava

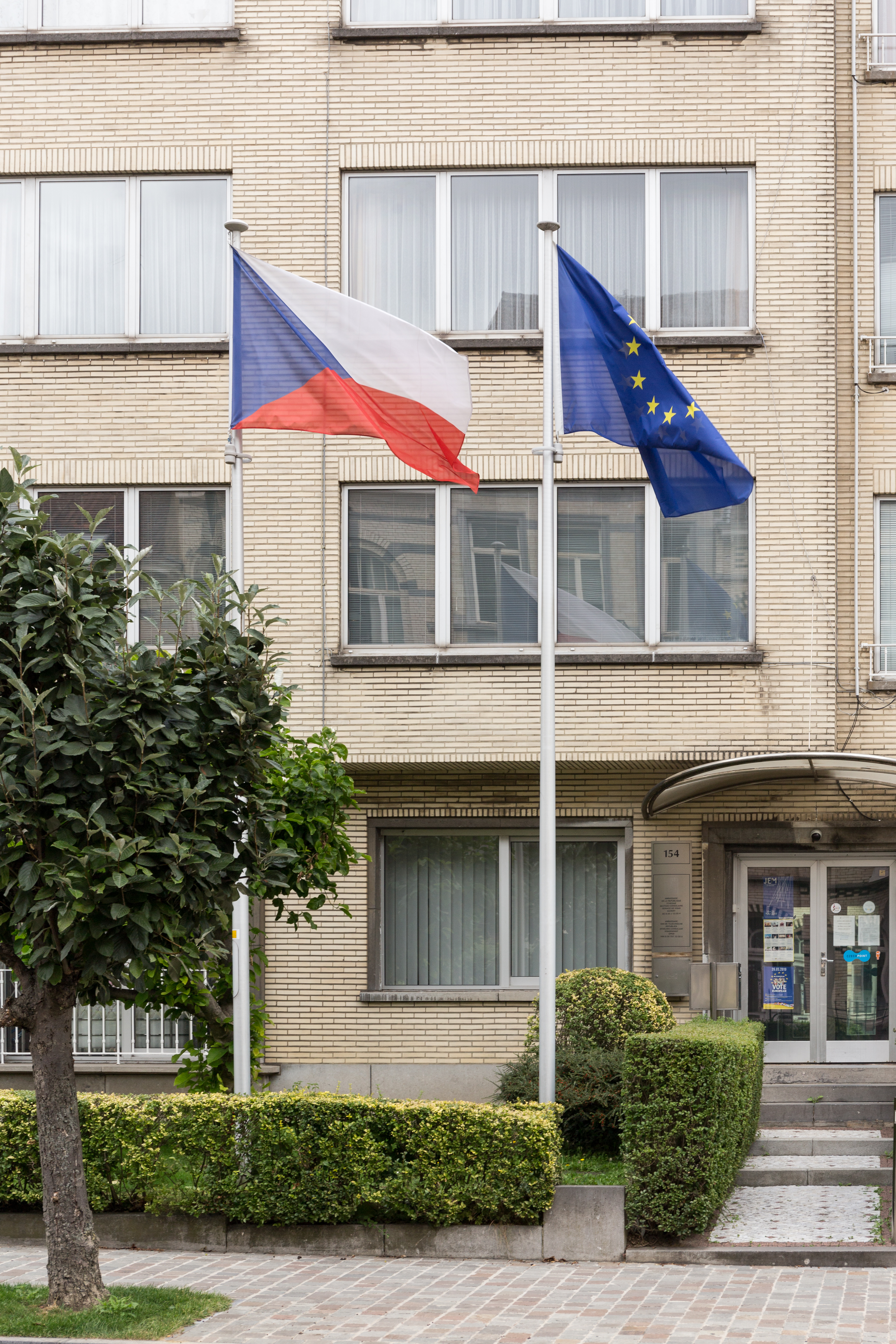
Embassy in Brussels

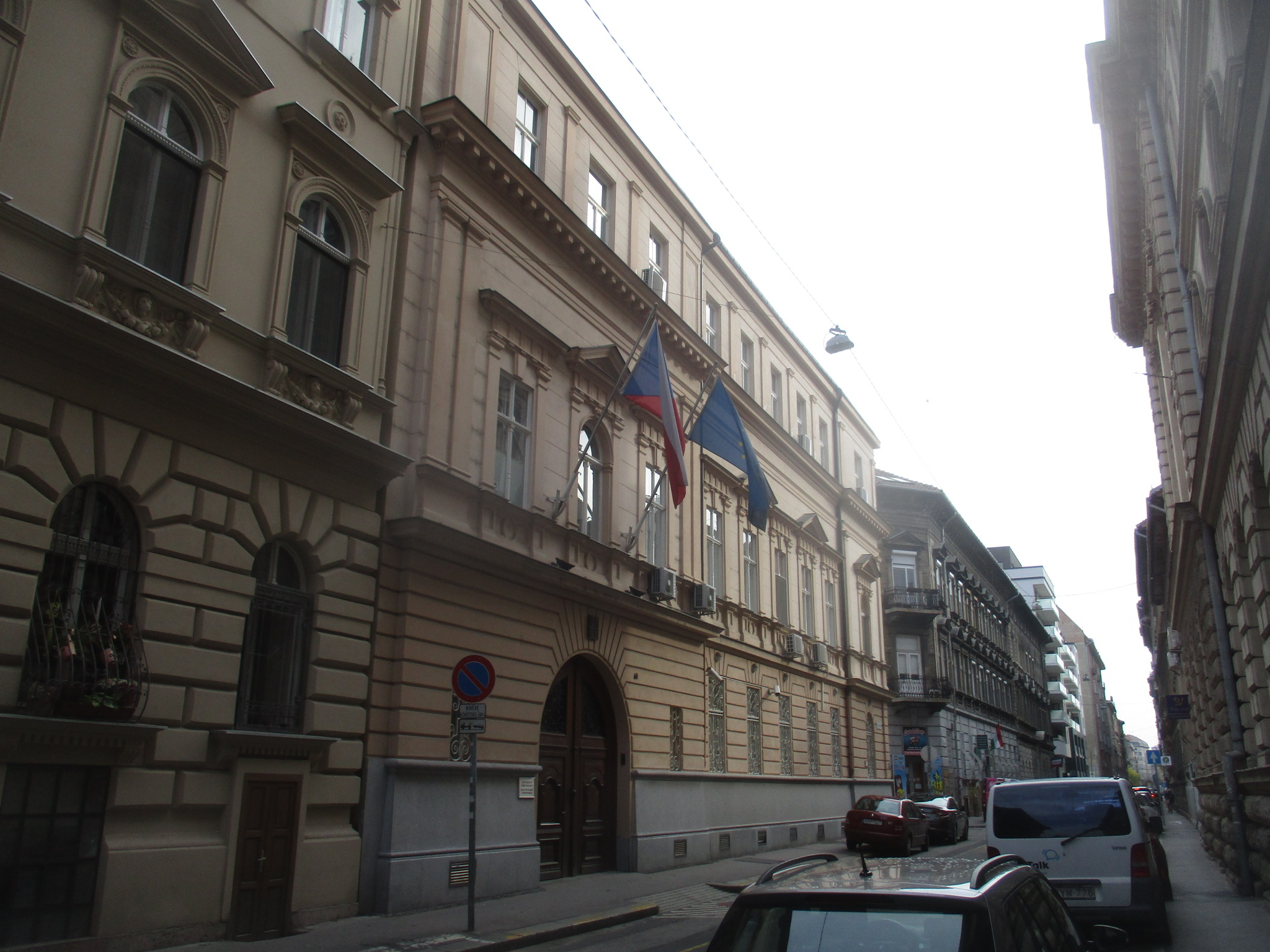
Embassy in Budapest

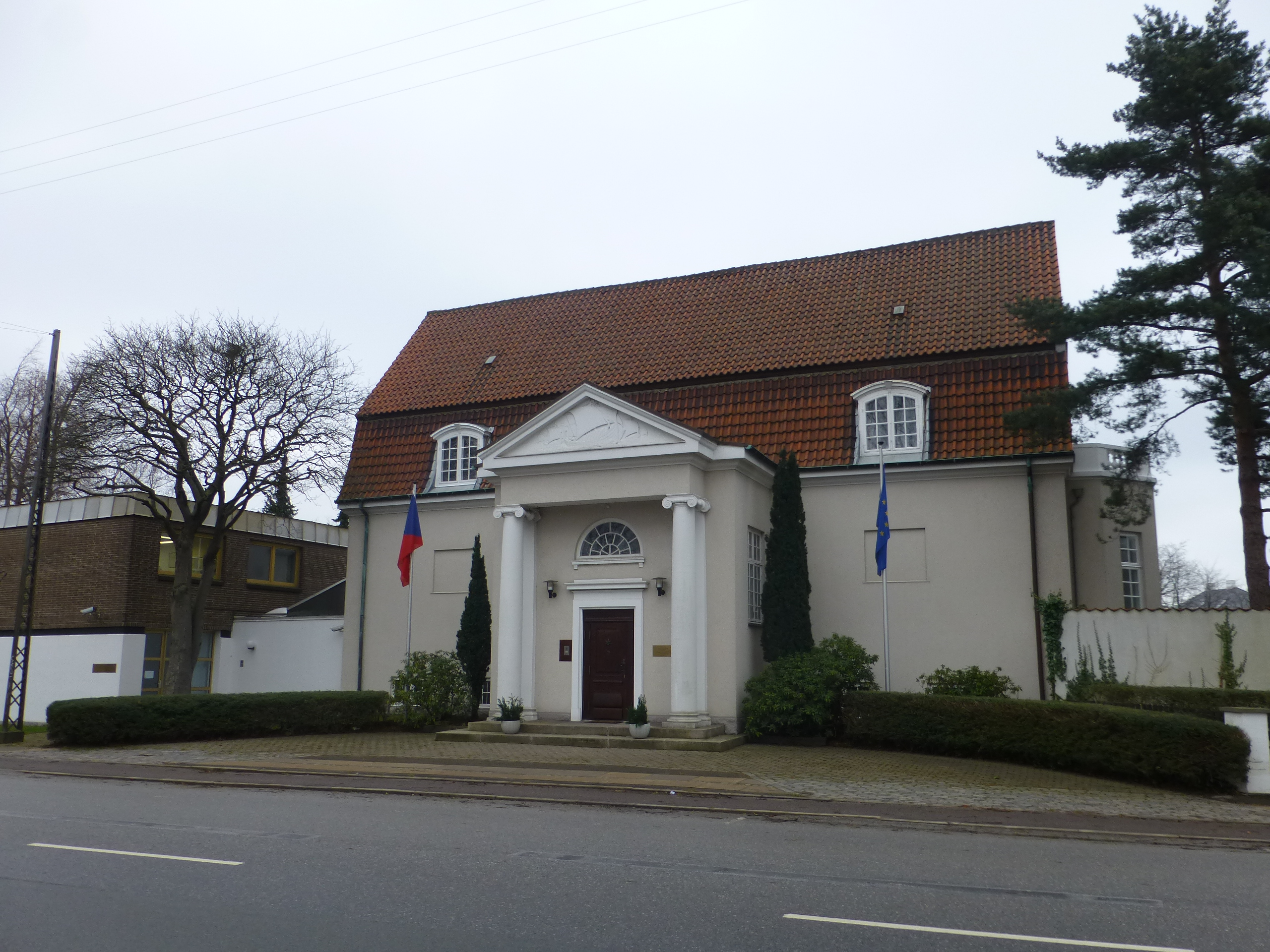
Embassy in Copenhagen

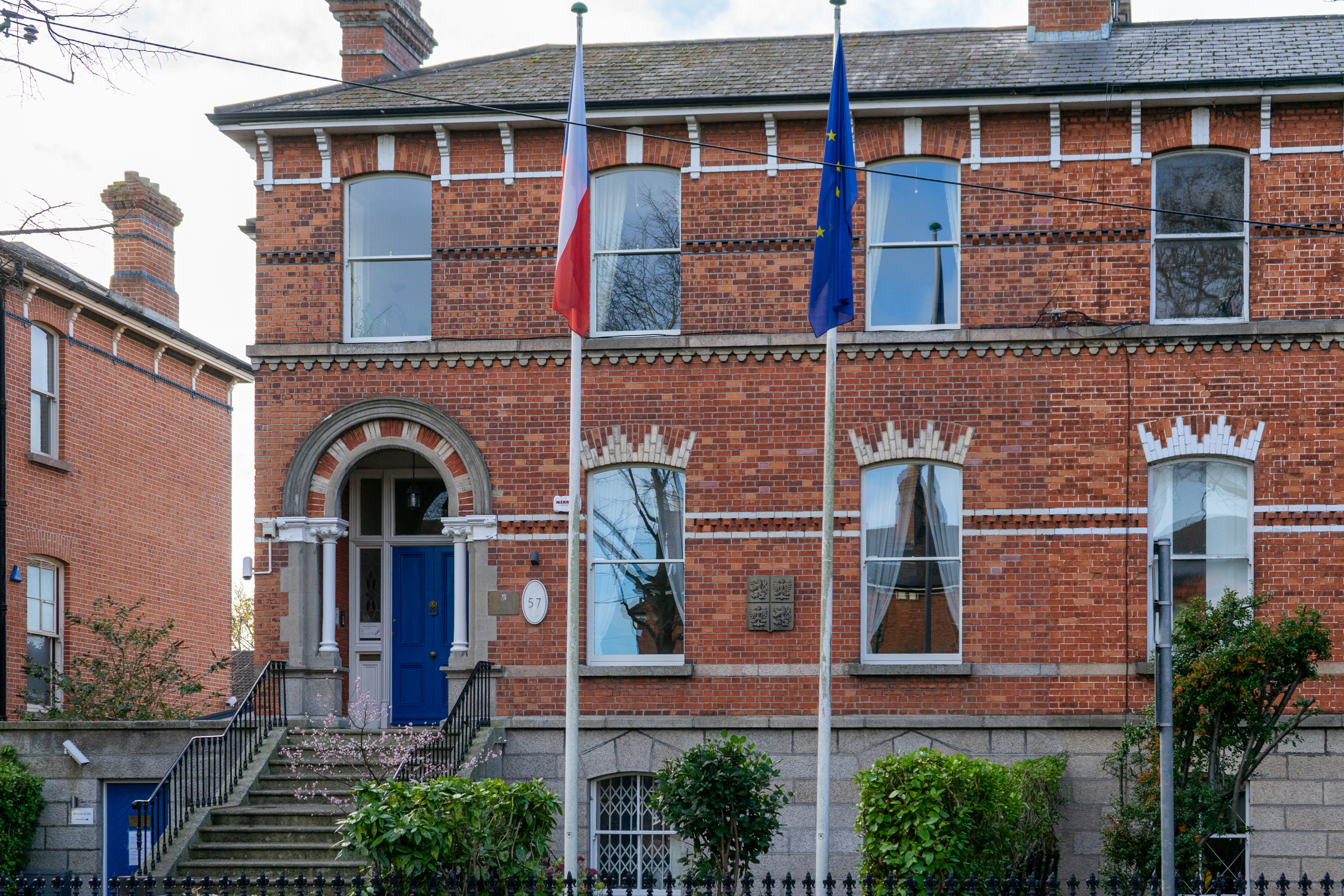
Embassy in Dublin

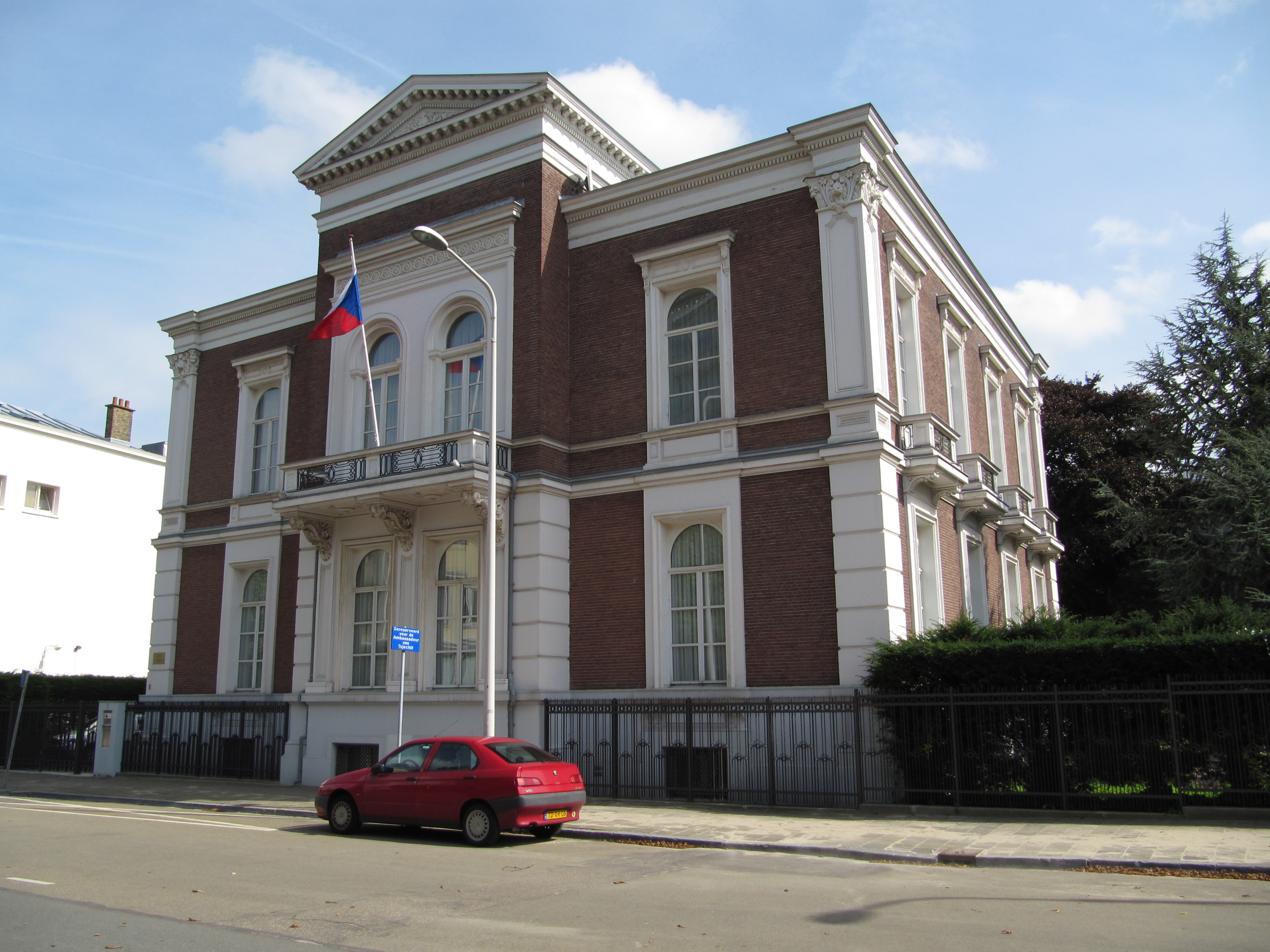
Embassy in The Hague

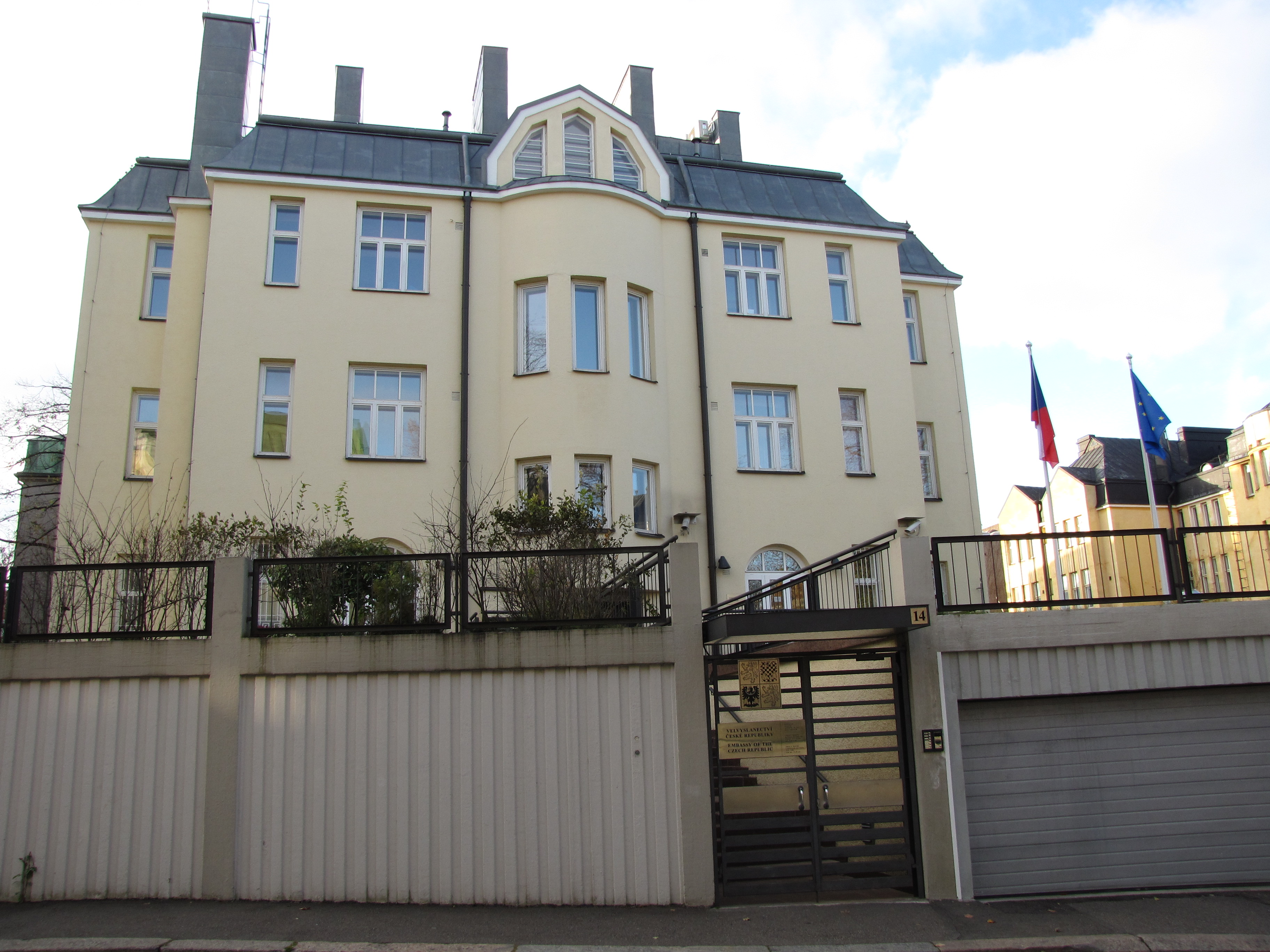
Embassy in Helsinki

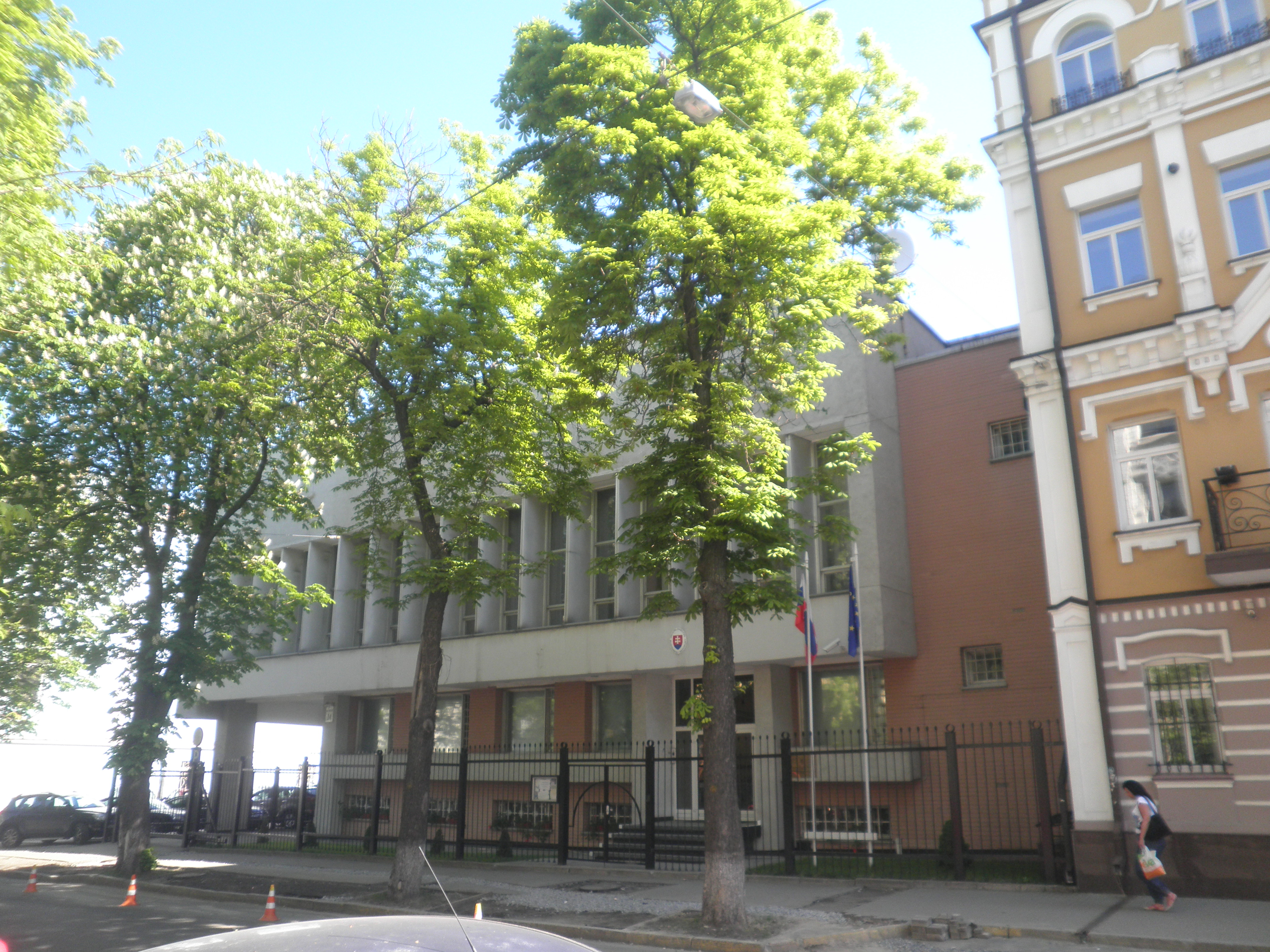
Embassy in Kyiv

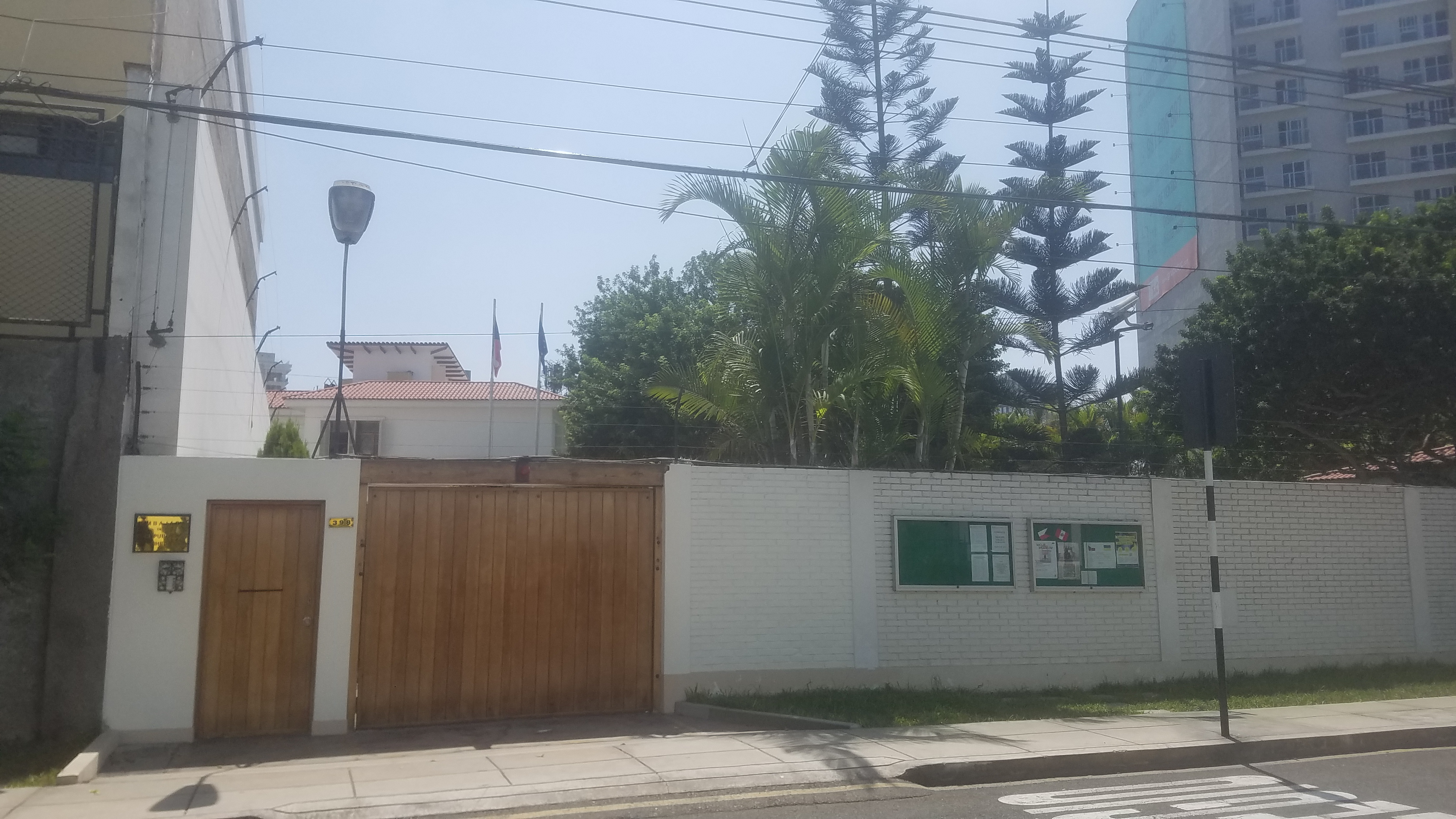
Embassy in Lima

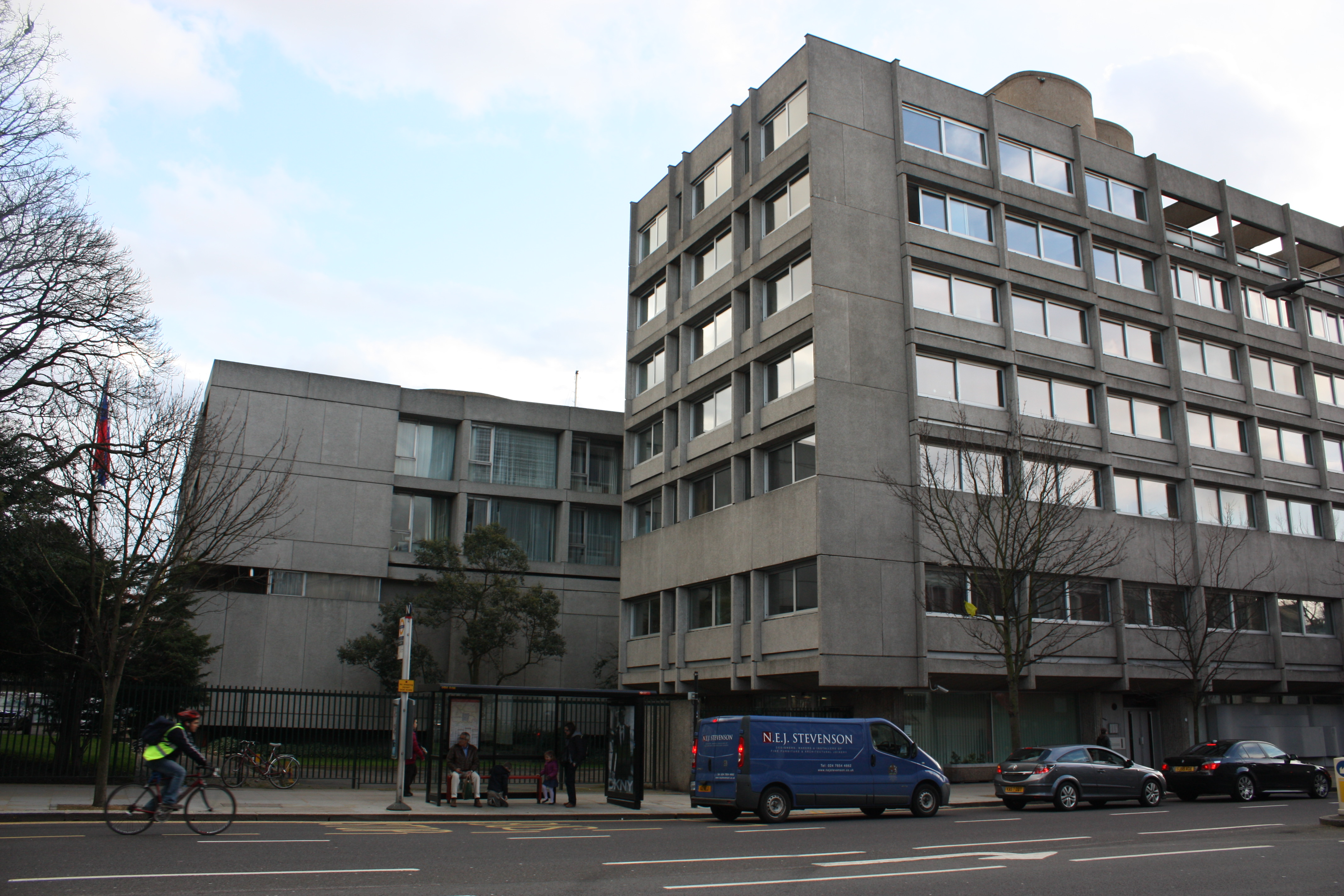
Embassy in London

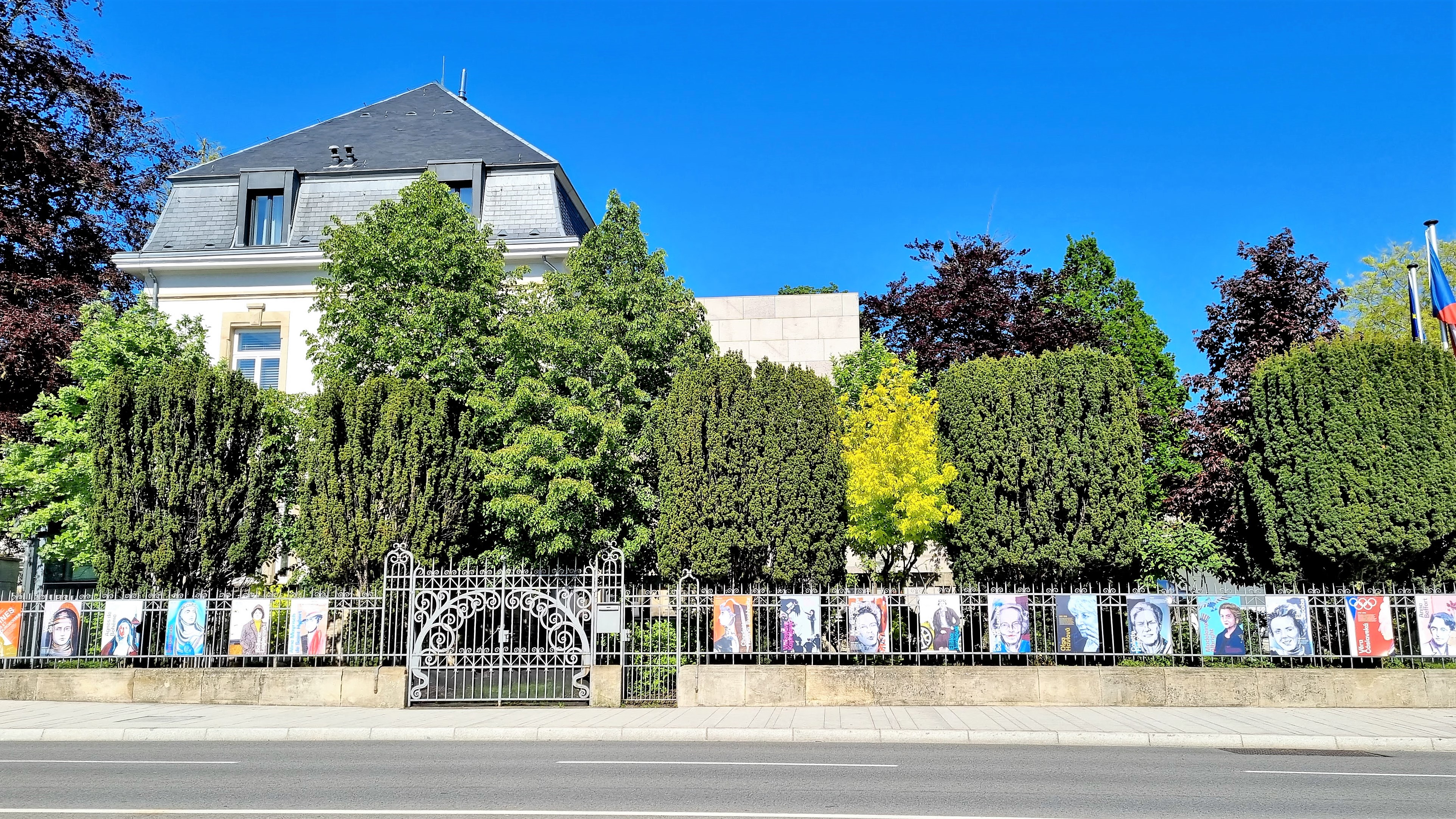
Embassy in Luxembourg City

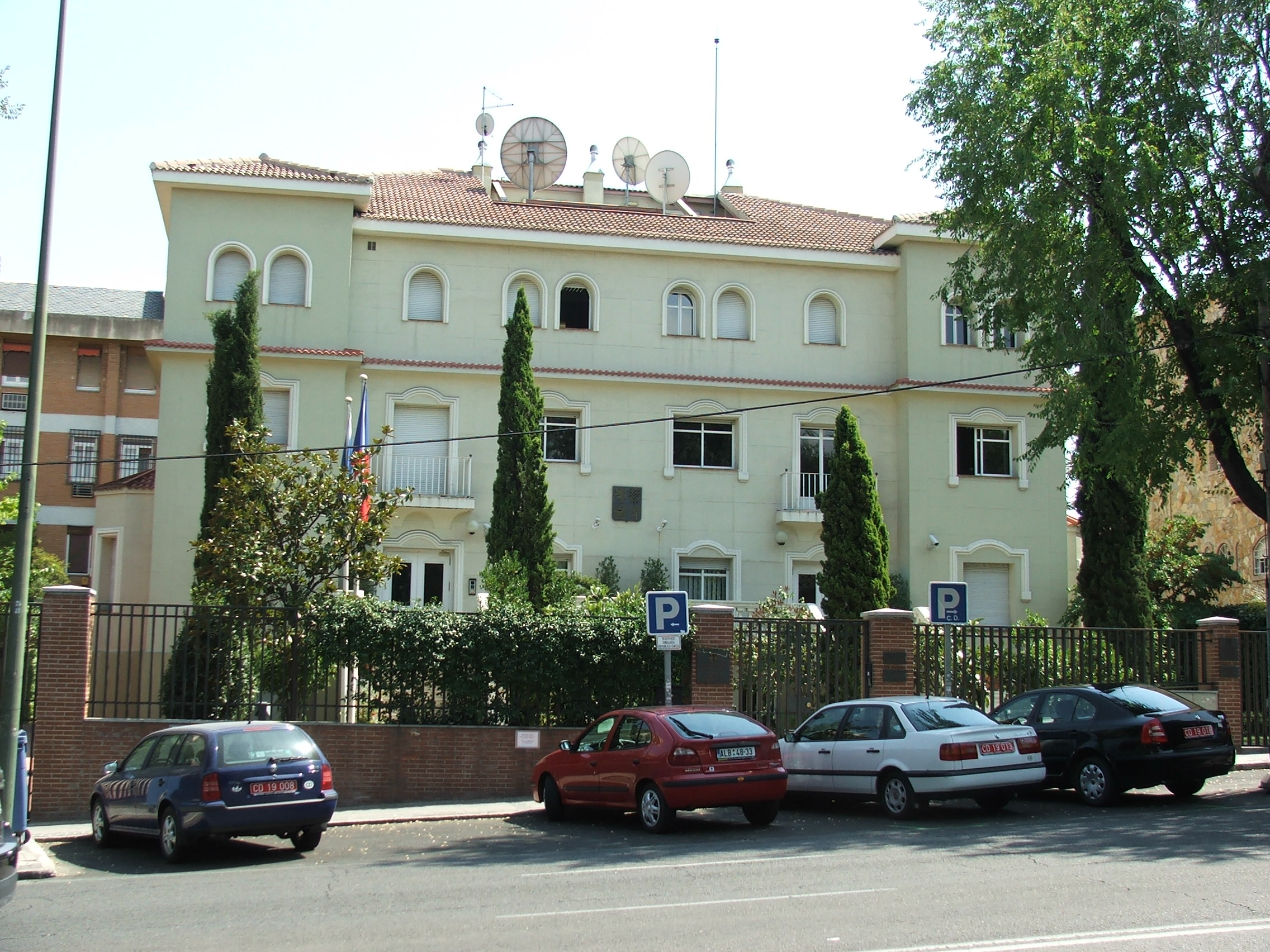
Embassy in Madrid

Building hosting the embassy in Manila

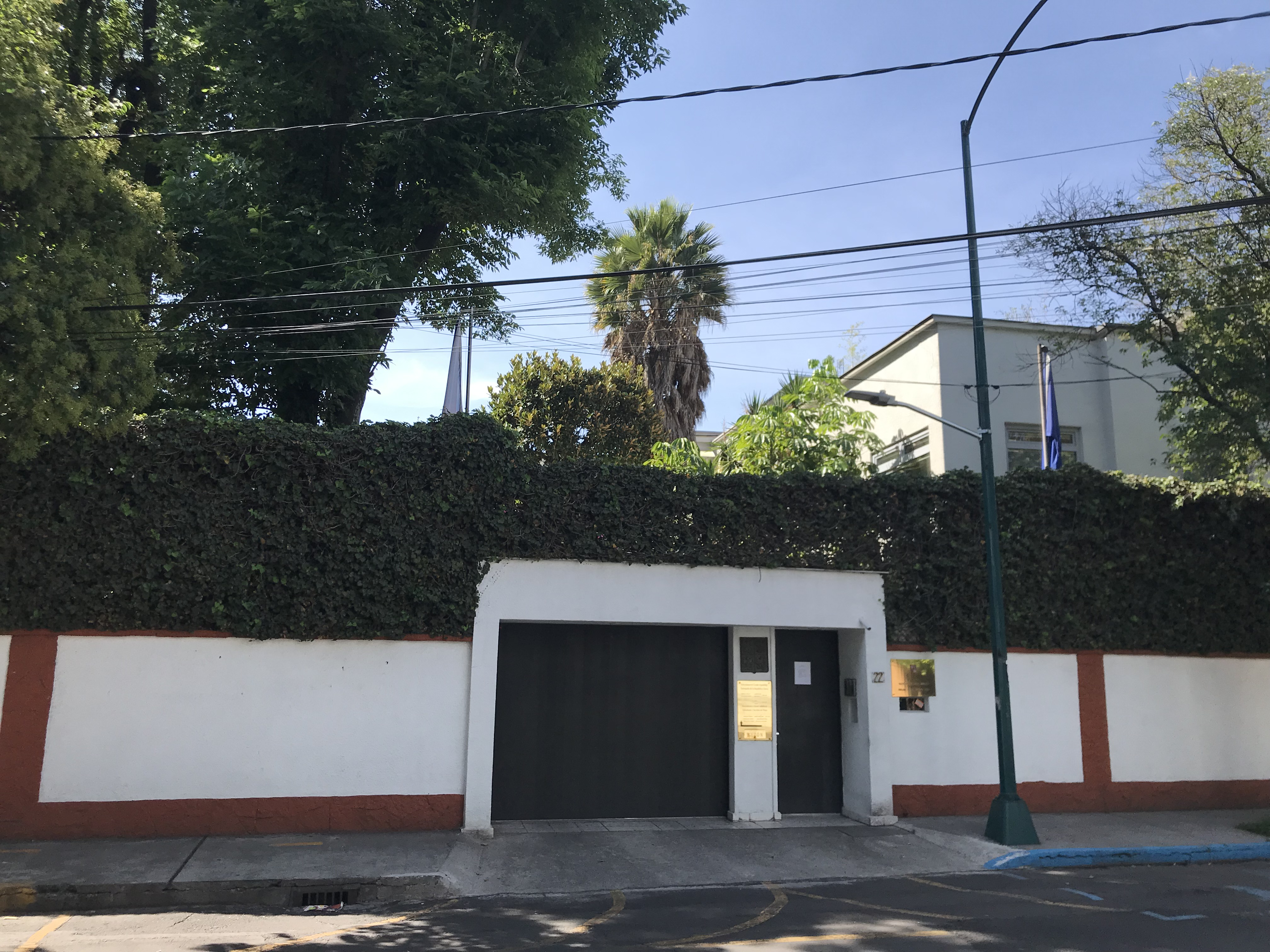
Embassy in Mexico City

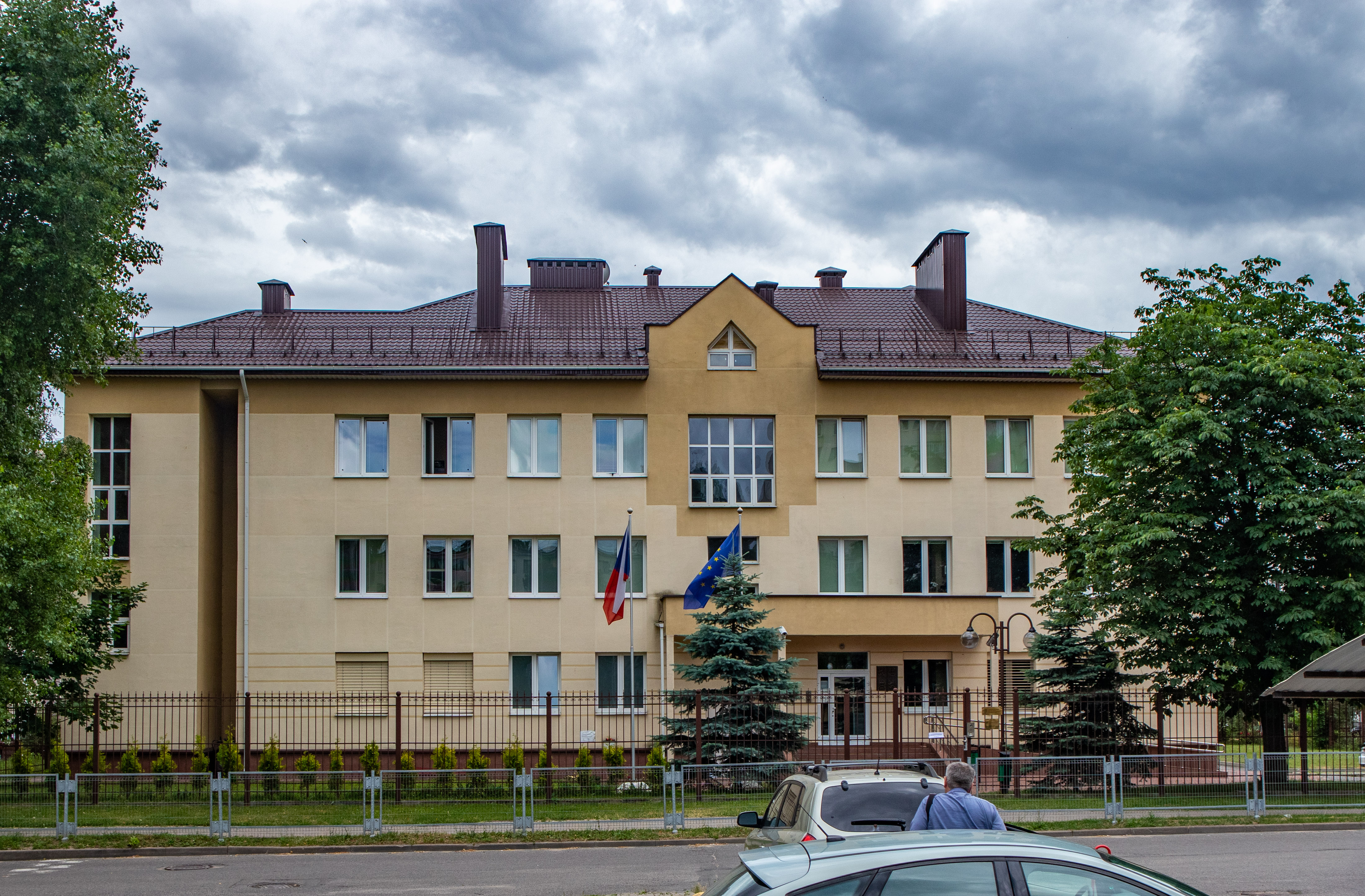
Embassy in Minsk

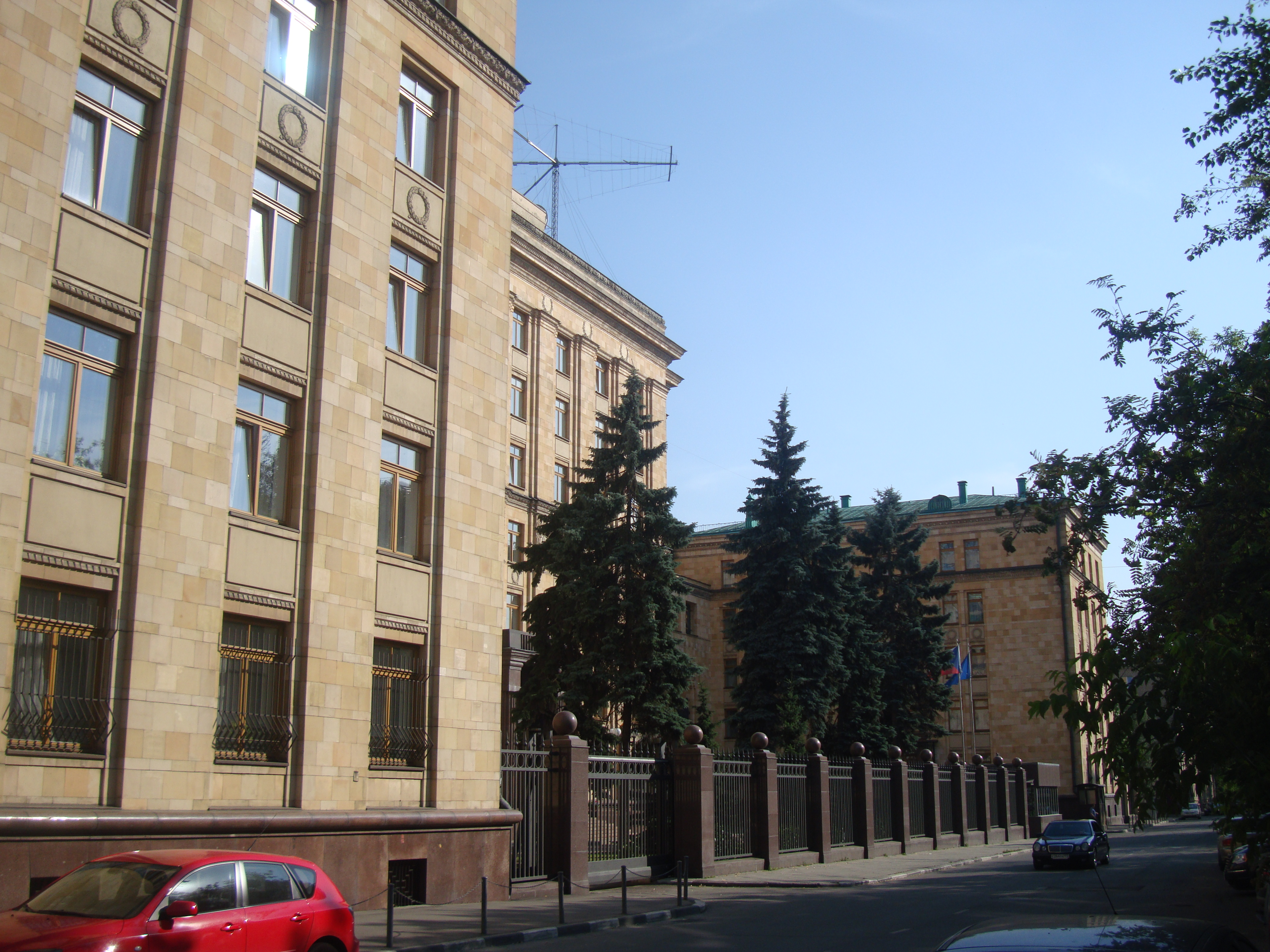
Embassy in Moscow

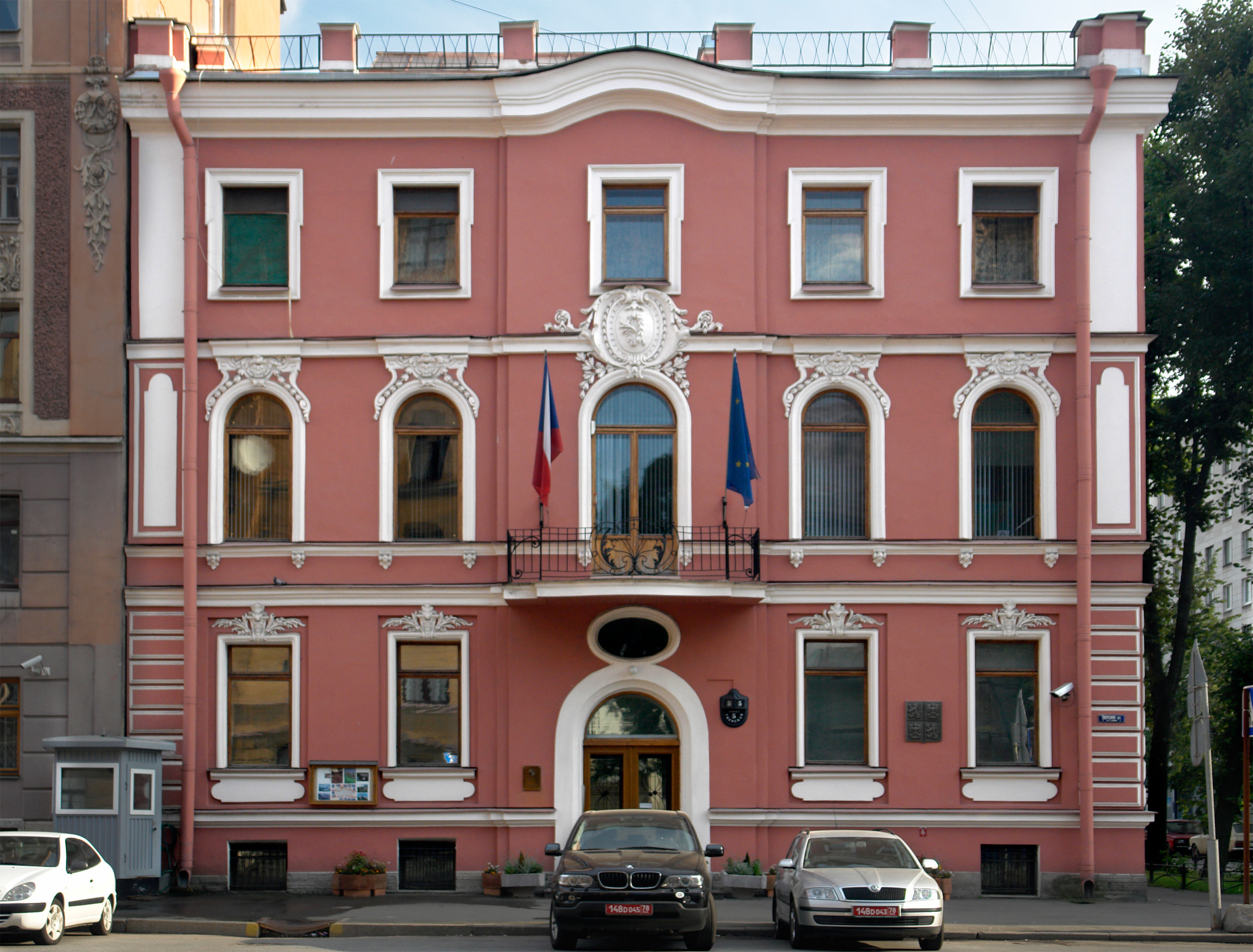
Consulate-General in Saint Petersburg

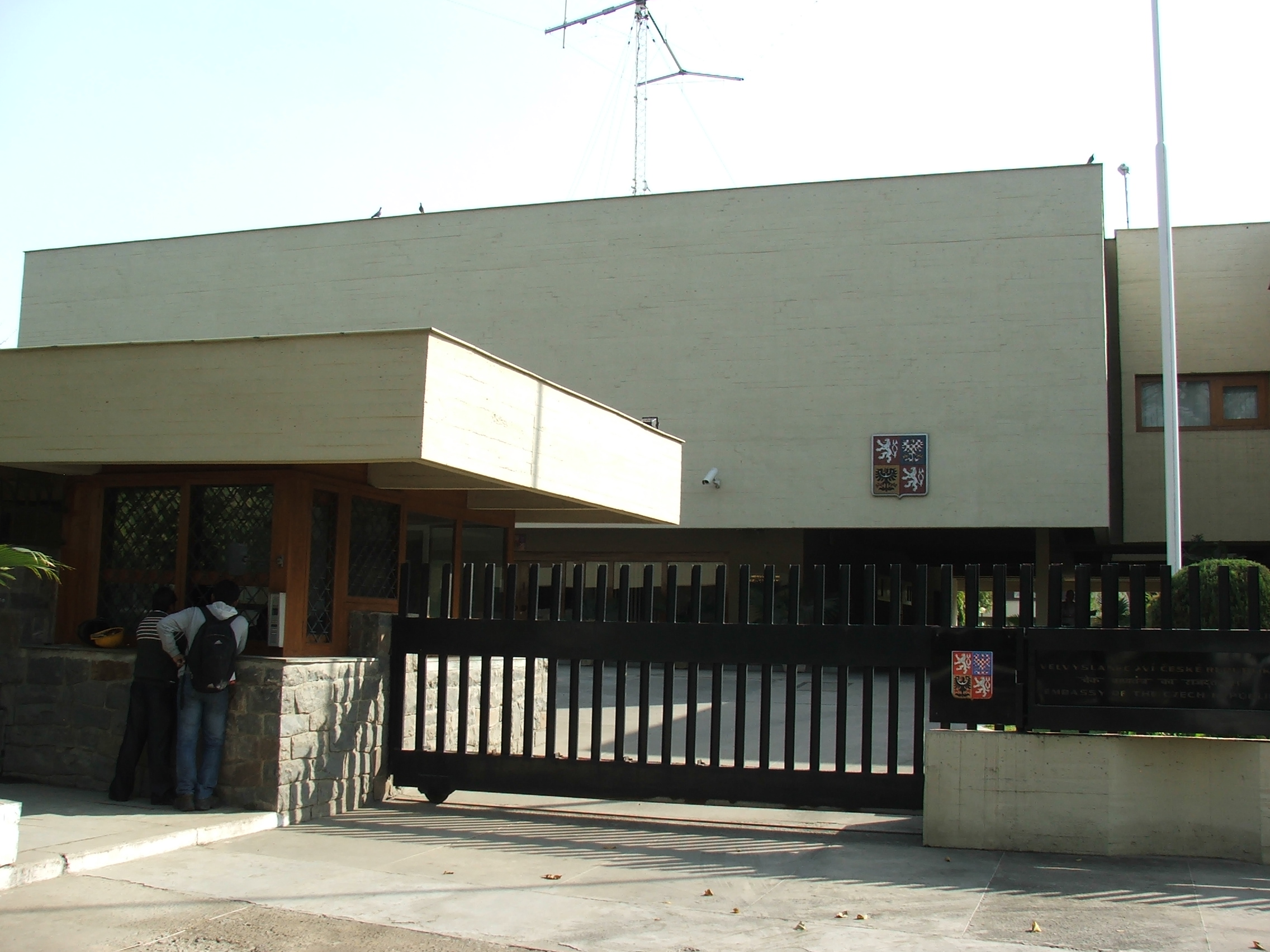
Embassy in New Delhi

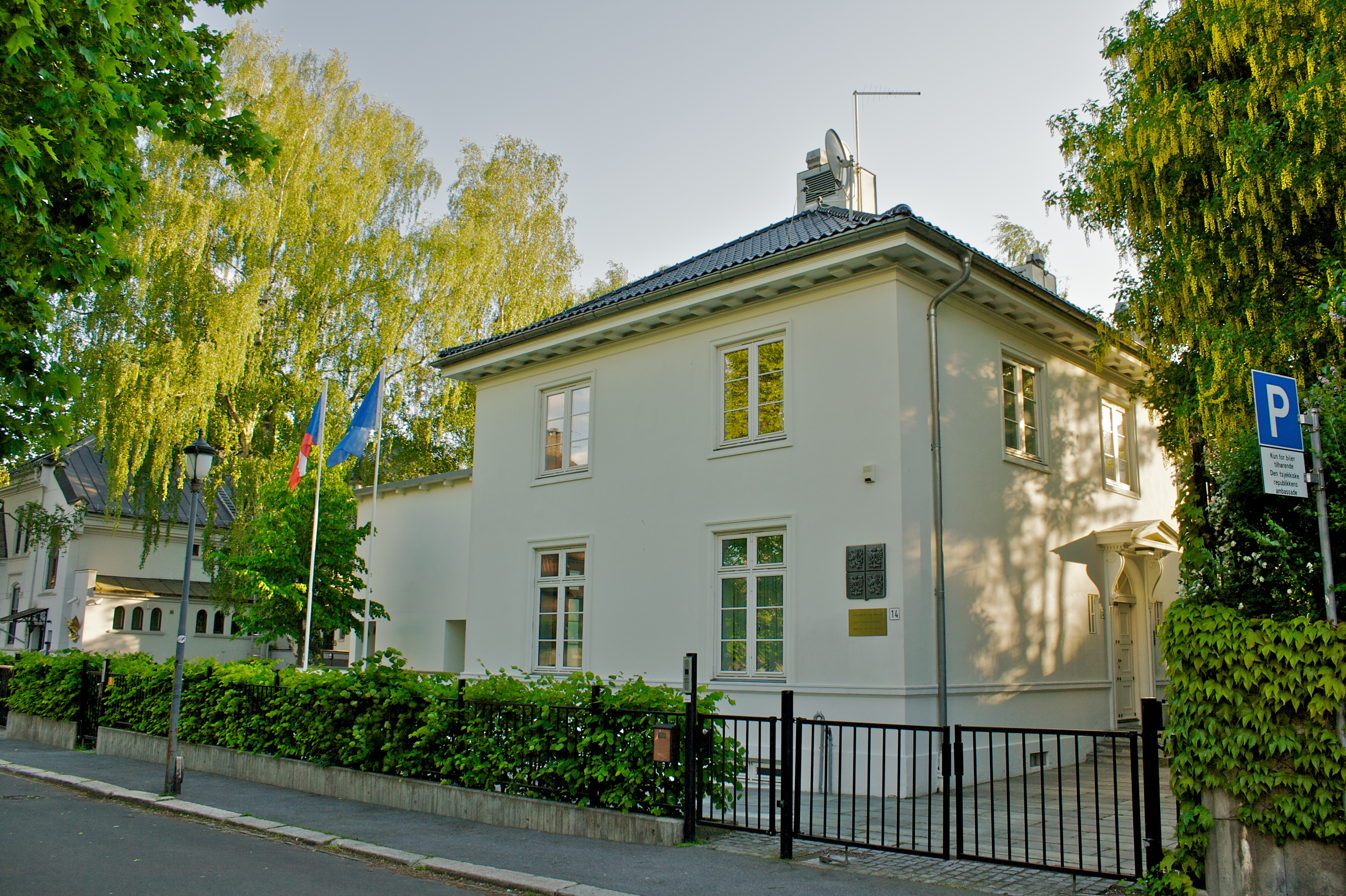
Embassy in Oslo

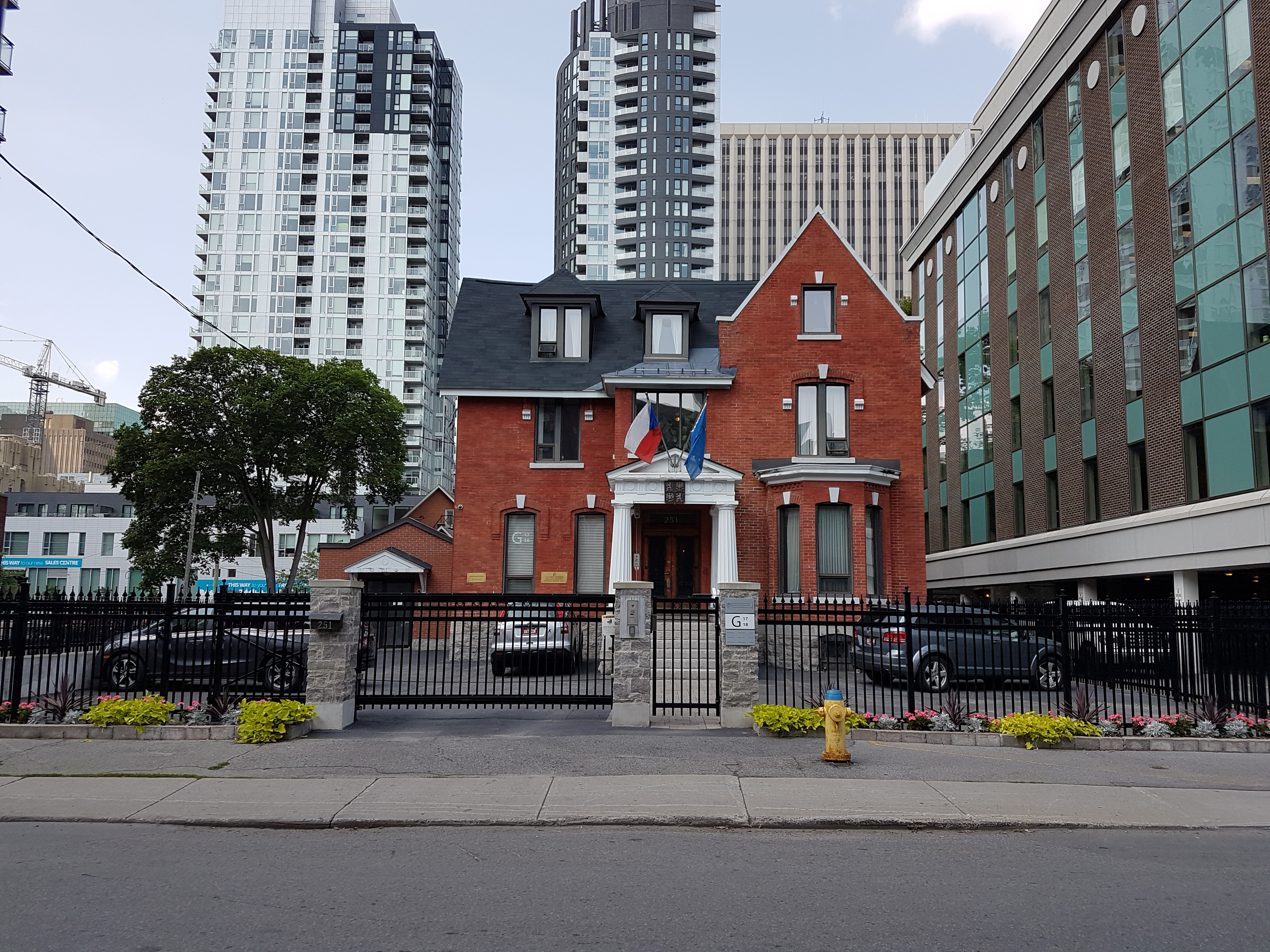
Embassy in Ottawa

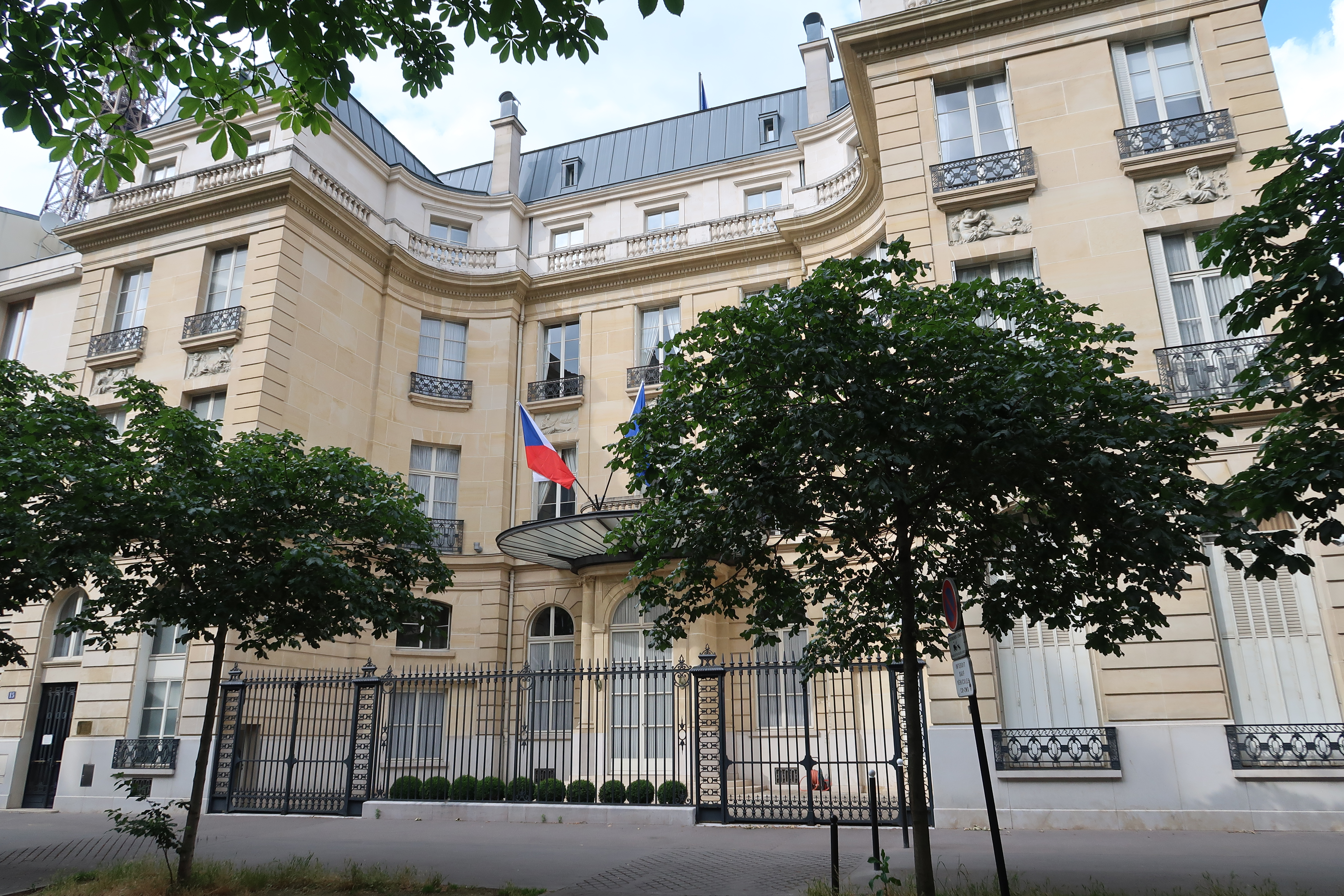
Embassy in Paris

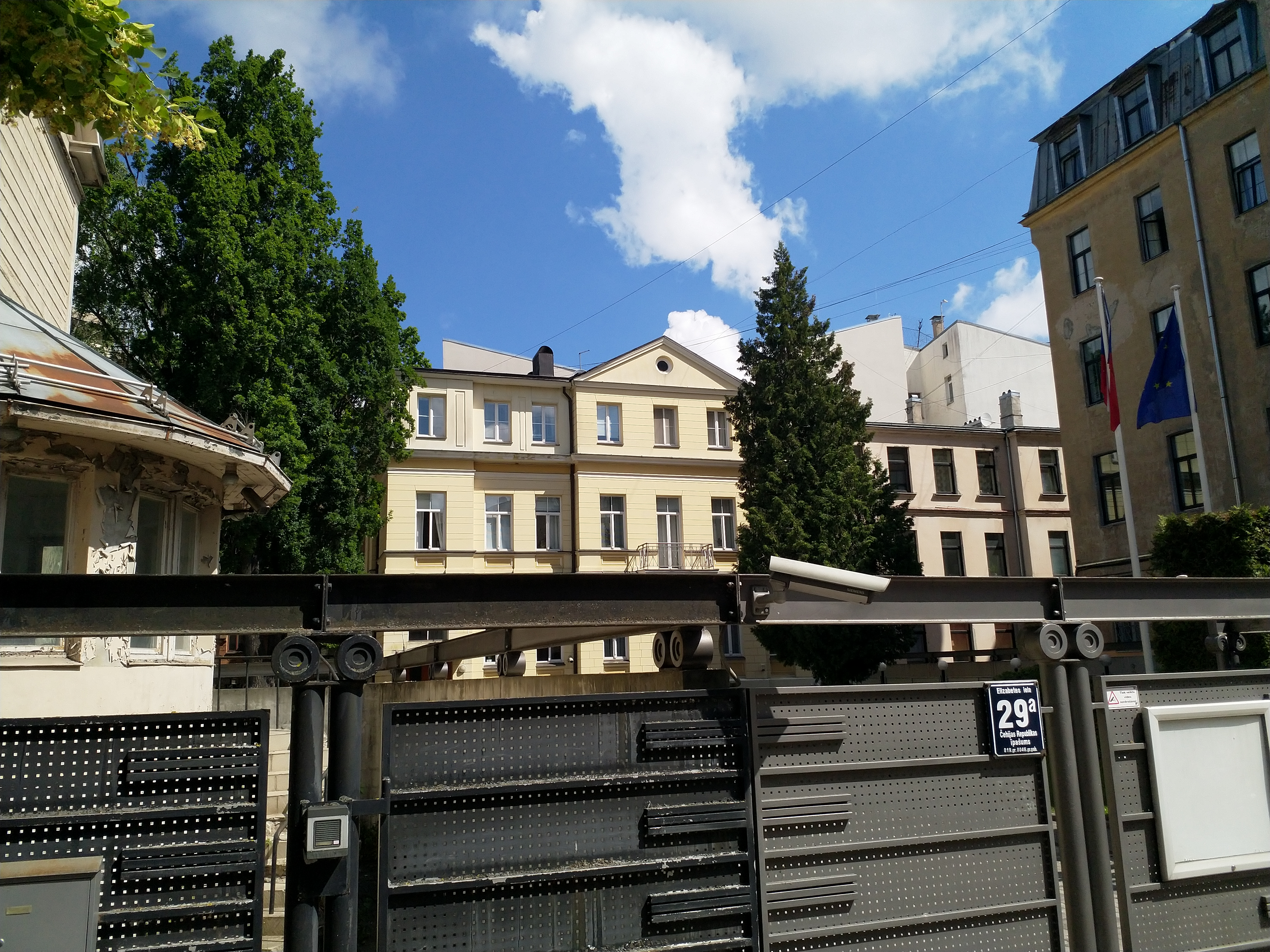
Embassy in Riga

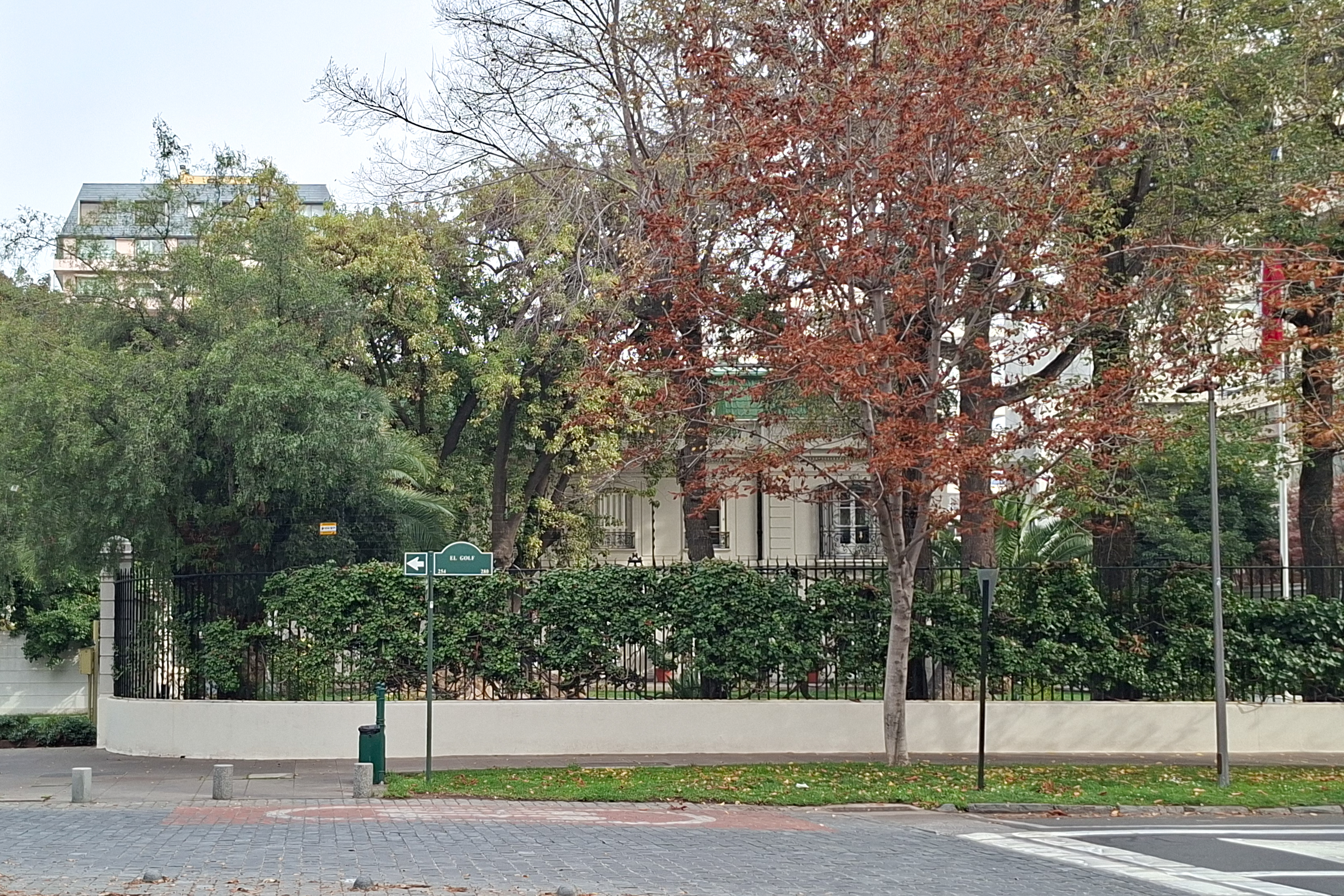
Embassy in Santiago

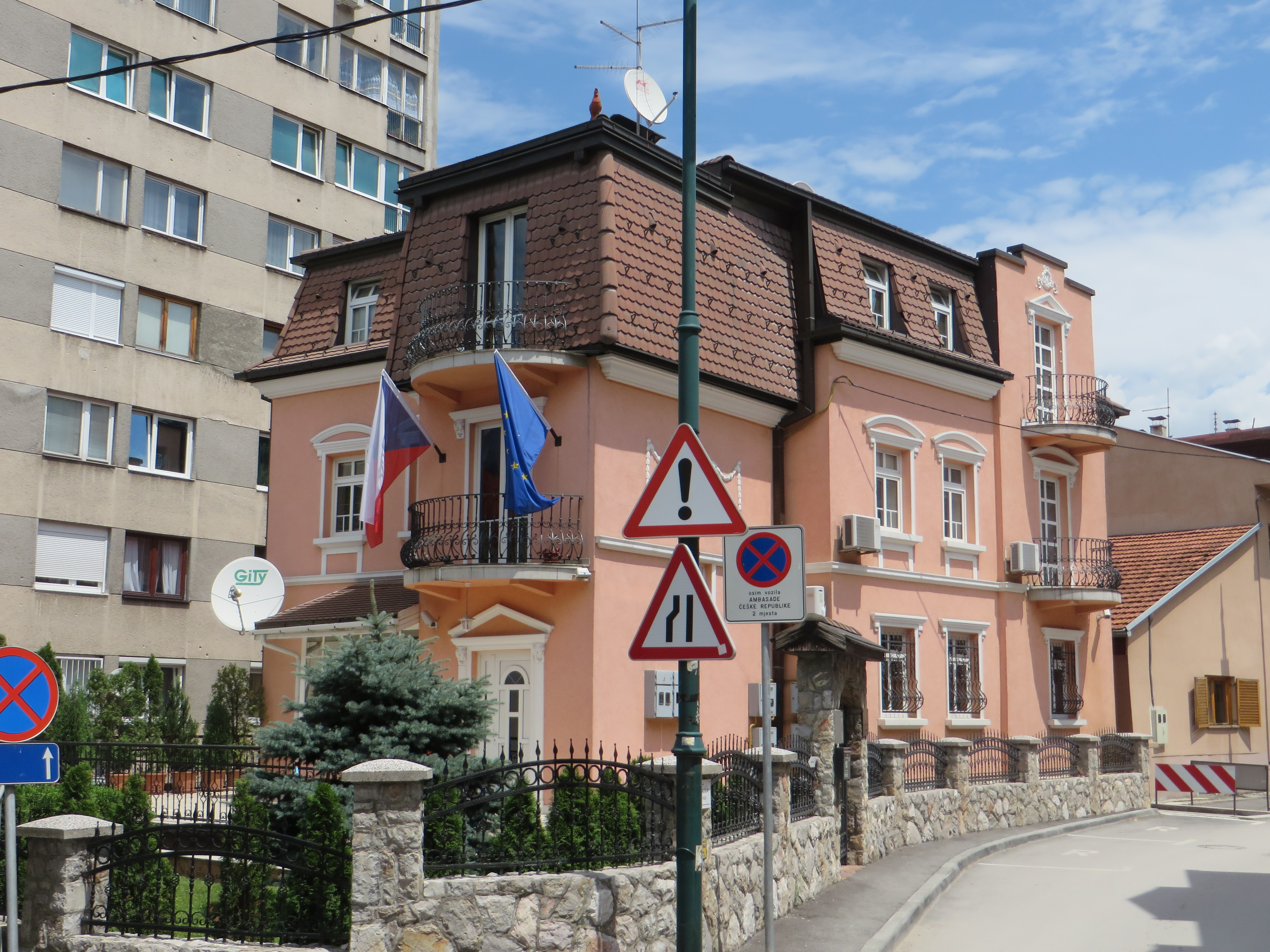
Embassy in Sarajevo

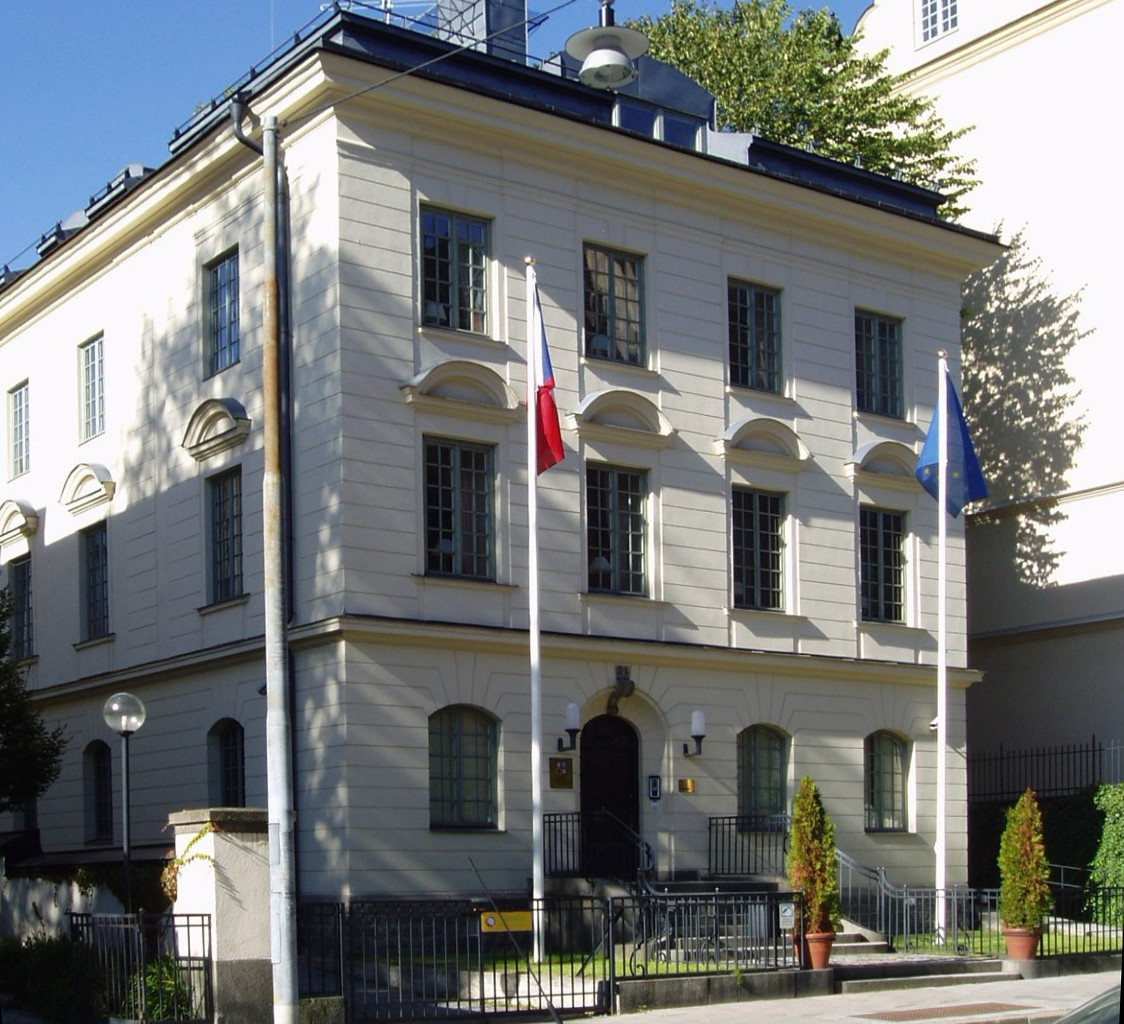
Embassy in Stockholm

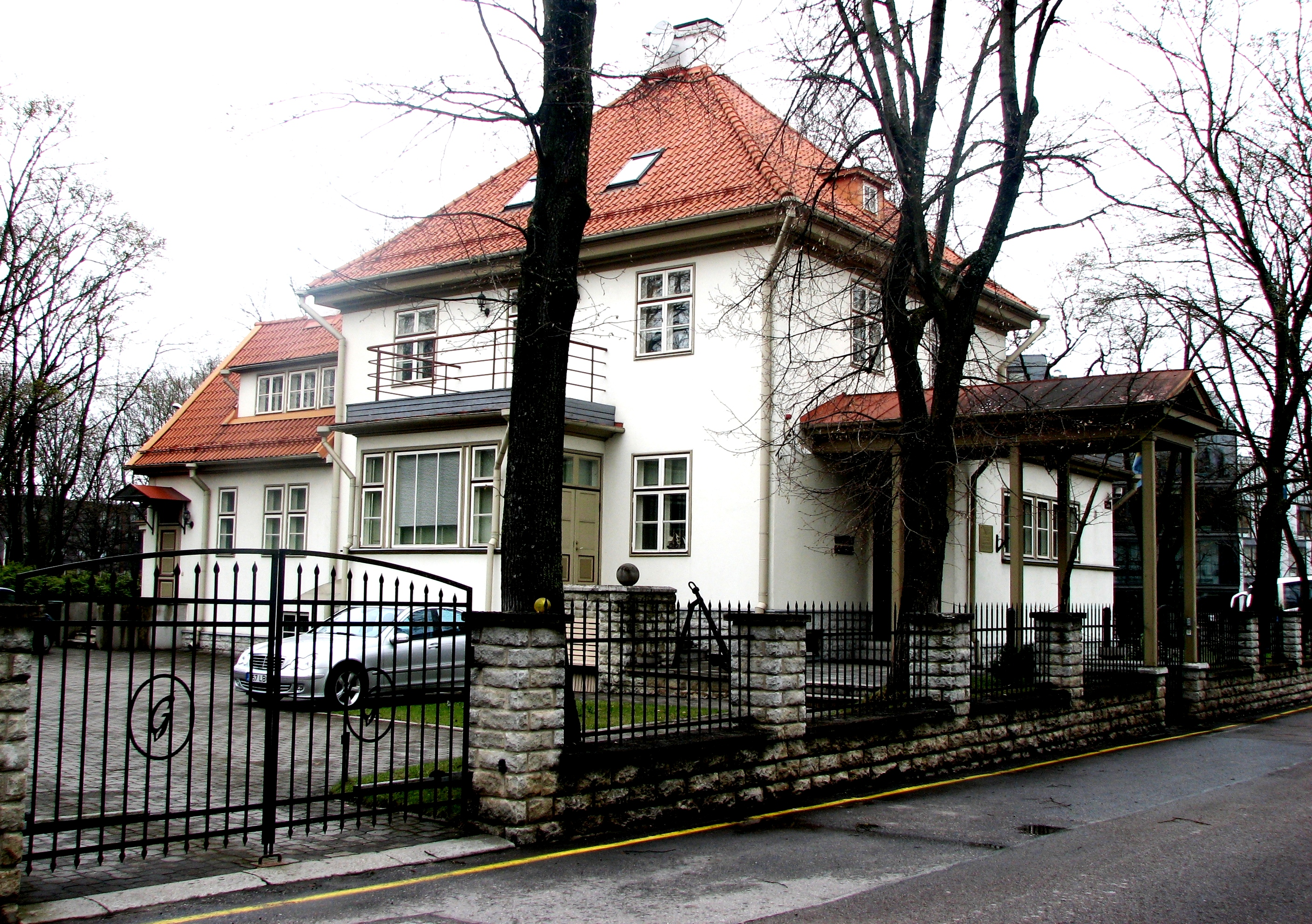
Embassy in Tallinn

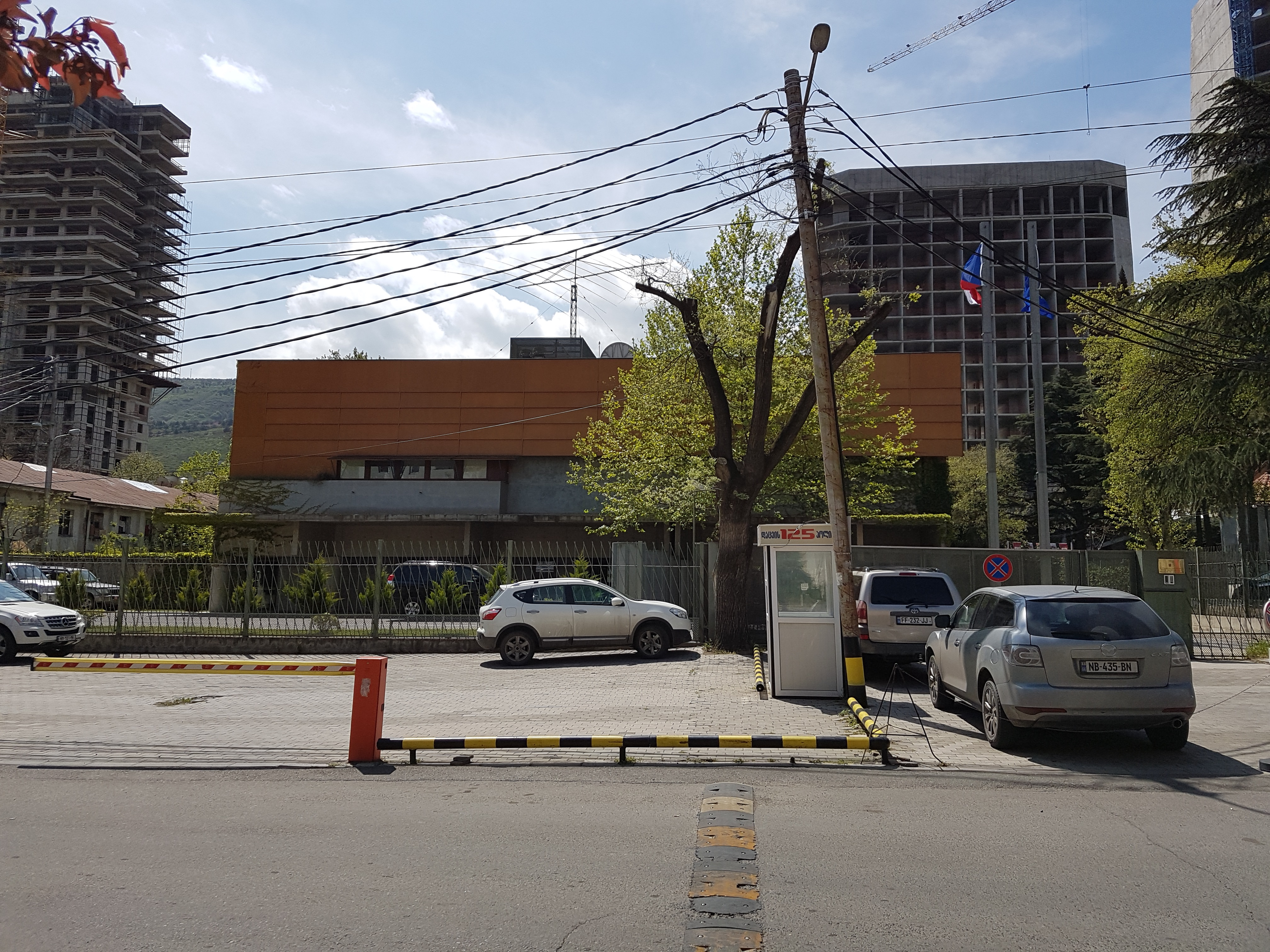
Embassy in Tbilisi

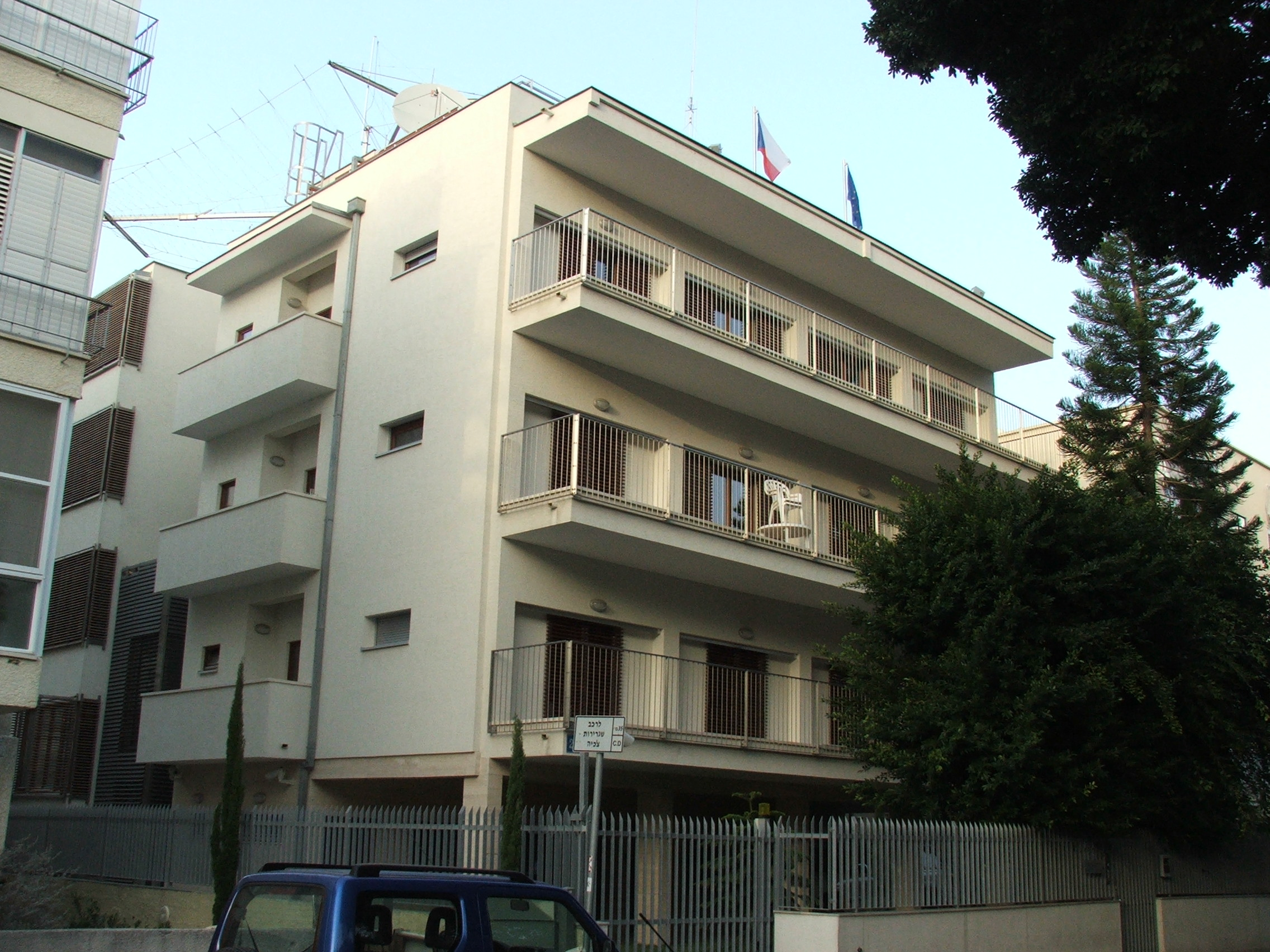
Embassy in Tel Aviv

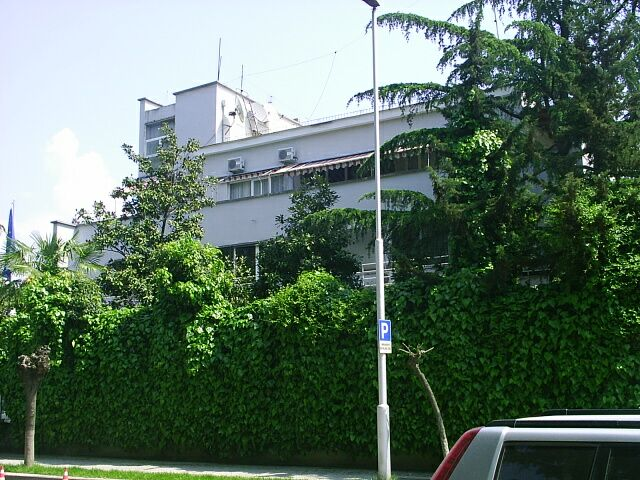
Embassy in Tirana

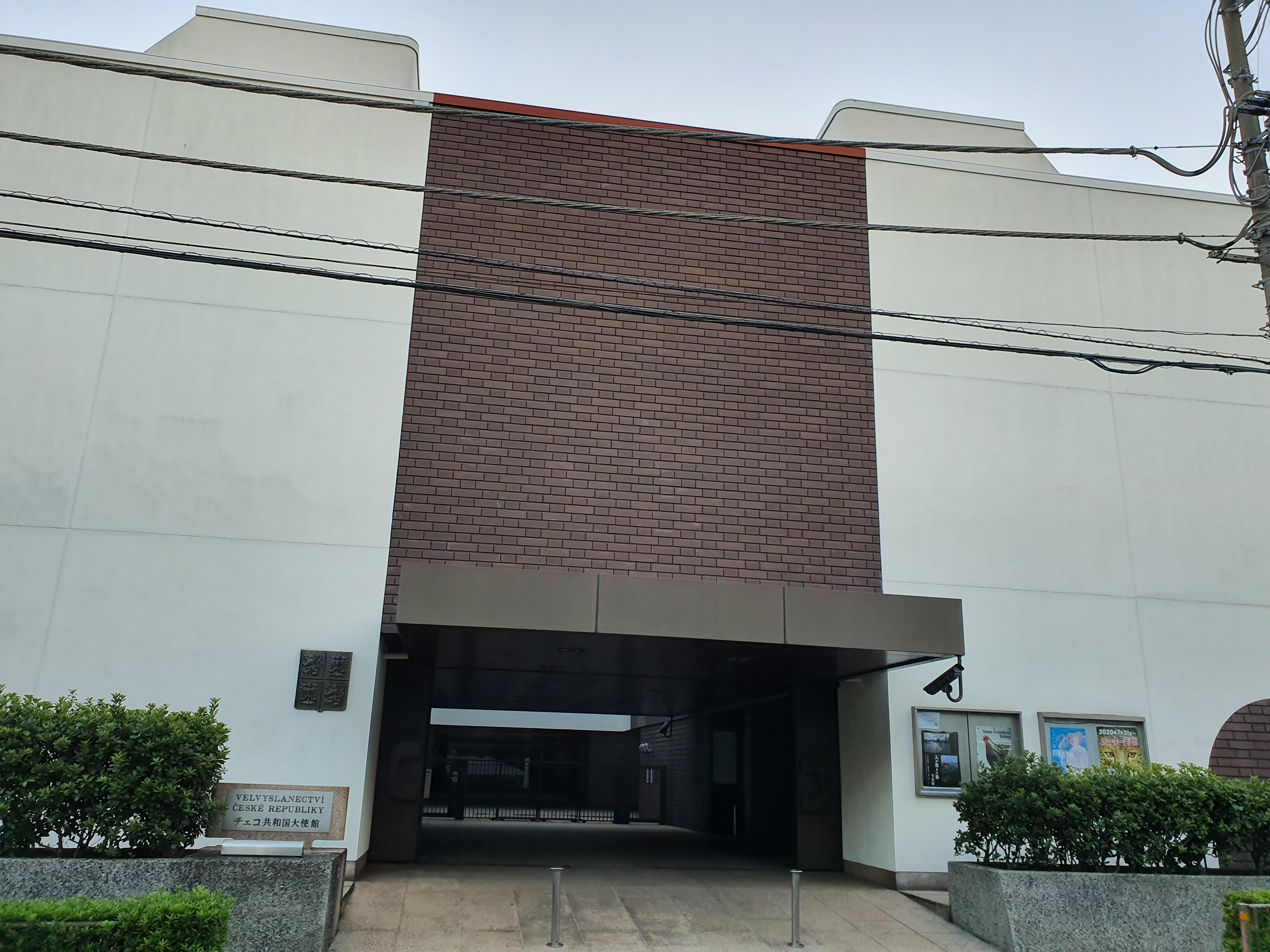
Embassy in Tokyo

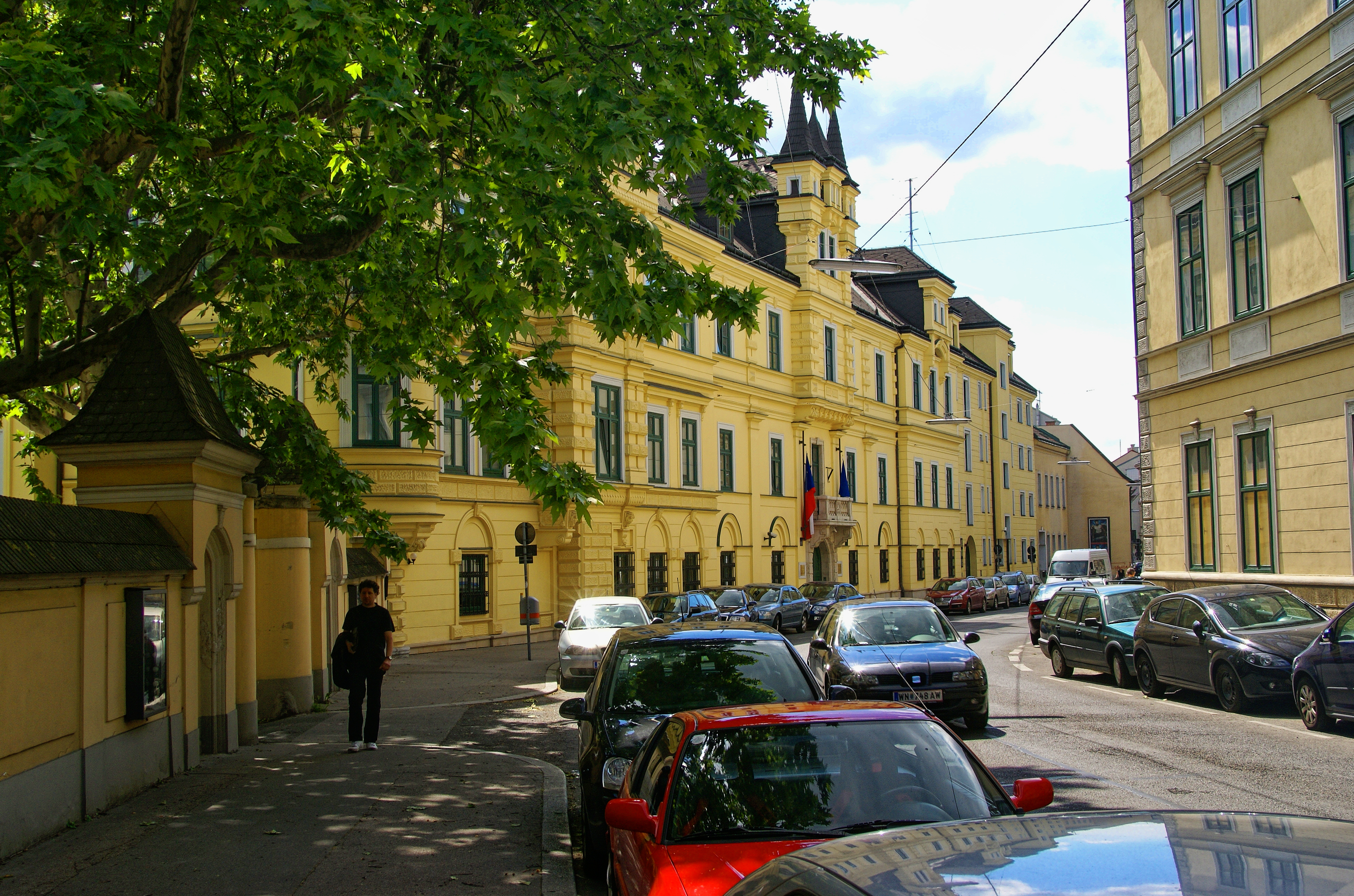
Embassy in Vienna

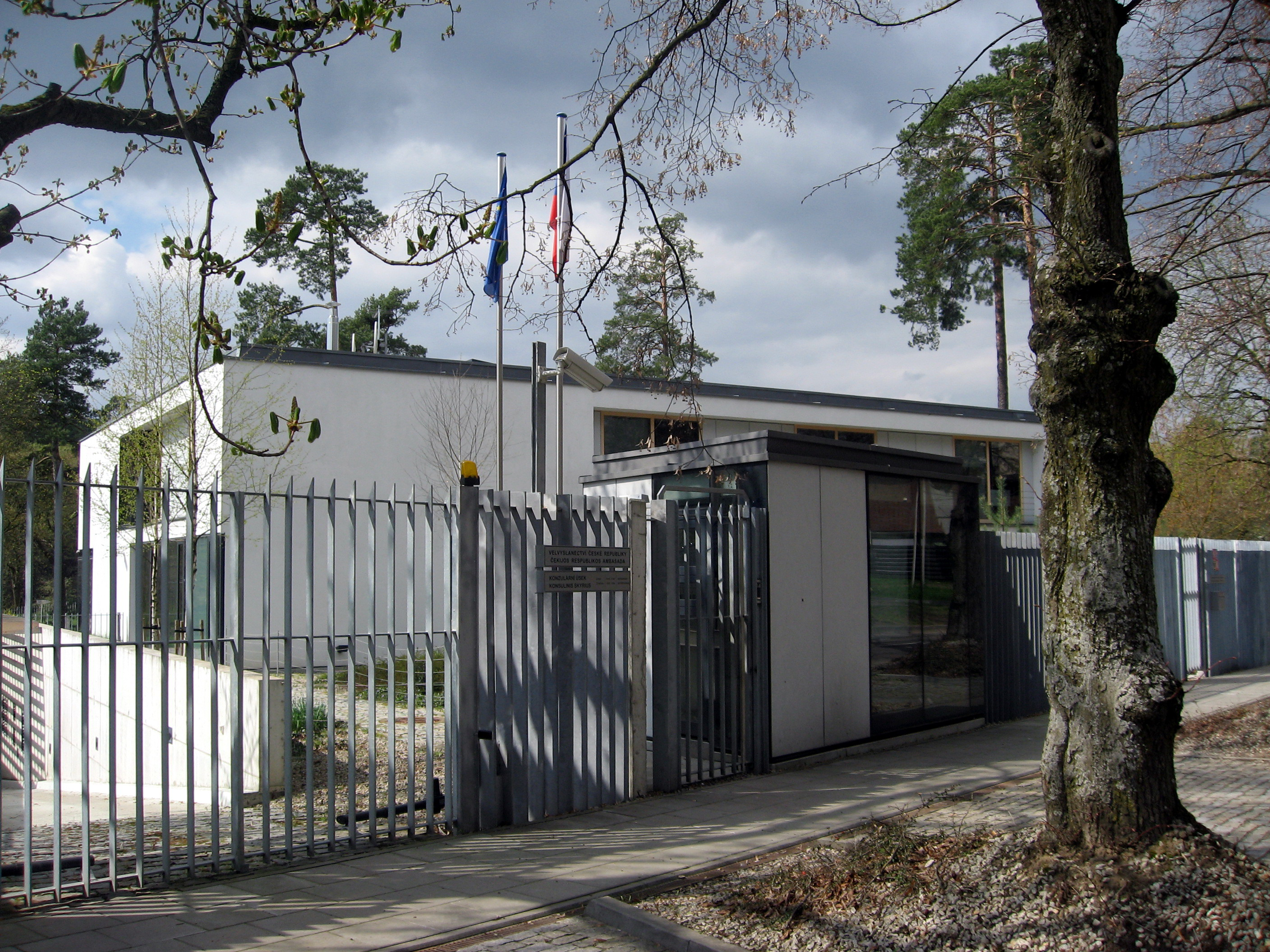
Embassy in Vilnius

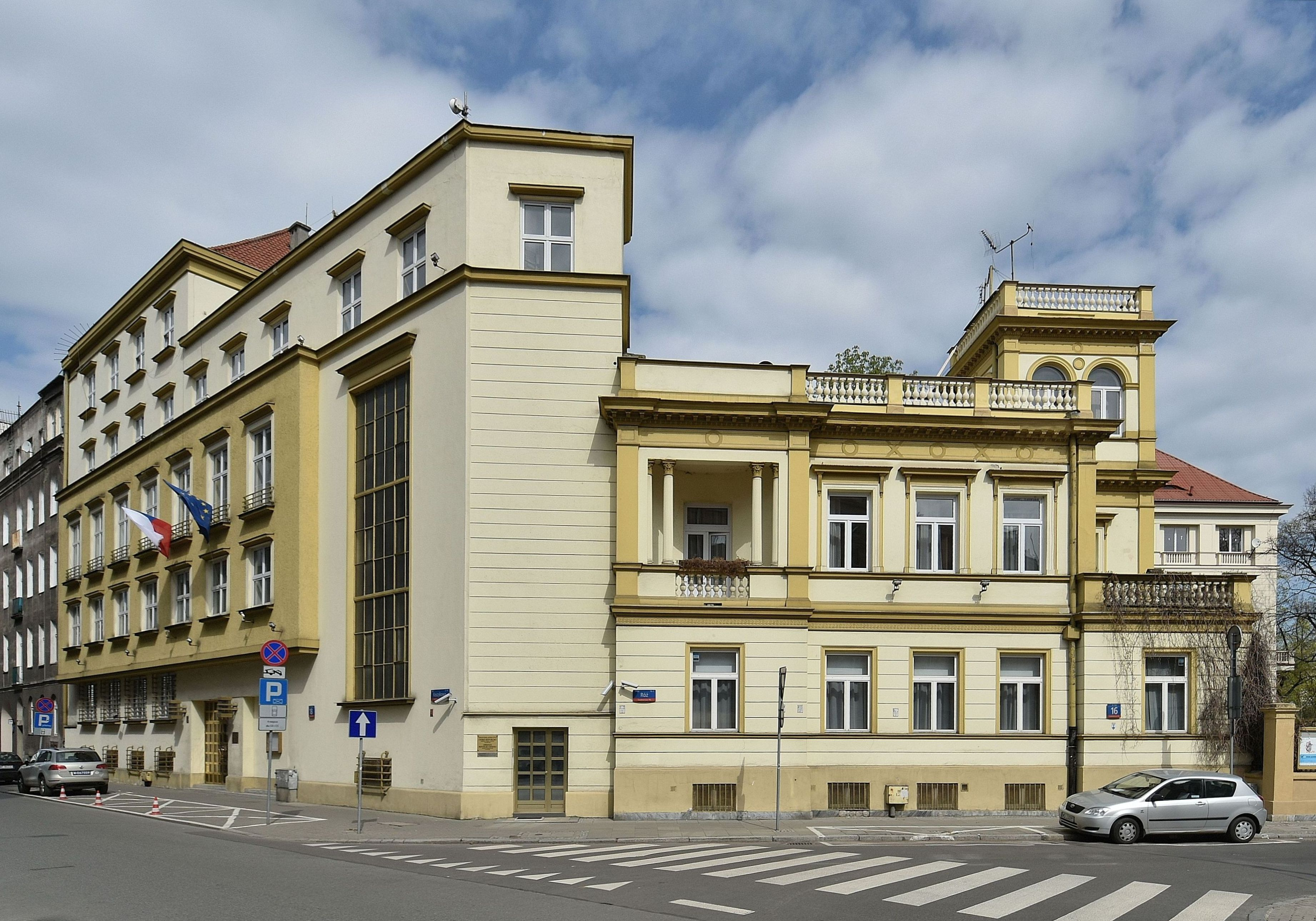
Embassy in Warsaw

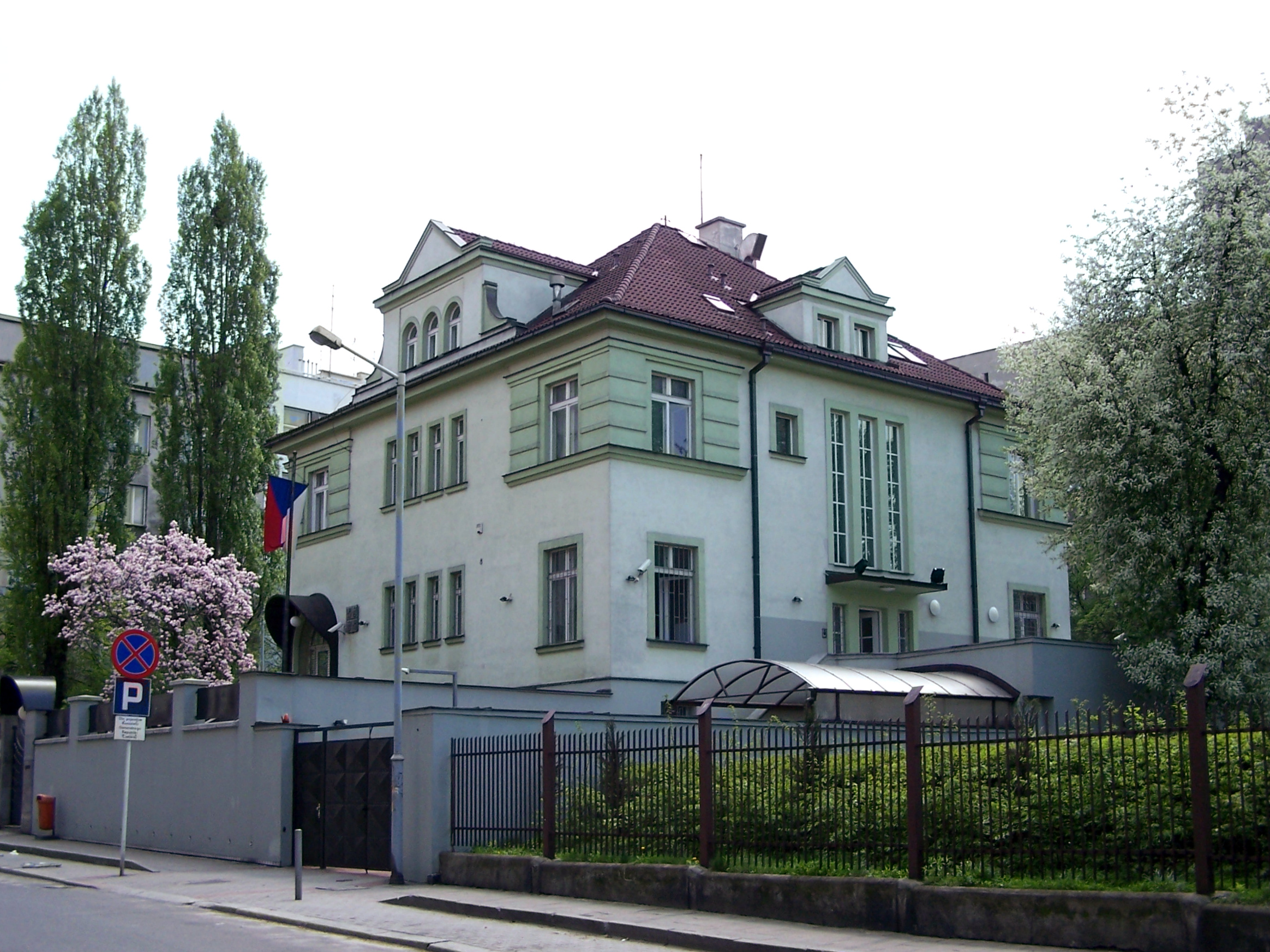
Consulate-General in Katowice

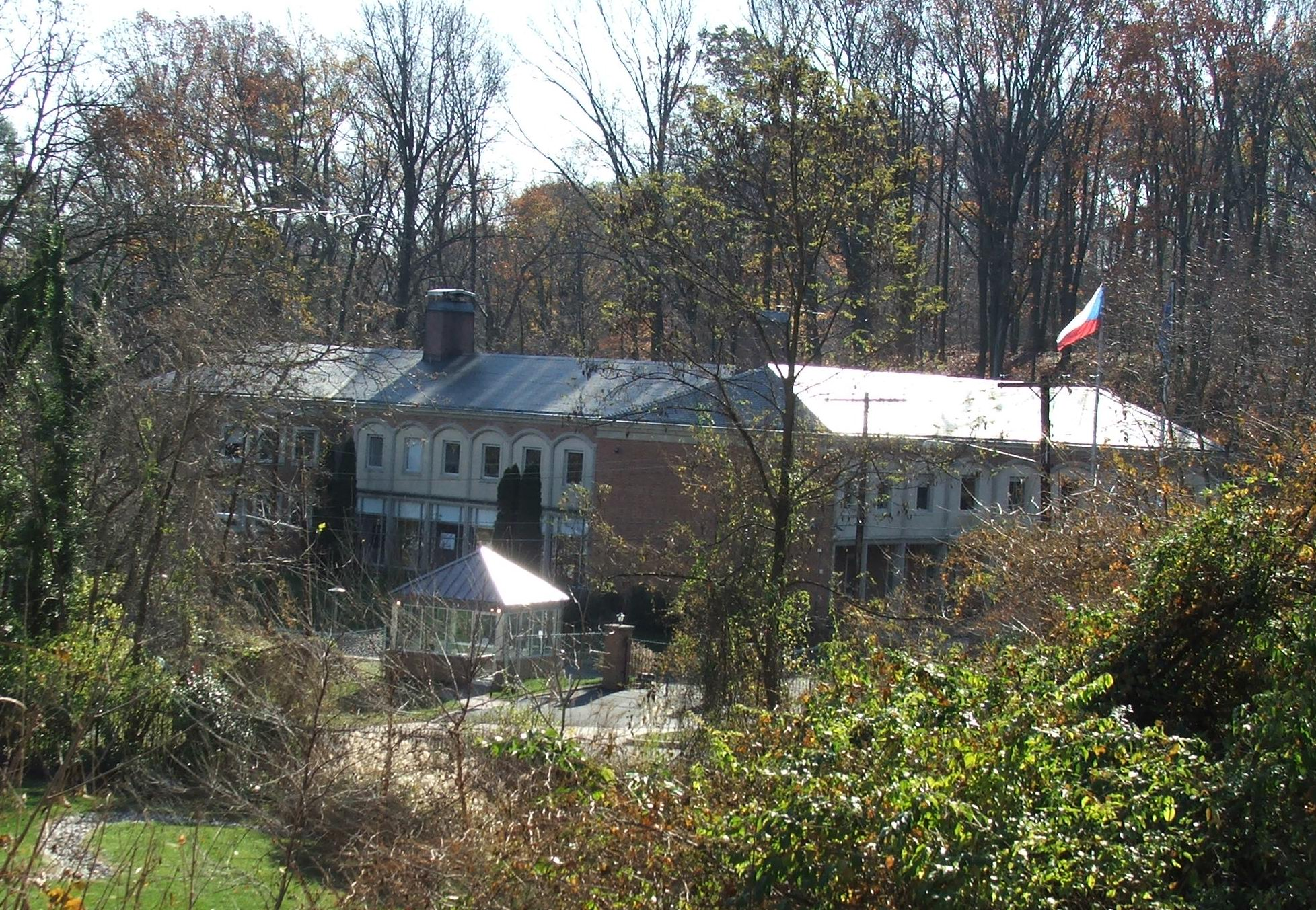
Embassy in Washington, D.C

== Closed missions ==
=== Africa ===
Host country	Host city	Mission	Year closed	Ref.
Angola	Luanda	Embassy	2010	
Ivory Coast	Abidjan	Embassy	2005	
Libya	Tripoli	Embassy (Note: To be reopened)	2019	
Mali	Bamako	Embassy	2022	
South Africa	Cape Town	Consulate-General	Unknown	
Zimbabwe	Harare	Embassy	2010	

=== Americas ===
Host country	Host city	Mission	Year closed	Ref.
Canada	Montreal	Consulate-General	2010	
Costa Rica	San José	Embassy	2011	
Uruguay	Montevideo	Embassy	2008	
Venezuela	Caracas	Embassy (Note: To be reopened.)	2011	

=== Asia ===
Host country	Host city	Mission	Year closed	Ref.
Afghanistan	Kabul	Embassy	2021	
China	Chengdu	Consulate-General	2022	
China	Hong Kong	Consulate-General		
Yemen	Sanaa	Embassy	2011	

=== Europe ===
Host country	Host city	Mission level	Year closed	Ref.
Germany	Bonn	Consulate-General	2008	
Poland	Wrocław	Consulate-General	2005	
Poland	Katowice	Consulate-General	2007	
Russia	Saint Petersburg	Consulate-General	2022	
Russia	Yekaterinburg	Consulate-General	2022	
Slovakia	Košice	Consulate-General	2009	
Ukraine	Donetsk	Consulate-General	2014	

== Missions to open ==
Host country	Host city	Mission	Ref.
Oman	Muscat	Embassy	
Venezuela	Caracas	Embassy	

== See also ==
- Foreign relations of the Czech Republic
- List of diplomatic missions in the Czech Republic
- Visa policy of the Schengen Area
