= Czechoslovakia–Yugoslavia relations =

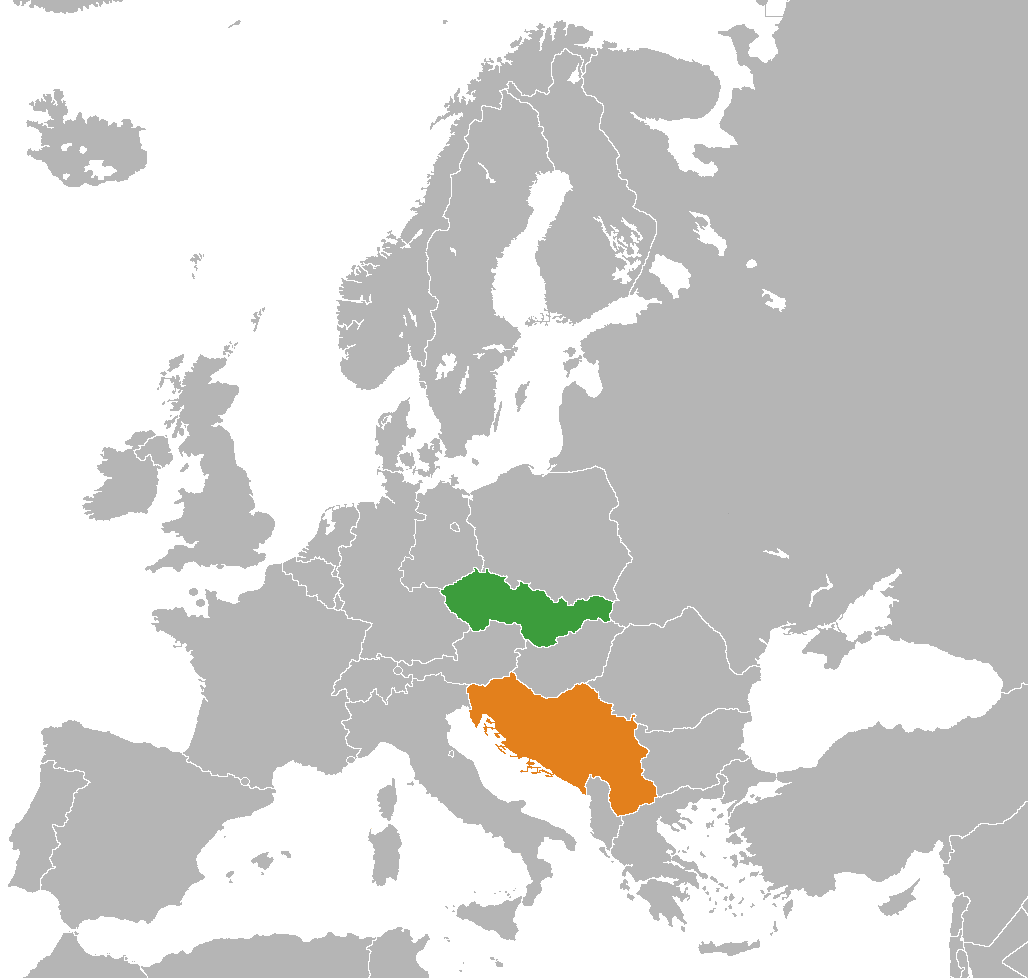

- Czechoslovakia: Yugoslavia

Czechoslovakia–Yugoslavia relations were historical foreign relations between Czechoslovakia and Yugoslavia, both of which are now-defunct states. Czechoslovakia and the Kingdom of Serbs, Croats and Slovenes were both created as union states of smaller Slavic ethnic groups. Both were created after the dissolution of Austria-Hungary, itself a multinational empire unable to appease its Slavic populations or implement a trialist reform in its final years. During the cold war, the countries fell in opposite camps; with Czechoslovakia coming under the Soviet sphere and Yugoslavia becoming a champion of the Non-Aligned Movement. The two countries still held some degree of trade relations with each other, although they were quite low.

== History ==
During the Austro-Hungarian time the Charles University in Prague and other Czechoslovak institutions of higher education became important center of higher education for South Slavic students with students and graduates including Veljko Vlahović, Ratko Vujović, Aleksandar Deroko, Nikola Dobrović, Petar Drapšin, Zoran Đorđević, Lordan Zafranović, Momir Korunović, Branko Krsmanović, Emir Kusturica, Ljubica Marić, Goran Marković, Predrag Nikolić, Stjepan Radić, Nikola Tesla and other.

=== Interwar period ===
The proposed Czech Corridor

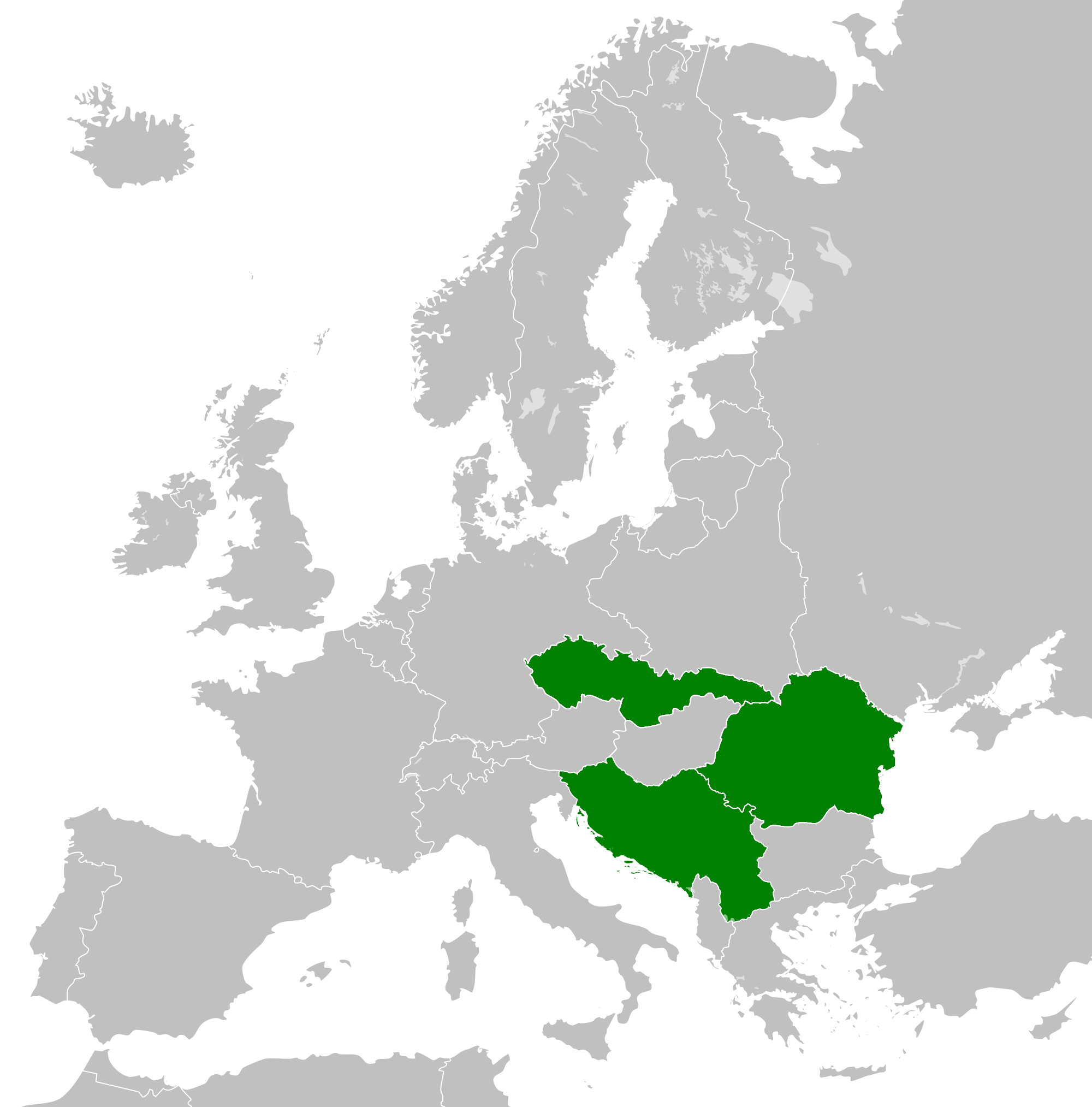
Little Entente

Czechoslovak delegates at the Paris Peace Conference of 1919 put forward a proposal to carve out a strip of land between Austria and Hungary to serve as a corridor between the two newly established Slavic countries with shared political and economic interests. Acting against Italian interests, the proposal to form the Czech Corridor was ultimately rejected.

In 1921, together with the Kingdom of Romania, Czechoslovakia and Yugoslavia established the Little Entente with the purpose of common defense against Hungarian revanchism and the prospect of a Habsburg restoration. Czechoslovakia and Yugoslavia signed their agreement on 4 June 1920 In 1923 Czechoslovak Republic bought attractive plot in the Bulevar kralja Aleksandra for its new representative diplomatic mission, and the plot was subsequently enlarged in 1931. The laying of the cornerstone was organized on the day of St. Václav the Good day in 1925 with Deputy Minister of Foreign Affairs J. Marković, representatives of the Association of National Minorities in the Kingdom of Serbs, Croats and Slovenes, Mayor of Belgrade Bobić and Head of Department in the Czechoslovak Ministry of Foreign Affairs Dr. Ribarž in attendance.

=== World War II ===
During World War II, both countries were occupied by Nazi Germany. Czechs were imprisoned in a subcamp of the Mauthausen concentration camp at the Ljubelj Pass in occupied Yugoslavia. The communist Yugoslav Partisans liberated modern day Yugoslavia without much foreign assistance while Czechoslovakia was liberated by the Red Army. After the war, both countries came under the supervision of the Soviet Union.

=== Cold War period ===
Both Czechoslovakia and Democratic Federal Yugoslavia were among 51 original member states of the United Nations. Close relations between the two states were canceled after the Tito–Stalin split of 1948, in which Yugoslavia left the Eastern Bloc and founded the Non-Aligned Movement. Yugoslavia supported reformist Alexander Dubček and political liberalization in Czechoslovakia which took place in the period of Prague Spring. Contrary to its verbal support to Soviet intervention in Hungary in 1956, Yugoslavia strongly condemned the Warsaw Pact invasion of Czechoslovakia in 1968. On 12 July 1968 President of Yugoslavia Josip Broz Tito gave an interview to Egyptian daily Al-Ahram where he stated that he believes that Soviet leaders are not "such short-sighted people [...] who would pursue a policy of force to resolve the internal affairs of Czechoslovakia". President Tito visited Prague on 9 and 10 August 1968, just days before the intervention while large group of 250,000 demonstrators gathered in Belgrade once the intervention started. Yugoslavia provided refuge for numerous Czechoslovak citizens (many on holidays) and politicians including Ota Šik, Jiří Hájek, František Vlasak and Štefan Gašparik. The 1969 Non-Aligned Consultative Meeting was held in Belgrade following the events in Czechoslovakia. Tito wished for Czechoslovakia to liberalize itself and adopt a modern and flexible form of market socialism, similar to what Yugoslavia had done after the acrimonious Tito-Stalin split. However, Czechoslovakia would see its brief period of liberalization reversed under the repressive era of Normalization, with orthodox one-party rule and economic centralism re-instated in the country. This dashed Tito’s hopes for a post-Stalinist communist movement in Europe, pushing him to further economic relations with the west as well as the Third World.

=== Post 1989 relations ===
Both federal states faced rising economic and nationalist challenges in late 1980's, issues that culminated in the violent breakup of Yugoslavia in what is known as the Yugoslav Wars- a situation that contrasted sharply with the peaceful dissolution of Czechoslovakia. Contrary to what was seen following the dissolution of the Soviet Union, wherein the Russian Federation was internationally recognized as the sole successor state of the USSR, none of the former Czechoslovak or Yugoslav constituent republics attained such status. The Czech Republic and Slovakia reached an agreement on shared succession based on which both had to reapply and rejoin all international organizations and agreements. Nevertheless the Czech Republic unilaterally decided to keep the old flag of Czechoslovakia as its own flag (despite being contrary to the agreement), but avoided any claim on sole succession. In the Yugoslav case, the rump state which is Federal Republic of Yugoslavia initially asserted that it was the sole legal successor state to the Socialist Federal Republic of Yugoslavia but their claim which was rejected by U.N. Security Council Resolution 777. The Arbitration Commission of the Peace Conference on Yugoslavia asserted in its Opinion No. 1, that the Socialist Federal Republic of Yugoslavia is in the process of dissolution while Opinion No. 10 stated that the FRY (Serbia and Montenegro) could not legally be considered a continuation of the former SFRY, but it was a new state. After initial resistance to this legal opinion (partially supported by certain Non-Aligned countries), The so-called Federal Republic of Yugoslavia accepted shared succession after the overthrow of Slobodan Milošević. In the process of the peaceful dissolution of Serbia and Montenegro in 2006, Montenegro accepted that Serbia will remain as the sole successor of their union, inheriting international rights and obligations, notably the guaranty of territorial integrity from the United Nations Security Council Resolution 1244.

With the dissolution of both states, eight sovereign states (Czech Republic, Croatia, Bosnia and Herzegovina, North Macedonia, Slovenia, Montenegro, Slovakia and Serbia) have emerged. Since the Czechoslovak Federation continued to exist until 1993, the country established bilateral relations with some newly independent and recognized post-Yugoslav states over the course of 1992. The Czech Republic, Slovakia, Slovenia and Croatia have joined the European Union, while Serbia, North Macedonia, Bosnia and Herzegovina and Montenegro are official EU candidates. Kosovo has been recognized by more than 100 countries, however it is not yet fully recognized as a country in most international organizations.

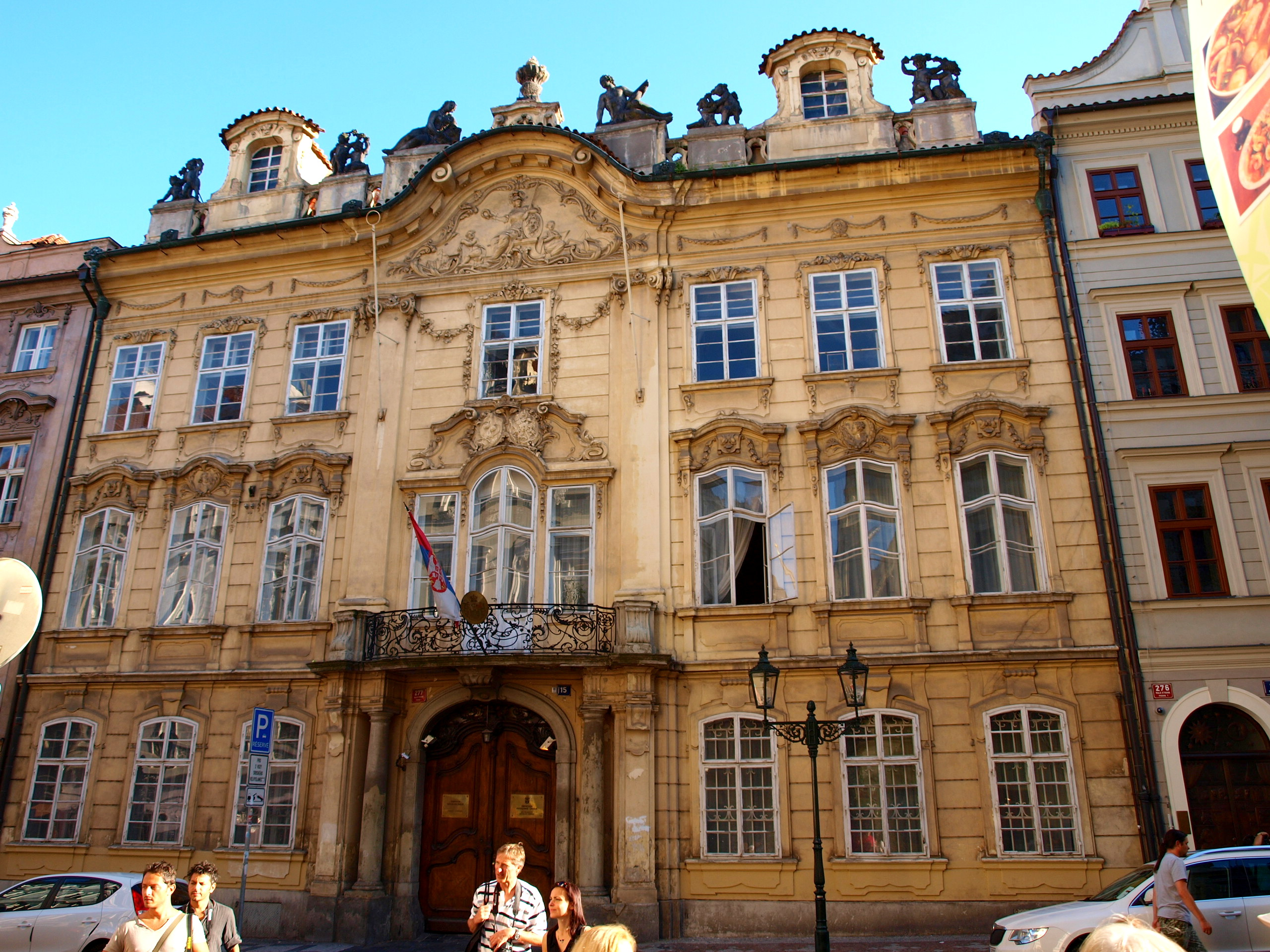
Former Embassy of Yugoslavia in Prague (today Embassy of Serbia)

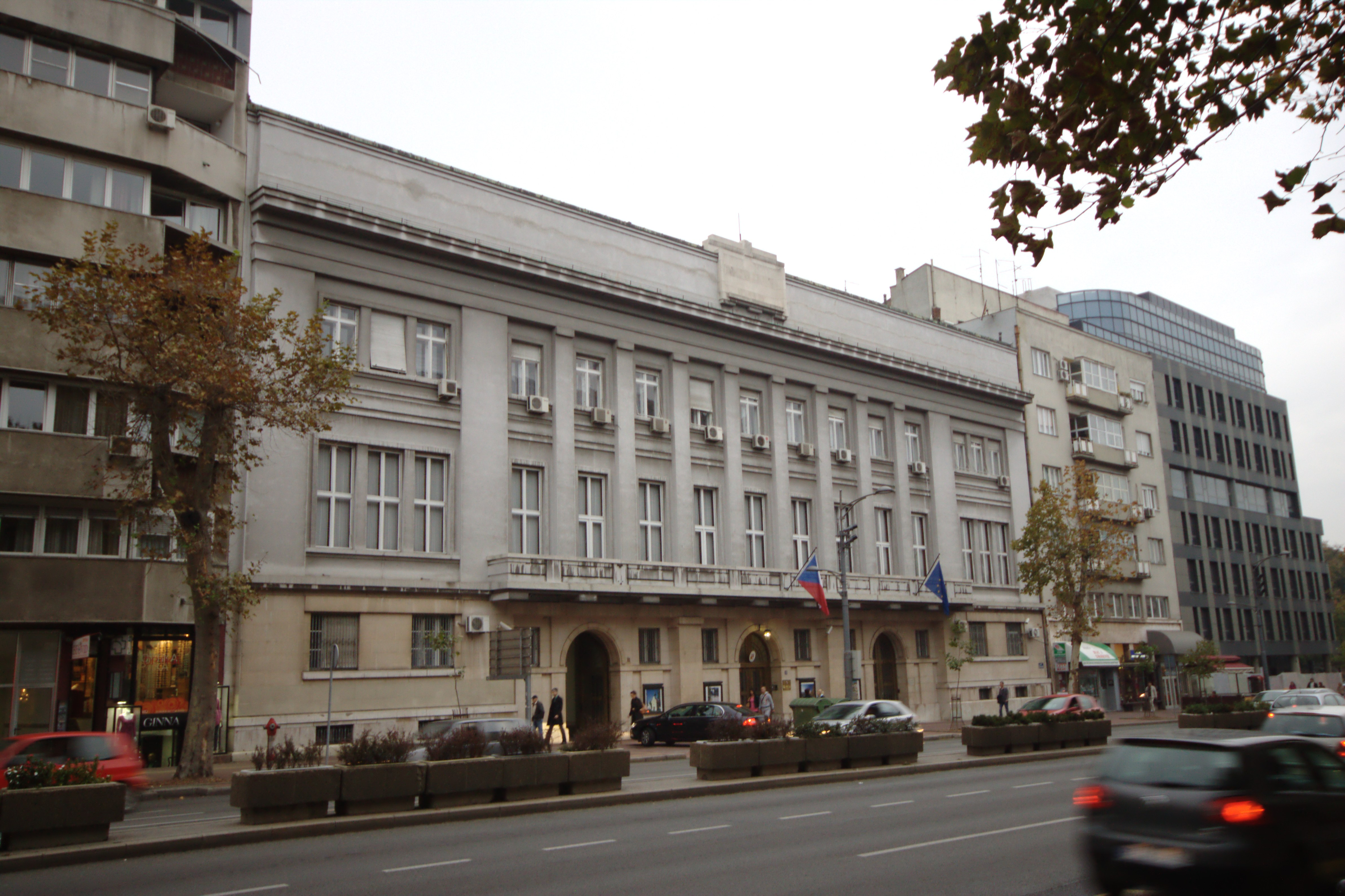
Former Embassy of Czechoslovakia in Belgrade (today Embassy of the Czech Republic)

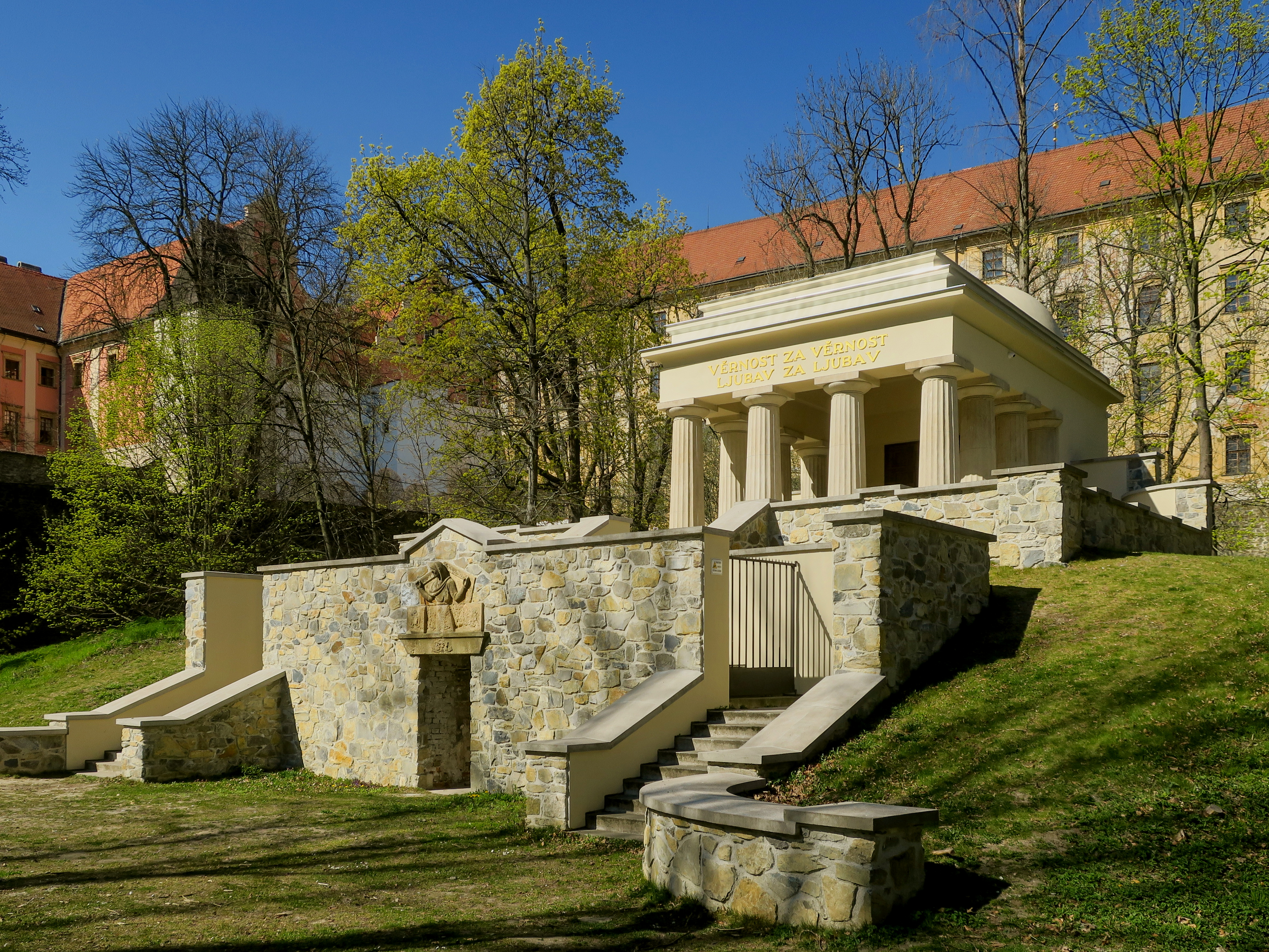
Mausoleum of Yugoslav Soldiers in Olomouc

== See also ==
- Bled agreement (1938)
- Croatia–Czech Republic relations
- Croatia–Slovakia relations
- Czechs of Croatia
- Czechs in Serbia
- Croats in Slovakia
- Slovaks of Croatia
- History of Orthodox Church of the Czech Lands and Slovakia
- Intermarium
- Macedonians in the Czech Republic
- Mausoleum of Yugoslav Soldiers in Olomouc
- Nova borba
- Prague Slavic Congress, 1848
- The Prague film school
- Serbs of Slovakia
- Slovaks in Serbia
- Slánský trial
- Dissolution of Austria-Hungary
- Death and state funeral of Josip Broz Tito
- Czech Republic – Serbia relations
- Serbia–Slovakia relations
- Czechoslovakia at the 1984 Winter Olympics
