= Embassy of Serbia, Prague =

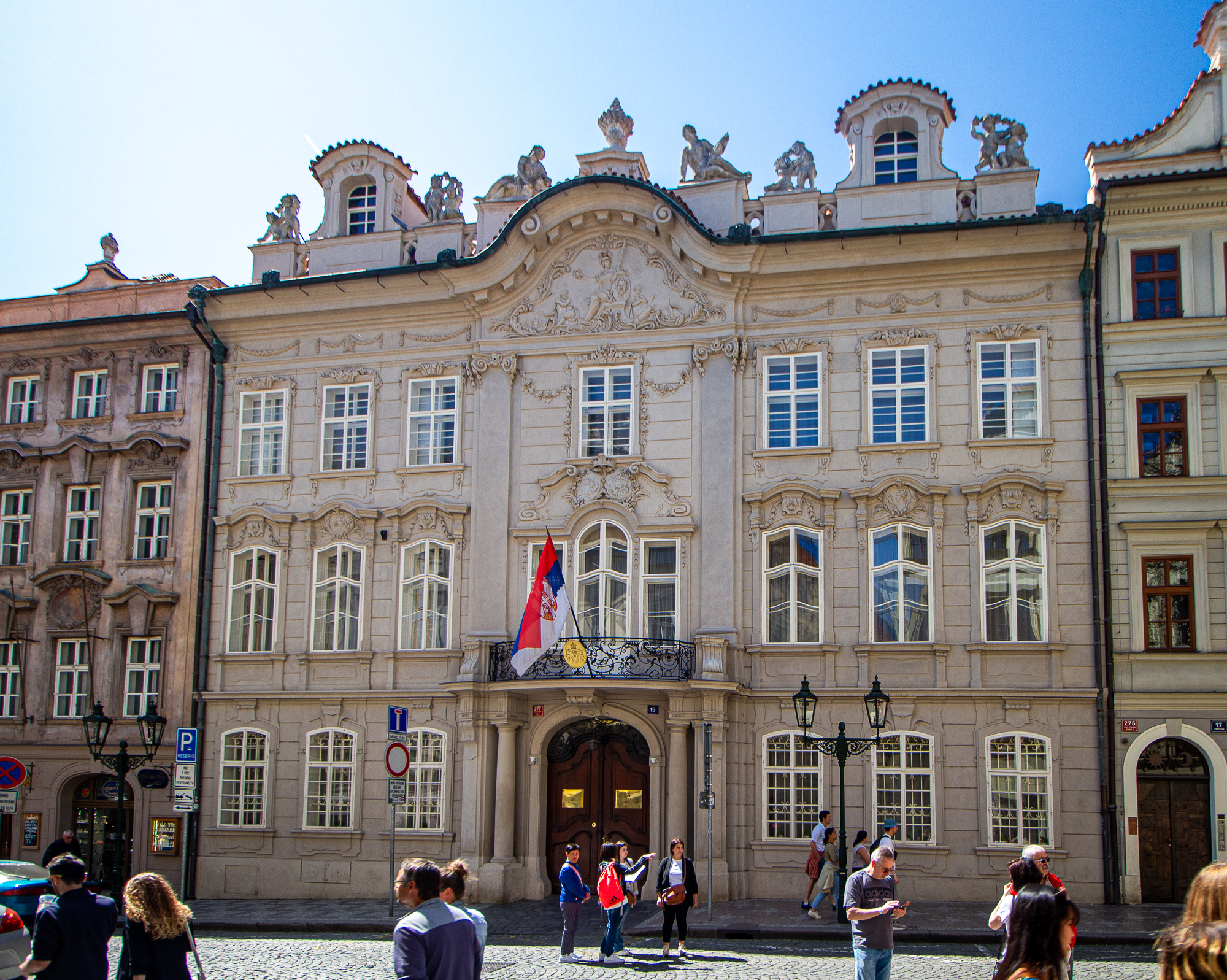
- Location: Prague, Czech Republic
- Address: Mostecká 15
- Coordinates: 50°05′14″N 14°24′20″E
- Ambassador: Berislav Vekić

The Embassy of Serbia, Prague (Czech: Velvyslanectví Srbské republiky, Serbian: Амбасада Републике Србије, romanized: Ambasada Republike Srbije) is the diplomatic mission of Serbia in the Czech Republic.

Diplomatic relations between the two states date back to the aftermath of the First World War. Following the dissolution of Austria-Hungary in 1918, the newly proclaimed First Czechoslovak Republic established Czechoslovak embassy in the newly formed Kingdom of Serbs, Croats and Slovenes (renamed the Kingdom of Yugoslavia in 1929). The Yugoslav legation in Prague was opened in the same period at prominent location in Kounický palác on Malá Strana, in the immediate vicinity of the Charles Bridge.

== History ==
=== Interwar period ===
In 1921, together with the Kingdom of Romania, Czechoslovakia and Yugoslavia established the Little Entente with the purpose of common defence against Hungarian revanchism and the prospect of a Habsburg restoration. Czechoslovakia and Yugoslavia signed their agreement on 4 June 1920.

Serbian writer, poet, translator Stanislav Vinaver was appointed press attaché at the embassy.

=== Cold War ===
The President of Yugoslavia enjoyed widespread popularity in Czechoslovakia due to his leadership of the Yugoslav Partisans during the Second World War. During his visit to Prague and Bratislava in February 1948, local authorities publicly expressed admiration for his “historic efforts to realize fraternal cooperation among all Slavic peoples.”

==== Soviet–Yugoslav split crisis 1948-1953 ====
Until the Tito–Stalin split, Yugoslavia and Czechoslovakia maintained long standing close political, economic and cultural cooperation as allied states, but following the Yugoslav split with Soviet Union, Czechoslovakia unilaterally terminated the Treaty of Friendship on 4 October 1949 with relations deteriorating sharply and remaining openly hostile until Stalin’s death in 1953. Between 1 July 1948 and 1 August 1952, forty-two Yugoslav diplomats were expelled from Czechoslovakia, with several of them, and in some cases their family members, subjected to intimidation and threats during the process.

During the crisis, the Yugoslav Embassy in Prague played central role in addressing the needs of Yugoslav citizens in Czechoslovakia. Particular attention was devoted to the sizeable community of Yugoslav university students in Prague and in other major academic centres, including Bratislava, Brno and Ostrava, where 227 Yugoslav students were enrolled at the time. Czechoslovak authorities systematically intimidated Yugoslav diplomats and citizens visiting Yugoslav missions by conducting identity checks, interrogations, and surveillance outside the Embassy in Prague and the Consulate in Bratislava. These actions, officially justified as reciprocal responses to Yugoslav treatment of Czechoslovak diplomats in Belgrade. The most drastic form of hostility was the arrest and show trial of Yugoslav vice-consul Šefik Kević, detained in March 1950 while carrying diplomatic mail and later sentenced to life imprisonment in a secret political trial on charges of espionage and smuggling.

=== Contemporary period ===
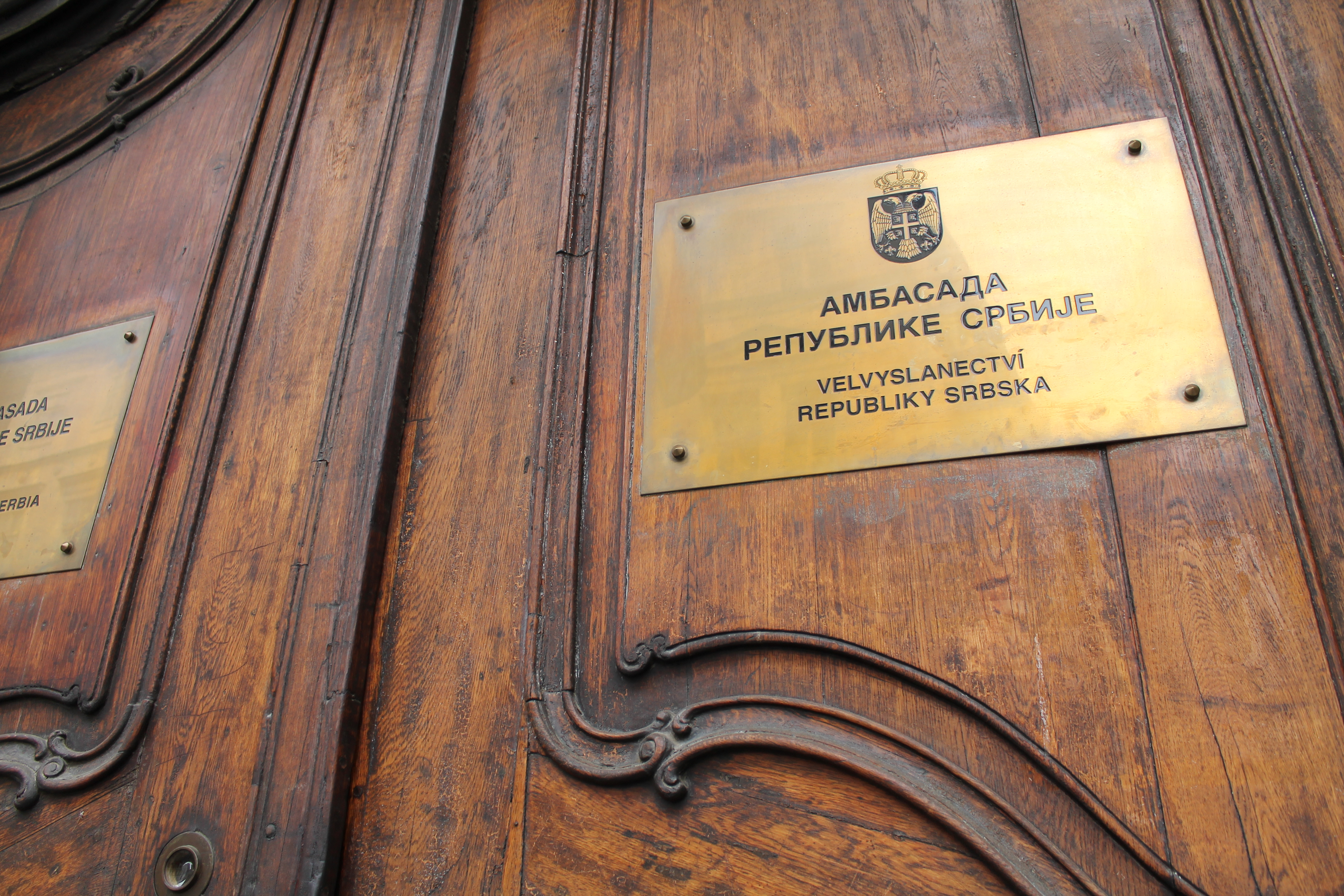
Plaque at the entrance of the Embassy

In 2024, together with the Serbian association Luka Prag, embassy organized the Month of Serbian Culture in Prague, which featured concerts, art exhibitions, culinary presentations and panel discussions highlighting Serbian cultural heritage and Serbian-Czech cultural ties. In 2026 Embassy hosted a Statehood Day reception attended by over 350 guests, including more than 60 ambassadors, senior Serbian and Czech officials, and representatives of political, economic, and cultural life. Speakers highlighted the traditionally friendly relations between Serbia and the Czech Republic.

== Embassy Building ==
Embassy of Serbia is hosted in Kounický palác, 1775 built two-story palace with decorative façade presenting stylistic transition between Rococo and Louis XVI style. The Palace is a protected cultural monument since 3 May 1958 and forms part of the UNESCO World Heritage-listed historic centre of Pragueprotected since 13 December 1992.

== See also ==
- Czech Republic–Serbia relations
  - Serbs in the Czech Republic
  - Czechs in Serbia
- Czechoslovakia–Yugoslavia relations
- Mausoleum of Yugoslav Soldiers in Olomouc
- Pan-Slavism
  - Czechoslovakism
  - Yugoslavism
  - Austro-Slavism

== General bibliography ==
- Selinić, Slobodan (2010). "Život diplomata u neprijateljskoj državi. Jugoslovenske diplomate u Čehoslovačkoj i čehoslovačke diplomate u Jugoslaviji 1949–1953" [Life Of The Diplomats In Enemy State Yugoslav Diplomats In Czechoslovakia And Czechoslovak Diplomats In Yugoslavia 1949–1953] (PDF). Istorija 20. veka (in Serbian) (2). Institute of Contemporary History, Belgrade: 53-66.
