= Embassy of the Czech Republic, Belgrade =

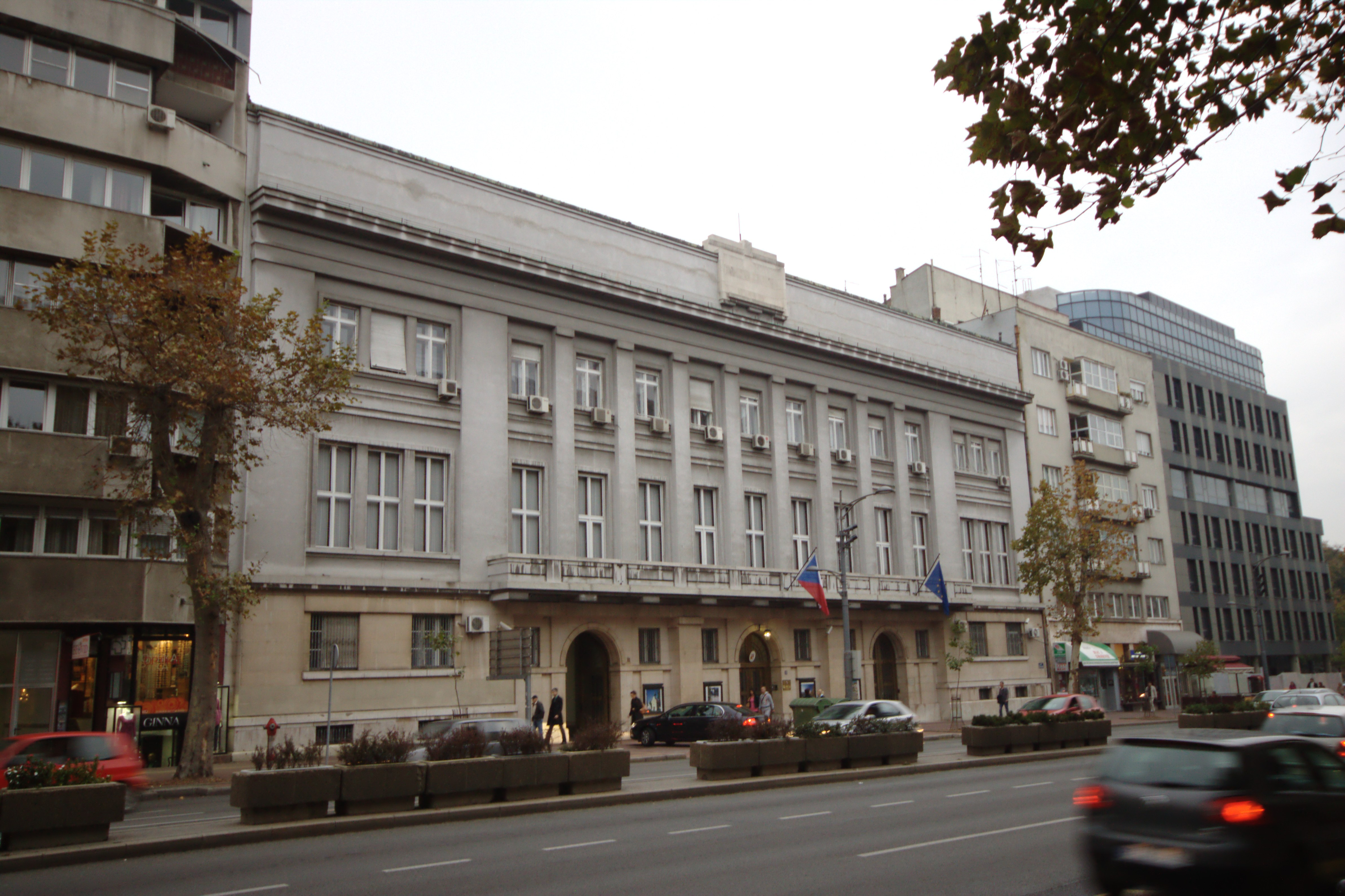
- Location: Belgrade, Serbia
- Address: Bulevar kralja Aleksandra 22
- Coordinates: 44°48′35″N 20°28′00″E

The Embassy of the Czech Republic in Belgrade (Czech: Velvyslanectví České republiky v Bělehradu, Serbian: Амбасада Чешке Републике у Београду, romanized: Ambasada Češke Republike u Beogradu) is the diplomatic mission of the Czech Republic to Serbia, located in Belgrade.

Diplomatic relations between the two states date back to the aftermath of the World War I. Following the dissolution of Austria-Hungary in 1918, the newly proclaimed First Czechoslovak Republic established its embassy in the newly formed Kingdom of Serbs, Croats and Slovenes (renamed the Kingdom of Yugoslavia in 1929).

The Czechoslovak legation was situated at one of the most prominent locations in central Belgrade, near the House of the National Assembly, St. Mark's Church, and Tašmajdan Park. Reciprocally, the Yugoslav kingdom established its diplomatic mission in Prague. The two new multinational Slavic states used this to demonstrate their strong alliance and friendship. Today, the building in Prague serves as the Embassy of Serbia in the Czech Republic, while the building in Belgrade serves as the Embassy of the Czech Republic in Serbia.

== History ==
The design for the embassy building was completed in Prague in 1920 at the request of the Czechoslovak Ministry of Foreign Affairs. The land for the new building was purchased in 1923, and the foundation stone was laid on Saint Václav in 1925. In 1927, King Alexander I of Yugoslavia donated additional state-owned land across the street from the Assembly of Yugoslavia to Czechoslovak president Tomáš Masaryk for the construction of the embassy building.

The new cubist and functionalist embassy building project was developed by the Czechoslovak state architect Alois Mezera. The building was decorated with artworks including paintings by Max Švabinský. Madeleine Albright, who would later be the first woman to hold the position of United States Secretary of State, spent her first months at the embassy, where her father served as a press-attaché. After the occupation of Czechoslovakia in the spring of 1939, the Czechoslovak legation ceased to perform its functions, and the building and its furnishings were handed over to the German Ministry of Foreign Affairs.

After the invasion of Yugoslavia by the Axis powers, the country signed a capitulation on April 17, 1941, in the building's dining room.

== See also ==
- Czech Republic–Serbia relations
  - Serbs in the Czech Republic
  - Czechs in Serbia
- Czechoslovakia–Yugoslavia relations
- Mausoleum of Yugoslav Soldiers in Olomouc
- Pan-Slavism
  - Czechoslovakism
  - Yugoslavism
  - Austro-Slavism
