= Serbs in the Czech Republic =

Srbové v Česku Срби у Чешкој Srbi u Češkoj

Total population
- 4,101 (2021)

Regions with significant populations
- Prague, Central Bohemian Region

Languages
- Czech and Serbian

Religion
- Eastern Orthodoxy

Related ethnic groups
- Serbs in Slovakia

Serbs are a recognized ethnic minority in the Czech Republic. According to data from the 2021 census, 4,101 Serbs live in the Czech Republic, of which 1,187 declared their Serb ethnicity in combination with another ethnicity. (Note: 2,914 declared exclusive Serb ethnicity while 1,187 declared it in combination with another ethnicity) Although Serbs are recognized as an autochthonous ethnic group in Czech Republic, they almost exclusively consist of recent immigrants and expatriates.

== History ==
The village of Srbsko near Karlštejn near Prague was probably founded in the middle of the 14th century by Serb immigrants, most likely members and descendants of a military delegation (the poklisar and his entourage) sent by the Emperor Stefan Dušan to the Holy Roman Emperor Charles IV.

At the second half of the 19th century, numerous students from the Kingdom of Serbia came study at the Charles University in Prague. In 1903, the Association of Serbian Students Šumadija was established.

During the World War I, there were several Austro-Hungarian prisoner of war camps in the territory of present-day Czech Republic, the largest was the camp in Jindřichovice near Sokolov. About 40,000 prisoners passed through the camp of which significant part consisted of the soldiers of the Serbian Army. According to some estimates, as many as 8,700 Serbs died there, mainly due to epidemics of typhus.

During the war, the Serb nationalist Gavrilo Princip, who assassinated Archduke Franz Ferdinand of Austria, was imprisoned in Terezín. Princip died after nearly four years in the prison of tuberculosis.

During the 1920s and 1930s, the shared Slavic identity and political ties between Czechoslovakia and the Kingdom of Yugoslavia encouraged the first wave of migration: several hundred Serbian students came to study at Charles University in Prague, while young workers and intellectuals settled in industrial cities like Ostrava and Plzeň.

== Culture ==
Serbian language is one of recognized minority languages in Czech Republic. Serbs have the right to use the Serbian language in communication with Czech authorities and government according to the Charter of Fundamental Rights and Basic Freedoms of the Czech Republic.

== Heritage ==
There are two important Serbian heritage sites in the Czech Republic, both connected to the World War I. The Memorial Ossuary and the Serbian Military Cemetery, both in Jindřichovice, were erected in 1931, to house the remains of Serbian prisoners of wars from the World War I. Approximately 7,100 were buried in the common ossuary while 1,600 of them were buried in the military cemetery.

The Mausoleum of Yugoslav Soldiers in Olomouc is a Neoclassical chapel with an ossuary containing remains of 7,378 mostly Serbian soldiers killed in World War I. It was built in 1926 and reconstructed in 2020.

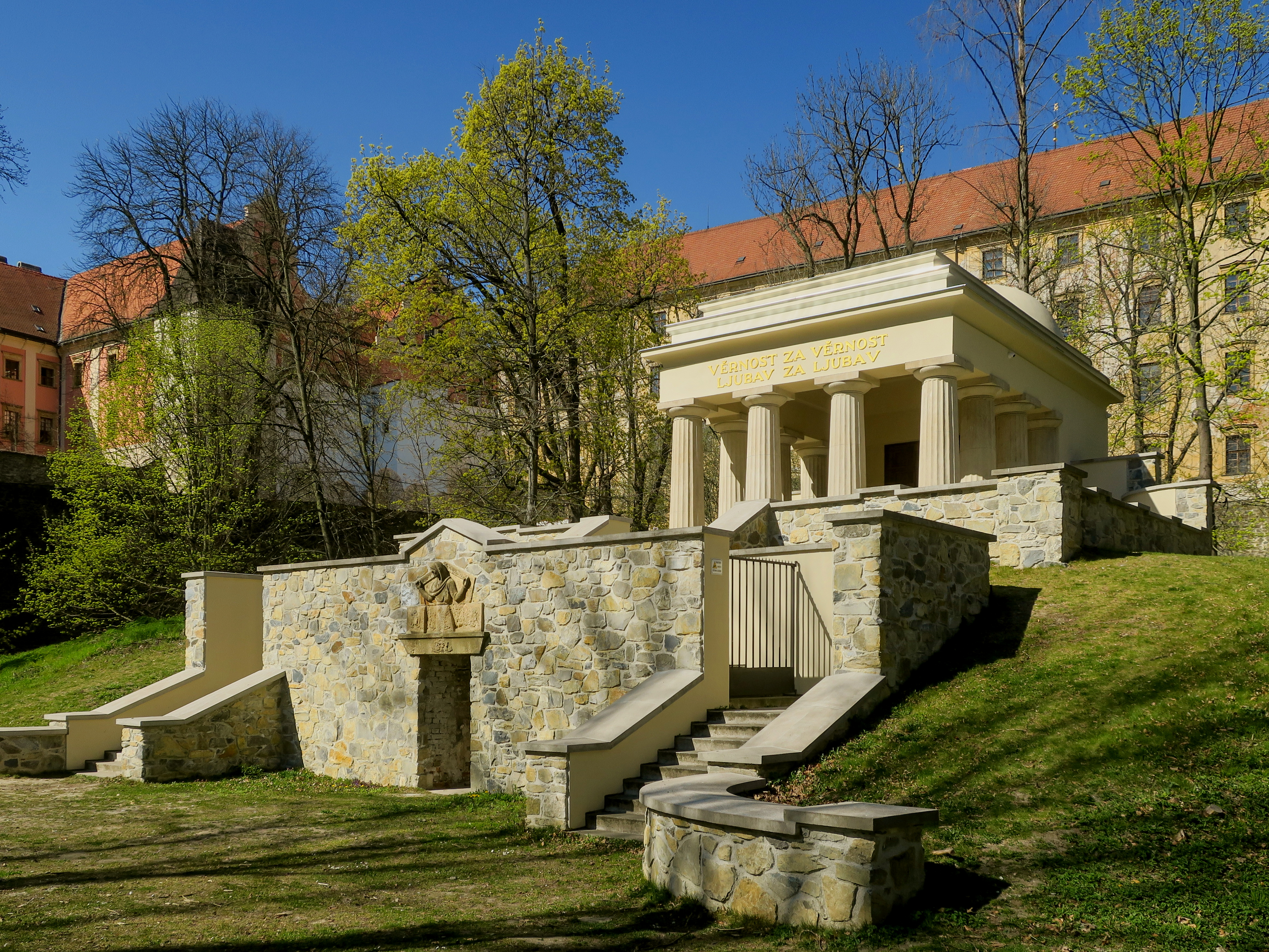
Mausoleum of Yugoslav Soldiers in Olomouc

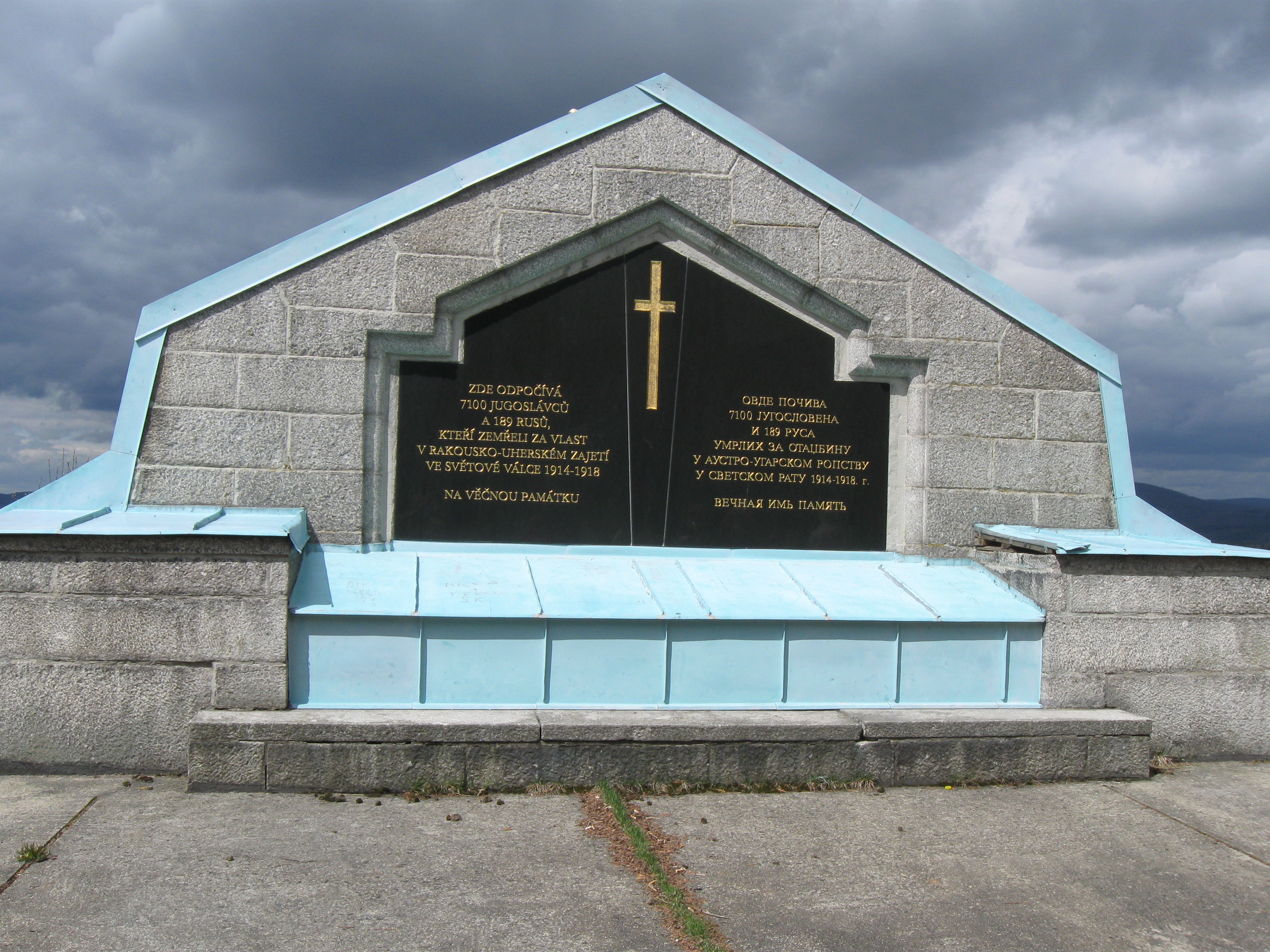
Memorial Ossuary in Jindřichovice

== Notable people ==
- Jaroslav Foldyna – politician
- Stefan Simić – football player
- Alexandra Udženija – politician, Mayor of Prague 2

== See also ==
- Immigration to the Czech Republic
- Serb diaspora
- Czech Republic–Serbia relations
