= 1969 Non-Aligned Consultative Meeting =

1969 Belgrade Non-Aligned Consultative Meeting

- Host country: Yugoslavia
- Date: 8–12 July 1969
- Cities: Belgrade
- Chair: Josip Broz Tito (President of Yugoslavia)

1969 Non-Aligned Movement Consultative Meeting took place in Belgrade, SR Serbia, SFR Yugoslavia on 8–12 July following the Warsaw Pact invasion of Czechoslovakia in August 1968. Discussion about non-interventionism was prioritised by the host nation, whilst discussion over national liberation caused some divisions. Algeria requesting their full participation, but only the Palestine Liberation Organization was granted the right to participate on an equal footing. Algeria in turn blocked a Yugoslav proposal to admit countries in military pacts but pursuing non-alignment such as: the Socialist Republic of Romania and Czechoslovak Socialist Republic in the Soviet-led Warsaw Pact; and Malaysia, Singapore, Tunisia and Pakistan in either the Western-led Baghdad Pact or Southeast Asia Treaty Organization.

On 7 February 1969, President of Yugoslavia Josip Broz Tito announced the Yugoslav intention to organize the conference in the presence of the President of Egypt Gamal Abdel Nasser and after consultations with India, Indonesia, Afghanistan, Ethiopia and Egypt. 51 nations participated in the final session of the meeting, with delegations from Chad and Sierra Leone arriving late.

== See also ==
- Foreign relations of Yugoslavia
- Soviet Union–Yugoslavia relations
- Czechoslovakia–Yugoslavia relations
