= Serbia–Slovakia relations =

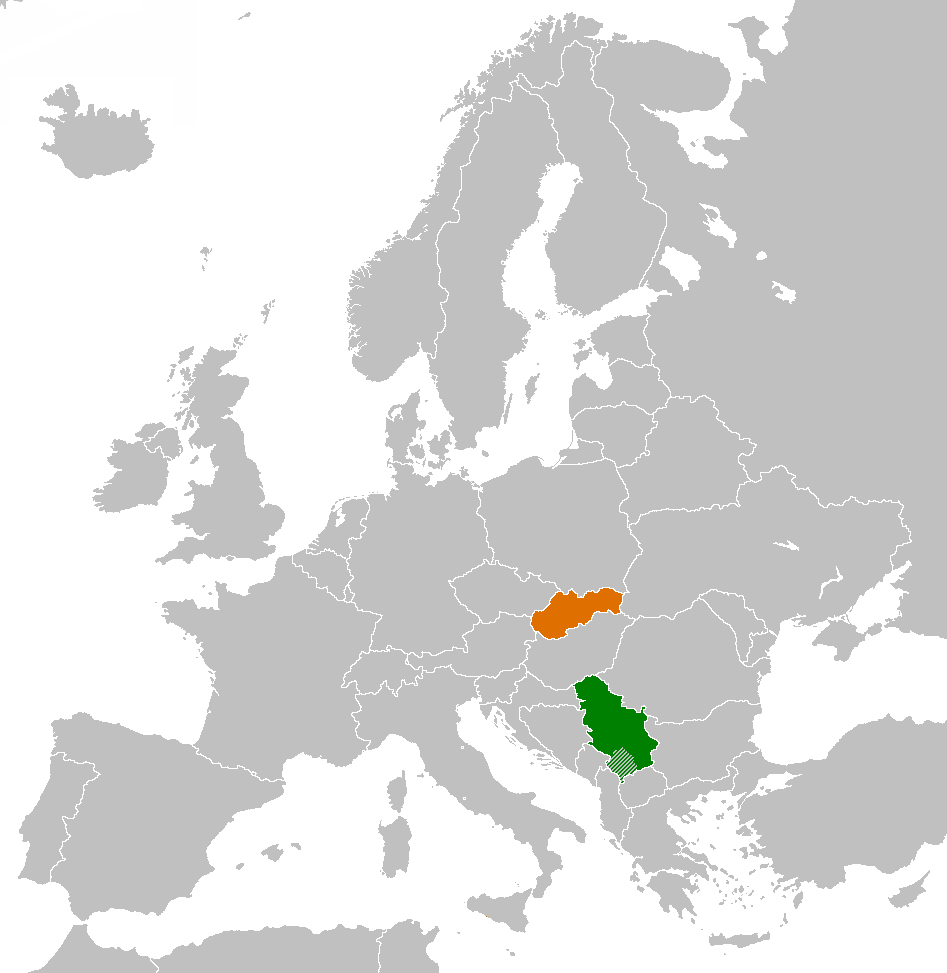
- Serbia: Slovakia

Serbia and Slovakia maintain diplomatic relations established between Slovakia and the Federal Republic of Yugoslavia (of which Serbia is considered sole legal successor) in 1993.

== History ==
Serbian-Slovak relations i.e. cooperation were notably strong during the 18th and the 19th century, in the fields of culture, art, commerce, education, science, politics and military.

During the course of two centuries, more than 2,500 Serbs were educated in various universities and higher institutions of learning in Slovakia, mostly in Bratislava, Košice and Kežmarok.

Noted Slovaks were active in the cultural and political life of Serbia, such as Pavel Jozef Šafárik, Ján Kollár and Ľudovít Štúr. Under the influence and drawing on the works of Serbian linguist Vuk Stefanović Karadžić, Pavel Jozef Šafárik and Jan Kollár decided to start collecting Slovak folk poems. During the 19th century, Serbian nationalists and Slovak nationalists supported each other and were active in spreading the ideas based on Slavophilia.

Historian and an expert on Serb-Slovak relations Nebojša Kuzmanović concludes that Serbs had the best relations with Slovaks out of any ethnic group the Serbs encountered with throughout their history.

Serbian author and historian Risto Kovijanić researched Serbian-Slovak relations for over 50 years and published a number of works on the topic.

== Political relations ==
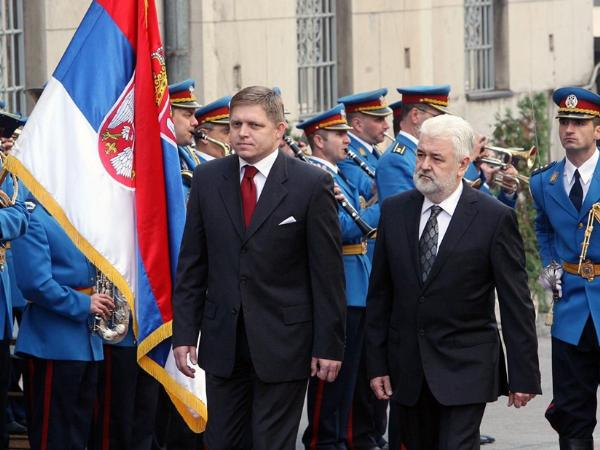
Prime ministers Robert Fico with Mirko Cvetković, 2009

Of all EU and NATO members, Slovakia is (alongside Greece, Romania, and Hungary), the one with the most positive relations with Serbia.

In 2021 President of Serbia Aleksandar Vučić and Minister of Foreign Affairs Nikola Selaković held a meeting with Slovak Minister of Foreign and European Affairs Ivan Korčok. Minister Juraj Blanár visited Belgrade in 2024.

=== Slovak stance on Kosovo ===
Slovakia is one of five member states of the European Union (other being Greece, Cyprus, Romania and Spain) that does not recognize unilateral declaration of independence of Kosovo and is actively opposing its membership in international organisations such as Council of Europe and Interpol.

== Economic relations ==
Trade between two countries amounted to $1.1 billion in 2023; Serbia's merchandise export to Slovakia were about $673 million; Slovak exports were standing at $422 million.

Slovak companies present in Serbia include Tatravagonka poprad (railway freight carriages plant in Subotica) and MSM Group (machinery plant 14. Oktobar in Kruševac).

== Serbs in Slovakia ==
Serbs in Slovakia are recognized as an ethnic minority group. There is a small number of them, mostly located in the southern town of Komárno, where they have been living since the 17th century.

== Slovaks in Serbia ==
Slovaks in Serbia are a recognized ethnic minority group. They number 41,730, constituting 0.63% of the country's population. They mainly live in Vojvodina (39,807), where they constitute the third largest ethnic minority group after Hungarians and Roma people. There are two municipalities with absolute or relative Slovak majorities: Bački Petrovac (with 60% Slovaks) and Kovačica (with 41% Slovaks), which is also the southernmost Slovak-majority settlement in the world.

== Resident diplomatic missions ==
- Serbia has an embassy in Bratislava.
- Slovakia has an embassy in Belgrade.

== See also ==
- Foreign relations of Serbia
- Foreign relations of Slovakia
- Czechoslovakia–Yugoslavia relations
