= Czech Corridor =

Proposed corridor running from Yugoslavia to Czechoslovakia

Proposed corridor Dashed line – Burgenland today

The Czech Corridor (Czech and Slovak: Český koridor) or Czechoslovak Corridor (Czech and Slovak: Československý koridor) was a failed proposal during the Paris Peace Conference of 1919 in the aftermath of World War I and the breakup of Austria-Hungary. The proposal would have carved out a strip of land between Austria and Hungary to serve as a corridor between two newly formed Slavic countries with shared interests, the Kingdom of Serbs, Croats and Slovenes (Yugoslavia) and Czechoslovakia. A different name often given is Czech–Yugoslav Territorial Corridor. It is primarily referred to as "the Czech Corridor" today, because representatives of Yugoslavia at the Peace Conference stated that they would prefer it if the corridor were to be controlled solely by Czechoslovaks. The proposal was ultimately rejected by the conference and never again suggested.

== Territory ==
The corridor would have consisted of Burgenland and neighboring areas that would be found along the future border of Austria and Hungary. The area is sometimes called Western Transdanubia. In a February 1916 memorandum to the French government, Tomáš Masaryk stated that the corridor would correct "the division of the Czechoslovaks and Yugoslavs" (i.e. West Slavs and South Slavs), arising from the 9th century Hungarian invasion.

The planned corridor would have been some 200 kilometers long and at most 80 kilometers wide. It would have cut through four Hungarian counties (Moson, Sopron, Vas and Zala). However, there exist variant proposals that would have made the area significantly larger.

== History ==
Czechoslovak delegates used the principle of self-determination, which was used as legitimate basis for creation of many nation states in Europe after World War I, as an argument for the creation of the corridor; however it is unlikely that the proposal would have been accepted on that principle, since of the 1.17 million people that lived in the area at the time, some 662,000 were ethnic Germans, 220,000 were Slavs (mostly Croats and Slovenes) and 289,000 belonged to other ethnolinguistic groups (mostly Hungarians). They further argued that the corridor would by virtue also connect the Germans in Southeastern Europe (Danube Swabians) with Central Europe. They also mentioned that this would benefit France's influence in the region. Today, however, European historians speculate that it was planned to give Czechoslovakia a larger share of land along the Danube in order to turn Pozsony/Pressburg/Prešporok (shortly thereafter renamed to modern Bratislava) into a major Danube harbor; this would have marginalized Hungary even more than it already was following the collapse of Austria-Hungary. The Czechoslovak delegates claimed that the city was the ancient capital, omitting the fact that the very multicultural city was also the royal capital of the Kingdom of Hungary for two and a half centuries and had a large German and Hungarian populace.

The proposal was backed by supporters of pan-Slavic ideologies as it would have created a joint border between two states that represented Slavic unity (Czechoslovakia and Yugoslavia) – an idea that was also defended by Croatian nationalists who wanted the Burgenland Croats to be part of the Yugoslav state. They argued that since Austria-Hungary no longer existed, there was no reason for Austria and Hungary to share a border and the creation of such a corridor would discourage both countries from harboring any thoughts of future alliance.

== See also ==
- Czechoslovakia–Yugoslavia relations
