= Czechs in Serbia =

Чеси у Србији Česi v Srbsku
- Coat of arms of the National Council of the Czech Ethnic Minority in Serbia

Total population
- 1,317 (2022)

Languages
- Serbian and Czech

Religion
- Catholicism

Related ethnic groups
- Slovaks in Serbia

Czechs are recognized ethnic minority in Serbia. According to data from the 2022 census, there were 1,317 Czechs living in Serbia.

== Demographics ==
The only settlement with Czech majority is tiny village Češko Selo ("Czech Village") in the Bela Crkva municipality, in South Banat District, Vojvodina.

Year	Population
1948	6,760
1953	5,948
1961	5,133
1971	4,149
1981	3,225
1991	2,675
2002 (excl. Kosovo)	2,211
2011 (excl. Kosovo)	1,824
2022 (excl. Kosovo)	1,317

== Politics ==
The National Council of Czech Ethnic Minority in Serbia is a representation body of Czechs, established for the protection of the rights and the minority self-government of Czechs in Serbia. It is headquartered in Bela Crkva.

== Notable people ==
- Aleksandar Mašin – military officer
- Ivan Bek – football player
- Ludmila Frajt – composer
- Emil Hájek – composer and pianist
- Rudolf Nováček – composer
- Zlatko Krasni – poet
- Aleksandar Lifka – cinematographer
- Stojan Titelbah – architect
- Vladislav Titelbah – painter
- František Zach – general and Chief of the Serbian General Staff

== See also ==
- Czech diaspora
- Czech Republic–Serbia relations
