= Croatia–Slovakia relations =

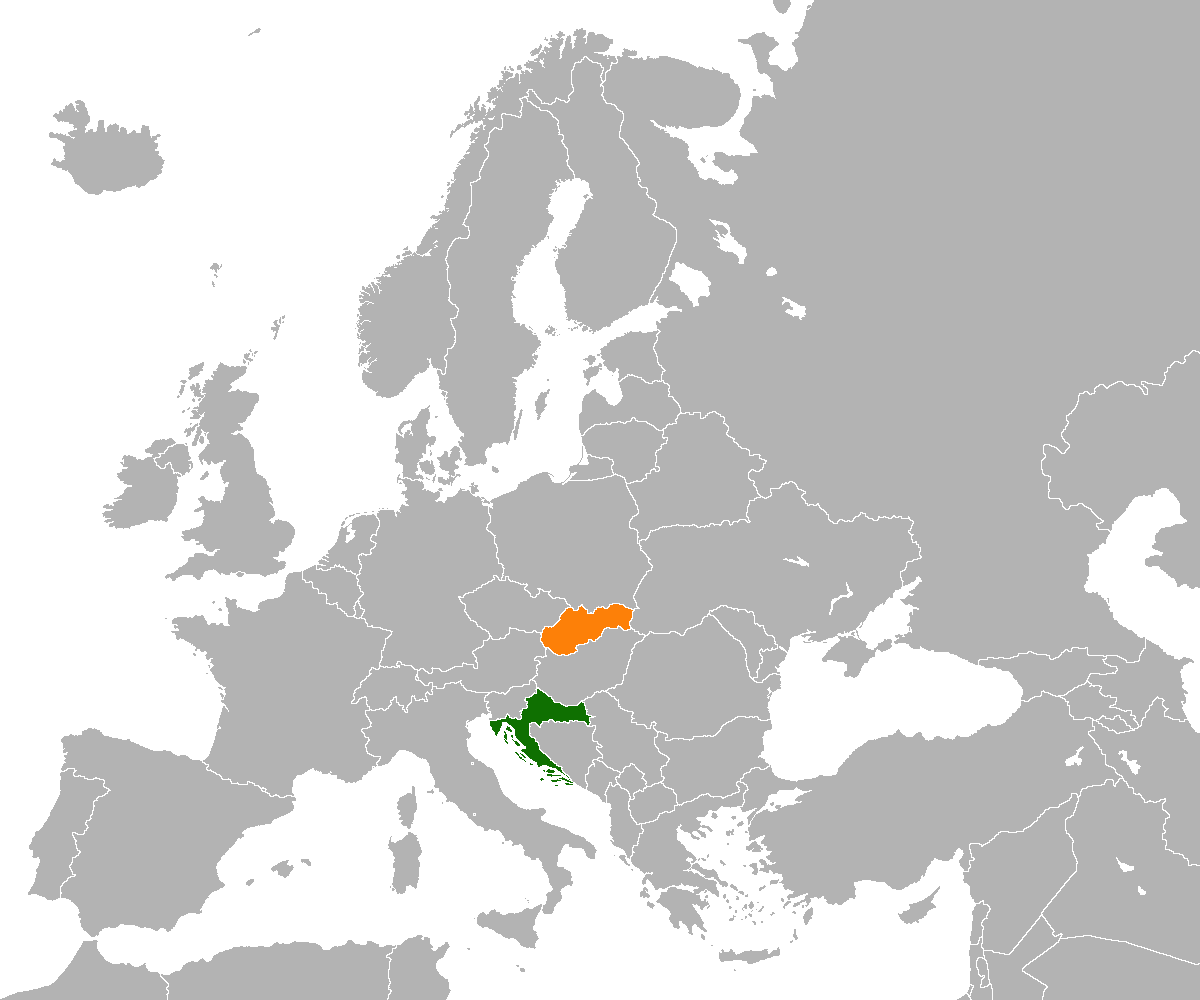

- Croatia: Slovakia

Croatia–Slovakia relations are foreign relations between Croatia and Slovakia. Croatia has an embassy in Bratislava. Slovakia has an embassy in Zagreb and honorary consulates in Osijek and Split.

Both countries are full members of the Council of Europe, the European Union and NATO.

On 1 July 2025, the prime ministers of both nations met in Zagreb.

Croatia and Slovakia are strengthening even further, and building on historical ties and friendship, Prime Minister Andrej Plenković said after a meeting with his Slovak counterpart Robert Fico. He added that they used the meeting to reiterate their support for Ukraine, which is a victim of Russian aggression.

PM Plenković particularly emphasized the trade exchange, which has made great progress and now amounts to more than 1.5 billion euros and is a pledge of strengthening economic relations.

== History ==
Czechoslovakia recognized Croatia on 16 January 1992. After dissolution of Czechoslovakia, Croatia and newly established Slovakia mutually recognized and established diplomatic relations on 1 January 1993.

== Resident diplomatic missions ==
- Croatia has an embassy in Bratislava.
- Slovakia has an embassy in Zagreb.
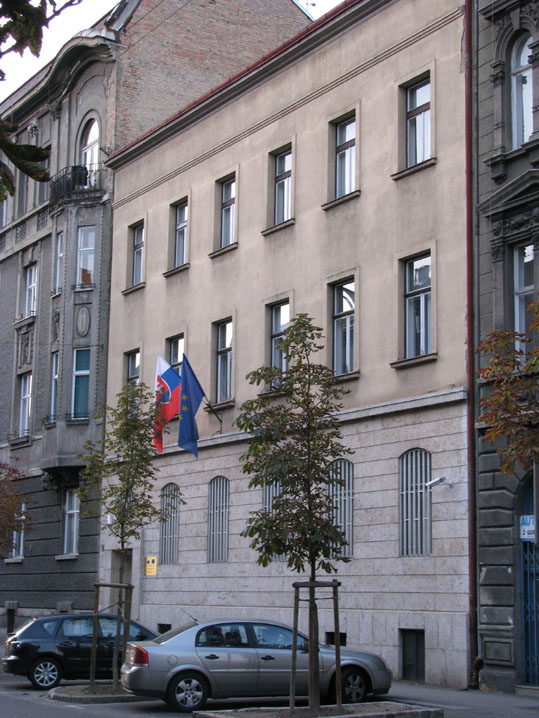
Embassy of Slovakia in Zagreb

== See also ==
- Foreign relations of Croatia
- Foreign relations of Slovakia
- Czechoslovakia–Yugoslavia relations
- Croats in Slovakia
- Slovaks of Croatia
