= Zlatko Krasni =

Serbian poet (1951–2008)

Zlatko Krasni (Serbian: Златко Красни, (born 1951, Sarajevo, Yugoslavia—died 31 October 2008) was a Serbian poet of Czech origin who resided in Belgrade for most of his life. He held a BA and an MA in Germanic Languages from the Philology College of the University of Belgrade.

== Works ==
Krasni has won the prize of the Serbian Academy of Sciences and Arts and was a guest at the Literarisches Colloquium Berlin in 2005. One of Krasni's poems is quoted by defenders of the former Serbian dictator Slobodan Milosevic's admirers in Serbia.
