= Croats in Slovakia =

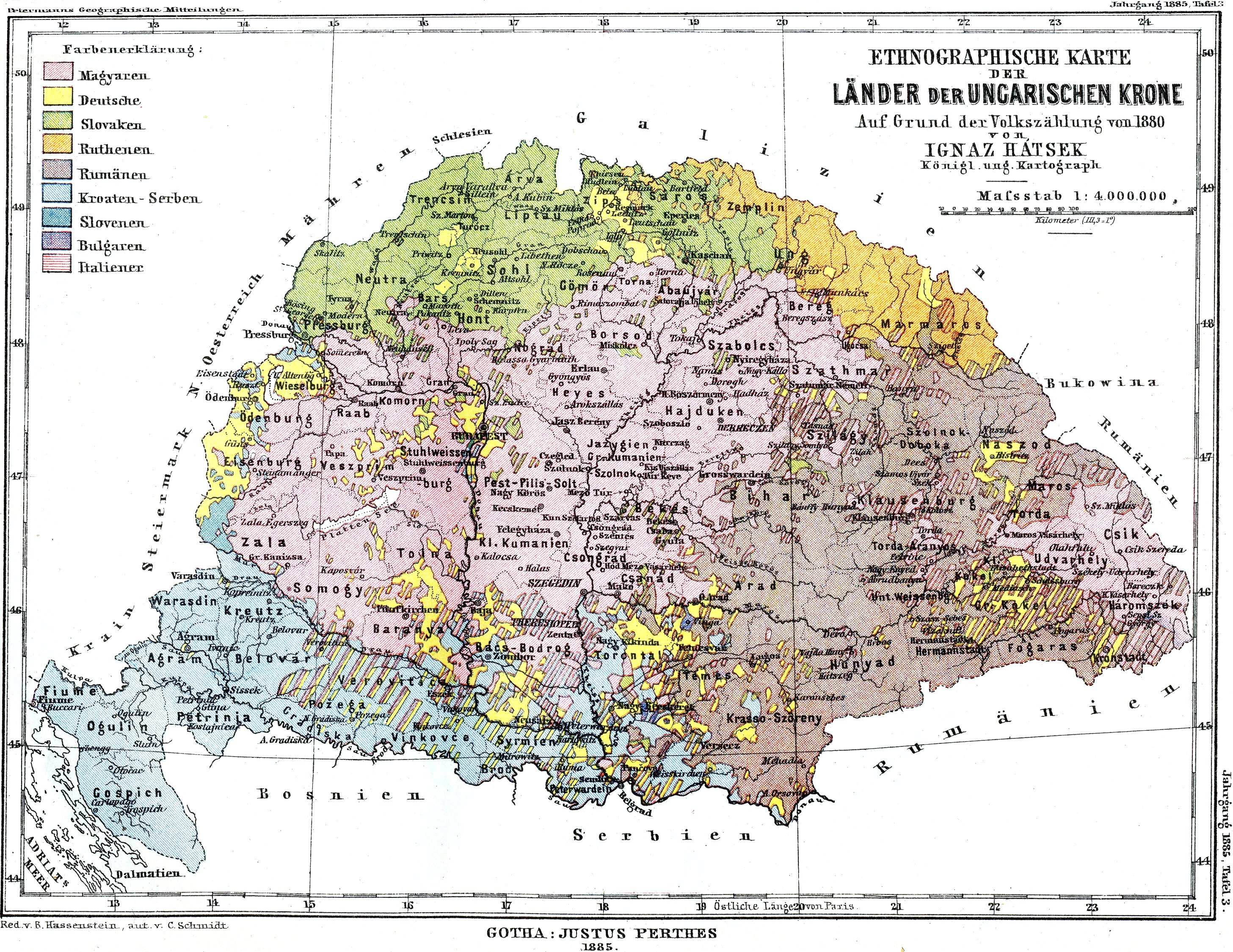
Old ethnic map of the Hungarian Kingdom with the census results from 1880. The Croatian-populated areas around Bratislava (Pressburg) are also represented

The Croats (Croatian: Hrvati; Slovak: Chorváti) are an ethnic minority in Slovakia, numbering 850 people according to the 2001 census, although the relatively compact patriotic Croatian community may number as many as 3500 people. The Croatian minority has a member in the Slovak Council for Minorities.

== Populated areas ==
Croats mainly live in the Bratislava Region. They went there during the Ottoman wars in Croatia, with most arriving between 1530 and 1570. This emigration started after the Battle of Mohács in 1528, with most of the migrants coming from the Sisak region, Kostajnica, Čazma, Križevci, Slunj, and Slavonia.

Traditionally Croat-populated villages in Slovakia are Chorvátsky Grob (Hrvatski Grob), Čunovo, Devínska Nová Ves (Devinsko Novo Selo), Rusovce (Rosvar) and Jarovce (Hrvatski Jandrof).

== Culture ==
Croatian organisations in Slovakia include the Croatian Cultural Alliance (Croatian: Hrvatski kulturni savez u Slovačkoj) as well as several smaller folklore groups. Alliance organizes Croatian festival in Devinsko Novo Selo, with concerts, exhibitions and gastronomy. The writer of the first Croatian-Slovak dictionary, Ferdinand Takač is a Croat from Chorvátsky Grob. There is also the Museum of Croatian Culture in Slovakia in Devínska Nová Ves.

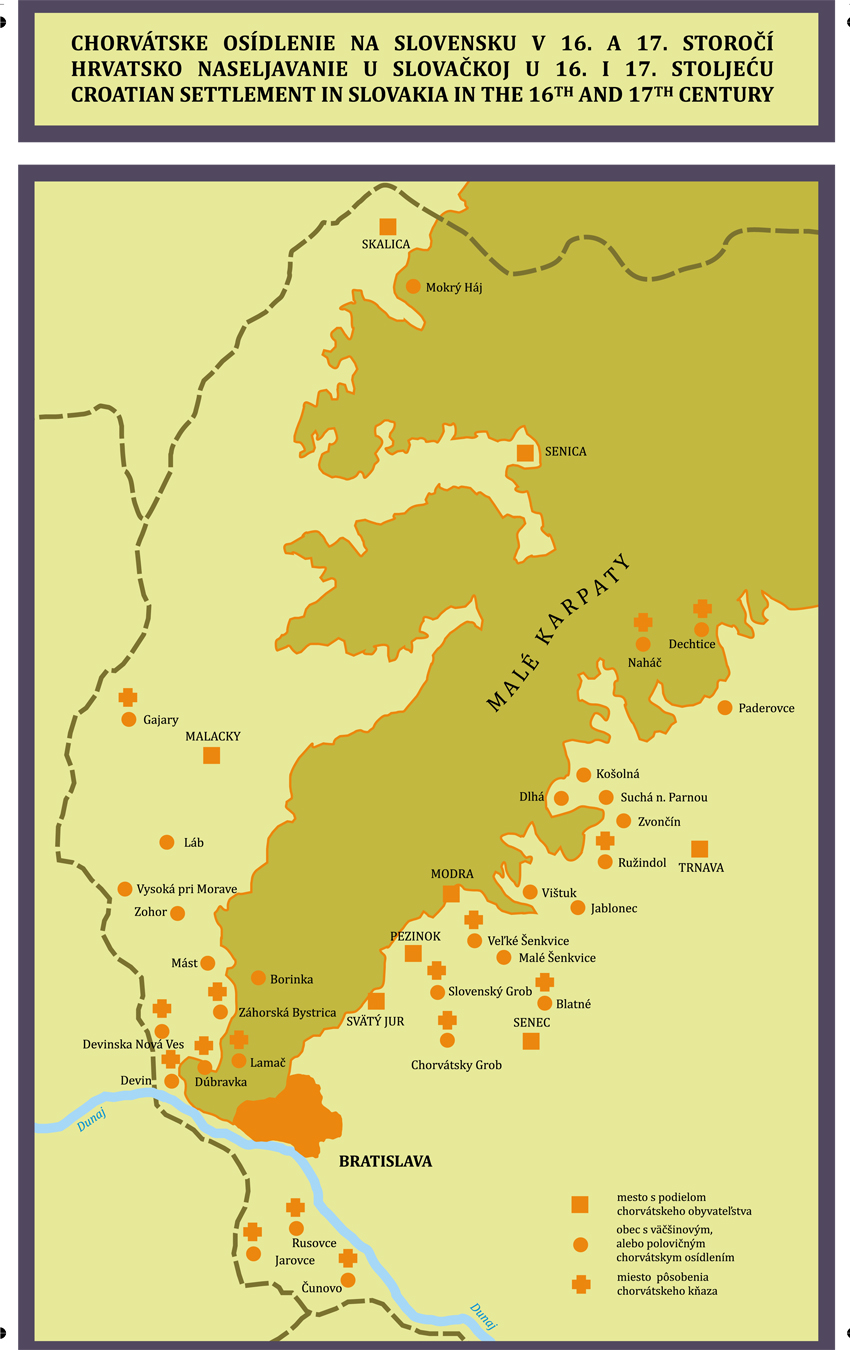
Croatian settlement in Slovakia in the 16th and 17th century

Since Slovak independence, the Croats of Slovakia have maintained good ties with other autochthonous Croatian communities in Austria, the Czech Republic and Hungary.

== Famous people ==
The former President of Slovakia Ivan Gašparovič is of Croat descent.

== See also ==
- Croatia–Slovakia relations
- Demographics of Slovakia
- Croats
- List of Croats
- Slovaks of Croatia
