= Rudolf Nováček =

Czech conductor, violinist and composer (1860–1929)

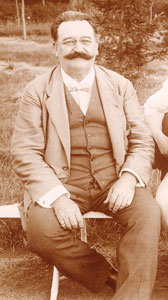
- Born: Rudolf Nováček; 7 April 1860; Bela Crkva, Austrian Empire
- Died: 11 August 1929 (aged 69); Prague, Czechoslovakia
- Occupations: Composer, conductor

Rudolf Nováček (7 April 1860 – 11 August 1929) was a Czech composer, military conductor, and pedagogue.

== Life and career ==
Rudolf Nováček was born to the conductor Martin Nováček and Maria Hildebrand in the village of Bela Crkva (now Serbia). His younger brothers were the musicians Ottokar, Karel and Victor who with their father toured as the Nováček Family String Quartet.

Rudolf Nováček studied at the Timișoara music school and then the Vienna Conservatory. He became conductor of 11th Battalion in the Austro-Hungarian Army and then a member of 12th Battalion. In 1884 he joined the Artistic Organization in Prague along with other significant Czech composers such as Antonín Dvořák, Zdeněk Fibich and Karel Bendl.

In 1890 he became bandleader of the 1st Cavalry Regiment in Sofia and then from 1891 until 1895 in the Romanian Royal Guard in Bucharest. He worked as conductor and music teacher in many cities in Russia, Belgium, Netherlands and Germany.

After the creation of Czechoslovakia, he had to become the director of the military school of the Czechoslovak Army. He died in 1929 in Prague after an operation.

== Major works ==
=== Marches ===
- Pochod 74. pluku (74er Defilier Marsch)
- Benedek Jubiläums Marsch, 1879
- Defilir-March, op. 25
- Castaldo, op. 40, named after commander of 28th Battalion Ludwig Castaldo (1839–1910), one of the well-known marches in Central Europe
- Náš druhý milion, 1891
- Na zdar naší výstavě
- My plzeňští hoši
- Koridor Marsch
- Pochod generála Laudona (General Laudon Marsch)
- Kde domov můj
- Pozdrav ze Sofie
- Pochod našich hochů
- Kardief
- Pochod ministra Národní obrany
- Na prej
- Ahoj!

=== Dance music ===
- Kouzlo květů, polka française
- Hygea, polka
- Velebínka, polka
- Ples juristů, polka
- Pohádková kouzla, waltz
- Mezi bratry, polka mazur
- České album taneční, waltz

=== Other compositions ===
- Osm pamětních lístků, Op. 1
- Little Suite for Piano (collection Young Czech pianist)
- Sonata for Violin
- Concerto for Violin
- Romance for Cello and Piano, 1889
- Sinfonietta for Wind Instruments 1888
- Othello, prelude
