= Slovaks of Croatia =

Slovaks of Croatia Slovaci u Hrvatskoj Slováci v Chorvátsku
Total population
- 4,753 (0.11%)

Languages
- Croatian, Slovak

Religion
- Roman Catholic, Protestantism

Related ethnic groups
- Czechs, Slovaks

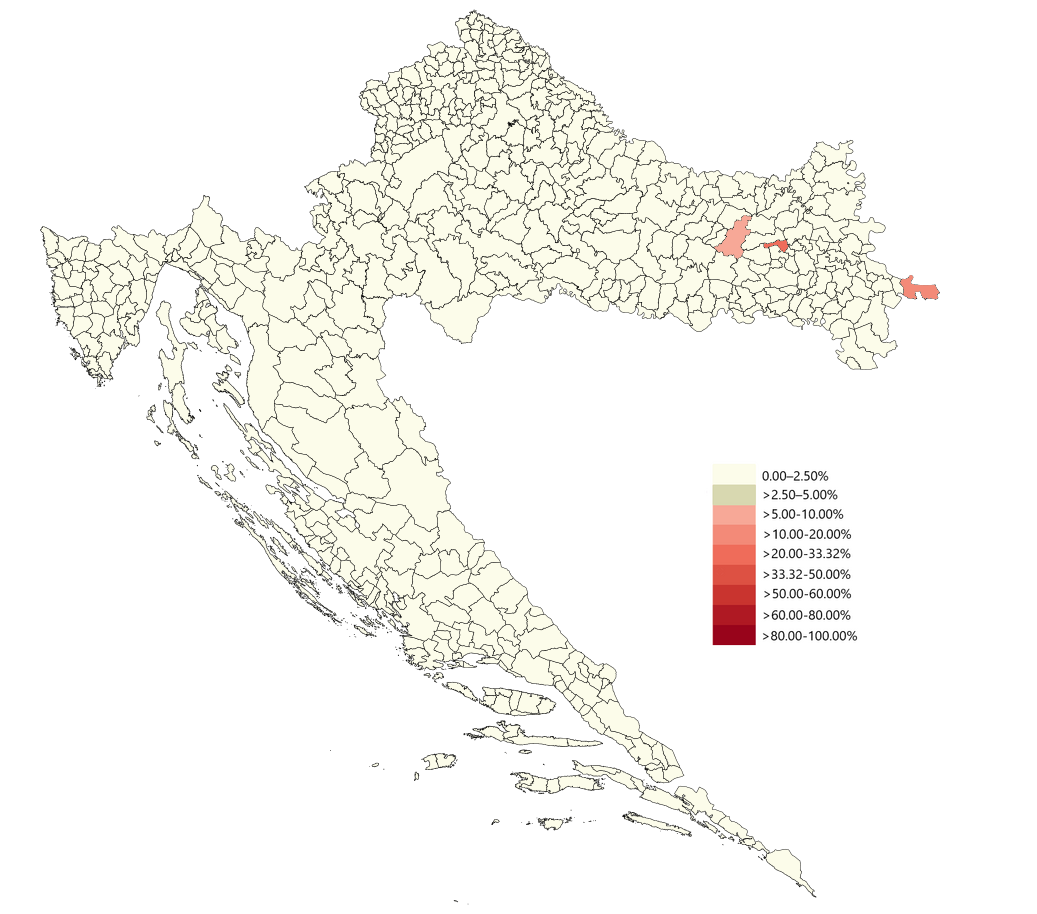
Slovaks in Croatia, according to the 2021 Croatian census

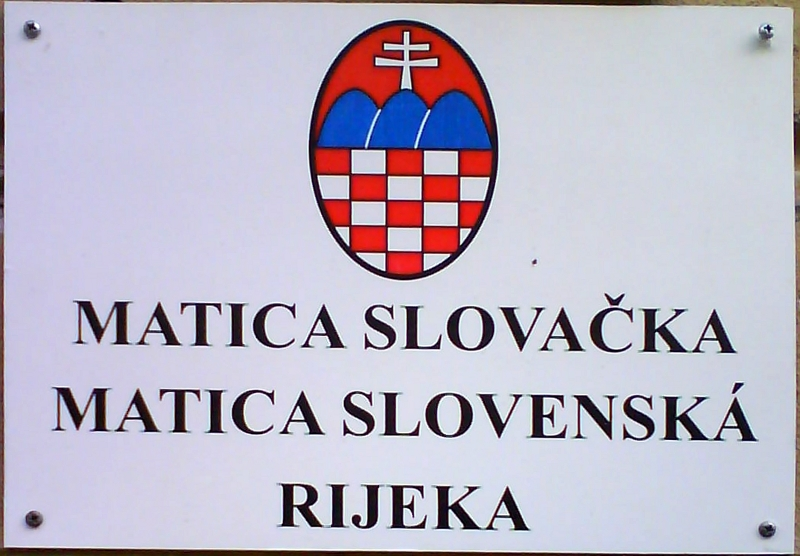
Association of Slovaks in Rijeka

Slovaks are one of the recognized autochthonous minorities of Croatia. According to 2011 census, there were 4,753 Slovaks in the country.

== History ==
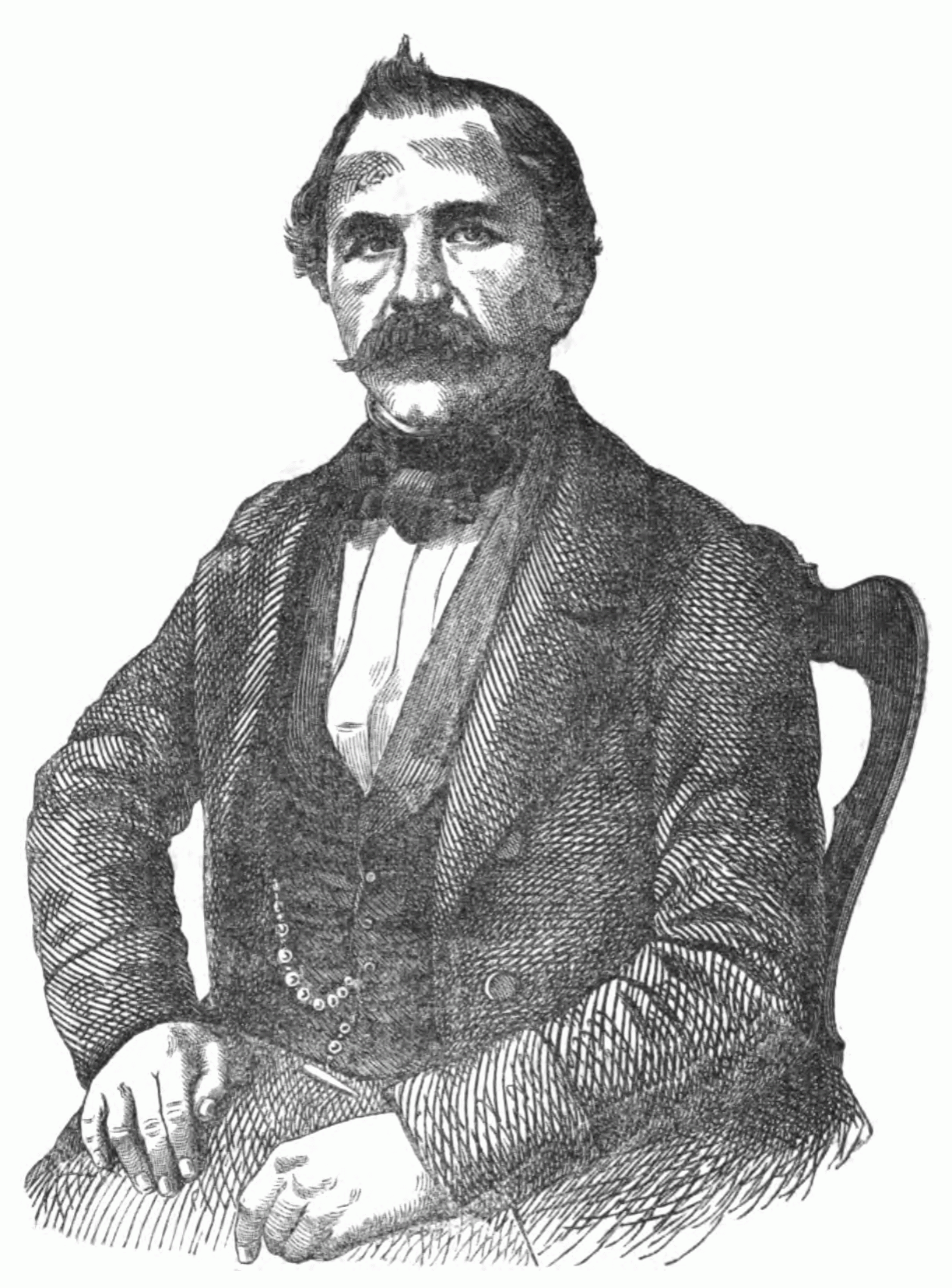
Bogoslav Šulek, a Croatian philologist of Slovak origin.

Slovaks mainly migrated to Croatia in the 19th century, and to a much lesser extent in the 20th century. Many were peasants from the poverty-stricken region of Kysuce in northwestern Slovakia.

Several notable Croatians are of Slovak descent, including philologist cardinal Juraj Haulik, Bogoslav Šulek and writer August Šenoa.

Slovaks are officially recognized as an autochthonous national minority, and as such, together with the Czechs of Croatia, elect a special representative to the Croatian Parliament.

== Geographic representation ==
Most Croatian Slovaks live in the region of Slavonia, with the majority residing in the Osijek-Baranja and the Vukovar-Syrmia counties.

The following were reported as settlements with a significant Slovak minority, as of the 2001 census.

Towns:

- Ilok, 1,044 (12.5%)
- Našice, 964 (5.57%)

Municipalities:

- Punitovci 658 (35.57%)
- Lipovljani, 123 (3%)
- Vrbanja, 72 (1.39%)
- Koška, 50 (1.13%)
- Drenje, 34 (1.1%)

Villages:

- Jelisavac by Našice
- Jurjevac Punitovački by Punitovci
- Markovac
- Soljani

As of 2009, Slovak language is officially used in one municipality and one other settlement in Croatia, according to the European Charter for Regional or Minority Languages.

== Culture ==
The Union of Slovaks was established in 1992 and focused on preserving Slovak culture and language, along with the creation of its magazine, Prameň. In 1998 the Central Library of Slovaks in the Republic of Croatia was founded. In Ilok, the Cultural Society of Ljudevit Štur (KUD Ljudevit Štur).

== Notable people ==
- Ljudevit Gaj (1809–1872), linguist
- Slavoljub Eduard Penkala (1871-1922), engineer and inventor
- August Šenoa (1838-1881), novelist
- Domagoj Vida (born 1989), football player

== See also ==
- Croatia–Slovakia relations
- Croats in Slovakia
- Slovak diaspora
- Ethnic groups in Croatia
- Slovaks in Ilok
- Slovaks in Soljani
