= Predrag Nikolić (director) =

- Born: 14 October 1962 (age 63); Belgrade, PR Serbia, FPR Yugoslavia
- Occupations: Film director, screenwriter
- Years active: 1990–present

Predrag "Peđa" Nikolić (Serbian Cyrillic: Предраг „Пеђа“ Николић, born in Belgrade, October 14, 1962) is a Serbian film and television director, screenwriter and media advisor. He studied filmmaking in Prague and Belgrade.

Besides classic culture TV shows of Radio Television of Serbia (RTS) such as "The Twentieth Century" or "To Love Music", he has directed "Janus' face of history" (1993), an important scientific series written by Zoran Stefanović and Srđan V. Stojančev on the origin of European civilization and the Slavs, which envisioned results of world science in the 21st century; also the most expensive music video in former Yugoslavia "For me you are" for singer Dragana Mirković (computer animation, 1994); as well as award-winning series "The Right to Know" (2003) written by Vladimir B. Popović and others shows and series for RTS, UNICEF and the Government of Serbia.

== Biography ==
He studied at the prestigious Film and TV School of the Academy of Performing Arts in Prague (FAMU) until the beginning of the Yugoslav wars in 1991, then at the Department of Film and Television Directing at the Faculty of Dramatic Arts in Belgrade, where he graduated.

He worked as a director and screenwriter on Radio Television of Serbia from 1990 to 2008, as well as on film and campaigns by various agencies. He directed dozens of shows, series, movies, video clips and commercials.

From 2010 to 2012 he was employed as a media expert at the Ministry of Human and Minority Rights of the Government of the Republic of Serbia.

The "Right to Know" series worked for UNICEF received the main award at "Art amphora" - the Balkan Film and Television Programs for Children and Youth in Bulgaria, and was nominated for the Grand Prix International Festival of the Educational Program Japan Prize.

== Selected works ==
- Janus' face of history (Janusovo lice istorije), scientific series, Radio Television of Serbia (RTS), 1993.
- Journalist workshop (Novinarska radionica), series, RTS in cooperation with IREX, 2001.
- The right to know (Pravo da znam), the youth live action educational series, RTS and UNICEF, 2003.
- Children think of us (Deca misle na nas), live action feature film, RTS, 2004.
- Believe it, but do not overdo it! (Verujte ali ne preterujte!), live action series, RTS, 2007.
- Kraljevo – 11 months of hope (Kraljevo — 11 meseci nade), documentary, Government of Serbia, 2011.
- Thanks to everyone (Hvala svima), publicity documentary, Government of Serbia, 2011.
- Tales of words (Priče o rečima), live action series, RTS, 2012.
- The twentieth century (Dvadeseti vek), scientific series, RTS
- To love music (Voleti muziku), music series, RTS
