= Czech Republic–Serbia relations =

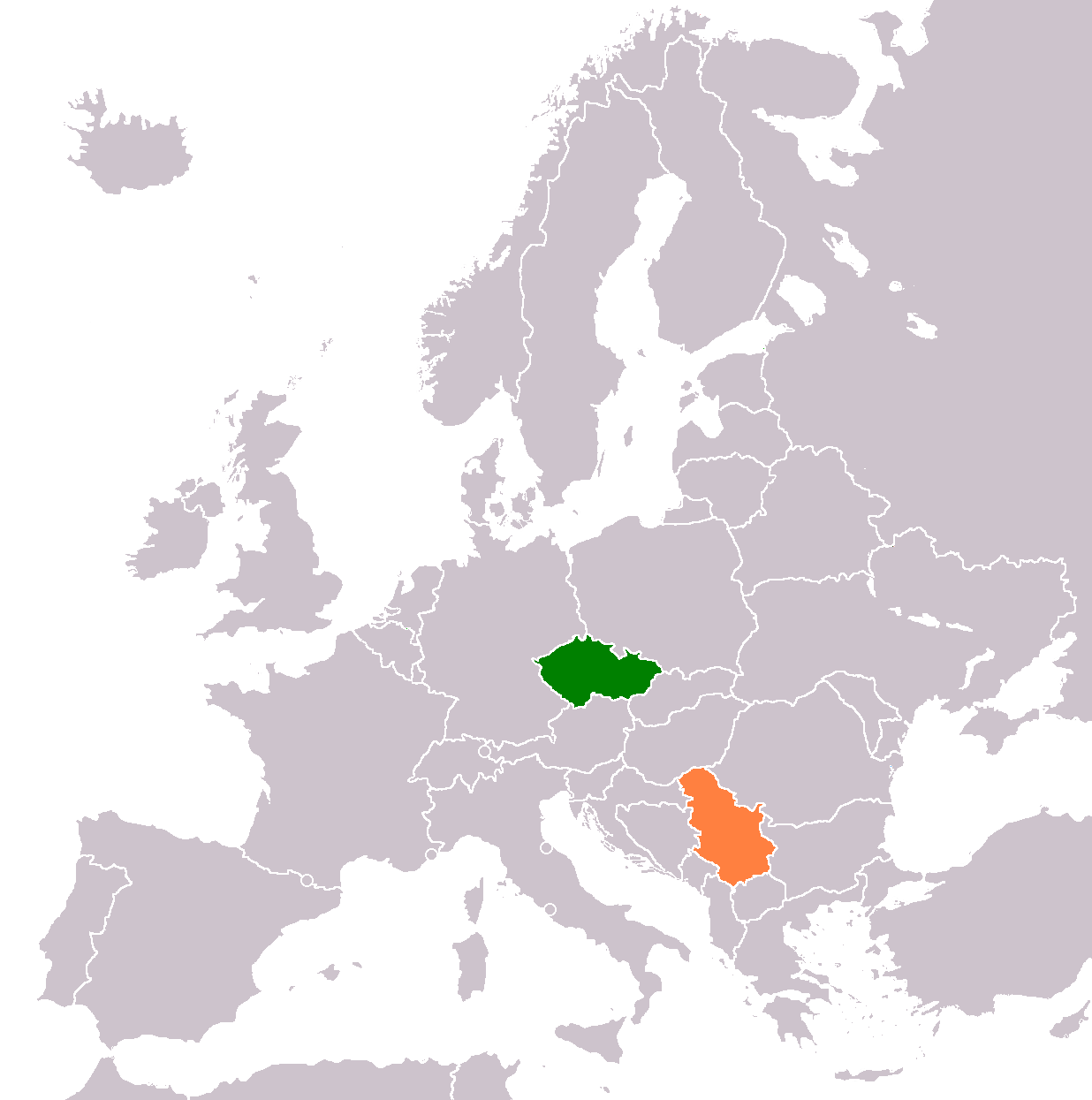
- Czech Republic: Serbia

The Czech Republic and Serbia maintain diplomatic relations established in 1918 between Czechoslovakia and the Kingdom of Serbia. Czechoslovakia maintained relations with the Socialist Federal Republic of Yugoslavia until the dissolution of the latter in 1991. In 1993, newly-formed Czech Republic established relations with Federal Republic of Yugoslavia (later Serbia and Montenegro) of which Serbia is considered sole successor.

== Economic relations ==
Trade between two countries amounted to $2.2 billion in 2023; Serbia's merchandise export to the Czech Republic were about $1.1 billion; Czech exports were standing at over $1 billion.

Czech companies present in Serbia include Škoda Transportation (tramway traction engines plant in Kragujevac) and Mattoni 1873 (owner of carbonated mineral water producer Knjaz Miloš, with plant in Aranđelovac).

== Serbs in the Czech Republic ==
Serbs in the Czech Republic are a recognized as an ethnic minority group. According to data from the 2021 census, 4,101 Serbs live in the Czech Republic, of which 1,187 declared their Serb ethnicity in combination with another ethnicity.

== Czechs in Serbia ==
Czechs in Serbia are recognized as an ethnic minority group. There is a small number of them, 1,317, according to the 2022 Census, mainly living in Vojvodina, particularly in the rural areas of Bela Crkva and Kovin municipalities, in the South Banat District. Češko Selo, a tiny village in the Bela Crkva municipality, is the only settlement with Czech majority in Serbia and the southernmost Czech-majority settlement in Europe.

== Resident diplomatic missions ==
- Czech Republic has an embassy in Belgrade.
- Serbia has an embassy in Prague.
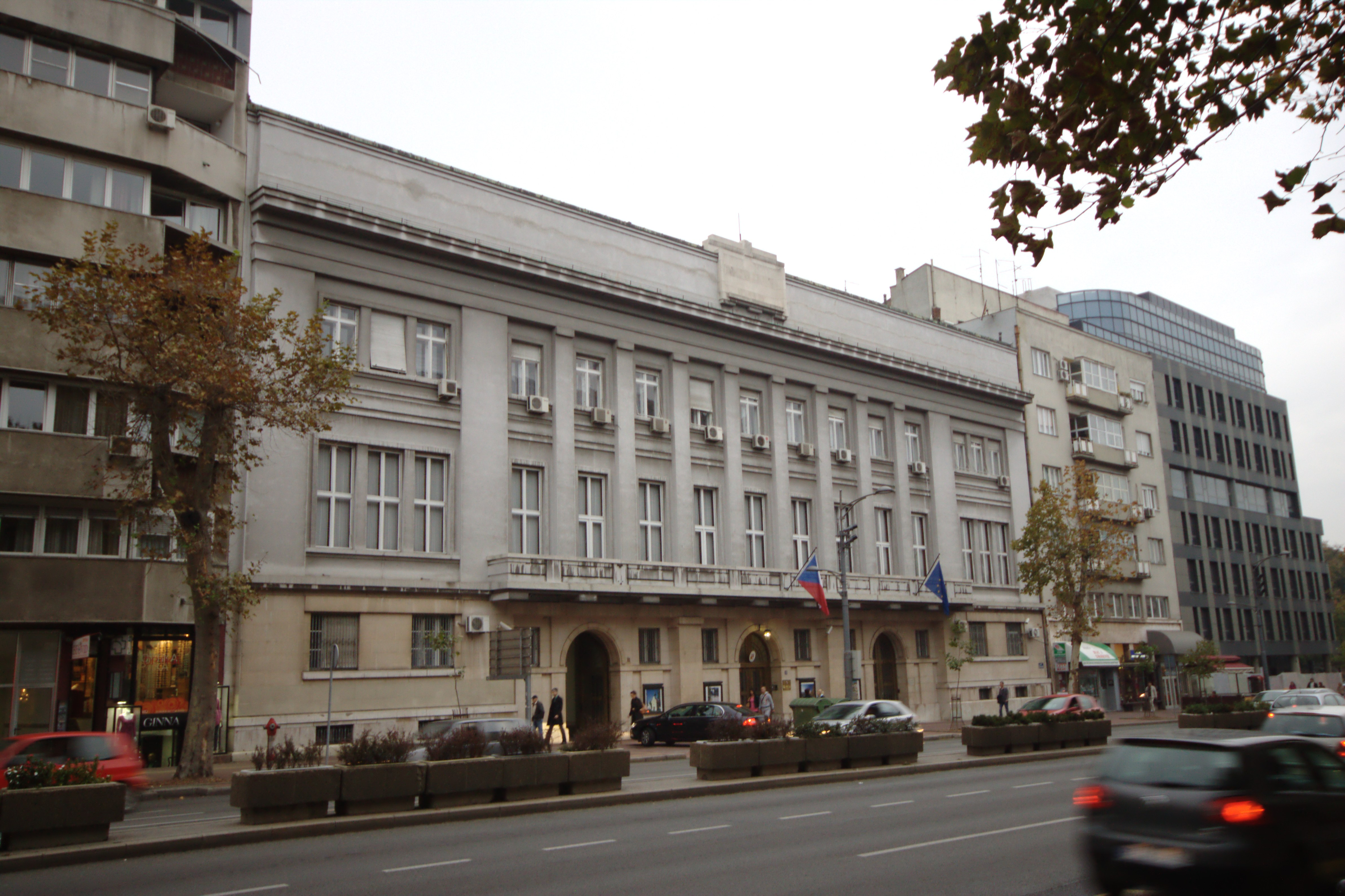
Embassy of the Czech Republic in Belgrade

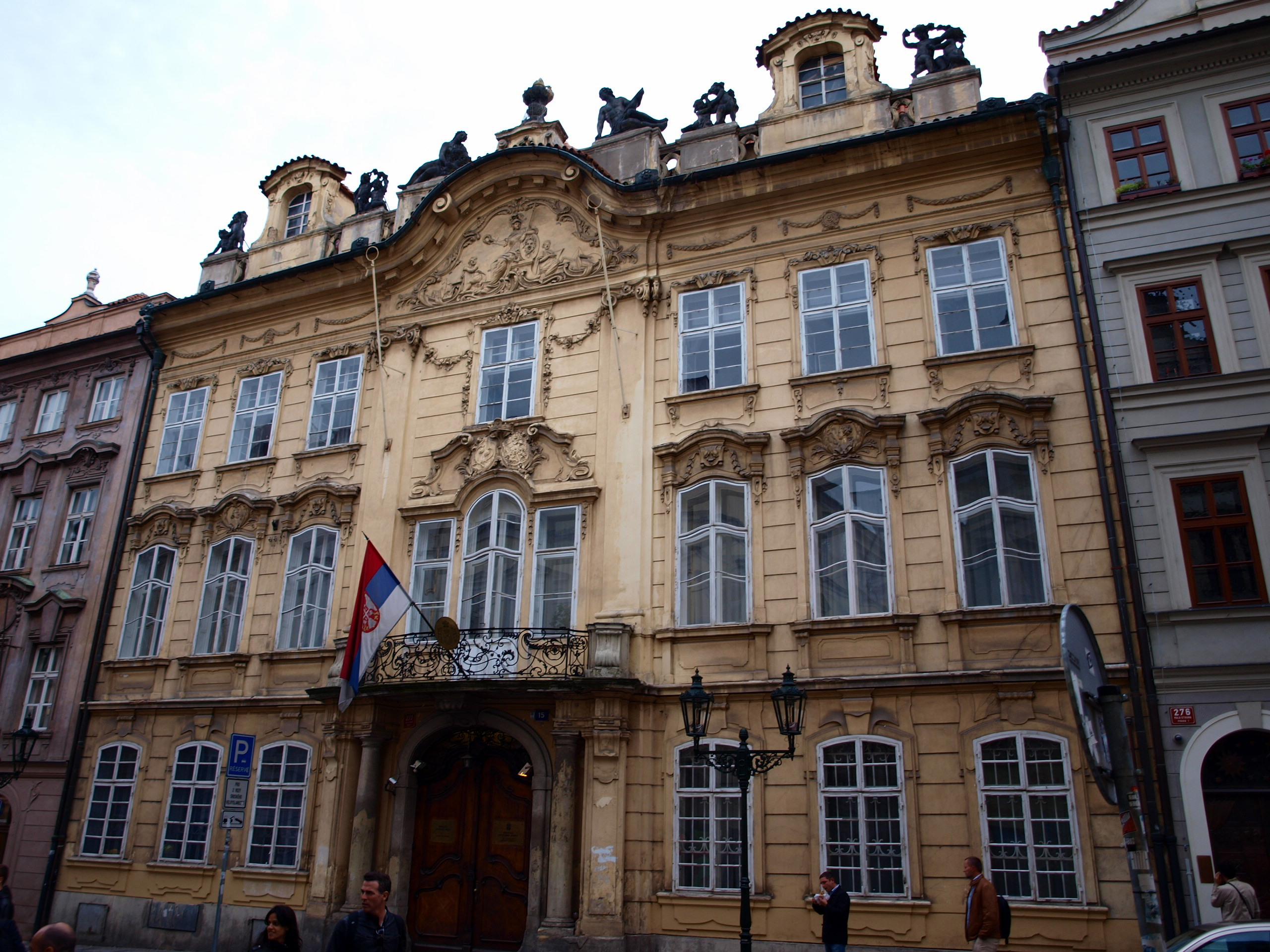
Embassy of Serbia in Prague

== See also ==
- Foreign relations of Czech Republic
- Foreign relations of Serbia
- Serbia-NATO relations
- Accession of Serbia to the EU
- Czechoslovakia–Yugoslavia relations
