= Austro-Slavism =

Political concept and program

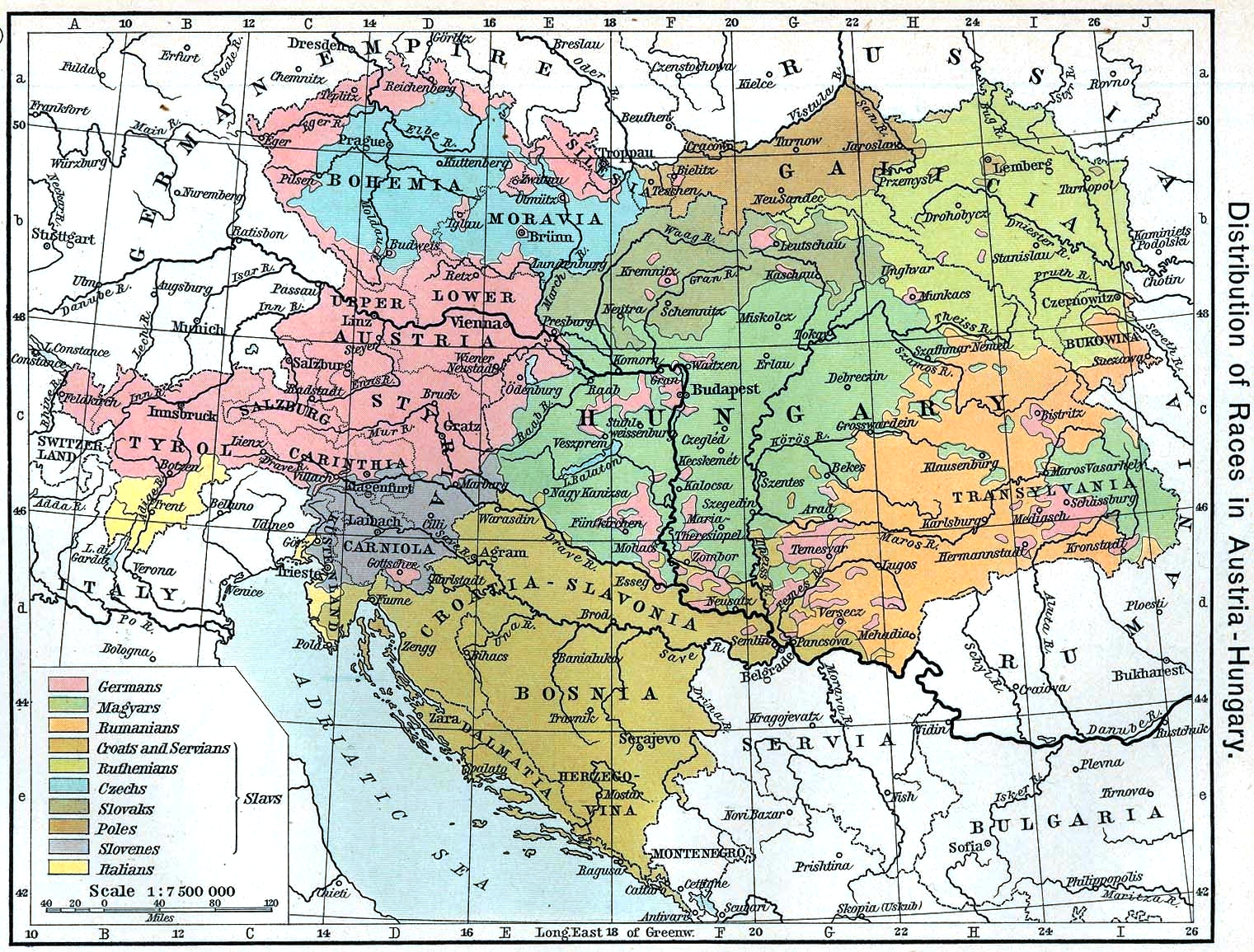
"Distribution of Races in Austria-Hungary", showing the areas inhabited by Slavic peoples (in the Historical Atlas by William R. Shepherd, 1911)

Austro-Slavism or Austrian Slavism (Note: Czech: Austroslavismus, German: Austroslawismus, Croatian: Austroslavizam, Slovak: Austroslavizmus, Slovene: Avstroslavizem, Serbian: Аустрославизам, romanized: Austroslavizam, Ukrainian: Австрославізм, romanized: Avstroslavizm.) was a political concept and program aimed to solve problems of Slavic peoples in the Austrian Empire. It was most influential among Czech liberals around the middle of the 19th century. First proposed by Karel Havlíček Borovský in 1846, as an opposition to the concept of pan-Slavism, it was further developed into a complete political program by Czech politician František Palacký. Austroslavism also found some support in other Slavic nations in the Austrian Empire, especially the Poles, Slovenes, Croats and Slovaks.

== Program ==
Austro-Slavism envisioned peaceful cooperation between the smaller Slavic nations of Central Europe within the Habsburg monarchy not dominated by German-speaking elites. Palacký proposed a federation of eight national regions, with significant self-governance. After the suppression of the Czech revolution in Prague in June 1848, the program became irrelevant. The Austrian Empire transformed into Austria-Hungary (1867), honouring Hungarian, but not Slavic demands as part of the Ausgleich. This further weakened the position of Austro-Slavism, as did the dawn of the coercive policy of Magyarization during the 1880s.

As a political concept, however, Austro-Slavism persisted until the fall of the Austrian-Hungarian Empire in 1918. Archduke Franz Ferdinand of Austria, who was heir presumptive to Emperor Franz Joseph, was a true believer in Austro-Slavism, which he felt was a necessary and long overdue reform if the Empire was to survive.

The 1918 collapse of Austria-Hungary owed a great deal to Emperor Charles' failure to implement Austro-Slavist reforms due to both foreign and domestic politicians and to the ongoing chaos of the First World War. Meanwhile, Tomáš Garrigue Masaryk, who was later to become the first President of Czechoslovakia, had successfully convinced U.S. President Woodrow Wilson during the First World War that the Slavic peoples of Austria-Hungary were oppressed and needed to be liberated. This, in turn, led directly to President Wilson's rejection of the efforts of Emperor Charles I of Austria to return the Empire to federalism (such as the abortive United States of Greater Austria plan). President Wilson's refusal to accept an end to the war on any other terms led directly to the collapse of the Empire in 1918.

Parts of Austria-Hungary with ethnic Slavic majorities in dark green

== Prominent supporters ==
- Archduke Franz Ferdinand of Austria
- Charles I of Austria
- Josip Jelačić
- Janez Bleiweis
- Karel Havlíček Borovský
- Jernej Kopitar
- Anton Tomaž Linhart
- Franz Miklosich
- František Palacký
- Paweł Stalmach
- Josip Juraj Strossmayer

== See also ==
- Austromarxism and national personal autonomy
- Czechoslovakia–Yugoslavia relations
- Euro-Slavism
- Neo-Slavism
- Pan-Slavism
- Olomouc University in the year of revolutions
- Trialism in Austria-Hungary
