= Jindřichovice (Sokolov District) =

- Municipality
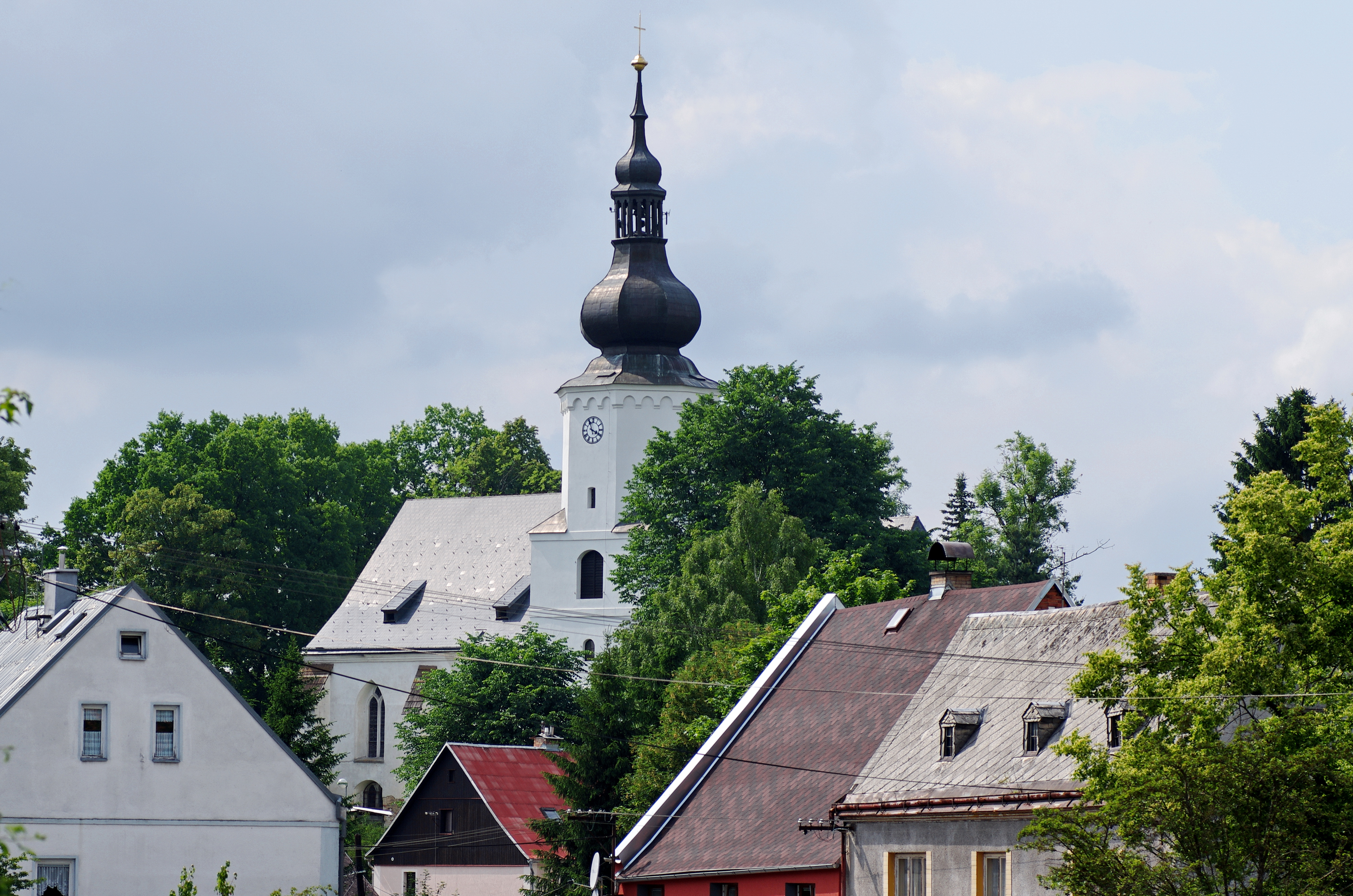
- Church of Saint Martin

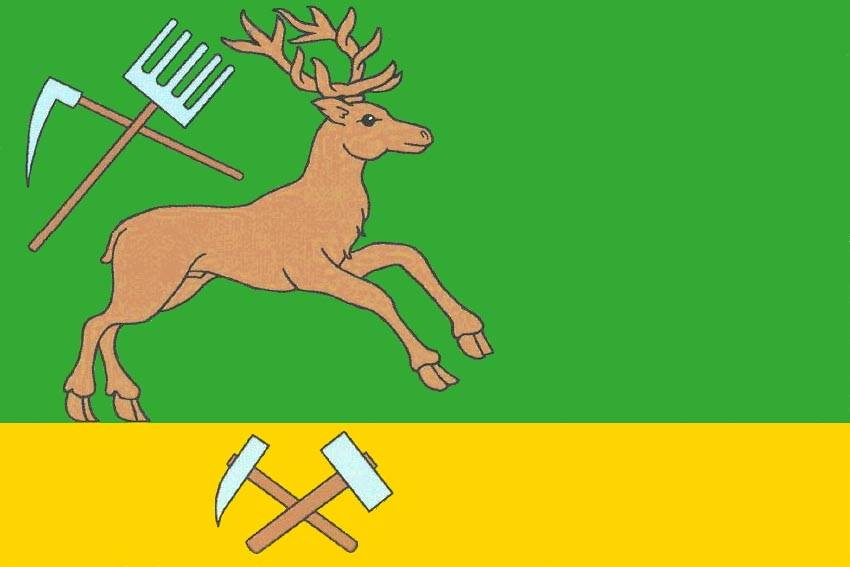
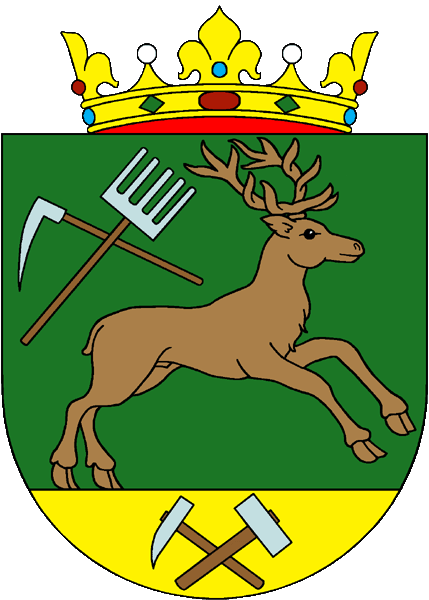
- Flag Coat of arms

- Location in the Czech Republic
- Coordinates: 50°16′58″N 12°36′9″E
- Country: Czech Republic
- Region: Karlovy Vary
- District: Sokolov
- First mentioned: 1273

Area
  - Total: 44.38 km^{2} (17.14 sq mi)
- Elevation: 646 m (2,119 ft)

Population (2026-01-01)
  - Total: 543
  - Density: 12.2/km^{2} (31.7/sq mi)
- Time zone: UTC+1 (CET)
  - Summer (DST): UTC+2 (CEST)
- Postal codes: 356 01, 358 01
- Website: www.obecjindrichovice.cz

Jindřichovice (German: Heinrichsgrün) is a municipality and village in Sokolov District in the Karlovy Vary Region of the Czech Republic. It has about 500 inhabitants.

== Administrative division ==
Jindřichovice consists of two municipal parts (in brackets population according to the 2021 census):

- Jindřichovice (453)
- Háj (41)

== Etymology ==
The initial German name of Jindřichovice was Heinrichsgrün and was derived from the personal name Heinrich. The Czech name Jindřichovice was derived from the name Jindřich, which is a Czech form of Heinrich.

== Geography ==
Jindřichovice is located about 12 kilometres (7 mi) north of Sokolov and 19 km (12 mi) northwest of Karlovy Vary. It lies in the Ore Mountains. The highest point is the mountain Vysoká jedle at 736 m (2,415 ft) above sea level. The Svatava River briefly flows along the western municipal border. Several brooks flow through the municipality.

== History ==
The first written mention of Jindřichovice is in a deed of Pope Gregory X from 1273. In the 14th century, tin was mined here. From 1434 to the 17th century, the village was owned by the Schlick family. They improved the village and expanded metal mining to include silver, lead and iron. Jindřichovice was promoted to a town in 1537 by Emperor Ferdinand I, but it ceased to be a town after World War II. In the 17th century, Jindřichovice was bought by the Nostitz family, who owned it until 1945.

In 1938, Jindřichovice was annexed by Nazi Germany following Munich Agreement and administered as part of the Reichsgau Sudetenland. The German-speaking population was expelled in 1945 according the Beneš decrees and partially replaced by Czechs.

== Demographics ==
Historical population

Year	Pop.	±%
1869	3,597	—
1880	3,679	+2.3%
1890	3,570	−3.0%
1900	3,649	+2.2%
1910	3,696	+1.3%

Year	Pop.	±%
1921	3,380	−8.5%
1930	3,400	+0.6%
1950	892	−73.8%
1961	779	−12.7%
1970	551	−29.3%

Year	Pop.	±%
1980	394	−28.5%
1991	318	−19.3%
2001	386	+21.4%
2011	472	+22.3%
2021	494	+4.7%

Source: Censuses

== Transport ==
There are no railways or major roads passing through the municipality.

== Sights ==
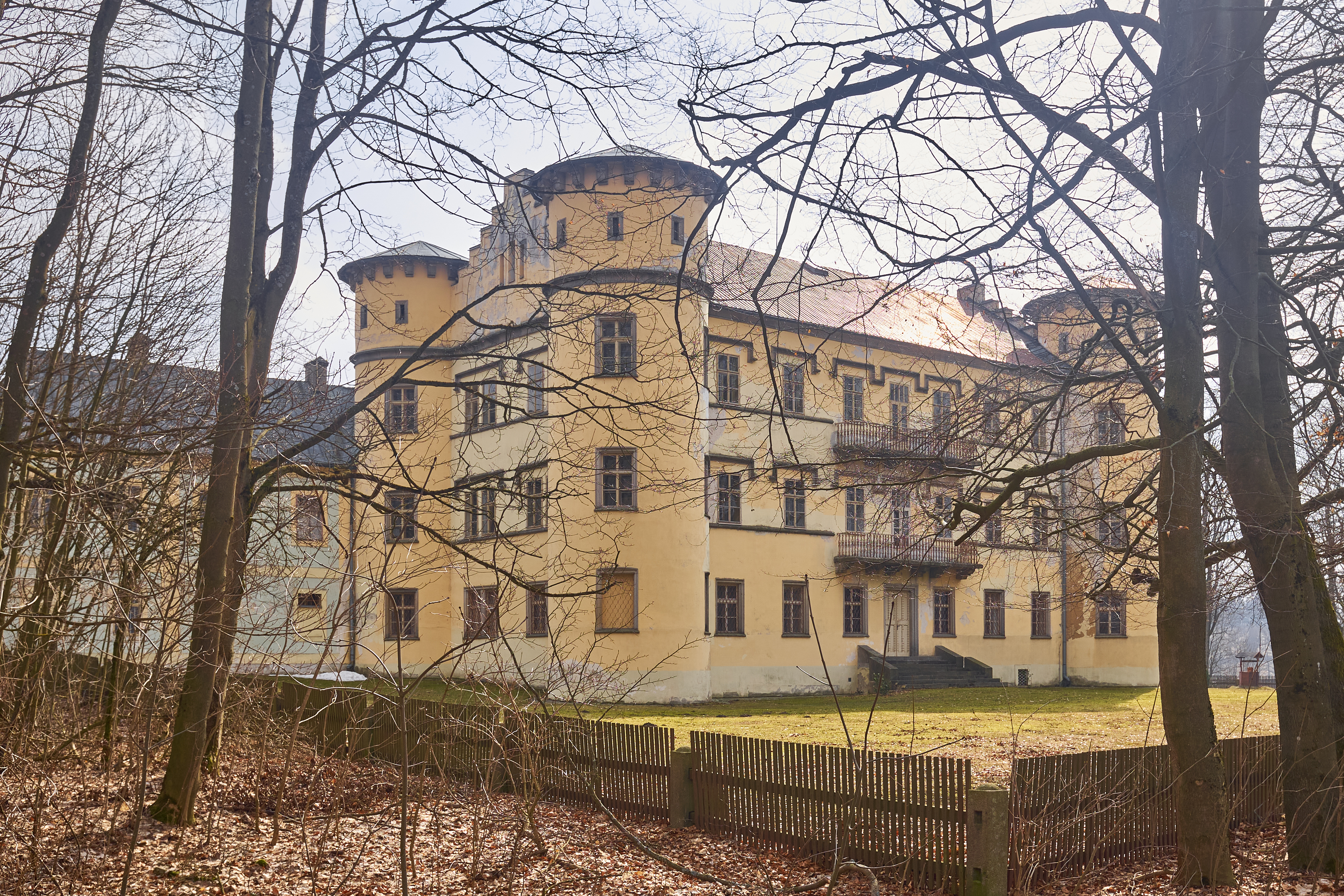
Jindřichovice Castle

The main landmark Jindřichovice is the Church of Saint Martin. The original Gothic church was built in the 14th century. The current Baroque structure dates from the second half of the 17th century and was modified into its current form in the 19th century, but it has a Gothic core from the original church.

The Jindřichovice Castle was built in 1672 for Jan Hartvík Nostitz. This early Baroque castle was rebuilt in the neo-Gothic style in the second half of the 19th century. Today it serves as the seat of the district archive.
