= Mausoleum of Yugoslav Soldiers in Olomouc =

Ossuary in the Czech Republic

Coordinates: 49.594681°N 17.256686°E

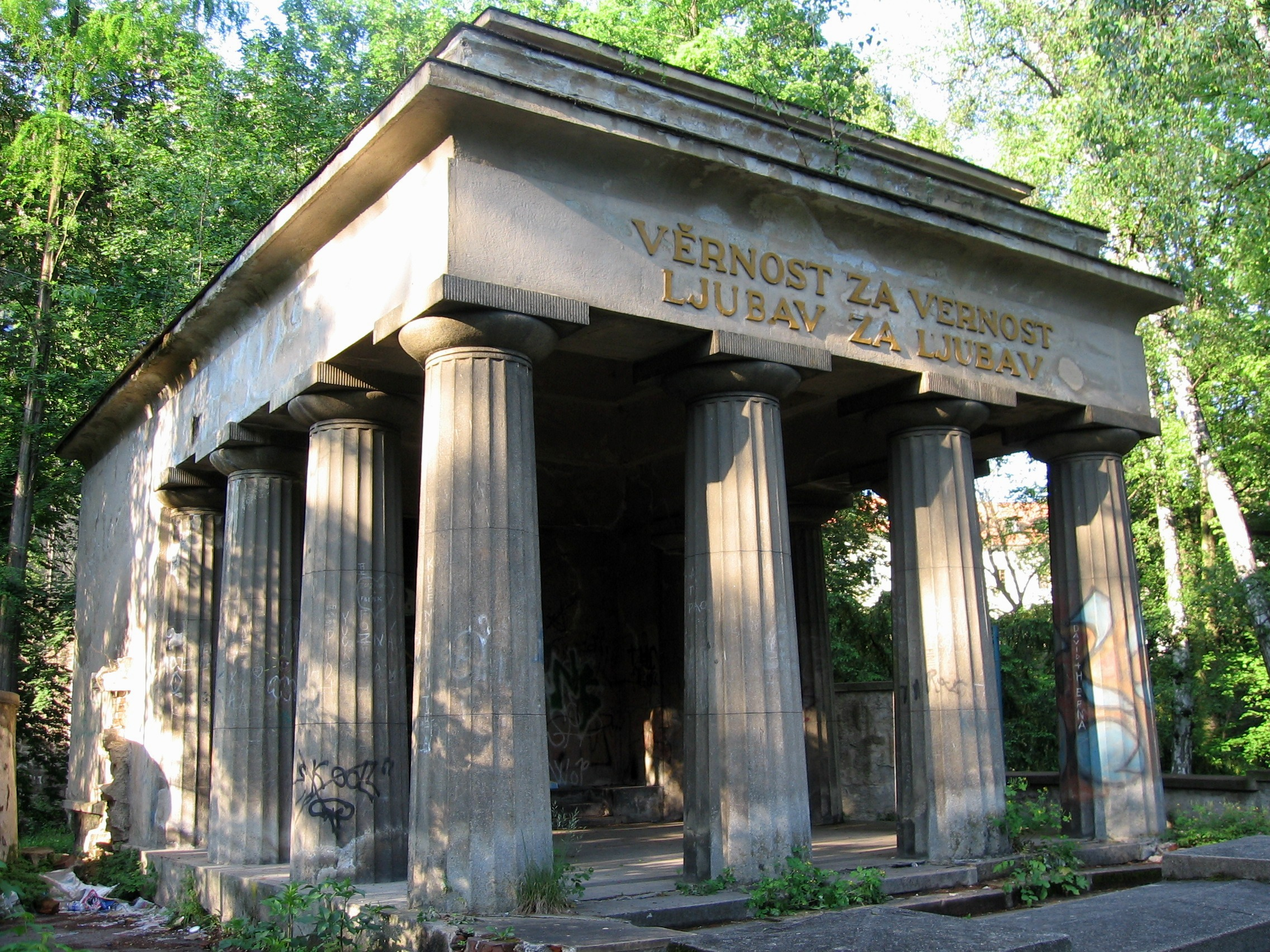
Mausoleum of Yugoslav Soldiers in Olomouc

The Mausoleum of Yugoslav Soldiers (Czech: Mauzoleum jugoslávských vojínů or also Jihoslovanské mauzoleum) is a neoclassical chapel with an ossuary containing remains of soldiers from what later became Yugoslavia killed in the First World War. It was built in 1926 in Bezruč Park in Olomouc, Czechoslovakia (now the Czech Republic) by the Czechoslovak-Yugoslav League. The designer of the chapel was architect Hubert Aust. The mausoleum was owned by Yugoslavia until its breakup. It was in bad shape for long time. Its renovation was prevented because of unclear property rights. The chapel was reconstructed in 2016–2020. The mausoleum is now owned by the city of Olomouc. (A Czech court took it away from Yugoslavia. The reason was that the Kingdom of Yugoslavia had ceased to exist, and none of the former Yugoslav countries wanted to look after it.) Another, larger Mausoleum of Yugoslav Soldiers in the Czech Republic is in Jindřichovice (near Karlovy Vary). There are 7,378 bodies interred there.

== Description ==
The chapel is 11 metres high, topped with a dome. A two-branch staircase leads to the chapel entrance behind 12 Doric columns standing in three rows. An epigraph on the chapel reads: VĚRNOST ZA VĚRNOST – LJUBAV ZA LJUBAV. (The first part is in Czech and means 'loyalty for loyalty', the second part is in Serbo-Croatian and means 'love for love'.) The building stands on an artificial mound, inside which is the ossuary. The entrance to the ossuary is a portal with a sandstone relief of a mourning woman and national emblems of Yugoslavia and Czechoslovakia. It contains the remains of more than 1,100 Yugoslav soldiers who died in Olomouc military hospitals.

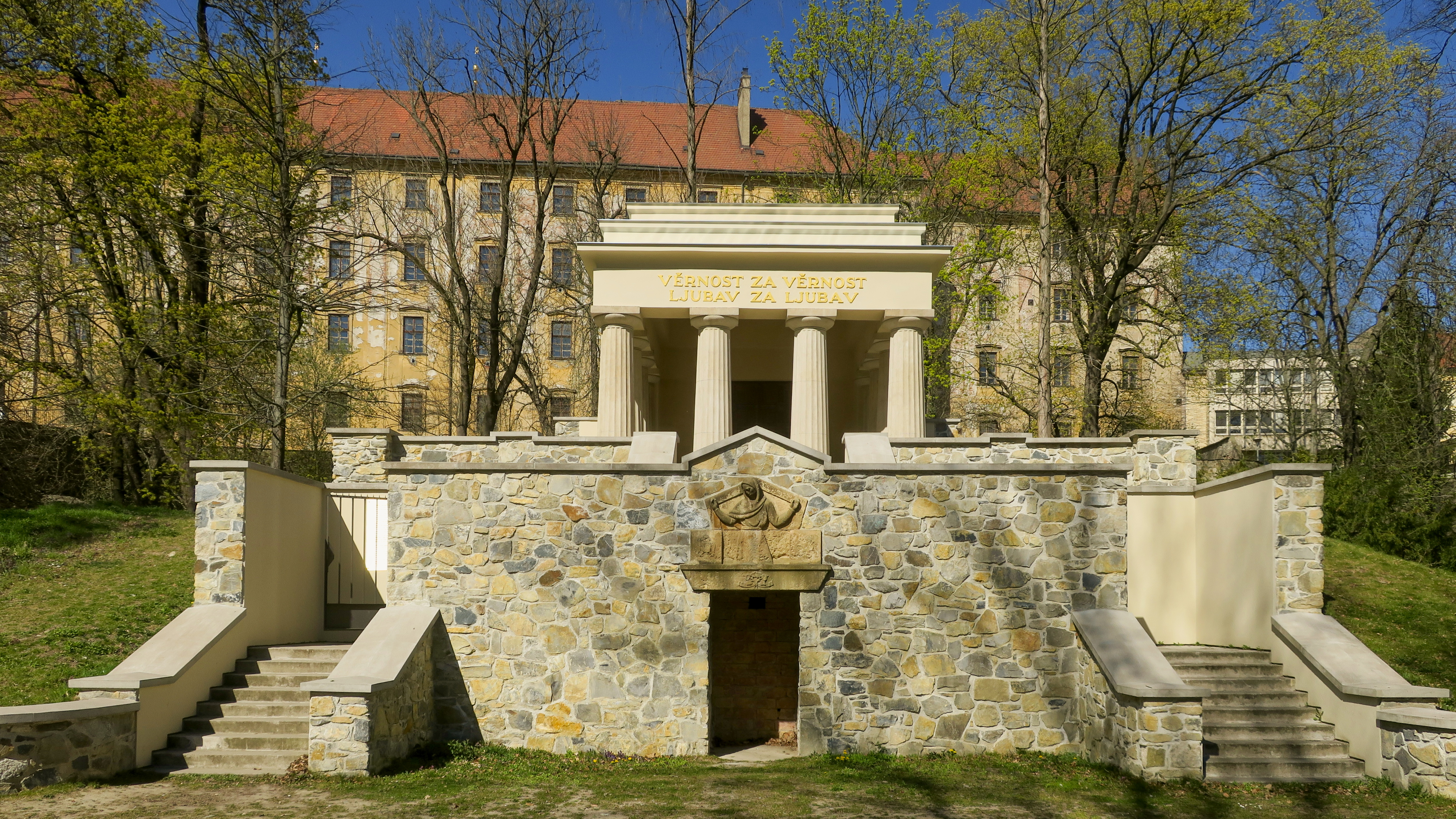
Mausoleum

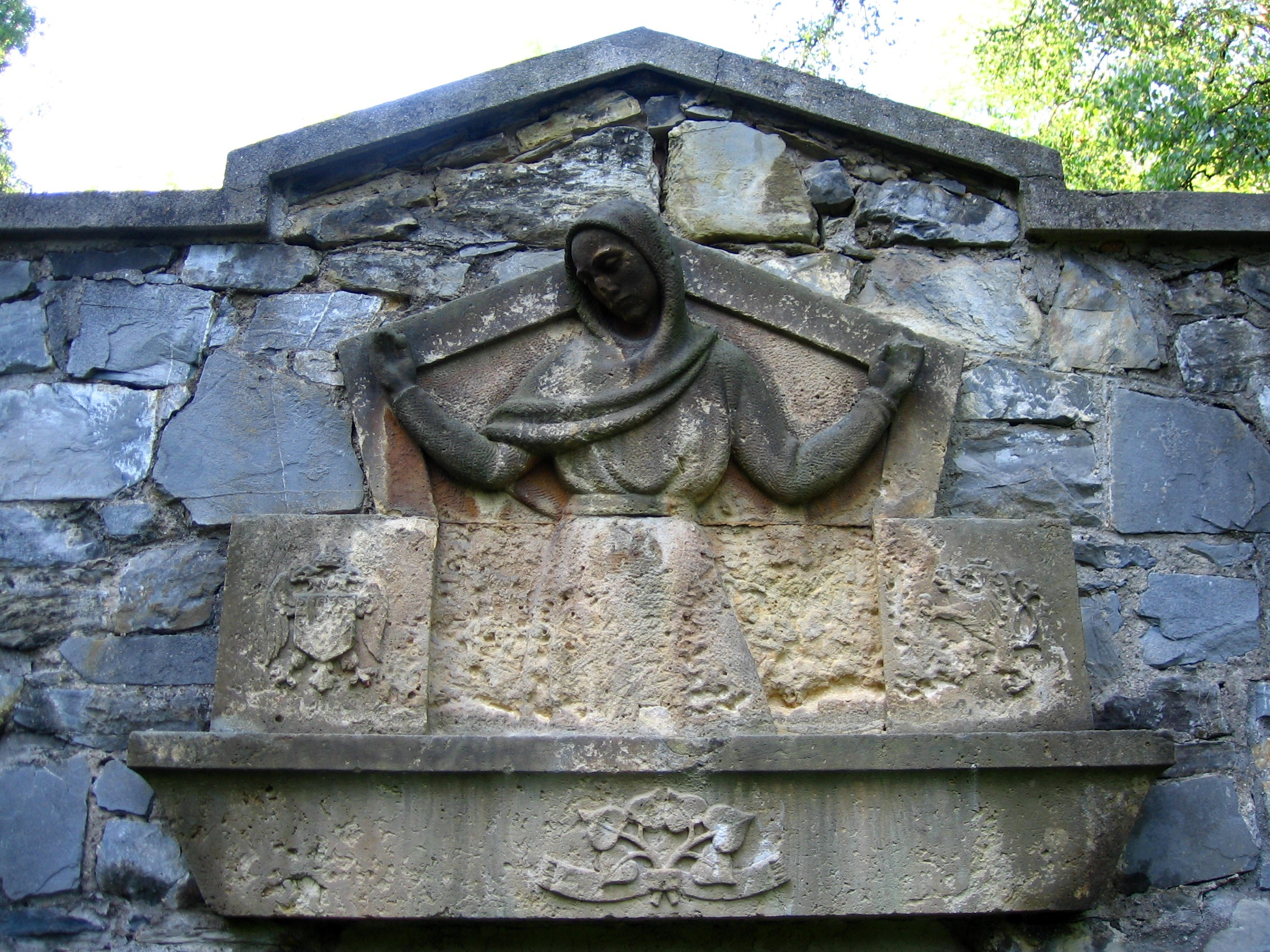
Damaged sandstone relief above the portal to the ossuary

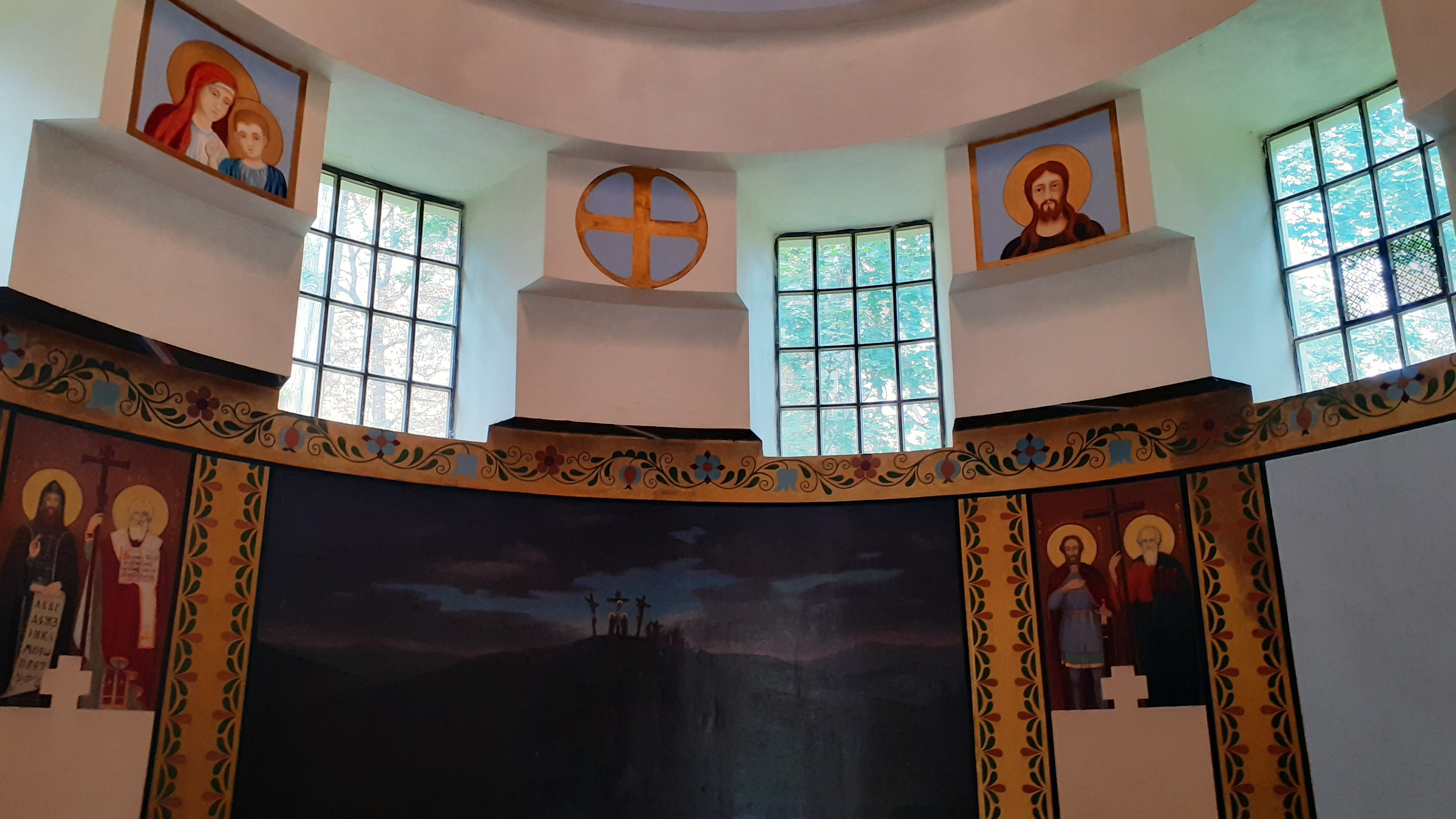
Interior of the chapel with frescoes

== Body remains ==
Body remains (bones) are stored in quite small coffins (boxes). The reason is that at the time the mausoleum was built (1928) the body remains were already buried in various cemeteries across Moravia and Silesia. The body remains of individual soldiers (but not their original coffins) were taken from their original burial place and moved to the mausoleum (and put in a small box).

37 of them were Serbian prisoners of war. (During the war, Moravia was part of Austria-Hungary, which fought against Serbia.) The rest of the bodies were those of Austrian-Hungarian soldiers who were ethnically Serbs, Slovenes or Croats. (Slovenia, Bosnia and Croatia were part of Austria-Hungary, and later became part of the Kingdom of Serbs, Croats and Slovenes, which subsequently became Yugoslavia.)

A few of the body remains are of ethnic Czechs (Croatian Czechs).

== Condition and plans of renovation ==
The mausoleum is in a bad condition due to both natural effects and vandalism, and therefore it is not open to the public. The stairs and electrical wiring are in the greatest disrepair. Frescoes of saints painted in the Byzantine style are also partly damaged.

The entrance to the ossuary used to be closed with a grille and a wooden door, but these were destroyed by vandals who also destroyed several wooden coffins and stole some skulls and other bones. As a result, the portal was walled up in 1990. Thanks to this, the ossuary was saved from the flood which struck Olomouc in 1997. The entrance was reopened in 1998 to assess the range of necessary repairs and to stop the spread of mould, and was then walled up again.

The first attempt at renovation was begun with negotiations with its official owner, the Socialist Federal Republic of Yugoslavia, at the beginning of the 1990s, but in 1992 Yugoslavia disintegrated and the negotiations stopped.

In 2006 an agreement was made with the embassy of Slovenia as one of the successor states. It was expected that repairs would cost 12.5 million Czech crowns, with the money coming from the city of Olomouc, European Structural Funds and the Czech Ministry of Culture. However, the project was suspended by the end of the year because the problems with property rights made the request for the European funding impossible.
