= Komárno =

Town in Slovakia

Komárno Komárom
- Municipality
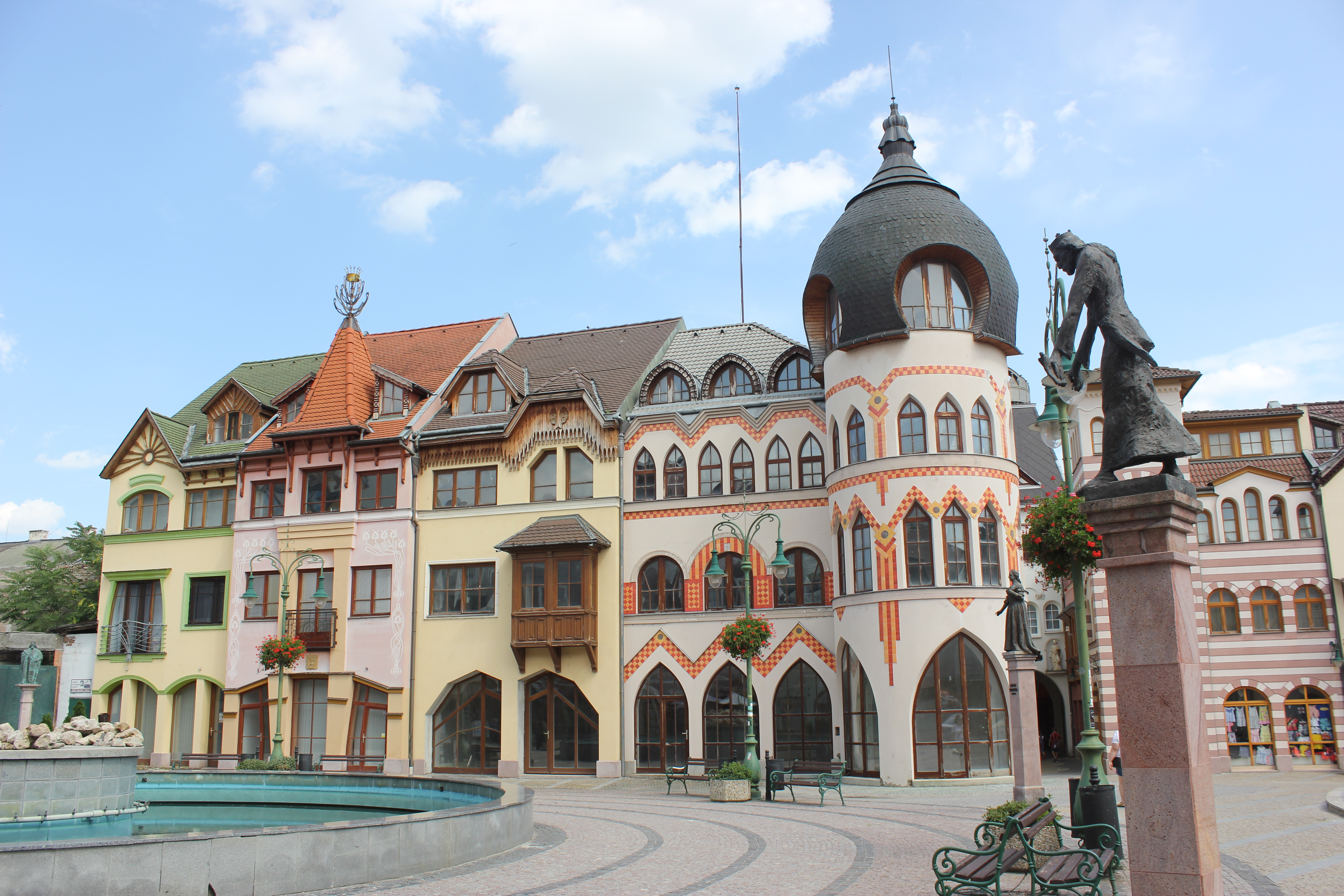
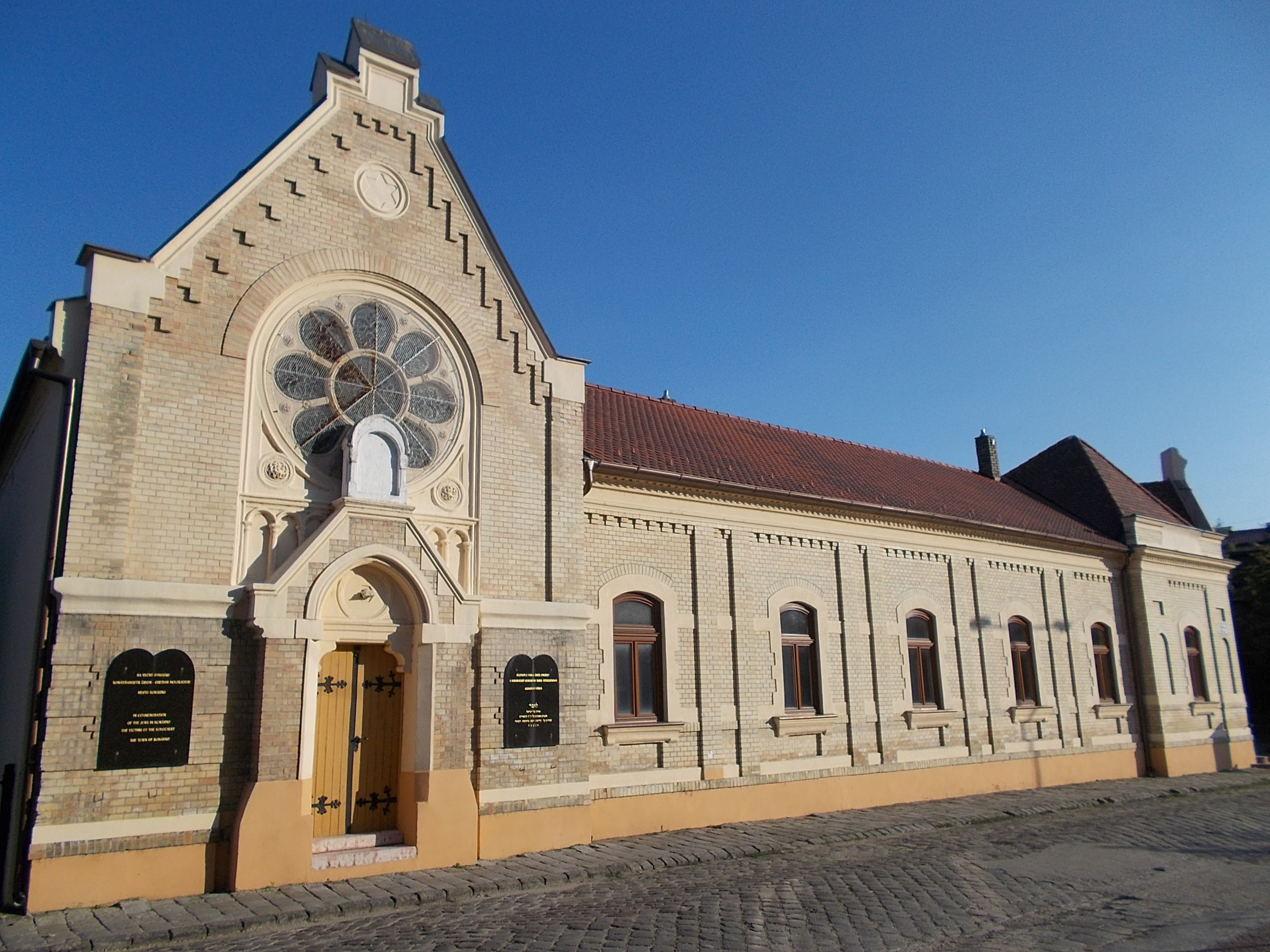
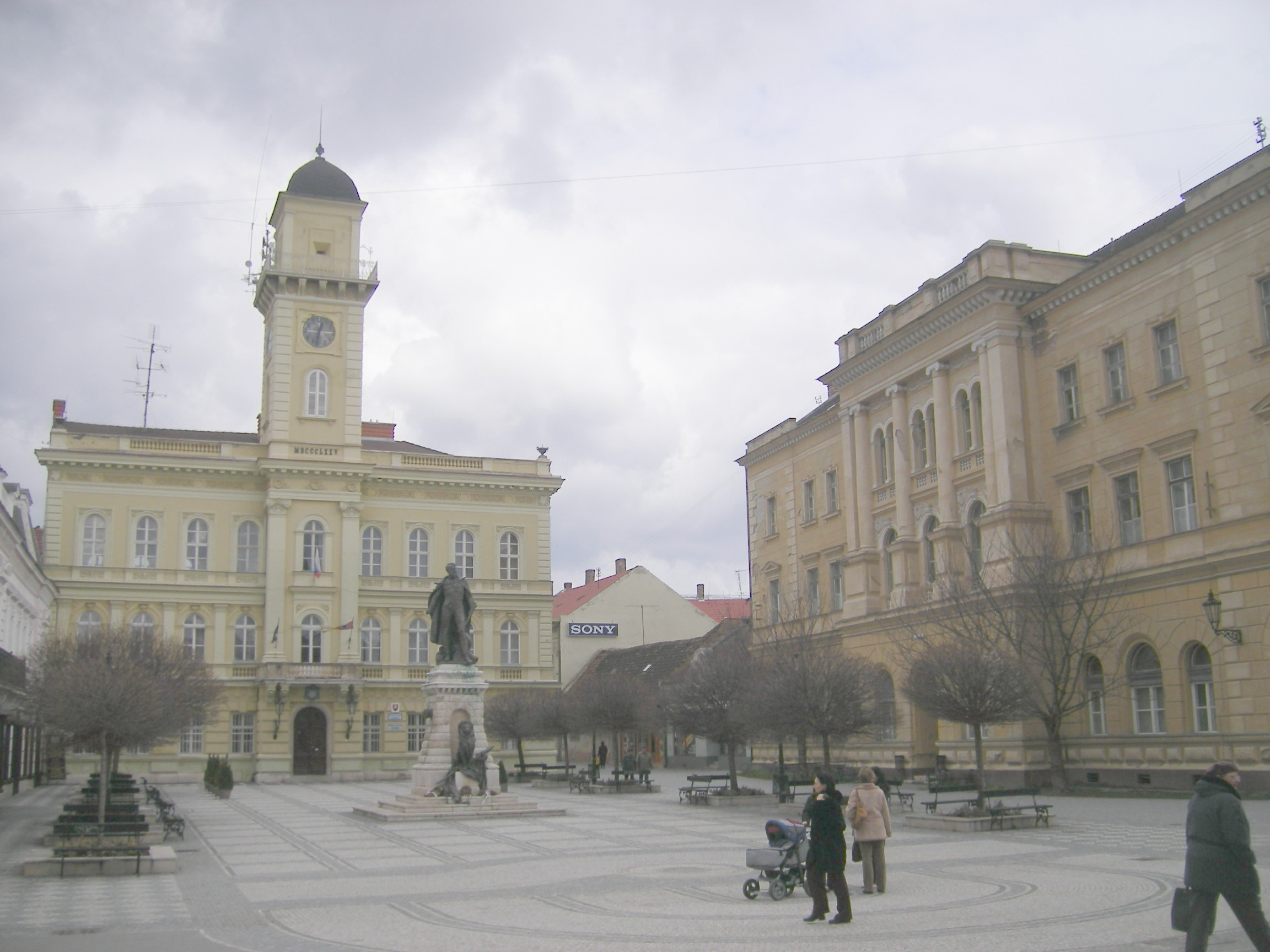
- From the top, Courtyard of Europe, Cultural and Social Centre of the Jewish Community of Komarno, Komárno Town Hall

- Flag Coat of arms

- Location of Komárno in the Nitra Region Location of Komárno in Slovakia
- Coordinates: 47.76°N 18.13°E
- Country: Slovakia
- Region: Nitra Region
- District: Komárno District
- First mentioned: 1075

Government
  - Mayor: Béla Keszegh (Ind.)

Area
  - Total: 102.80 km^{2} (39.69 sq mi)
- Elevation: 109 m (358 ft)

Population (2025)
  - Total: 31,560
- Time zone: UTC+1 (CET)
  - Summer (DST): UTC+2 (CEST)
- Postal code: 945 01
- Area code: +421 35
- Vehicle registration plate (until 2022): KN
- Website: www.komarno.sk

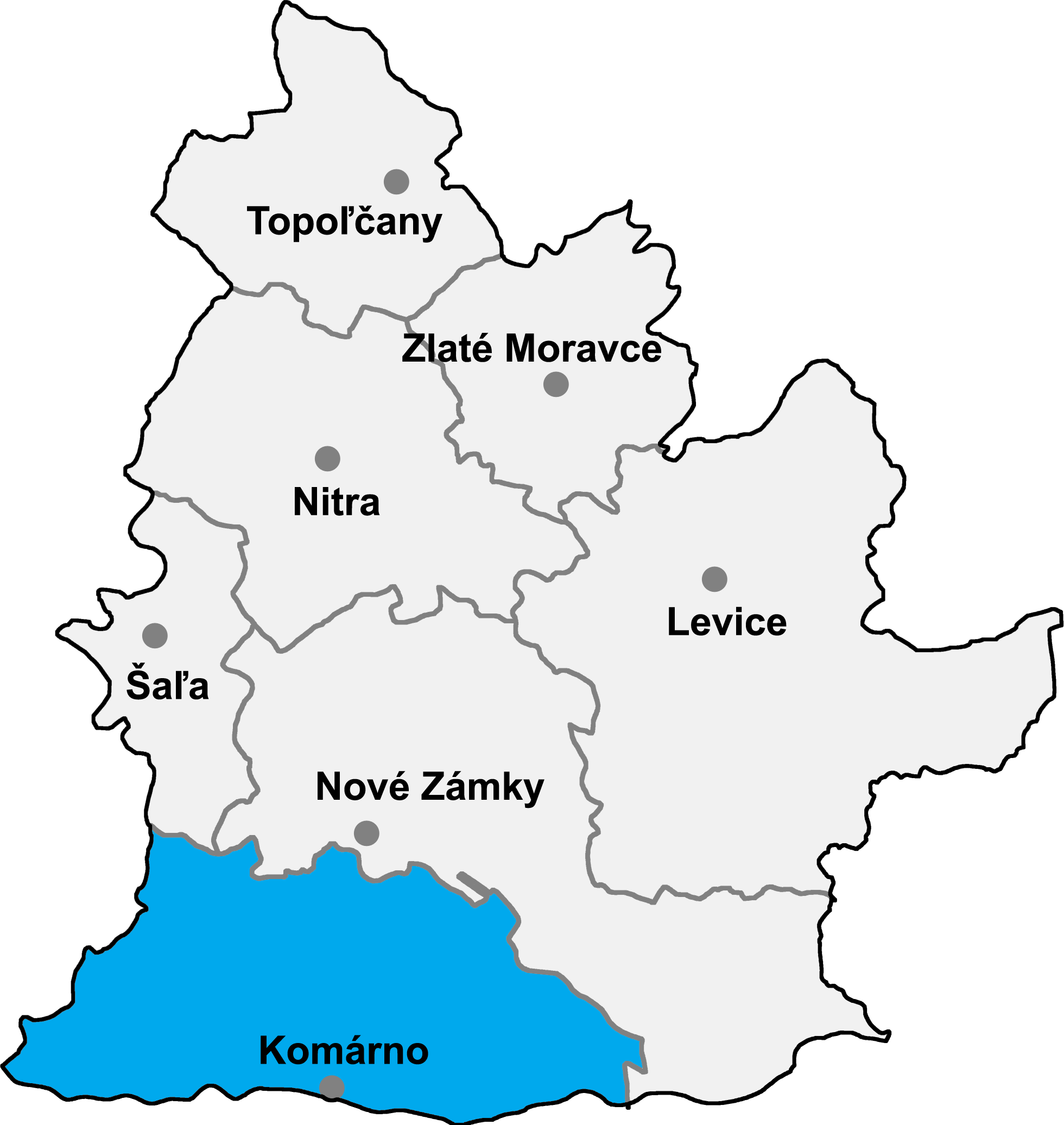
Komarno district map

Komárno (Hungarian: Komárom, German: Komorn, Serbian: Коморан/Komoran), colloquially also called Révkomárom, Öregkomárom, Észak-Komárom in Hungarian, is a town in Slovakia at the confluence of the Danube and the Váh rivers. Historically, it was formed by the "old town" on the left bank of the Danube, present-day Komárno in Slovakia, and by a "new town" on the right bank, present-day Komárom in Hungary, which were historically one administrative unit. Following World War I and the Treaty of Trianon, the border of the newly created Czechoslovakia cut the historical, unified town in half, creating two new independent towns in two countries. Komárno and Komárom are connected by the Elisabeth Bridge, which used to be an official border crossing between Slovakia and Hungary until border checks were lifted due to the Schengen Area rules. In 2020, a new road bridge was opened.

Komárno is Slovakia's principal port on the Danube. It is also the center of the Hungarian community in Slovakia, which makes up 56.69% (2021 census) of the town's population. The town is the historic seat of the Serbian national minority in Slovakia.

== Geography ==
The municipality lies at an altitude of 109 metres (358 ft) and covers an area of 102.80 km^{2} (39.69 sq mi) (2025).

== Names and etymology ==
The name is of Slavic or Latin origin. The first interpretation is straightforward – the name consists of two parts: komár (Slavic/Slovak: a mosquito) and an ending -no (a place name). Thus, Komárom means "a place with many mosquitos", reflecting a location in a swampy area near the Danube. According to another theory, the name could be derived from Latin commercium (a trade center).

One disputed record of the name of the settlement can be dated back to 1075 as Camarum. Further documents mention the settlement as Kamarn(iensis) / Komarn(iense) (1218), Kamarum (1266), Camarum (1268), Kamar (1283), and many others, e.g., Camaron, Comaron (between 1372 and 1498). Villa Camarun was one of the 23 settlements belonging to the domain of the Komárom castle.

The Hungarian name for the town is historically Komárom. Since the town has been split, the more colloquial names Révkomárom (Komárom Port), Öregkomárom (Old Komárom), and Észak-Komárom (North Komárom) are used to distinguish it from the town on the Hungarian side, which is simply called Komárom.

== History ==
Komárno, located at the confluence of the Danube (rom. Ister) and Váh rivers, 108 – 115 meters above sea level, is an old settlement. Findings stem from the Neolithic, Eneolithic period, the Bronze Age. Many archaeological remains found throughout the region surrounding Komárom indicate the area was settled by the Celts toward the end of the 1st Century BC.

During the 1st century AD, the Roman Empire extended its frontiers over the region, forming the province of Pannonia (present day Transdanubia). Here, the Romans, on the southern shore of the Danube, established the military camp and the settlement Brigetio. A chain of fortifications built along the Danube shores protected the camp and town. On the northern shore of the Danube, the fortified bridgehead of Celemantia (near present-day Iža) was built at the beginning of the 2nd century. Some historians suppose that there was a similar Roman fortress on the site of the Komárno (Brigetio) Castle because of the strategic importance of the place, but excavations have not yet proved this theory. The Romans remained in Pannonia until the end of the 4th century, when they were gradually pushed out by the strengthening attacks of barbarian tribes.

Gothic, Slavic, and Avar findings have been excavated here from the 7th and 8th centuries AD. After the collapse of the Avar empire at the end of the 8th century, Komárno had remained one of the last resorts of the Avars. The most significant Avar findings are the so-called Shipyard-graves. They are one of the most significant Avar findings in the Carpathian Basin with 153 graves dated from the 7th to 9th century.

In the early 10th century, the territory came under the rule of the Magyar tribes. According to the medieval chronicle Gesta Hungarorum, one of the Magyar tribal chieftains, Ketel, established his domain near the mouth of the Váh river, his son Alaptolma later built a castle there and named it Komárom. Two-thirds of their people settled around the castle. Both Ketel and Alaptolma were buried in Komárom according to the pagan fashion. Soon after, during the time of the formation of the Hungarian State in the age of Stephen I, the fortified settlement with its castle became the center of the Komárom county. The factual accuracy of the Gesta Hungarorum is often disputed, and according to excavations, the present-day Komárom Castle was built only in the 12th century.

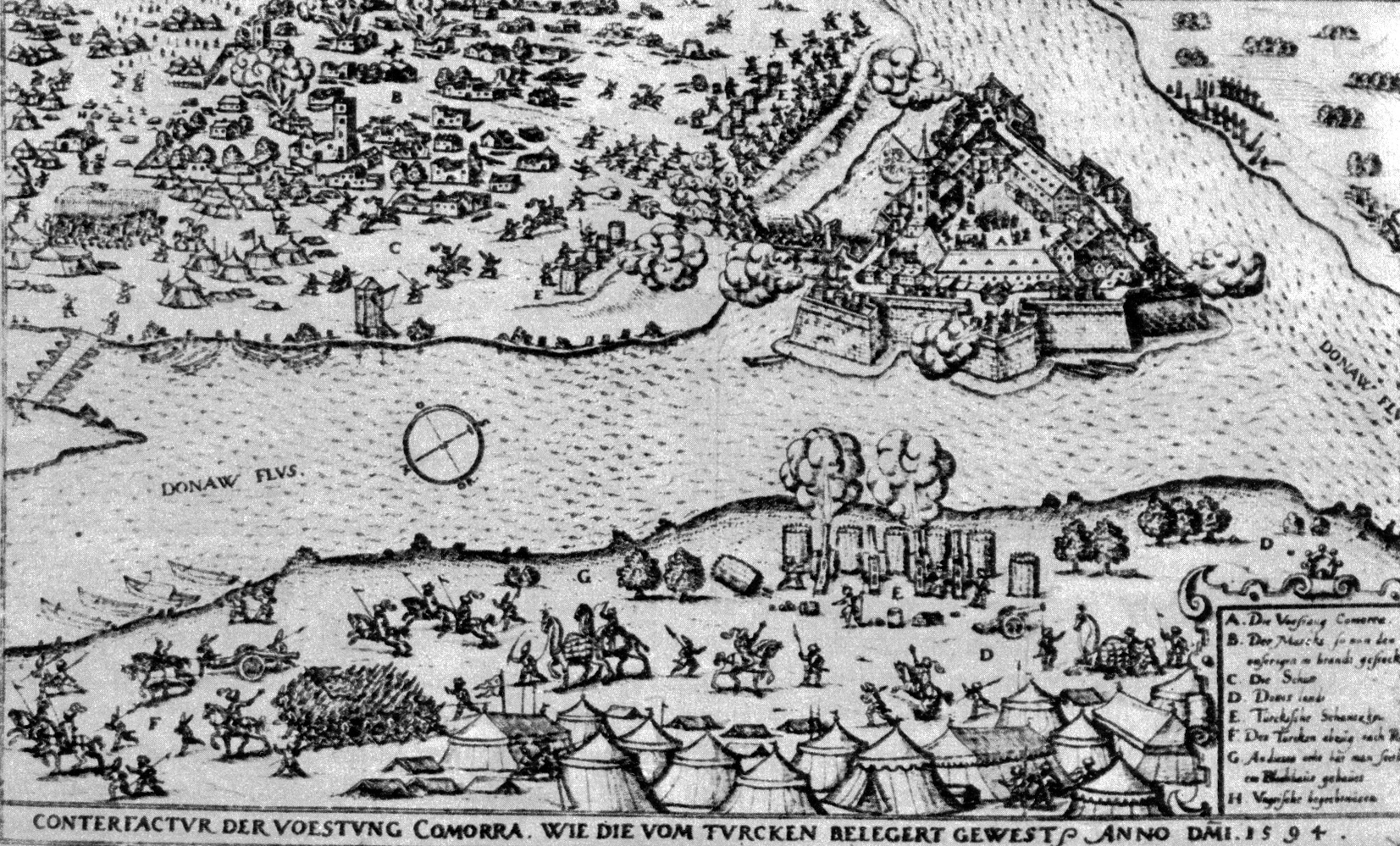
Siege of Komárom Fortress by the Ottoman Turks in 1594

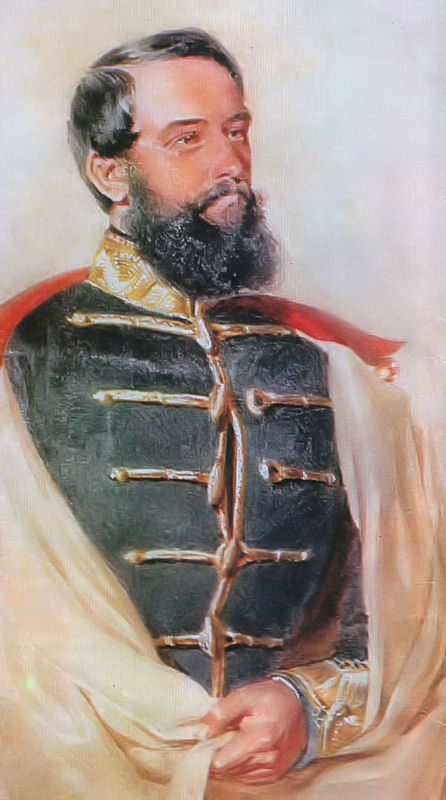
General György Klapka

King Béla IV, in his charter of 1 April 1265, granted the settlement town status and privileges. These privileges contributed to the development of medieval Komárom, helping it establish a flourishing trade market and craft industry. Medieval Komárom prospered, especially under the reign of Mathias Corvinus. He built a Renaissance palace within the castle complex and frequented it for rest and pleasure. Mathias Corvinus also established the royal Danube flotilla, which used the town as its main base during the Ottoman wars. In the 16th century, Komárom became one of the centers of defense for the Habsburg Empire against the expansion of the Ottoman Empire. During the middle of the 16th century, under the reign of Ferdinand I, the medieval castle was rebuilt into a well-defensible fortification. However, it was occupied by Ottomans between 1594 and 1599. The rebuilt fortification became known as the Old Fortress when, in the 17th century, it was enlarged and expanded to form the New Fortress. In 1663, Komárom became the seat of the Captaincy of Lower Hungary. Both the Old and New Fortresses successfully resisted the attacks of the Turkish army during the course of the Turkish wars. In the 18th century, after the end of the Turkish wars and expulsion of the Turks from the region, Komárom, one of the biggest towns in the country, again began to flourish. Maria Theresa's charter of 16 March 1745 granted Komárom the status and privilege of a free royal town. Komárom was soon influenced by the Baroque styles that represented and characterized the Habsburg Empire and its territories. The local nobles and burgers built palaces, and the newly arrived Trinitarians, Franciscans, and Jesuits built churches.

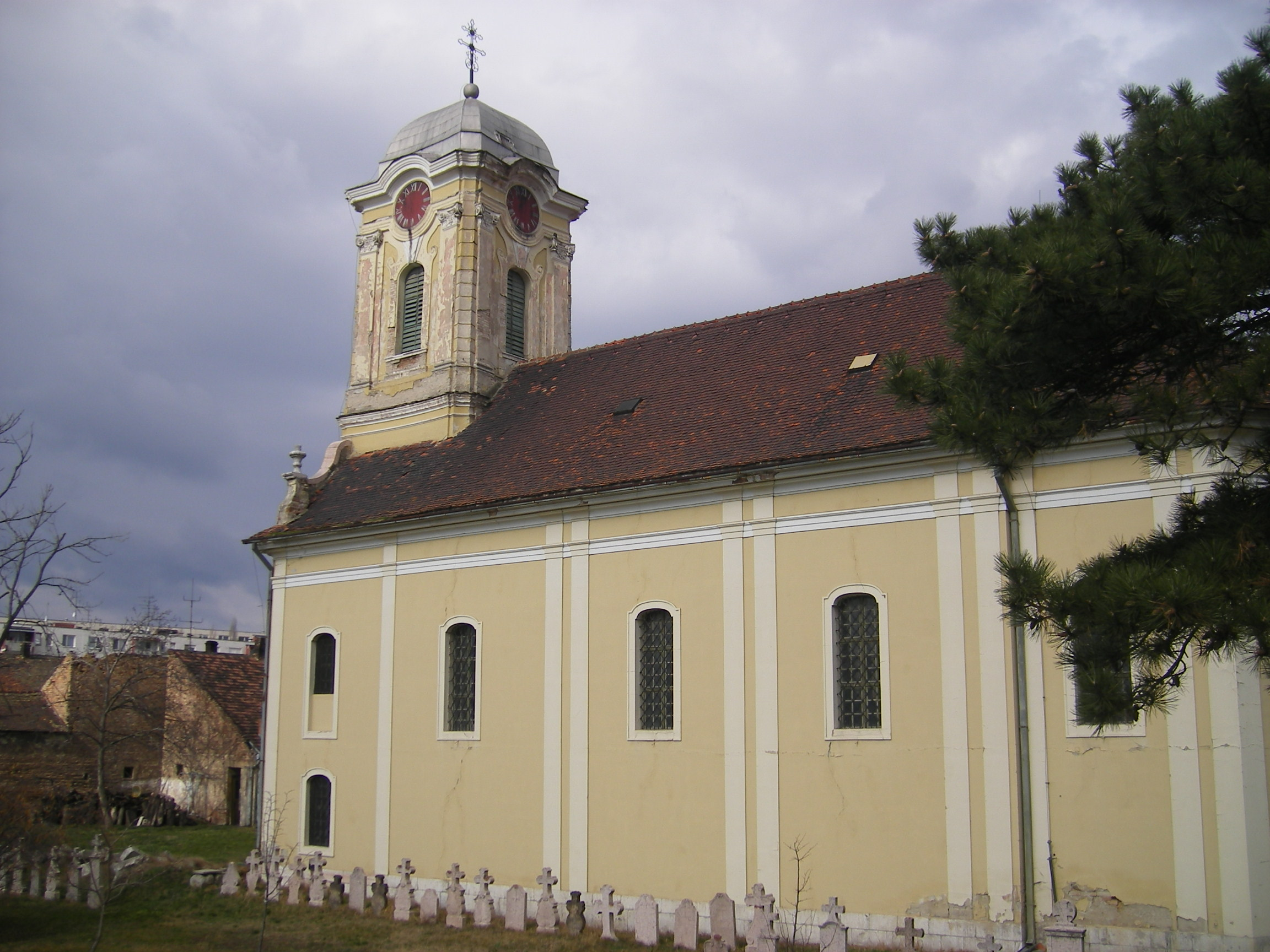
Serbian Church of the Dormition of the Theotokos in Komarno, mid-18th century

During the 18th century, Komárom experienced many natural disasters, including floods, fires, earthquakes, and cholera and plague epidemics. Most notable of these natural disasters were the two earthquakes that destroyed the town in 1763 and 1783. Despite these calamities, Komárom continued to be an important center for trade and crafts until the middle of the 19th century. Beginning in the early 19th century, the fortifications surrounding Komárom underwent extensive reconstruction. The reconstruction was interrupted by the Hungarian Revolution of 1848. Komárom played a significant role in the revolution, remaining the last bastion of the Hungarian resistance against the Austrians until 1849, when the fortress and town were finally surrendered. Captain György Klapka handed over the fortress to the Austrians only after a statement that for every person in the fortress, a free withdrawal and a passport would be granted. The town was destroyed by the Austrian bombardment and left destitute. During the years of Austrian absolutism, Komárom quickly became a strategic military base. Various military buildings were constructed, and in 1876, reconstruction of the fortification system was completed. The town itself only slowly recovered from the destruction of the war. It lost its former economic importance and influence as a major town of the region.

=== 20th century ===
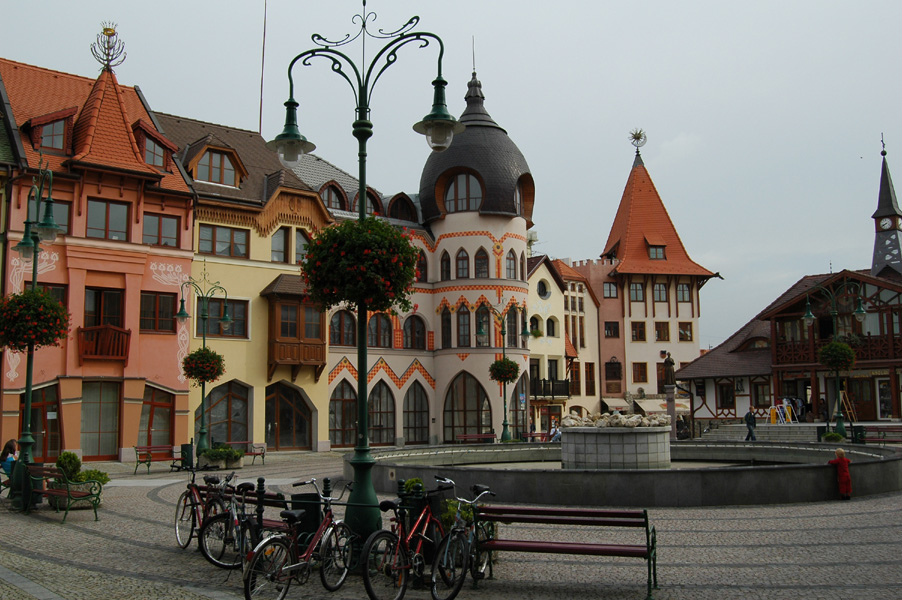
Komárom town centre

Komárom's recovery began at the end of the 19th century and the beginning of the 20th century, when construction of iron bridges across the Danube and Váh began, as well as the first railway lines linking Komárom to the rest of the Austro-Hungarian Empire. It soon became an important transport junction, attracting industry and trade. In 1896, the town of Újszőny on the south side of the Danube was combined with Komárom, allowing the town to expand its territory and development across the Danube.

With the disintegration of the Austro-Hungarian Empire at the end of the First World War, Komárno found itself under new rule. The forming of Czechoslovakia, whose natural border in the south became the River Danube, separated Komárno from its southern half. In 1919 (confirmed by the Treaty of Trianon in 1920), the territory to the north of the Danube was ceded to Czechoslovakia, with the territory to the south of the Danube remaining in Hungary. The town on the northern shore was renamed to Komárno (today the Slovak name of the town), and in 1923 it was reduced from a county seat to a district seat. Although this resulted in a dramatic change in the national composition of Komárno, the majority remained Hungarian.

In fact, Komárno became the centre of cultural and social life of the Hungarians in Czechoslovakia. In 1938, under the First Vienna Award of that year, Komárno (now again as Komárom) was 'returned' to the Kingdom of Hungary. Its former name and status of town and county seat of the Komárom county were restored. At the onset of the Second World War, Komárno/Komárom became a military centre for the Germans and eventually the frontline for the Germans defending the oil refineries to the south. Although there was no heavy fighting in the Komárom area, it was bombarded several times. The bridges connecting the two territories were destroyed, and most of the territory lying on the south bank of the Danube lay in ruins. After the war, the territory on the north bank of the Danube became part of Czechoslovakia again, and the town's name was changed to Komárno. After the war, large-scale reconstruction of Komárno's industries began. The reconstruction of the SLKB Komarno - Slovak Shipyard Komárno, the town's largest industrial facility, was completed in 1950 and greatly promoted the economic development of the town. New factories were constructed on the west side of town near the shipyard, creating a new industrial district. An urban development plan was implemented as well. Residential districts were created with new housing estates, and wide roads were laid across the town.

The two towns used to be a border crossing between Czechoslovakia (today Slovakia) and Hungary, until both countries became part of the Schengen Area, resulting in all immigration and customs checks being lifted on 12 December 2007.

Komárno and Komárom are connected by three bridges: The older Elizabeth bridge, built in 1892, a railway bridge, and the newer Monostor Bridge, completed in 2020. There is a lifting bridge over the harbour.

== Sights ==
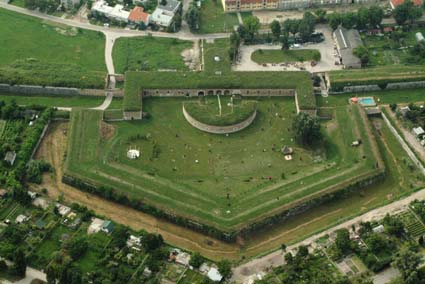
Komárom Fortress: 5. bastion of the Palatine's line

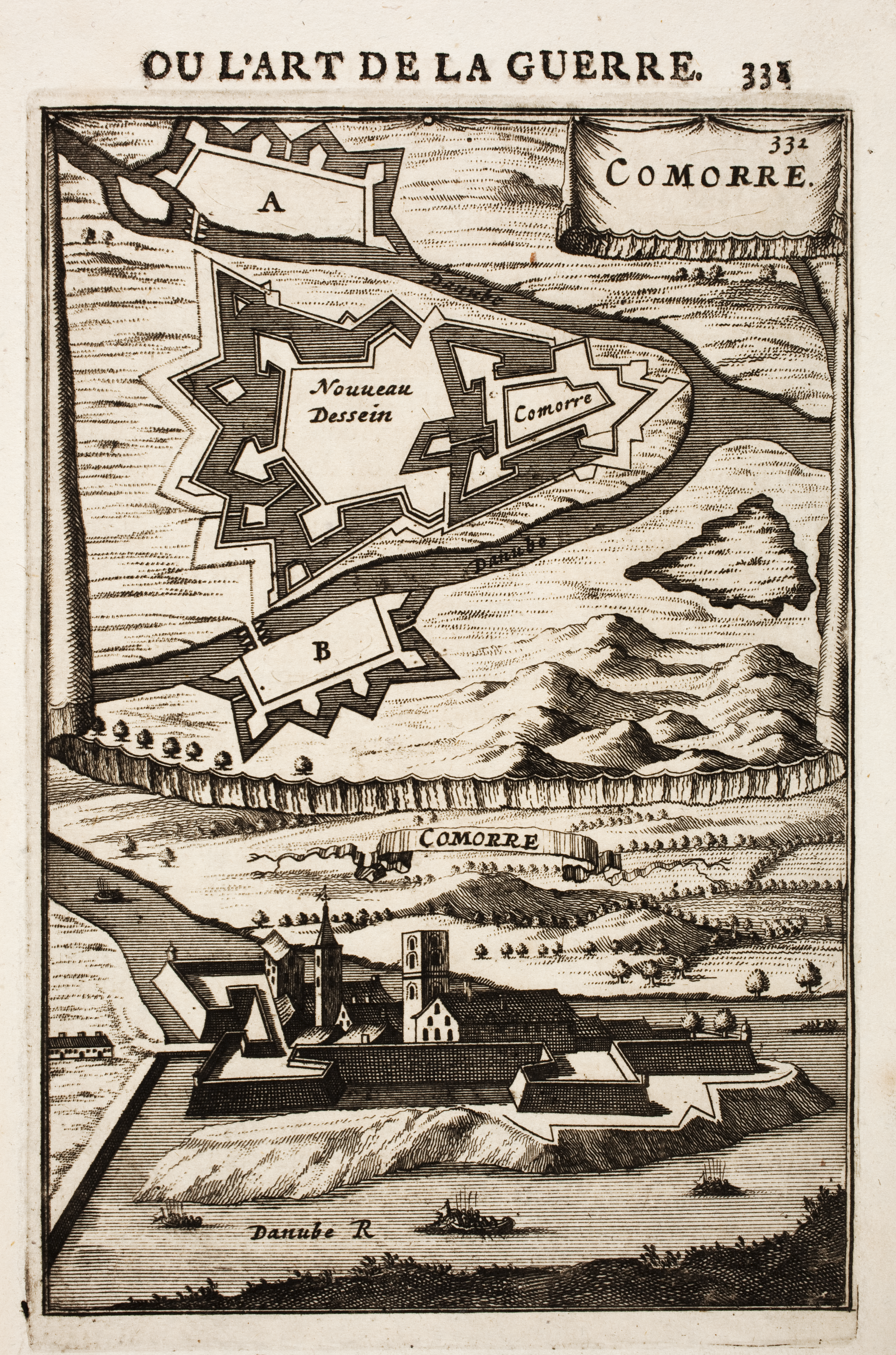
Komárom Fortress ("Comorre"). Engraving from Manesson: Art de la Guerre, 1696

The majority of the historical and cultural sites, including the town center of the former Komárom, have been well preserved and remain so to this day.

- The whole modern fortification system in Komárno represents a very important monument in Slovakia and also in Hungary, with relatively well-preserved elements. The bastion-type fortresses in Komárno were built from the 16th century until the end of the 19th century. The first fortress of this type in Central Europe was the Old Fortress, which was completed by the so-called New Fortress in the 17th century. Komárno and Komárom were one city during the Austria-Hungary era, that's why there are additionally three fortresses on the Hungary bank of the Danube river, Star (Hungarian: Csillag), Igmand, and Monostor.
- Europe place – The Europe Place in Komárno belongs to modern monuments in the Danube Region. It is an unusual collection of buildings typical of many European countries. Every single house on The Europe Place represents one of the 36 countries and regions through a distinctive architectural feature. In the courtyard, there is a Sculpture gallery "Europe", which presents the monarchs and famous historical figures.
- Danube Region Museum – exhibitions: The historical development of Komárno and its environs from the prehistoric age until 1849 and the ethnography of the region. There can be seen a selection from the museum's archaeological collections in the first three rooms of the exhibition. The Celtic, the Roman, and the late-Avar finds are more remarkable. In the next two rooms, guild relics, things from the times of the Turkish expansion, and others connected with the history of the Komárno castle can be found. The historical gallery - A selection from the earliest and most valuable works of the collections of the fine arts from the 18th century to the beginning of the 20th century can be seen in the Ceremonial Hall of the museum.
- Building of the Museum and Bibliothek – This building was built in the 19th century in the romantic style and originally functioned as a tax office. The house of Kálmán Ghyczy stood once in this place, who was a representative of the town, a Member of Parliament, and a financial minister. Here is one of the departments of the Szinnyei Library on the ground floor today, and we can see the nicest pictures of the Museum's gallery on the first floor.
- Calvinist Church – The church was built in Classicist style. They started to build it in March 1787, and already in September 1788, it was consecrated. The tower was built in 1832 from stone, and it was the highest point in the town at that time.
- Elisabeth Bridge – The bridge is built over the River Danube. For more than 100 years, it has been linking two cities that once formed one city and were divided by the first Czechoslovak Republic. The name "Elizabeth" was given to it after the Empress Elisabeth of Austria, who was also Queen of Hungary. It is a border bridge between Komárno and Komárom. At the midway point of the bridge is a line that divides Slovakia from Hungary.
- Filagory of Mór Jókai – Móric Jókai, commonly known as Mór Jókai, the "great storyteller", was a famous Hungarian writer. He was born in Komárno. The island, Elizabeth Island, "as the people of Komárno know," had a strong influence on the young writer. Here, on the island, was the Beöthy-garden, where the literary elite regularly met to discuss the political, economic, philosophical, and literary issues of the era.
- Klapka Square – Today's square was created at the site of a small lake, which was formerly protected by the walls of the medieval city. A marketplace was created there later. On the north side of it, at the end of the 17th century, there was a town hall for council meetings. In 1725, it was rebuilt. After major damage caused by the earthquake in 1763, it was restored in 1766 and supplemented in the following year by a fire guard tower. After a fire in 1848, the building was renovated again, but it was necessary to enlarge it, so in 1875 it was updated by a new watchtower, creating a town hall in the way we know it today. In the window of its tower, from the New Year's Eve 1999, between 10 am – 4 pm every two hours, a figure of a hussar from 1848/49 appears in two-hour intervals and plays a song written for the hero Klapka.
- Limes Gallery – The church was built in 1677 by the Franciscans. Under the construction of the temple was a funeral purpose serving, which was held after the flood in 1965. In 2001, the management of the town of Komárno commissioned the Civic Association Pro Arte Danubii to transform the church into a place for the presentation of cultural values. The building was then renamed to Gallery Limes. Its mission is to present contemporary domestic fine arts.
- Officer's Pavilon – The 19th-century neogothic-style building served as a residence for officers and their families of the imperial and royal army, who served in the fortress of Komárno. On the ground floor, there was an officer's casino. On the front of the building, you can see the inscription VIRIBUS UNITIS (in unity is the power), which was the slogan of Emperor Franz Joseph I.
- Palace Zichy – The building of the Zichy palace was built on the main square of Komárno, and for centuries it played an important role in the history of the city, being used as a theater, residence, synagogue, post office, cellar, and for various other purposes. On 28 June 1763, a huge earthquake struck Komarno. Zichy's palace was also damaged by the earthquake. According to the sources, today's building was rebuilt in 1775 by Ferenc Zichy in a classicist style. Today, the palace is used by the Danube museum, where visitors can find an exhibition about the local history and the memorial rooms of the natives of Komarno, Mór Jókai, and Franz Lehár.
- Roman Lapidarium – The Roman Lapidary has been awaiting its visitors since 1993 in the south rondella of the rebuilt Bastion VI. Most of the carved stone monuments date back to the 2 – 4 century AD and come from the two fortifications protecting the one-time border of the Roman Empire.
- St Andreas Cathedral – On the site of today's church stood an older church, which was destroyed by the Turks in 1594. The church and a monastery were completed in 1763 thanks to the Jesuits. In 1763, an earthquake struck the church, but it did not deter the Jesuits from rebuilding the church. The fire in 1848 seriously damaged the church. It was rebuilt with charity in 1860.
- St Rozália Church – The church was built between 1839 and 1844 in Classicist style, probably after the plans of John Pack, who was the second main architect of the Esztergom Basilica. In the courtyard of the church is a Calvary of 14 stations, which, together with the façade of the church, was restored in 2010.
- Statue of Béni Egressy – In the year of the 170th anniversary of the Hungarian War of Independence of 1848/1849, the nearly three-meter-long statue of Béni Egressy was inaugurated, the work of the sculptor János Nagy.
- Statue of Mihály Csokonai Vitéz – Hungarian poet
- Statue of Ferenc Lehár – The king of operettas from Komárno
- Statue of György Klapka and the Town Hall – Today's square was created at the site of a small lake, which was formerly protected by the walls of the medieval city. A marketplace was created there later. On the north side of it, at the end of the 17th century, there was a town hall for council meetings. In 1725, it was rebuilt. After major damage caused by the earthquake in 1763, it was restored in 1766 and supplemented in the following year by a fire guard tower. After a fire in 1848, the building was renovated again, but it was necessary to enlarge it, so in 1875 it was updated by a new watchtower, creating a town hall in the way we know it today.
- Statue of Hungarian King László V (Ladislaus the Posthumous) – Ladislaus was the posthumous son of Albert I of Hungary (Albert II of Germany / Albert V of Austria) and Elizabeth of Luxembourg (daughter of Sigismund of Luxembourg, Holy Roman Emperor). Ladislaus was born on 22 February 1440 in Komárno, 4 months after the death of his father.
- Statue of St. Stephan – Opposite the Park of Franz Lehár, there is the statue of St. Stephan, the first Hungarian king.
- Statue of Mór Jókai – Hungarian writer
- Statue of the Stone Virgin – The statue of a young girl, which symbolises the invincibility of the Fortress, is located on the westernmost tip of the Madonna Bastion in the New Fortress. The girl holds a laurel wreath in her hand, and there is a Latin inscription "NEC ARTE NEC MARTE" under the statue, which means: Neither by trick nor by force.
- Synagogue – Today, the center of Jewish religious and cultural life in Komárno, Menház is the compound, built in 1896, that comprises the former Jewish old age home and its synagogue.
- The Court of Komárno – This palace was built in neorenaissance style in the 19th century, as it can be seen on the marble table placed in the vestibule. The District Court and the District Prosecution reside here to this day.
- The Rental Building of the First Savings-Bank in Komárno – It was built in the 19th century according to the plans of Béla Ney, an architect from Budapest. At first, the eclectic building was the home of the First Savings Bank, then after the nationalization, several ambulances of the District Health Centre (so-called policlinic) settled here. Since 2011, it has been the property of the town of Komárno.
- The Statue of Holy Trinity – The inscription of this statue states that it was built to commemorate a victory over rebels (the Habsburg victory against the supporters of Rákóczy's War of Independence) in 1703. From 1710, another danger threatened the population: the plague epidemic arrived in Komárno. There was a day when over half of a hundred people became victims of the disease. Immediately after the plague epidemic, only a wooden trinity statue was temporarily built on the city market. The stoned version of the present sculpture was completed in 1715 on Sunday, on the day of the Trinity.
- The Water Tower – It was built in 1902 in a romantic style. It stands on one of the highest grounds in town. It is 28 meters high and is the connection point of the two pressure pipes that run through the town. In 1880, the water needs of the town were still supplied by the rivers Danube and Vah.
- Váh Oxbow Lake – is a body of water located north of Komárno. It was formed in 1973 by damming a branch of the Váh River, creating a separated oxbow lake. A regulated dam controls the mouth of the Komárno Canal, and another dam at the outlet prevents direct swimming access to the Váh River.

== Population ==
Population statistic (10 years)
Year	1995	2005	2015	2025
Count	37,876	36,596	34,333	31,560
Difference		−3.37%	−6.18%	−8.07%

Population statistic
Year	2024	2025
Count	31,880	31,560
Difference		−1.00%

It has a population of 31,560 people (31 December 2025).

=== Ethnicity ===
Census 2021 (1+%)
Ethnicity	Number	Fraction
Hungarian	18,691	56.69%
Slovak	11,082	33.61%
Not found out	4690	14.22%
Total	32,967	

In year 2021 was 32,967 people by ethnicity 18,691 as Hungarian, 11,082 as Slovak, 4690 as Not found out, 248 as Czech, 233 as Romani, 103 as Other, 90 as Vietnamese, 55 as Ukrainian, 51 as German, 36 as Russian, 19 as Polish, 19 as Bulgarian, 17 as Jewish, 17 as Italian, 12 as Rusyn, 10 as Turkish, 9 as Serbian, 9 as Moravian, 7 as Romanian, 6 as Croatian, 5 as English, 4 as Korean, 4 as Albanian, 3 as Chinese, 2 as Irish, 2 as Austrian, 2 as Canadian, 2 as Greek, 2 as French and 1 as Silesian.

Note on population: The difference values of population numbers in the table "Population statistic" and in the sections "Ethnicity" & "Religion" is caused by the use of various statistical methods.

In 2004, the first Hungarian-language university in Slovakia since 1919, the J. Selye University was established in Komárno. Serbs of Slovakia have had their seat in the town since the 15th century.

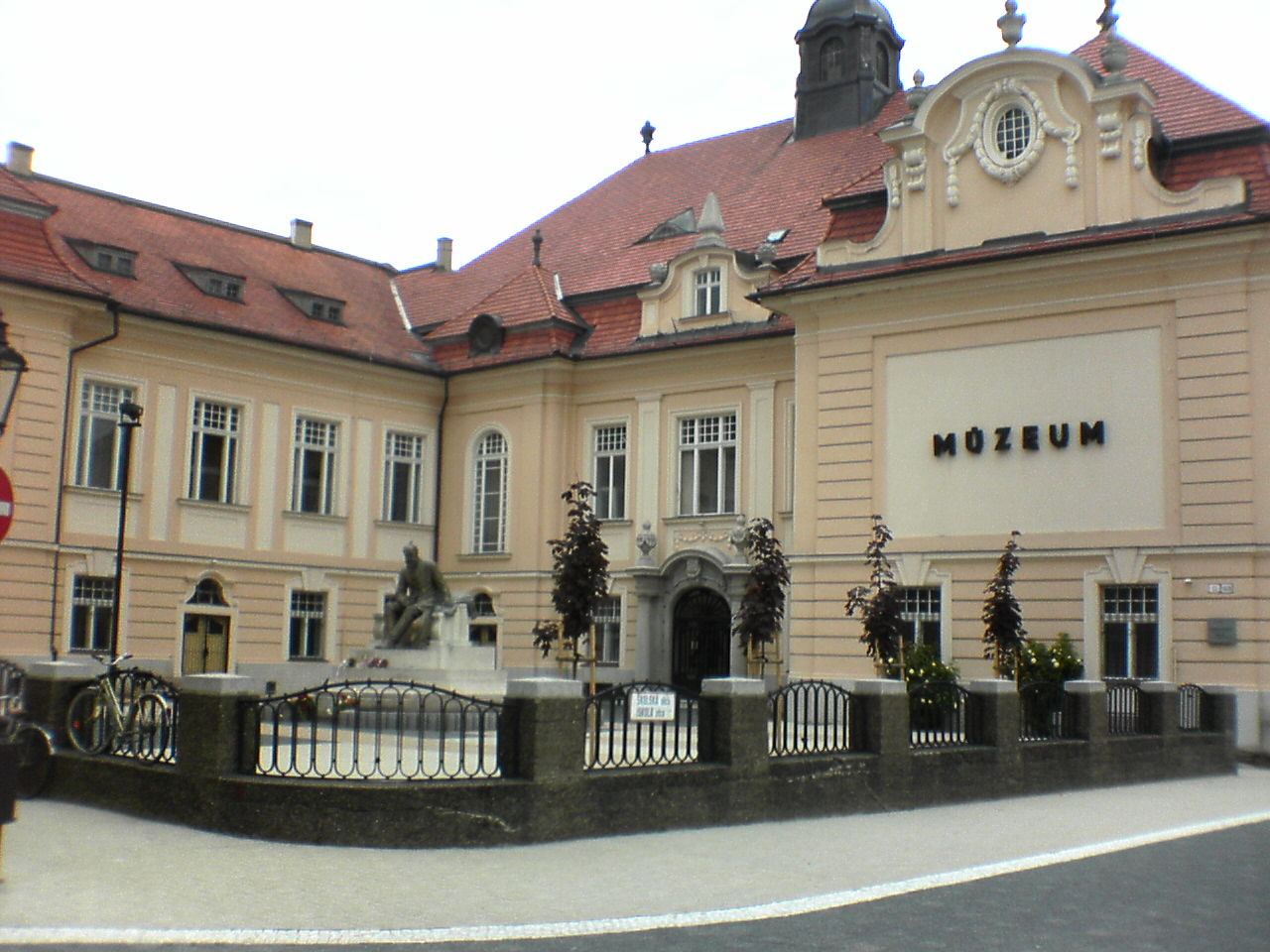
the Danube Museum

=== Religion ===
Census 2021 (1+%)
Religion	Number	Fraction
None	12,086	36.66%
Roman Catholic Church	11,330	34.37%
Not found out	4370	13.26%
Calvinist Church	3345	10.15%
Evangelical Church	782	2.37%
Total	32,967	

In year 2021 was 32,967 people by religion 12,086 from None, 11,330 from Roman Catholic Church, 4370 from Not found out, 3345 from Calvinist Church, 782 from Evangelical Church, 278 from Greek Catholic Church, 123 from Jehovah's Witnesses, 105 from Baptists Church, 91 from Christian Congregations in Slovakia, 78 from Eastern Orthodox Church, 78 from Other and not ascertained christian church, 68 from Other, 49 from Buddhism, 36 from Ad hoc movements, 30 from Old Catholic Church, 24 from Islam, 23 from Jewish community, 23 from United Methodist Church, 18 from Apostolic Church, 13 from Paganism and natural spirituality, 10 from Hinduism, 5 from Czechoslovak Hussite Church, 1 from Church of Jesus Christ of Latter-day Saints and 1 from Bahá'i Community.

== Notable people ==
- Alžbeta Brezáková (1921 – 2015), third wife of Ferdinand I of Bulgaria
- Richard Guyon (1813–1856), British-born Hungarian soldier, general in the Hungarian revolutionary army
- Gavril Stefanović Venclović (1670–1749), Serbian philosopher, priest, and philanthropist
- Baron Pavle Davidović (1737–1814), Serbian general, Knight of the Military Order of Maria Theresa
- Moriz Ludassy (Gans) (1825–1885), journalist
- Mór Jókai (1825–1904), one of the greatest Hungarian writers
- Hans Selye (1907–1982), biologist
- Franz Lehár (1870–1948), operetta composer, was born here
- Endre Komáromi Kacz (1880–1969), painter, was born here
- Mónika Kovacsicz (1983), handball player
- Ivan Reitman (1946–2022), film producer and director, was born here
- Zuzana Marošová (1981), Slovak actress
- Vladimír Matejička (1956–2025), Slovak politician
- Tamás Priskin (1986), Hungarian footballer
- Yehoshua Stampfer (1852–1908) Jewish Zionist activist, renewer of Jewish agriculture in Ottoman Palestine, one of the founders of the city of Petah Tikva
- Ladislaus the Posthumous (1440–1457) King of Hungary, Bohemia, and Croatia from 1440 to 1457, was born here

== Twin towns – sister cities ==
Komárno is twinned with:

- Blansko, Czech Republic
- Komárom, Hungary
- Kralupy nad Vltavou, Czech Republic
- Lieto, Finland
- Sebeş, Romania
- Terezín, Czech Republic
- Weissenfels, Germany

== See also ==
- List of municipalities and towns in Slovakia
- Pevnosť Komárno

== Genealogical resources ==
The records for genealogical research are available at the state archive "Statny Archiv in Nitra, Slovakia"

- Roman Catholic church records (births/marriages/deaths): 1621–1916 (parish A)
- Greek Catholic church records (births/marriages/deaths): 1740–1894 (parish A)
- Lutheran church records (births/marriages/deaths): 1783–1908 (parish A)
- Reformed church records (births/marriages/deaths): 1827–1895 (parish AB)
