= 1763 Komárom earthquake =

Earthquake affecting Hungary

- Location within Hungary
- Local date: June 28, 1763
- Local time: 05:28
- Magnitude: 6.2 to 6.5 M_{w}
- Depth: 15.0 km (9.3 mi)
- Epicenter: 47.73°N 18.15°E
- Areas affected: Kingdom of Hungary
- Max. intensity: EMS-98 IX (Destructive)
- Casualties: 83

The 1763 Komárom earthquake occurred on 28 June between 5 and 6 in the morning, in or near the town of Komárom in Komárom County in the Kingdom of Hungary, close to the current border with Slovakia. The earthquake has been estimated at 6.2 to 6.5 on the moment magnitude scale (M_{w}).

== Background ==
The Komárom earthquake was an intraplate earthquake in the Pannonian Basin associated with the Rába-Hurbanovo tectonic zone, which separates the Internal Western Carpathians and the Central Western Carpathians crustal blocks. This zone was formed during the Cretaceous as a fold and thrust belt, which was later reactivated as a backthrust or a strike-slip zone during the Paleogene to Early Miocene. It was further reactivated as a normal fault during the development of the Danube basin as part of the overall Pannonian Basin. Earthquakes in the region are caused by deformation resulting from the movement of the Adriatic plate relative to the Eurasian plate.

Earthquakes were observed in the Komárom area in 1754, 1757 and 1759. By 1758, the perceived earthquake risk was high enough that a church ceremony was held in an attempt to ward off a major earthquake.

Large parts of Hungary are covered by a layer of Holocene fluvial sediments, with an elevated ground water level. This makes many areas vulnerable to soil liquefaction during earthquake shaking.

== Earthquake ==
The magnitude of the earthquake has been estimated from the intensities based on contemporary reports, ranging from 5.7 M_{w} (SHEEC) catalogue, to 6.5 M_{w}. The focal depth has also been estimated from intensity distributions, varying from 7.6 km to 15 km. The 1763 earthquake accounts for about 80% of all the seismic moment released in the Komárom area since 1599. Due to the lack of seismologic instruments in 1763, the mechanism of and depth of the earthquake are not known with any certainty, though most earthquakes in the region occur in the upper 20 km of crust. It was the largest event known from the Pannonian Basin in the last thousand years.

There was a strong foreshock about 15 minutes before the mainshock. Many aftershocks were recorded after the event.

Recent probabilistic analyses have applied structural fragility functions to the 1763 Komárom earthquake in order to refine its magnitude estimate. Morais and colleagues (2017) developed analytical fragility functions by modelling a typical one‑storey commoners' house archetype—representative of the adobe masonry dwellings in Komárom—using dynamic structural analysis in OpenSees (a software framework for earthquake simulation) and 30 site‑specific ground‑motion records for the region. Combining these functions with contemporary damage reports (which record that some 91 % of the town's 1169 houses were affected, including 279 total collapses and 353 partial collapses) and central European attenuation relations, the study obtained preliminary magnitude estimates of Mw 6.20–6.97 for an epicentral distance of 10 km and Mw 6.44–7.08 for 12 km. When uncertainties in damage‑state counts, material properties and choice of attenuation model were fully incorporated, the posterior mean magnitude was calculated at about 6.4 with a standard deviation of about 0.6.

The maximum estimated intensity is IX on the European Macroseismic Scale (EMS-98) for Komárom. An intensity of VIII has been estimated for Madar and Perbete, VII–VIII for Komáromszentpéter and Hidaskürt and VII for Izsa, Győr and Érsekújvár.

Based on contemporary reports soil liquefaction effects were observed over an area of about 400 km^{2}.

== Impact ==
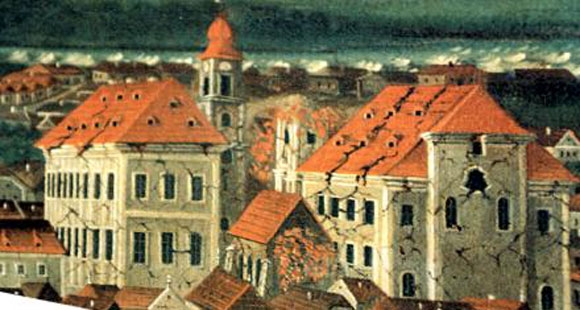
Detail of contemporary painting of damage to Komárom

Damage in Komárom was extensive, with 279 houses completely collapsing out of the 1169 houses in the city. A further 353 houses suffered partial collapse, 213 required major repairs and 219 needed only minor repairs. Multistory buildings were particularly badly affected. The houses in the city were described as strongly-built before the earthquake due to the possibility of coming under siege. Contemporary reports note that seven churches collapsed and that the newly constructed Jesuit church and college were heavily damaged, including the collapse of two towers onto a neighboring school, which killed several people.

Győr suffered widespread damage, with no buildings in the central part of the city escaping some effects of the earthquake. As with Komárom, the larger the building, the greater the damage. Both the Episcopal Palace and the Carmellite church were severely damaged.

The earthquake killed 63 people in Komárom and 102 people were wounded. 85 deaths have been mentioned in another source and estimates of the total death toll reach 200–300. Four deaths were also reported from Gjőr.

== See also ==
- 1956 Budapest earthquake
- Geology of the Western Carpathians
- List of historical earthquakes
