= Matejička =

Matejička or Matejicka is a surname. Notable people with the surname include:

- Deb Matejicka (fl. 2001), Canadian sports journalist
- Vladimír Matejička (1956–2025), Slovak politician
