= Szarvas inscription =

Historical inscription

The Szarvas inscription refers to the inscription on a bone needle case found near Szarvas in southeastern Hungary and dating from the second half of the 8th century, the "Late Avar" period (700–791).

== The needle case and its inscription ==
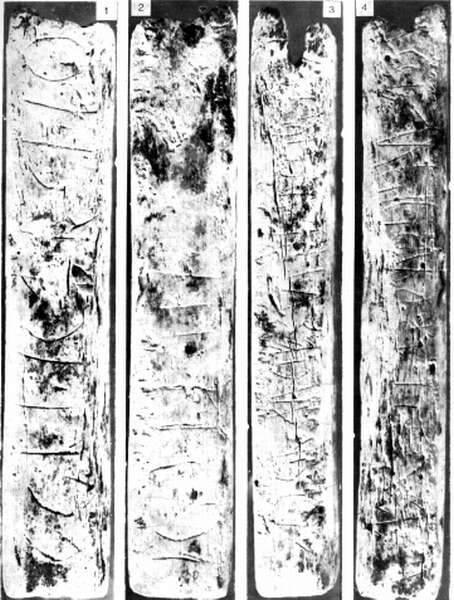
The bone needle case of Szarvas

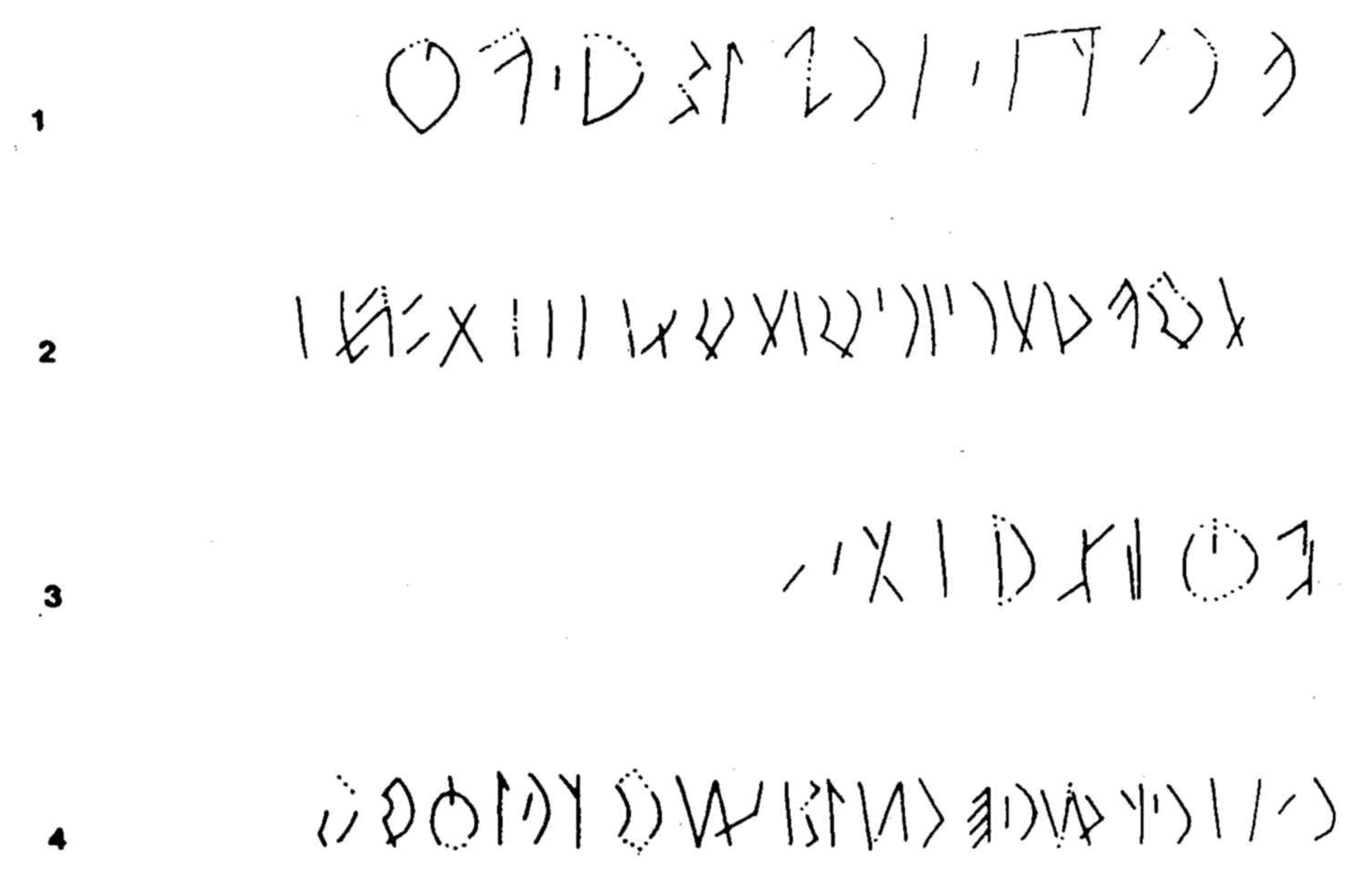
Drawing of the inscription made by the archeologist and historian István Erdélyi in 1984. The edges of the bone needle case are worn, and the top and bottom edges for part of the characters are not clearly visible.

== The name of the script of the Szarvas inscription ==
The Hungarian archeologist, historian and linguist Gábor Vékony named the script used on the needle case as "Kárpát-medencei rovásírás" ("Carpathian Basin Rovas script"). He often used this term in his book, A székely írás emlékei, kapcsolatai, története, e.g. in the chapter "A kárpát-medencei rovásábécé korabeli feljegyzése" ("The contemporary record of the Carpathian Basin Rovas alphabet").

Vékony analysed the similarities and the differences between the Old Hungarian and the Carpathian Basin scripts on page 154 of his book. On page 232, Vékony wrote: "- Aethicus Ister jelei azonosak az egykori Kárpát-medencei rovásírás jeleivel." ("The symbols of Aethicus Ister are identical to the symbols of the quondam Carpathian Basin script").

Vékony also writes : "E jel a Szarvason azonosított Kárpát-medencei f alig torzult megfelelője..." ("This symbol is identical to the Carpathian Basin 'f' identified in Szarvas". (referring to the bone needle case found in Szarvas)

In page 233, Vékony writes: "Erre utalhat az is, hogy ez a betűalak levezethető egy párthus alep formából. Feltehető tehát ennek a jelnek a megléte a Kárpát-medencei rovásírásban is (a székelybe is innen származhatott)." ("This could imply also that this glyph can be derived from the Parthian Aleph form. Consequently, the existence of this symbol can be supposed in the Carpathian Basin script as well (it could originate from this to the Székely)." Here the 'Szekely' refers to the Szekely-Hungarian Rovas script also known as Old Hungarian script. Vékony's writing suggests a proposal that a Carpathian Basin Rovas script may be one of the ancestors of the Szekely-Hungarian Rovas script.

== The meaning of the inscription ==
Gábor Vékony's transcription was improved by linguist Erzsébet Zelliger. The last character of the fourth row of the inscription was reconstructed by Vékony. The edges of the bone needle case are worn, and the top and bottom edges for part of the characters are not clearly visible.

=== Transcription with IPA notation ===
The following transcription using the International Phonetic Alphabet is based on Vékony's original transcription. Superscript segments and those in brackets are reconstructed.

No. of row	Transcription (using IPA)	Translating from Ancient Hungarian
1st	/ynɡʸr ⁱsn^{ɛ}k im ⁱʎ βᵃʃᵘ/	Szarvas Rovas inscription Row 4
2nd	/[t]ⁱɣ tᵉβ^{ɛ}dɣᵉn ⁱsᵉn tⁱɣ tⁱɣ sᵘr bᵉk βᵒrɣ/	Szarvas Rovas inscription Row 4
3rd	/f^{ɛ}ʃ^{ɛ}s ^{ɛ}lᵉi s^{ɜ}l [...]/	Szarvas Rovas inscription Row 4
4th	/ʸnɡʸr nᵉ adɣᵒn [^{ɜ}zdɣ] imᵉsd ᵉɣt ɛn iʃt^{ɛ}n^{ɛ}[m]/	Szarvas Rovas inscription Row 4

In the inscription, the third symbol of the third row (from left) could be considered a descendant of the ideograms in Turkic languages. However, their possible relationship needs further evidence.

=== Transcription with Hungarian phonetic notation ===
No. of row	Transcription (using Hungarian phonetic notation)	Translating from Ancient Hungarian (modern meaning)
1st	/üng^{ü}r : ⁱsznek im ⁱly : βᵃsᵘ/	Here is an iron [needle] against demon Üngür;
2nd	/[t]ⁱɣ t^{ë}βᵉdγ^{ë}n : ⁱsz^{ë}n : tⁱɣ tⁱɣ szᵘr b^{ë}k βᵒrɣ/	[Needle should be pricked into the demon; needle, needle, stab, poke, sew-[in]!
3rd	/fᵉsᵉsz : ᵉl^{ë}i sz^{ɜ}l [...]/	[Who] unstitches [...];
4th	/^{ü}ng^{ü}r n^{ë} : adɣᵒn : [^{ɜ}zdɣ] im^{ë}szd ^{ë}ɣt en : istᵉnᵉ[m]/	Üngür shall not give [curse]; [...], blast him, my God!

== Critics and alternative theories ==
Vékony had read the Szarvas transcription as Hungarian, thus proposing it as evidence that the Hungarian-speaking people had appeared in the region by the 7th century. There are several critics of Vékony's theories and translations, most notably the Hungarian linguist and historian, András Róna-Tas. The debates were summarized by István Riba in 1999 and 2000: "many find themselves unable to accept Vékony's theory".

The key point of the critics has been that in traditional Hungarian scholarship, the existence of the Hungarian-speaking population dates from 896 (when the Magyars took over the Carpathian Basin ), while the Szarvas needle case dates from the 8th century. Consequently, either the Szarvas inscription is not in Hungarian or Hungarians were in the Carpathian Basin much earlier than the late 9th century. Róna-Tas attempted to read the Szarvas relic in Turkic instead of Hungarian, but wrote that his transcription needed further improvement. The issue remains an open question amongst Hungarian scholars.

== See also ==
- The Alsószentmihály inscription on a building stone found in Mihai Viteazu, Cluj (Transylvania, today Romania).
