= 1956 Budapest earthquake =

Rare and strong earthquake in Hungary

- Location within Hungary
- UTC time: 1956-01-12 05:46:13
- ISC event: 887823
- USGS-ANSS: ComCat
- Local date: 12 January 1956
- Local time: 06:46:13
- Magnitude: 5.8 M_{w}
- Depth: 15 km (9 mi)
- Epicenter: 47.44°N 19.28°E
- Areas affected: Hungary
- Max. intensity: EMS-98 VIII (Heavily damaging)
- Foreshocks: 31 events
- Aftershocks: Hundreds
- Casualties: 2 killed, 38 injured

On 06:46:13 CET on 12 January 1956, a rather unusual earthquake measuring 5.8 on the moment magnitude scale struck just southeast of Budapest under Dunaharaszti at a depth of 15 km. The earthquake had a maximum European macroseismic intensity of VIII (Heavily damaging). The earthquake was felt throughout Hungary other than the eastern and western edges of the country. The event was preceded by 31 other weaker events. There was widespread damage to homes and other structures; two people died and 48 were injured. The earthquake was one of the strongest to ever strike Hungary and the worst during the 20th century.

== Tectonic setting ==
The Hungary region is located within the Pannonian Basin, which is a moderately seismically active basin. The occurrence of a magnitude 6 earthquake averages at 125 years while the occurrence of a magnitude 5 earthquake averages at 15 years. The majority of the landmass of Hungary are low-lying plains, which have been covered by Holocene fluvial and alluvial sediments with a higher ground water table. Therefore, the area is prone to liquefaction which also is proven by the fact that most large, historical quakes in the area had liquefaction.

Seismic analysis shows that there is left lateral shear which creates ENE-WSW faults, right lateral shear creates WNW-ESE trending faults, E-W faults are generally reverse structures. This indicates that Hungary is generally dominated by strike-slip stresses, while slightly rotating and creating dip-slip faults.

== Impacts ==
Two people died and 48 were injured which some were serious injuries. However, many structures were damaged and some destroyed. At the time, a lot of structures in the area were foundationless adobe houses. Five hundred people were left homeless.

=== Geologic impacts ===
As a result of the earthquake, a small 3 cm wide, directed NNE-SSW surface crack was observed in Taksony. Small mud volcanoes with diameters of 4 cm were reported, which was caused by liquefaction, as well as the shallow dug wells that were filled in with sand. In the hot springs of the Rudas Baths in Budapest, the water flow of the springs increased immediately after the quake, which it later settled to its normal level.

=== Damage ===
The building damage from this event mostly occurred in Pest County, specifically in Szigetszentmiklós, Taksony and Dunaharaszti. However, serious damage was also reported in Budapest. 6 houses collapsed and several other buildings were damaged in that area. Electrical network of the city was also damaged. The overhead power lines of the Soroksár suburban railway malfunctioned relative to the electrical network. Parts of the Csepel Automobile Factory were damaged. 3,144 out of 3,500 buildings in Dunaharaszti were damaged or destroyed and were left uninhabitable. Among the damaged buildings, a church in Taksony and the city council building in Dunaharaszti were seriously damaged. Over 50 tombstones in the same area were overturned. Damage from the earthquake were observed as far as Sződliget and Kalocsa where a few poor quality chimneys were damaged.

== Related events ==
Over the next few years, more earthquakes struck the nearby area of the 1956 event, including a 4.8 at Heves County in 2013, a 4.5 at Komárom-Esztergom County in 2011 and a 4.9 at Veszprém County in 1985.

== See also ==
- 1763 Komárom earthquake
- Geology of the Western Carpathians
- List of earthquakes in 1956
