= Serbs in Slovakia =

Srbi na Slovensku Срби у Словачкој Srbi u Slovačkoj
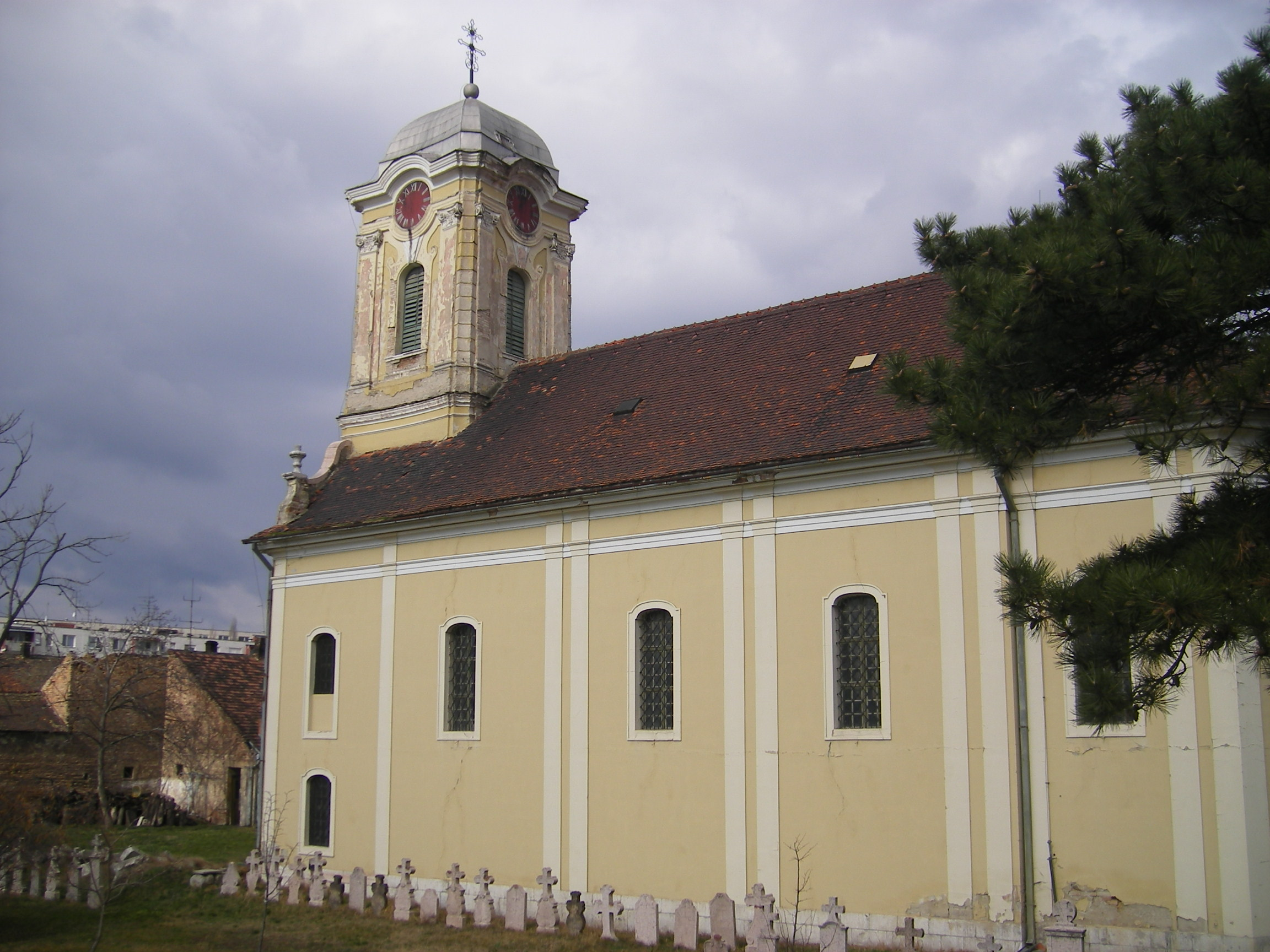
- Former Serbian Orthodox Church of the Dormition of the Theotokos in Komárno

Total population
- 1,876 (2021)

Regions with significant populations
- Bratislava, Komárno

Languages
- Serbian and Slovak

Religion
- Eastern Orthodoxy

Related ethnic groups
- Serbs in the Czech Republic

Serbs are a recognized ethnic minority in Slovakia. According to data from the 2021 census, 1,876 Serbs live in Slovakia, of which 792 declared their Serb ethnicity in combination with another ethnicity. (Note: 1,084 declared exclusive Serb ethnicity while 792 declared it in combination with another ethnicity)

== History ==
In the 18th century, the territory of present-day Slovakia (then under Habsburg rule) became a refuge for a small fraction of Serbs fleeing Ottoman oppression in their homeland. This migration, called the Great Migrations of the Serbs, was not a single organized campaign but a series of waves of migration. Town of Komárno on Danube was a hub for Serb settlers.

In 19th century, the importance of the university in what was then Požun (today's Bratislava) began to attract the Serbian youth who studied there in the absence of Serbian higher education institutions in what was then southern Hungary. In 1866, the Serbian youth association "Sloboda" in Požun was part of the wider "United Serbian Youth"; its "Library of Serbian Youth" was founded in 1841 and closely tied to the Lyceum of Požun. It was closed during the time of the Hungarian revolution, only to be revived again around 1860.

== Demographics ==
Although Serbs are recognized as an autochthonous ethnic group in Slovakia, they mostly consist of recent immigrants and expatriates. They are overwhelmingly located in Bratislava while there is a small number in the southern town of Komárno, where Serbs have been living since the 17th century.

== Culture ==
Serbian language is one of recognized minority languages in Slovakia. It is declared mother tongue of 1,229 people in Slovakia.

== Notable people ==
- Jovan Monasterlija – Habsburg military officer
- Pavle Davidović – Austrian general of the Napoleonic Wars
- Branko Radivojevič – ice hockey player
- Gavril Stefanović Venclović – priest, writer, poet, and philosopher

== See also ==
- Immigration to Slovakia
- Serb diaspora
- Eparchy of Mukachevo and Prešov
- Serbia–Slovakia relations

== Sources ==
- Cerović, Ljubivoje (1997). "Srbi u Slovačkoj" (in Serbian). Ministarstvo Republike Srbije za veze sa Srbima izvan Srbije.
- Cerović, Ljubivoje (1999). Srbi na Slovensku (in Slovak). Kultúra. ISBN 9788671031516.
- Lopušina, M. (May 2014). "Svaki drugi Srbin živi izvan Srbije" [Every second Serb lives outside of Serbia]. Novosti.
