= Koppán (genus) =

Koppán is the name of a Hungarian genus (Clan Koppán) in the Kingdom of Hungary. According to one theory the kindred was called Katapán originally. According to another theory the original was Kupan. The first known ancestor of the family was a legendary tribal chieftain, Ketel. According to Gesta Hungarorum Ketel was of Cuman (Kabar) origin. According to some research, the name of the kindred comes from the Greek or Armenian "catapan" rank. It could also be related to the Turkic title or byname(?) of Qapghan, Qapaghan. Their ancient possessions were located in Komárom county. There are strong indications that the Konkoly-Thege family also belongs to the Koppán genus.

== Notable members of the clan ==
- Ketel
- Alaptolma
- Miklós Konkoly-Thege
