= Kabar =

9th-century Khazar rebels who joined the Magyars and Rus'

The Kabars (Greek: Κάβαροι), also known as Qavars (Qabars) or Khavars, were Khazar rebels who joined Magyar tribes and the Rus' Khaganate confederations in the 9th century CE.

== Sources ==
The Byzantine Emperor Constantine VII is the principal source of the Kabar history. He dedicated a whole chapter—chapter 39—to the Kabars (or Kabaroi) in his De Administrando Imperio, which was completed around 950. The Emperor described the Kabars as "a race of Khazars" who had risen up against the Khagan. When the uprising was crushed, some of them were massacred, but others escaped and joined the Magyars in the Pontic steppes.

== History ==
The Kabars rebelled against the Khazar Khaganate in the early ninth century; the rebellion was notable enough to be described in Constantine Porphyrogenitus's work De Administrando Imperio. Subsequently the Kabars were expelled from Levedia in the Khazar Khaganate leading the Magyar tribal confederacy called Hét-Magyar (meaning "seven Hungarians") to Etelköz while others under Khan-Tuvan sought refuge by joining the Rus' people. One of the names on the Kievian Letter is "Kiabar", showing that some Kabars settled in Kiev with the Rus' as well. According to Magocsi, "A violent civil war took place during the 820s [...] The losers of the internal political struggle, known as Kabars, fled northward to the Varangian Rus' in the upper Volga region, near Rostov, and southward to the Magyars, who formerly had been loyal vassals of the Khazars. The presence of Kabar political refugees from Khazaria among the Varangian traders in Rostov helped to raise the latter's prestige, with the consequence that by the 830s a new power center known as the Rus' Khaganate had come into existence."

In 894, the Byzantine emperor Leo VI, then at war with Simeon, the Bulgarian czar (893–927), called the Hungarians to his aid. The Magyars, led by Árpád, crossed the Danube and attacked Bulgaria. The Bulgarians, in turn, appealed to the Pechenegs, now masters of the steppe, who attacked the Hungarians in the rear. Toward 850 or 860, driven from Levedia by the Pechenegs, they entered Atelkuzu (Etelköz) taking refuge in the mountains of Transylvania. At that moment, Arnulf, duke of Carinthia, at war with the Slav ruler Svatopluk, prince of Great Moravia (885–894), decided like the Byzantines to appeal to the Hungarians. The Hungarians overcame Svatopluk, who disappeared in the conflict (895). The Magyars reached the Danube river basin around 880. As the vanguard and rearguard, the Kabars, or Cowari as they were known in Latin, assisted in the Magyar invasion of Pannonia and the subsequent formation of the Principality of Hungary in the late 9th century. Great Moravia collapsed, and the Hungarians took up permanent abode in Hungary (907).

The presence of a Turkic aristocracy among the Hungarians could explain the Byzantine protocol by which, in the exchange of ambassadors under Constantine Porphyrogenitus, Hungarian rulers were always referred to as "Princes of the Turks".

== Archaeological theories on religion ==
At least some of the Khazar elite apparently converted to Judaism, but this might not have included Kabars. The conversion did not seem to have impacted most of the population in the Khazar Khaganate: paganism remained as the religion of the majority of the population, and there were also notable Christian and Muslim groups. Since the conversion to Judaism was initiated by the ruler, the theory that the rebels against the ruler would have joined to the conversion has been questioned. There is also debate about the date of Kabars joining to Magyars and it could have happened before the Khazar elite's conversion. Still, according to a theory, graves with Jewish symbols found in modern-day Čelarevo, Serbia could be related to Kabars.

The Kabars supposedly left scattered remains and some cultural and linguistic imprints, but this is debatable.

== See also ==
- Alsószentmihály inscription
- Ketel
- Hungarians
- Árpád dynasty
- Aba (genus)
- Koppán (genus)
- Palóc
- Khalyzians
- Bulgars
- Pannonian Avars
- Khazars
- Pechenegs
- Turkic peoples
- Székelys

== Sources ==
- Golden, Peter B. (1980). Khazar Studies: An Historico-Philological Inquiry into the Origins of the Khazars, Volume 1. Akadémiai Kiadó. ISBN 963-05-1549-0.
- Kristó, Gyula (1996). Hungarian History in the Ninth Century. Szegedi Középkorász Muhely. ISBN 963-482-113-8.
