= Gábor Vékony =

Hungarian historian, archaeologist and linguist (1944–2004)

Gábor Vékony (December 15, 1944, Csengőd – June 10, 2004) was a Hungarian historian, archaeologist and linguist, associate professor at Faculty of Humanities of the Eötvös Loránd University, Candidate of Sciences in History. He was an expert of the rovás scripts and a researcher of Hungarian prehistory.

== Life and career ==
He attended elementary school in Tabdi and secondary school in Kiskőrös. He graduated from the Eötvös Loránd University of Budapest (ELTE) with a degree in archaeology and history in 1968. He obtained his PhD in 1969. From 1968 he worked in the Kuny Domokos Museum in Tata. From 1970 until his death in 2004 he was an associate professor of the Department of Archaeology and the Department of Ancient History at ELTE.

== Rovas inscriptions ==
Prof. Vékony deciphered several Rovas inscriptions, e.g. Szarvas inscription and Alsószentmihály inscription.

== His works ==
- 1970 Lábatlan-Rózsa Ferenc utca (Komárom m., dorogi j.) RFüz I: 23. 1970. 9.
- 1970 Vespasianus-kori építési felirat Aquincumban (Tóth Endre társsz.), Arch. Ért. 97, 109–115.
- 1981 Az onogurok és onogundurok a Kárpát-medencében, SzMMÉ
- 1982 Das nordwestliche Transdanubien im 9. Jahrhundert und die "Uungariorum marcha", Savaria 15
- 1983 Veneter – Urnenfelderkultur – Bernsteinstrasse, Savaria 16
- 1983 A gyepű szerepe az etnikai és politikai átalakulásokban, in: Tőkei Ferenc (szerk.) : Nomád társadalmak és államalakulatok (Körösi Csorna kiskönyvtár 18). Budapest 1983, 215–236.
- 1986 A Karoling birodalom „délkeleti” határvédelme kérdéséhez, KEMMK 2
- 1986 A dák királyság (Mócsy András társsz.), in: Makkai László - Mócsy András (szerk.): Erdély története I. A kezdetektől 1606-ig. Akadémiai Kiadó Budapest, 32–46.
- 1987 Spätvölkerwanderungszeitliche Kerbinschriften im Karpatenbecken
- 1988 Késő népvándorláskori és Árpád-kori települések Tatabánya-Dózsakertben, in: Gombkötő G. (Főszerk.):Komárom megye története I.
- 1989 Dákok, rómaiak, románok. Akadémiai Kiadó, Budapest.
- 1997 Protobolgárok a Kárpát-medencében, KEMMK 5
- 1999 Komárom-Esztergom megye a honfoglalás korában, Tudományos Füzetek 11
- 2000 „A Dunántúl középső bronzkora és kapcsolatai”, KEMMK 7
- 2000 A koszideri korszak a Dunántúlon, KEMMK 7
- 2000 A Bodrog-alsóbűi felirat, SMK 14
- 2002/2005 Magyar őstörténet - Magyar honfoglalás
- 2004 A székely írás emlékei, kapcsolatai, története
- 2007 A rézkortól a hunokig
