= Komárom =

City in Komárom-Esztergom county, Hungary

- Town
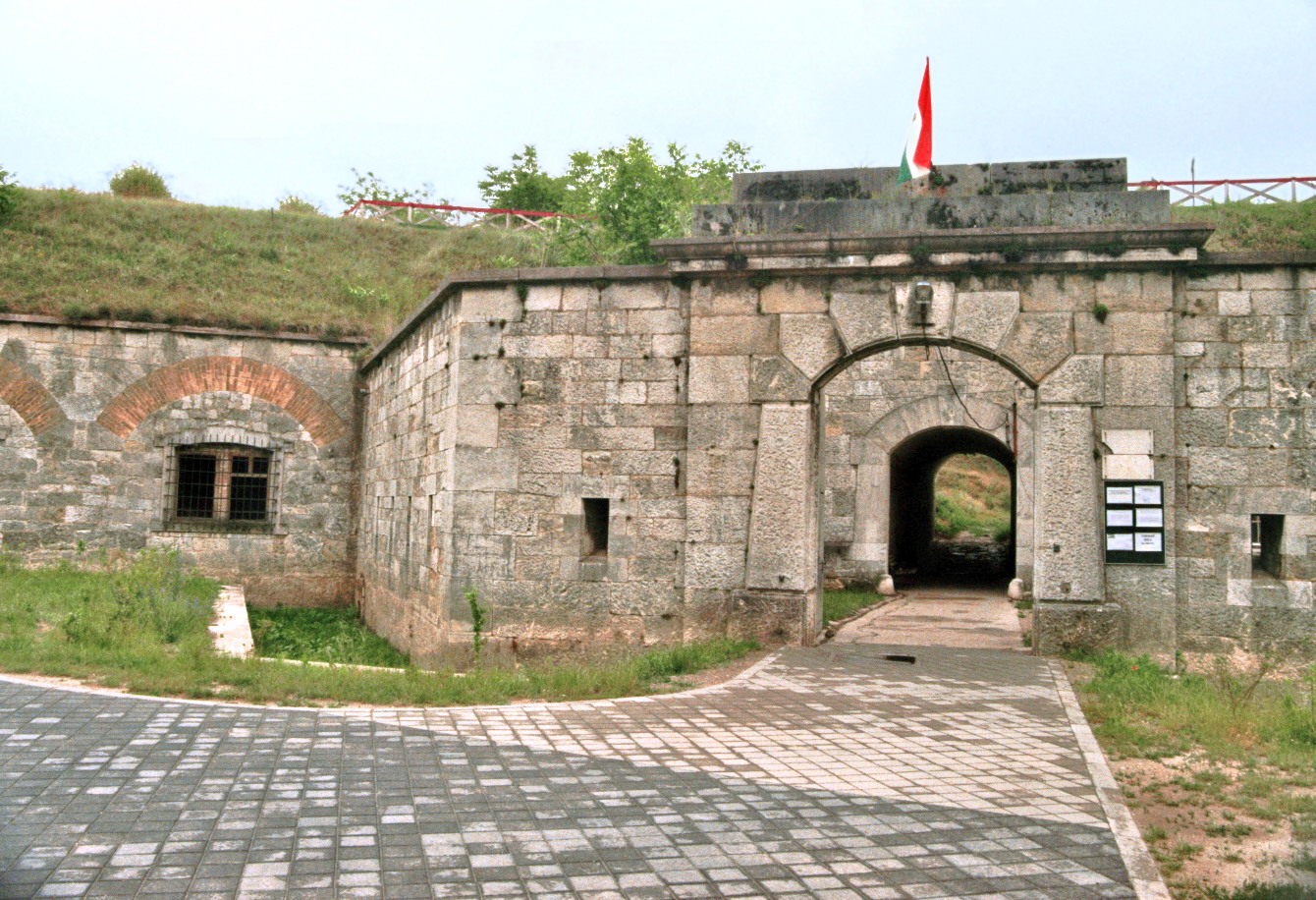
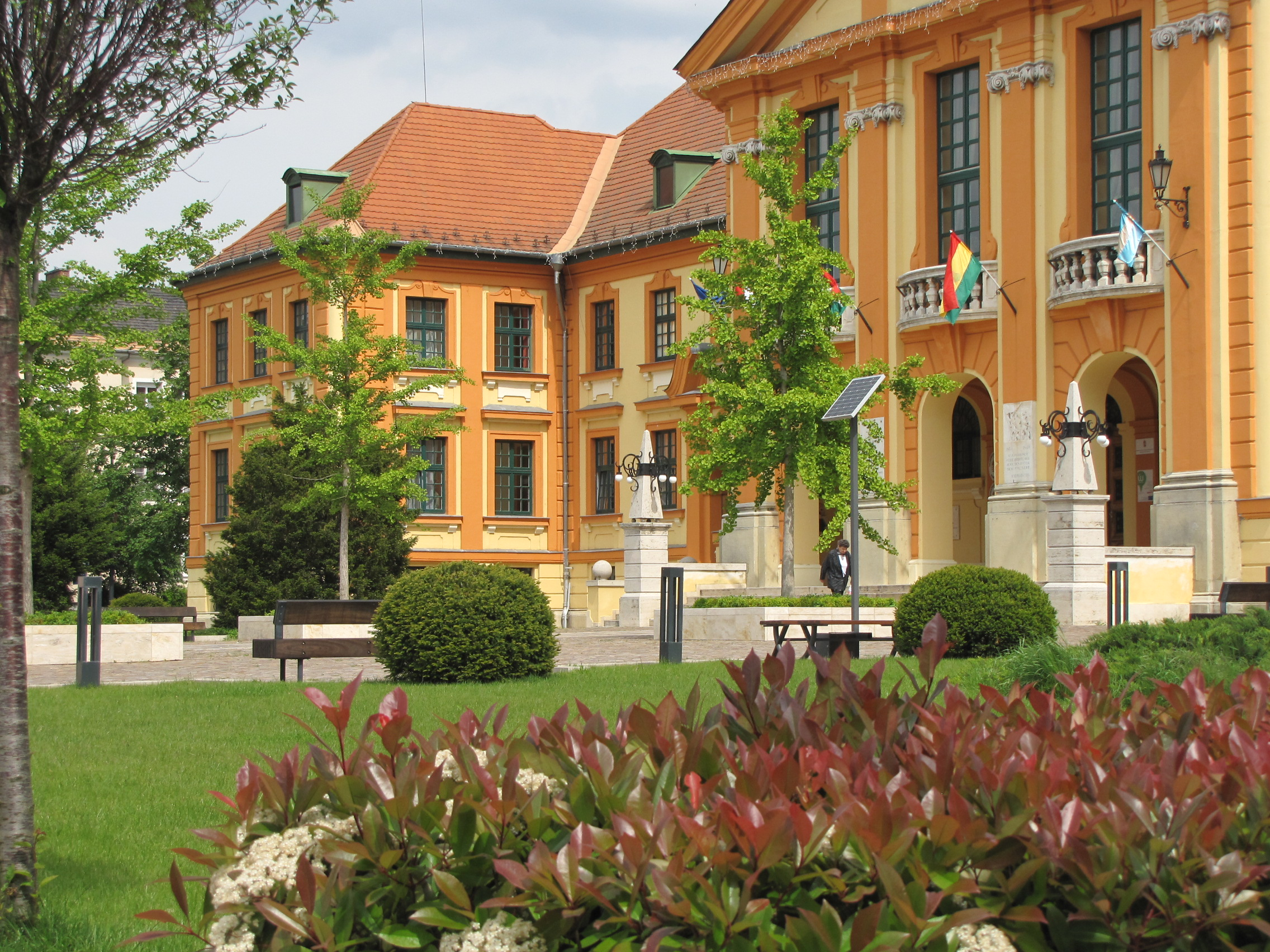
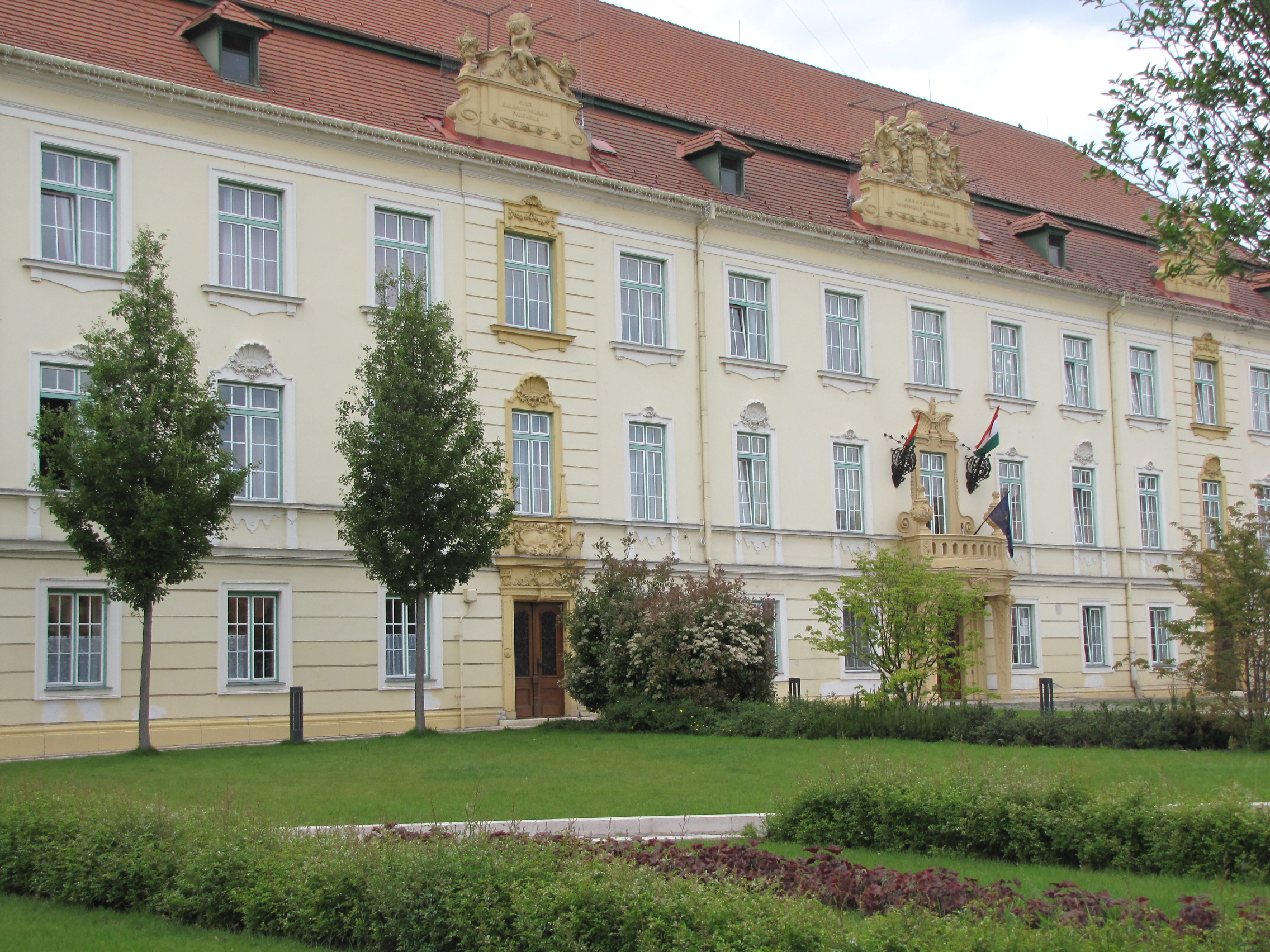

- Flag Coat of arms

- Location of Komárom in Hungary
- Coordinates: 47°44′25″N 18°7′28″E
- Country: Hungary
- Region: Central Transdanubia
- County: Komárom-Esztergom
- Subregion: Komárom
- Rank: City

Area
  - Total: 70.19 km^{2} (27.10 sq mi)

Population (2017)
  - Total: 18,805
  - Density: 267.9/km^{2} (693.9/sq mi)
- Time zone: UTC+1 (CET)
  - Summer (DST): UTC+2 (CEST)
- Postal code: 2900
- Area code: +36 34
- KSH code: 05449
- Website: http://www.komarom.hu

Komárom (Hungarian pronunciation: [ˈkomaːrom]; German: Komorn; Latin: Brigetio, later Comaromium; Slovak: Komárno) is a city in Hungary on the south bank of the Danube in Komárom-Esztergom County. Komárom fortress played an important role in the Hungarian Revolution of 1848 and many contemporary English sources refer to it as the Fortress of Comorn.

Komárom on the south bank was formerly known as a separate village called Újszőny (or Szony). Komarom on the north bank and Újszőny were connected in 1892 with an iron bridge across the Danube. The two towns were united under the name of city of Komárom in 1896.

On 4 June 1920, the Treaty of Trianon that broke up the Austria-Hungary Empire split the city in two, because the southern border of Czechoslovakia was determined by the river Danube. This division separated the historical Komárom county of the Kingdom of Hungary and the city of Komárom.

The bigger, northern part of the city was attached to Czechoslovakia and renamed Komárno. Its population resulted in a sizable ethnic Hungarian minority in present-day Slovakia. The southern part of the city, lying south of the Danube, remained in Hungary.

On 2 November 1938 by the First Vienna Award, the northern part of the city was returned to Hungary, and divided Komárom was reunified. At the end of World War II, the city was again divided between Czechoslovakia and Hungary.

Following the breakup of Czechoslovakia, two nations were established: the Czech Republic to the north and Slovakia to the south. Komárno is in today's Slovakia on the northern bank of the Danube.

== History ==
Following the Hungarian conquest of the Carpathian Basin at the turn of the 9th and 10th centuries, Prince Árpád gave Komárom and the Komárom county vicinity to tribal chieftain Ketel. Ketel was the first known ancestor of the famous Koppán (genus) clan. At the beginning of the 12th century, this tribe founded the town's Benedictine Monastery in honor of the Blessed Virgin, mentioned in 1222 by the name of Monostorium de Koppán. The Turks destroyed much of the monastery and its surroundings in 1529, and the area was depopulated. Later, it was referred to as the Pioneer Monastery (Pusztamonostor) in documented sources.

In the 21st century, it is called Koppánymonostor (Koppán's Monastery) in honor of its founding family. Roman ruins (including a stone mile marker and watchtowers) still stand today.

The town was heavily damaged in the 1763 Komárom earthquake.

Between 1850 and 1871, the Fort Monostor (Monostori Erőd) was built nearby.

On 10 January 1919, the Czechoslovak army occupied the northern part of the city. On 30 April Hungarian forces unsuccessfully attempted to recapture that part of the city. Following the Great War (World War I), on 4 June 1920 Hungary was forced to sign the Treaty of Trianon recognizing new imposed borders in the breakup of the Austria-Hungary Empire. These include the border with Czechoslovakia.

The loss of Upper-Hungary resulted in a sizable Hungarian minority in Slovakia. The Treaty of Trianon split the city in two, as the state of Czechoslovakia was based on a border formed by the river Danube. It divided the historical Komárom county on the south side from the city of Komárom on the north of the river. The northern part of the city, which was the bigger part of the city, became part of Czechoslovakia, which renamed the town on the northern shore as Komárno. After the Czechoslovak administration was set up, the ethnic composition of Komárno partially expanded, but Hungarians still outnumbered the Slovak population. During the years of the First Czechoslovak Republic, Komárno became the cultural and social centre of the Hungarians in Czechoslovakia. The southern part of the city in Hungary, called Komárom-Újváros, was for a few years the seat of the truncated Komárom County.

During the interwar period, it was possible to travel between Komárom and Komárno with a passport; the only restriction was that the bridge was closed at 23:00, and people had to return home by then. On 2 November 1938 by the First Vienna Award, Komárno was returned to Hungary. Komárom was reunified and became a county town once again. Regent of Kingdom of Hungary, Miklós Horthy, received a tumultuous welcome from the citizens as he crossed the old bridge and entered the formerly dismembered part. During World War II, the city was bombarded many times. At the end of war, new treaties divided the city again between Hungary and Czechoslovakia.

After World War II, the occupying Soviets built the country's biggest ammunition storage in the Fortress of Monostor. Thousands of wagons of ammunition were forwarded from this strictly guarded area. One of a series of forts, the Monostor is today open to the public as a museum.

Komárom and Komárno are connected by three bridges: The older Elizabeth bridge, built in 1892, a railway bridge, and the newer Monostori Bridge, completed in 2020. The majority of its funding came from the European Union's Connecting Europe Facility.

The two towns used to be a border crossing between Czechoslovakia (today Slovakia) and Hungary, until both countries became part of the Schengen Area. All immigration and customs checks were lifted on 12 December 2007.

Significant minority groups
Nationality	Population (2011)
Germany	163
Slovakia	125
Romania	30
Ukraine	25
Poland	12

== Notable people ==
- Franz Heckenast (1889–1939), Austrian artillery officer and opponent of Nazism
- Jovan Monasterlija (d. 1706), Serb vice-voivode and Habsburg imperial officer
- Julie Kopacsy-Karczag (1867–1957), operatic soprano
- Cardinal Leopold Karl von Kollonitsch (1631–1707), Catholic prelate
- Franz Lehár (1870–1948), Austro-Hungarian composer
- Theodor Körner, Austrian President
- Mór Jókai (1825–1904), writer
- Hans Selye (1907–1982), Hungarian-Austrian-Canadian endocrinologist
- Tünde Szabó (1945–2021), Hungarian actress
- Péter Szijjártó (born 1978), Hungarian Minister of Foreign Affairs and Trade
- Endre Komaromi-katz, painter

== Twin towns – sister cities ==
Komárom is twinned with:

- Gratwein-Straßengel, Austria
- Khust, Ukraine
- Komárno, Slovakia
- Lieto, Finland
- Naumburg, Germany
- Sebeș, Romania
- Sosnowiec, Poland

== See also ==
- Komárno
- Komárom county
- Fort Monostor
