= Church of the Dormition of the Theotokos, Komárno =

Church of the Dormition of the Theotokos
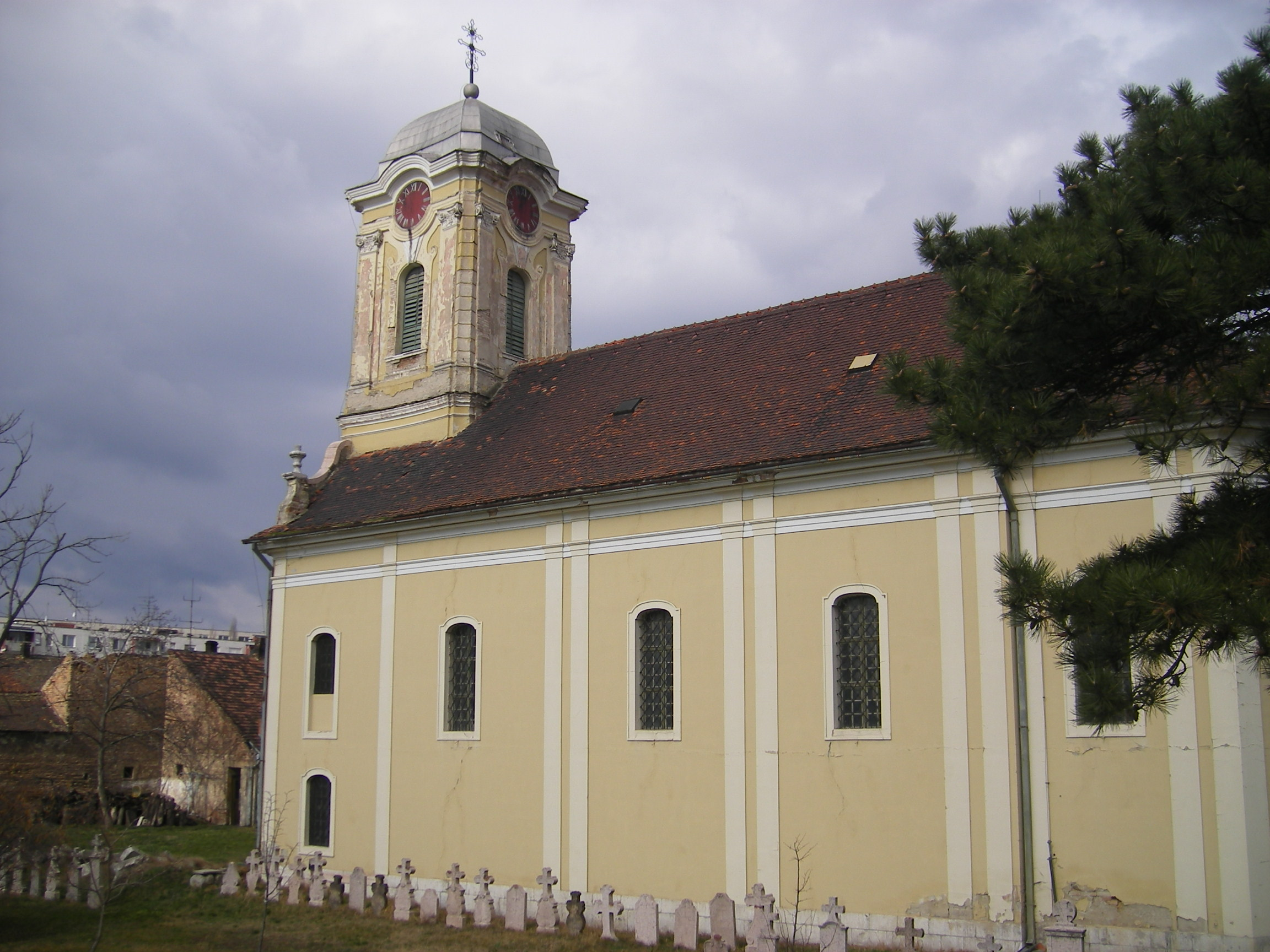
- Church of the Dormition of the Theotokos
- Church of the Dormition of the Theotokos
- 47°45′29″N 18°07′24″E
- Location: Komárno
- Country: Slovakia
- Denomination: Orthodox Church of the Czech Lands and Slovakia

History
- Dedication: Dormition of the Theotokos

Architecture
- Style: Baroque

Church of the Dormition of the Theotokos (Slovak: Chrám Zosnutia presvätej Bohorodičky, Serbian: Црква успења Пресвете Богородице) is an Eastern Orthodox church in Komárno in Slovakia. The church is dedicated to the Dormition of the Theotokos. Following the establishment of the Communist rule in Czechoslovakia the jurisdiction over the church was transferred from the Eparchy of Buda of the Serbian Orthodox Church to the Orthodox Church of the Czech Lands and Slovakia which since then administers the site while ″maintaining a fraternal relation with the Serbian Orthodox Church″.

The current church building dates back to the 18th century when it was completed in 1770, but an earlier Serbian Orthodox church existed at the same spot from 1511. Church records were kept from the first half of the 18th century. The church has been in its current form since 1851 when the previously burned tower was renovated. In 1905, it was reported to be in very good condition both externally and internally, but it didn't have a permanent priest. After the First World War, the Serbian community in the town was reduced to only a few individuals, so the church remained unused for several decades. In recent years, the church has been renovated, and religious services are regularly held on Sundays and holidays.

In 2019, Archbishop of Prešov, Metropolitan of the Czech Lands and Slovakia Rastislav invited Serbian Orthodox Bishop of Buda from Szentendre, Hungary to organize joint Divine Liturgy in the building. According to Serbian custom, a blessing and breaking of the Slava cake were held after the Liturgy testifying to the preservation of this tradition despite the fact that the majority of contemporary believers are not of Serbian origin.

== See also ==
- Serbs in Slovakia
- Eparchy of Buda
- Cathedral of the Dormition of the Theotokos, Szentendre
