= Modrany =

Modrany Madar
- Municipality
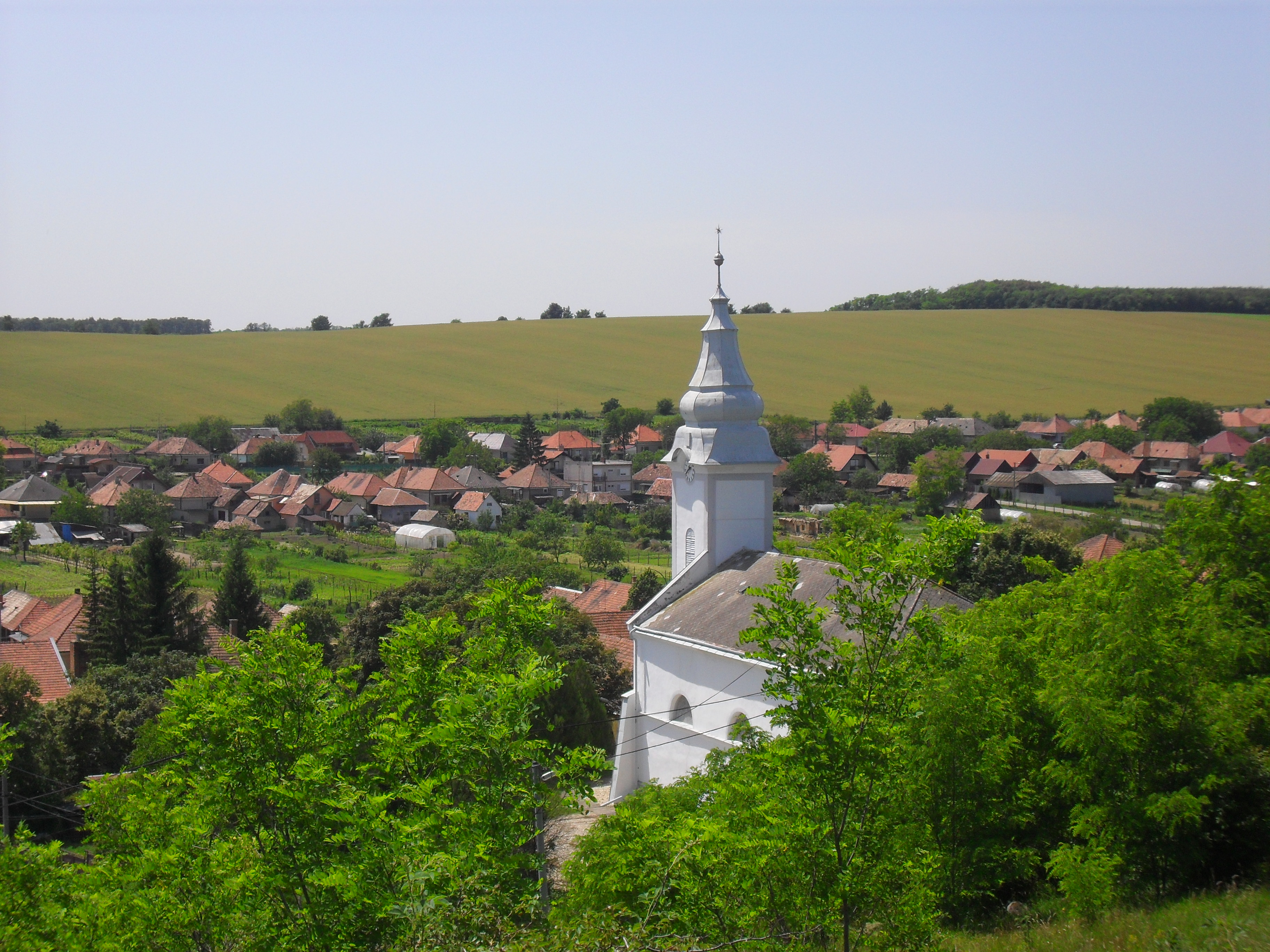
- Reformed church in the village

- Flag Coat of arms

- Location of Modrany in the Nitra Region Location of Modrany in Slovakia
- Coordinates: 47.82°N 18.35°E
- Country: Slovakia
- Region: Nitra Region
- District: Komárno District
- First mentioned: 1205

Area
  - Total: 27.06 km^{2} (10.45 sq mi)
- Elevation: 128 m (420 ft)

Population (2025)
  - Total: 1,279
- Time zone: UTC+1 (CET)
  - Summer (DST): UTC+2 (CEST)
- Postal code: 946 33
- Area code: +421 35
- Vehicle registration plate (until 2022): KN
- Website: www.obecmodrany.sk

Modrany (Hungarian: Madar, Hungarian pronunciation:[ˈmɒdɒr]) is a village and municipality in the Komárno District in the Nitra Region of south-west Slovakia.

== Geography ==
The municipality lies at an altitude of 128 metres (420 ft) and covers an area of 27.06 km^{2} (10.45 sq mi) (2025). The village lies in the center of a small valley centered on a small brook that runs through the village. One hill of the valley is covered by a sunflower field. Over the other is the further section of the village, with the village vineyards.

== History ==
In the 9th century, the territory of Modrany became part of the Kingdom of Hungary. In historical records the village was first mentioned in 1205. After the Austro-Hungarian army disintegrated in November 1918, Czechoslovak troops occupied the area, later acknowledged internationally by the Treaty of Trianon. Between 1938 and 1945 Modrany once more became part of Miklós Horthy's Hungary through the First Vienna Award. From 1945 until the Velvet Divorce, it was part of Czechoslovakia. Since then it has been part of Slovakia.

In 1946, after the Beneš decrees, hundreds of civilians of German descent were forced into goods wagons and deported to Germany.

The Soviet Army had a base located on the outskirts of town, which they abandoned around 1989. A hill near the village was used for target practice for tanks. The base has since been broken apart and sold for scrap; some ruins have remained.

== Population ==
Population statistic (10 years)
Year	1995	2005	2015	2025
Count	1393	1471	1399	1279
Difference		+5.59%	−4.89%	−8.57%

Population statistic
Year	2024	2025
Count	1280	1279
Difference		−0.07%

It has a population of 1279 people (31 December 2025).

=== Ethnicity ===
Census 2021 (1+ %)
Ethnicity	Number	Fraction
Hungarian	1110	84.41%
Slovak	175	13.3%
Not found out	100	7.6%
Total	1315	

In year 2021 was 1315 people by ethnicity 1110 as Hungarian, 175 as Slovak, 100 as Not found out, 7 as Czech, 7 as Romani, 1 as Jewish and 1 as Moravian.

Note on population: The difference values of population numbers in the table "Population statistic" and in the sections "Ethnicity" & "Religion" is caused by the use of various statistical methods.

=== Religion ===
Census 2021 (1+ %)
Religion	Number	Fraction
Calvinist Church	721	54.83%
Roman Catholic Church	316	24.03%
None	155	11.79%
Not found out	80	6.08%
Evangelical Church	25	1.9%
Total	1315	

In year 2021 was 1315 people by religion 721 from Calvinist Church, 316 from Roman Catholic Church, 155 from None, 80 from Not found out, 25 from Evangelical Church, 8 from Greek Catholic Church, 4 from Jehovah's Witnesses, 2 from Old Catholic Church, 1 from Other and not ascertained christian church, 1 from United Methodist Church, 1 from Church of Jesus Christ of Latter-day Saints and 1 from Baptists Church.

== Facilities ==
The village has a public library, and a football pitch. There are also two churches, Catholic and Calvinist and a new municipal office. There is a pre-school and primary school (K-9). High school students attend a split Hungarian/Slovak school in Komárno. Buses run from the village to Komárno frequently.

== Twin towns – sister cities ==
Modrany is twinned with:

- Acățari, Romania
- Isztimér, Hungary
- Kocs, Hungary
- Sükösd, Hungary
