= Alsószentmihály inscription =

Historical inscription

The Alsószentmihály inscription is an inscription on a building stone in Mihai Viteazu, Cluj (Transylvania, today Romania). The origins and translation of the inscription are uncertain.

== The relic ==
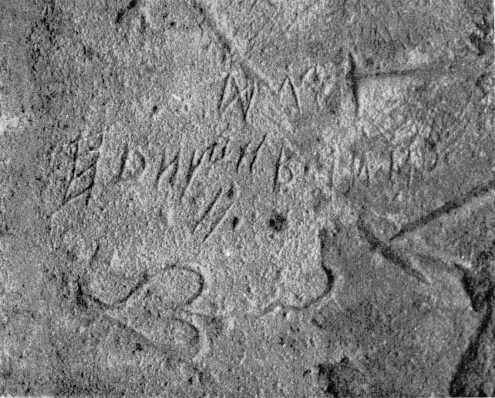
The photo of the Alsószentmihály inscription

The stone was an ancient Roman building stone—proved by the leaf-symbol, a frequently applied ornamental element of ancient Roman inscriptions—reused in the 10th century. Alsószentmihály located on the territory of the late Province Dacia existed up to the middle of the 3rd century. Dénes showed that the Kabars (Khazar rebels who joined the Hungarians in the 9th century) probably settled in this region (that time Transylvania). In some parts of Hungary, there are data of the Kabars even from the 13th century.

== Script used for the Alsószentmihály inscription ==
Some quotations from historian Gábor Vékony about the identification of the script in this inscription:

- "Since the Alsószentmihály inscription was not found in the geographical area of the Old Hungarian script, and in the first line, only vowels could be read based on the Khazarian script, we can state surely that the possible transcription of the inscription is surely out of the Khazarian script".
- "To summarize, we can state that the Alsószentmihály inscription is the relic of the Kabars settled into Transylvania, which is naturally written in Khazar with Khazarian script."
- "Similar symbols occur in other Khazarian runic inscriptions as well."
- "In Transylvania, the inscription of the reused stone built into the wall of the church of Alsószentmihály is unambiguously written with Khazarian runic alphabet."

Based on the quotations above, it can be stated that Vékony identified the script of the Alsószentmihály relic as a Khazarian script. According to Vékony, another relic, the Homokmégy-Halom inscription contains Khazarian text as well.

== The meaning of the inscription ==
The Alsószentmihály inscription was deciphered by archaeologist Gábor Vékony.

The transcription of Vékony (it uses IPA symbols):

	First Row	Second Row
Inscription	Alsoszentmihaly Khazarian Rovas inscription row 1	Alsoszentmihaly Khazarian Rovas inscription row 2
Transcription (using IPA)	^{ɛ}bi ^{a}tl^{ï}ɣ	jyedi • kyr qer^{e}j^{i}
Translation from Old Turkic	His mansion is famous.	Jüedi Kür Karaite. or Jüedi Kür (the) Karaite.

According to Vékony, the inscription was made by a Kabar leader, whose religion was Karaite. The first symbol of the first row is a ligature, its transcription: ^{a}tl^{ï}ɣ. The first symbol (from left) in the second row is a Khazarian word separator.

In the inscription, the third symbol of the first row (from left), and the symbols in the second and last place can be considered as descendants of the Old Turkic script. Nevertheless, their relation needs more evidence.

== Critics, alternative theories ==
There are several critics of Vékony's theories and translations, most notably the Hungarian linguist and historian, András Róna-Tas. The debates were summarized by István Riba in 1999 and 2000.
