= Alaptolma =

Alaptolma (or Tolma) is a legendary Magyar tribal chieftain who lived in the first part of the 10th century.

According to the medieval Gesta Hungarorum, Alaptolma, son of Ketel, built a castle on the estate of his father, at the confluence of the Danube and Váh (Hungarian: Vág) rivers. This ancient castle became the core of the town of Komárom. Today Ketel and Alaptolma are honoured as the legendary founders of the city.
