= Vladimír Matejička =

Slovak politician (1956–2025)

Member of the National Council
- In office 4 July 2006 – 20 March 2020

Personal details
- Born: 14 January 1956 Komárno, Czechoslovakia
- Died: 13 December 2025 (aged 69)
- Party: Direction – Social Democracy
- Children: 2, including Zuzana Matejičková

Vladimír Matejička (14 January 1956 – 13 December 2025) was a Slovak politician. From 2006 to 2020, he served as a member of the National Council of Slovakia.

== Early life and career ==
Vladimír Matejička was born on 14 January 1956 in Komárno.

Matejička was a member of the Direction – Social Democracy party. He served as a Member of the National Council for 14 years, between 2006 and 2020. In late 2017, he was among a group of five Direction MPs who publicly expressed discontent over their salaries, which had remained frozen for several years, arguing for an increase.

== Personal life and death ==
Vladimír Matejička had two daughters: Zuzana and Jana. Zuzana followed her father into politics, being elected as a Member of Parliament for SMER - SD in 2023. Matejička's relationship with his daughter Jana drew public attention in 2013 due to a publicized family conflict.

Matejička died on 13 December 2025, at the age of 69.
