= Svätý Peter =

Svätý Peter Szentpéter
- Municipality
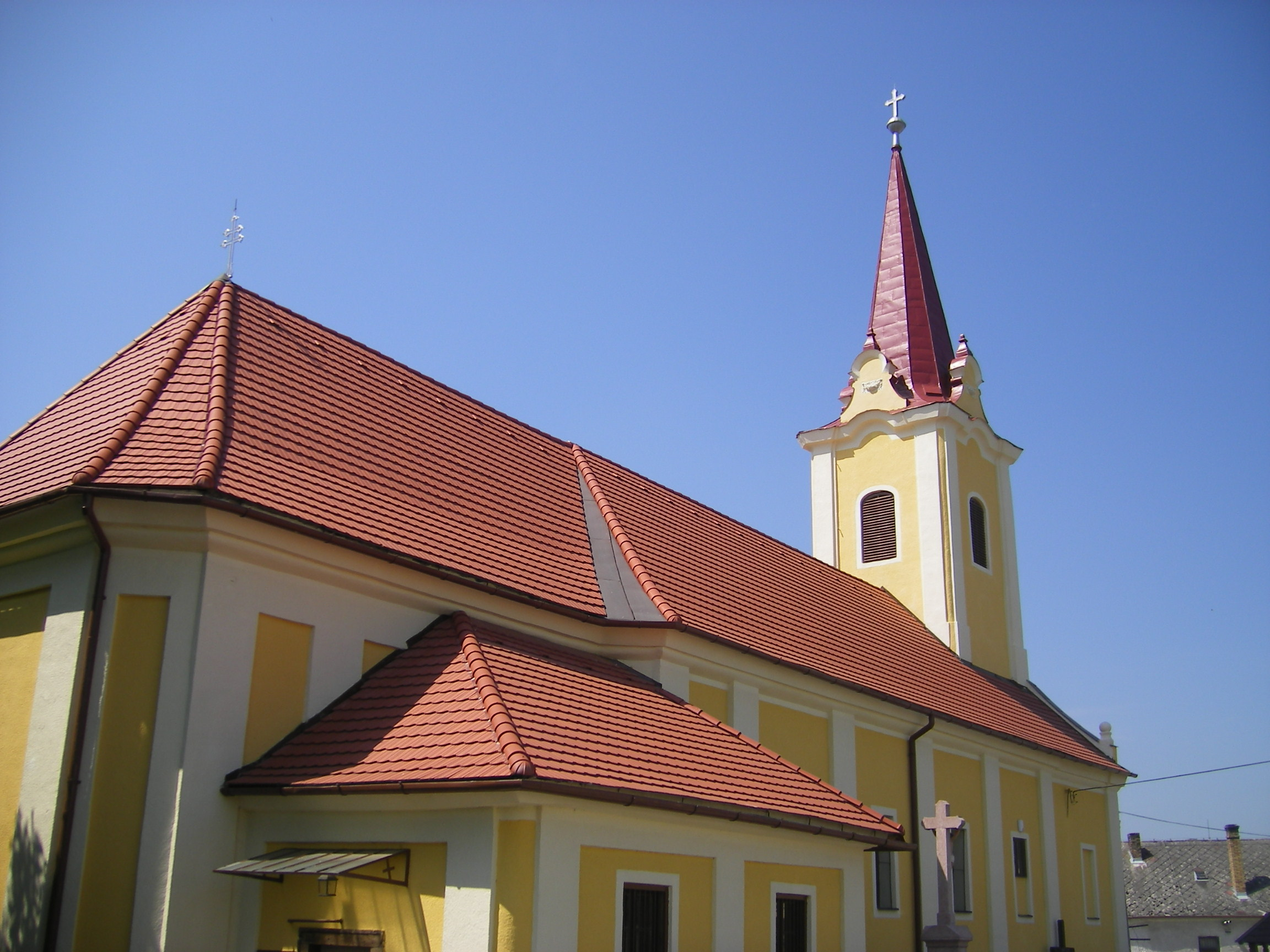
- Church of Saint Martin

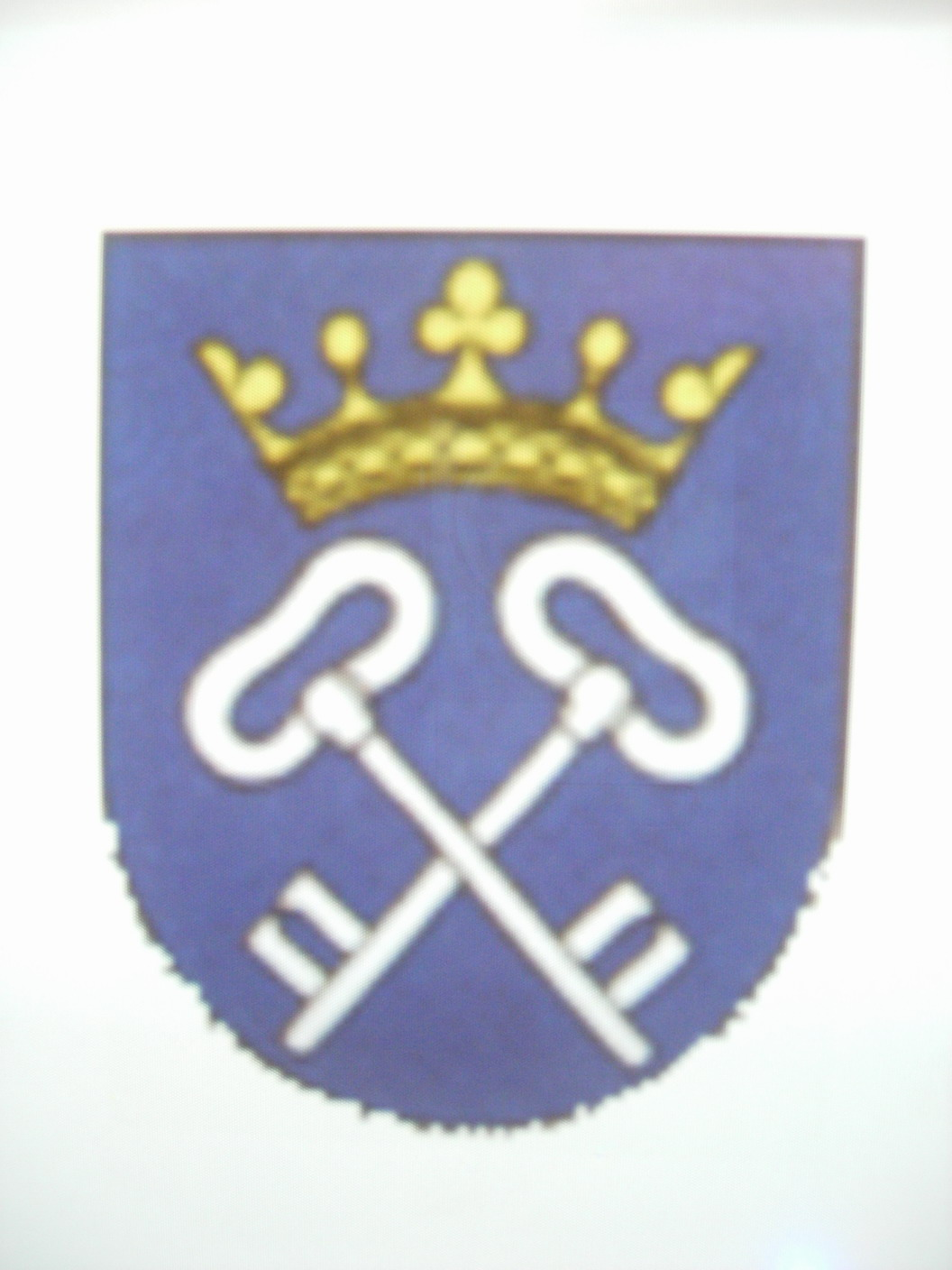
- Flag Coat of arms

- Location of Svätý Peter in the Nitra Region Location of Svätý Peter in Slovakia
- Coordinates: 47.85°N 18.26°E
- Country: Slovakia
- Region: Nitra Region
- District: Komárno District
- First mentioned: 1332

Government
  - Mayor: József Jobbágy (MOST-HÍD)

Area
  - Total: 34.32 km^{2} (13.25 sq mi)
- Elevation: 138 m (453 ft)

Population (2025)
  - Total: 2,693
- Time zone: UTC+1 (CET)
  - Summer (DST): UTC+2 (CEST)
- Postal code: 946 57
- Area code: +421 35
- Vehicle registration plate (until 2022): KN
- Website: www.svatypeter.eu

Svätý Peter (Hungarian: Szentpéter or Komáromszentpéter) is a village and municipality in the Komárno District in the Nitra Region of southwest Slovakia.

== Geography ==
The municipality lies at an altitude of 138 metres (453 ft) and covers an area of 34.32 km^{2} (13.25 sq mi) (2025).

== History ==
In the 9th century, the territory of Svätý Peter became part of the Kingdom of Hungary. In historical records the village was first mentioned in 1332. After the Austro-Hungarian army disintegrated in November 1918, Czechoslovak troops occupied the area, later acknowledged internationally by the Treaty of Trianon. Between 1938 and 1945 Svätý Peter once more became part of Miklós Horthy's Hungary through the First Vienna Award. From 1945 until the Velvet Divorce, it was part of Czechoslovakia. Since then it has been part of Slovakia.

== Population ==
Population statistic (10 years)
Year	1995	2005	2015	2025
Count	2647	2613	2740	2693
Difference		−1.28%	+4.86%	−1.71%

Population statistic
Year	2024	2025
Count	2700	2693
Difference		−0.25%

It has a population of 2693 people (31 December 2025).

=== Ethnicity ===
Census 2021 (1+ %)
Ethnicity	Number	Fraction
Hungarian	1848	67.56%
Slovak	858	31.37%
Not found out	171	6.25%
Total	2735	

In year 2021 was 2735 people by ethnicity 1848 as Hungarian, 858 as Slovak, 171 as Not found out, 13 as Romani, 5 as Czech, 3 as Other, 2 as Russian, 2 as Romanian, 1 as Moravian and 1 as Bulgarian.

Note on population: The difference values of population numbers in the table "Population statistic" and in the sections "Ethnicity" & "Religion" is caused by the use of various statistical methods.

=== Religion ===
Census 2021 (1+ %)
Religion	Number	Fraction
Roman Catholic Church	1771	64.75%
None	333	12.18%
Calvinist Church	264	9.65%
Not found out	138	5.05%
Evangelical Church	130	4.75%
Total	2735	

In year 2021 was 2735 people by religion 1771 from Roman Catholic Church, 333 from None, 264 from Calvinist Church, 138 from Not found out, 130 from Evangelical Church, 27 from Baptists Church, 26 from Greek Catholic Church, 11 from Christian Congregations in Slovakia, 11 from Apostolic Church, 9 from Jehovah's Witnesses, 6 from Other and not ascertained christian church, 4 from Old Catholic Church, 2 from Eastern Orthodox Church, 2 from United Methodist Church and 1 from Other.

== Facilities ==
The village has a public library, a gym and a football pitch.
