= Ketel =

Ketel is a legendary Magyar tribal chieftain of perhaps Kabar origin, who lived at the end of the 9th century. He was the father of Alaptolma, and the first known ancestor of the Koppán clan.

According to the medieval Gesta Hungarorum, the leader of the Magyars, Árpád, donated a large estate to Ketel along the Danube and Váh (Vág) rivers where he settled with his people. Today, Ketel is honoured as the legendary founder of the city of Komárom with his son, Alaptolma.
