= Celestyn =

Celestyn is a given name. Notable people with the name include:

- Celestyn Chołodecki (1816–1867), Polish member of the szlachta (noble) family of Chołodecki
- Celestyn Czaplic (1723–1804), Polish–Lithuanian szlachcic, politician, writer and a poet
- Krzysztof Celestyn Mrongovius (1764–1855), Protestant pastor, writer, philosopher, linguist and translator
- Celestyn Myślenta (1588–1653), Polish Lutheran theologian and rector of the University of Königsberg

== See also ==
- Celestin (disambiguation)
- Celestina (disambiguation)
- Celestine (disambiguation)
- Celestini, surname page
- Celestino, surname page
