= Celestin =

Celestin may refer to:

- Celestin (given name), a masculine given name
- Celestin (surname), a surname

== See also ==
- Celestina (disambiguation)
- Celestine (disambiguation)
- Celestino, a surname and given name
- Saint-Célestin (disambiguation)
