= Dočkal =

Dočkal (feminine: Dočkalová) is a Czech surname, which means '[he] has lived to see', '[he] waited for'. Notable people with the surname include:

- Bořek Dočkal (born 1988), Czech footballer
- Jaroslav Dočkal (1939–2021), Czech football manager and player
- Kamilo Dočkal (1879–1963), Croatian historian, cultural worker and violinist
- Martina Zvěřinová, née Dočkalová (born 1983), Czech orienteer
- Tereza Dočkalová (born 1988), Czech film and stage actress

== See also ==
- Dočekal
