= Celestin (given name) =

Celestin is a masculine given name. Notable people with the name include:

- Célestin Freinet (1896–1966), French pedagogue and educational reformer
- Célestin Montcocol (1879–1981), French businessman
- Adolphe Célestin Pégoud (1889–1915), French aviator and first fighter ace in history
- Celestin Tomić (1917–2006), Croatian Franciscan
- Edward Celestin Daly (1894–1964), American prelate
- Friedrich Johannes Jacob Celestin von Schwarzenberg (1809–1885), Austrian cardinal
- Mato Celestin Medović (1857–1920), Croatian painter
