= Nazzareno =

Nazzareno is a given name. Notable people with the given name include:

- Nazzareno Belfasti (born 1993), Italian footballer
- Nazzareno Berto (born 1957), Italian racing cyclist
- Nazzareno Camilleri (1906–1973), Maltese philosopher, theologian, and mystic
- Nazzareno Canuti (born 1956), Italian footballer
- Nazzareno Carusi (born 1968), Italian pianist
- Nazzareno Celestini (1914–2001), Italian footballer
- Nazzareno Cipriani (1843–1925), Italian painter and watercolorist
- Nazzareno De Angelis (1881–1962), Italian operatic bass
- Nazzareno Di Marco (born 1985), Italian discus thrower
- Nazzareno Formosa (1901–1937), American-Maltese Roman Catholic priest
- Nazzareno Mandolesi (born 1944), Italian astrophysicist and cosmologist
- Nazzareno Marconi (born 1958), Italian bishop
- Nazzareno Natale (1938–2006), Italian actor
- Nazzareno Orlandi (1861–1952), Italian-Argentine painter
- Nazzareno Salvatori (born 1959), Italian football coach
- Nazzareno Scattaglia (1887–1975), Italian general
- Nazzareno Simonato (1936–2023), Italian rower
- Nazzareno Tarantino (born 1979), Italian football coach and former forward
- Nazzareno Zamperla (1937–2020), Italian actor and stuntman
