= Celestini =

Celestini is an Italian surname. Notable people with the surname include:

- Andrea Celestini (1773–1830s), Italian painter
- Costanzo Celestini (born 1961), Italian footballer
- Fabio Celestini (born 1975), Swiss footballer and manager
- Federico Celestini (born 1964), Italian musicologist
- Nazzareno Celestini (1914–?), Italian footballer
