= Croatia–Czech Republic relations =

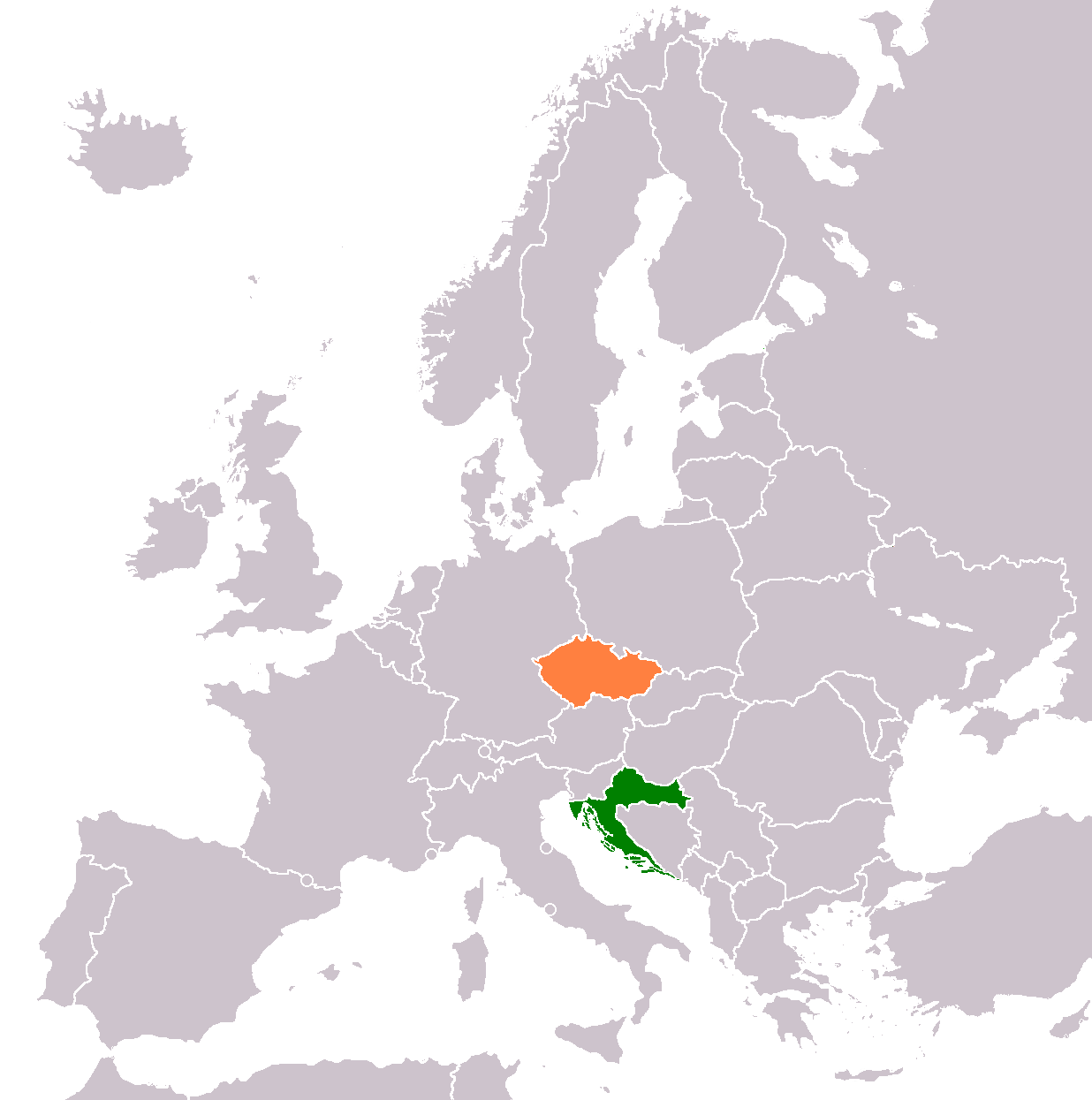

- Croatia: Czech Republic

Croatia–Czech Republic relations are foreign relations between Croatia and the Czech Republic. Croatia has an embassy in Prague. The Czech Republic has an embassy in Zagreb.

Both countries are full members of the Council of Europe, the European Union and NATO.

== History ==
Territories of both countries used to be part of Austria-Hungary until the end of WWI; later on, both countries were part of socialist federations.

Czechoslovakia recognized Croatia on 16 January 1992. After the dissolution of Czechoslovakia, Croatia and the newly established Czech Republic mutually recognized and established diplomatic relations on 1 January 1993.

== Culture ==
The Croatian and Czech languages both belong to the Slavic language family allowing a small degree of mutual intelligibility. There is a Czech ethnic minority in Croatia. Croatia is a popular tourist destination among Czechs.

== European Union and NATO ==
Croatia joined the EU in 2013. the Czech Republic joined the EU in 2004. Croatia joined NATO in 2009. the Czech Republic joined NATO in 1999.

== Resident diplomatic missions ==
- Croatia has an embassy in Prague.
- the Czech Republic has an embassy in Zagreb.
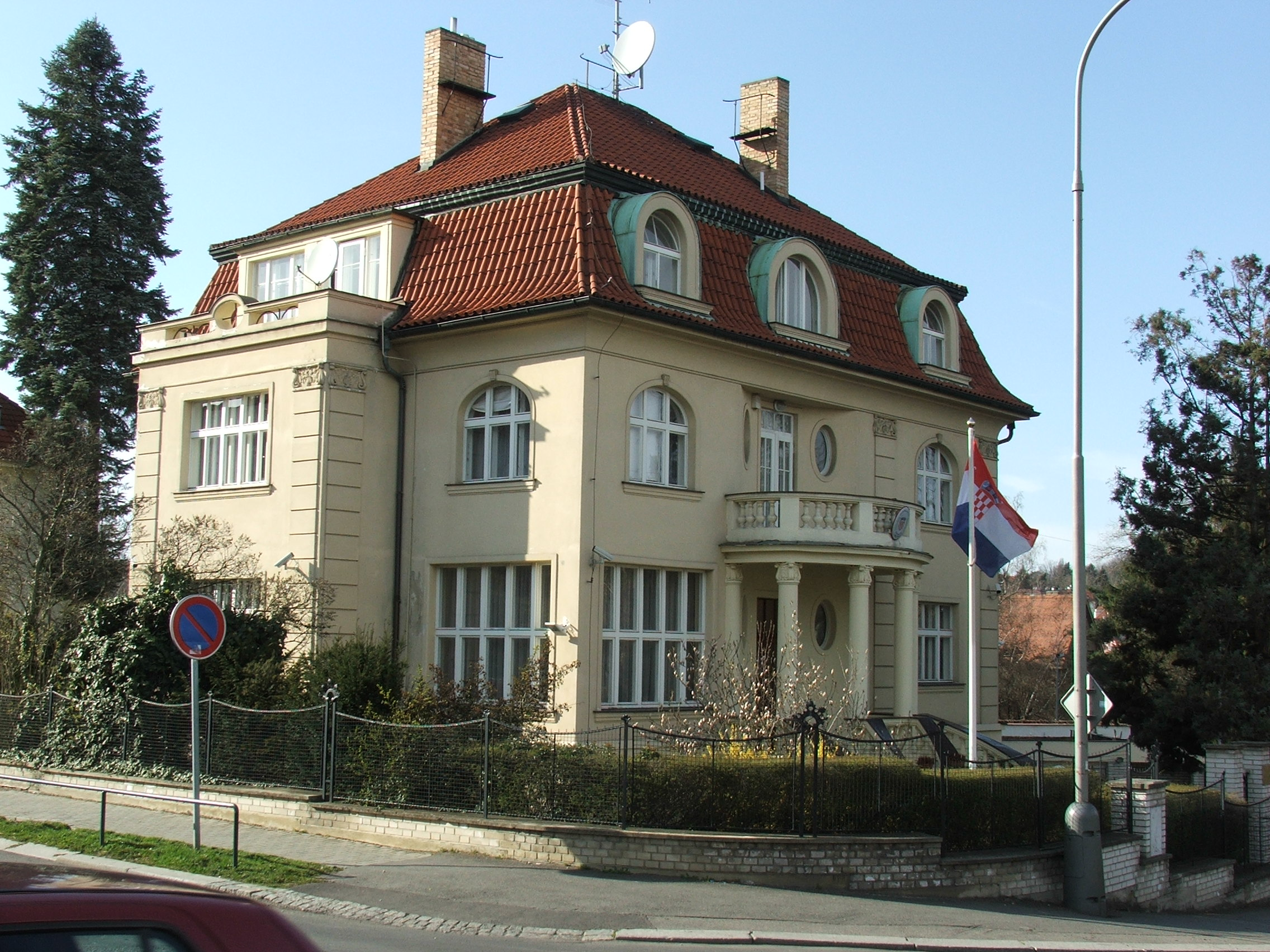
Embassy of Croatia in Prague

== See also ==
- Foreign relations of Croatia
- Foreign relations of the Czech Republic
- Czechoslovakia–Yugoslavia relations
- Croats in the Czech Republic
- Czechs of Croatia
