= Dobré Pole =

- Municipality
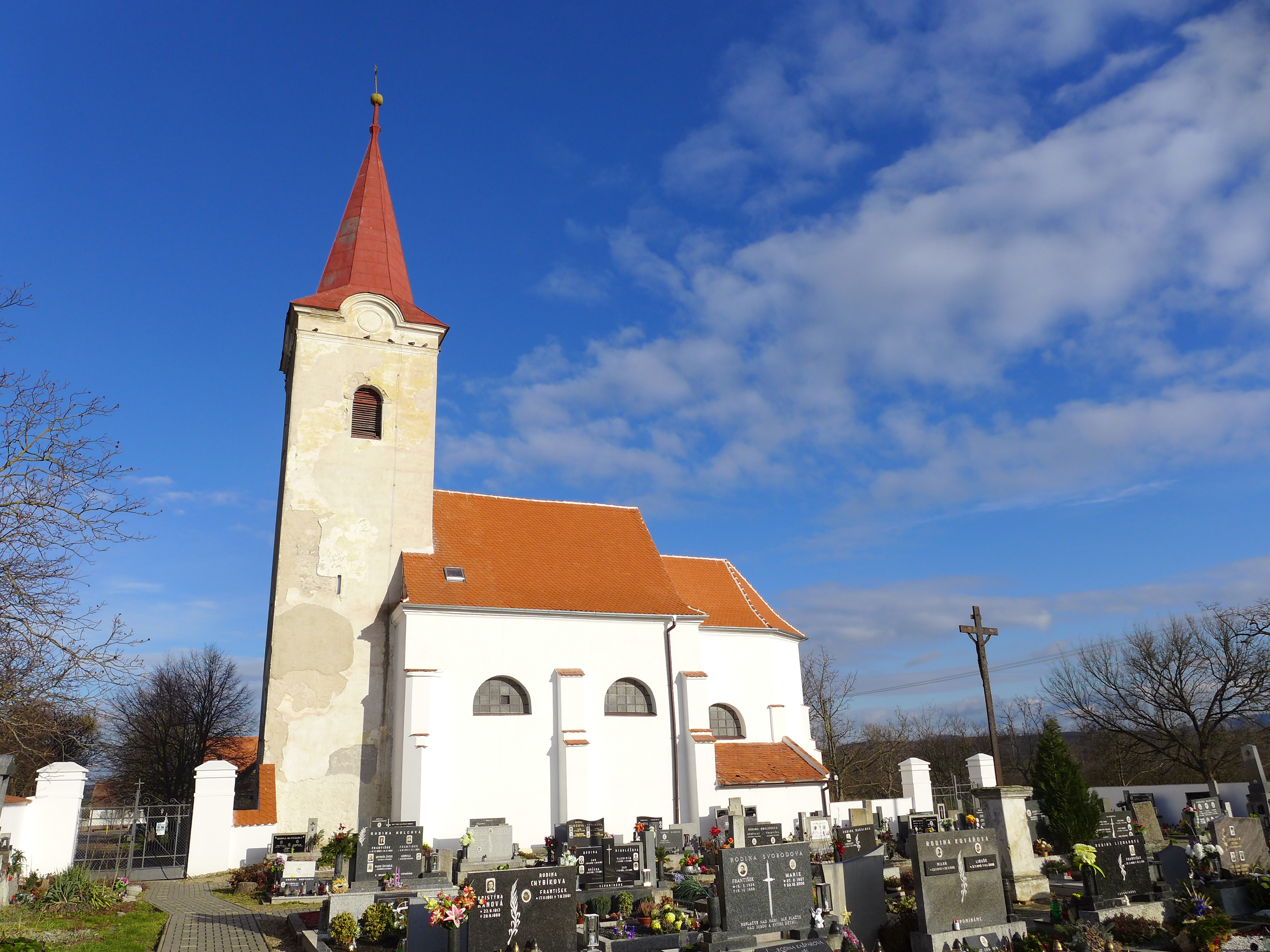
- Church of Saint Cecilia

- Flag Coat of arms

- Location in the Czech Republic
- Coordinates: 48°49′28″N 16°32′7″E
- Country: Czech Republic
- Region: South Moravian
- District: Břeclav
- First mentioned: 1350

Area
  - Total: 6.97 km^{2} (2.69 sq mi)
- Elevation: 186 m (610 ft)

Population (2026-01-01)
  - Total: 448
  - Density: 64.3/km^{2} (166/sq mi)
- Time zone: UTC+1 (CET)
  - Summer (DST): UTC+2 (CEST)
- Postal code: 691 81
- Website: www.dobrepole.cz

Dobré Pole (German: Guttenfeld; Croatian: Dobro Polje) is a municipality and village in Břeclav District in the South Moravian Region of the Czech Republic. It has about 400 inhabitants.

== Demographics ==
Dobré Pole is one of the three South Moravian municipalities with a historical population of Moravian Croats.

Historical population
Year	Pop.	±%
1869	635	—
1880	657	+3.5%
1890	678	+3.2%
1900	697	+2.8%
1910	700	+0.4%
1921	696	−0.6%
1930	699	+0.4%
1950	460	−34.2%
1961	423	−8.0%
1970	416	−1.7%
1980	426	+2.4%
1991	411	−3.5%
2001	409	−0.5%
2011	451	+10.3%
2021	452	+0.2%
Source: Censuses
