= Croats in the Czech Republic =

Croatian Czechs
- (Croatia) (Czech Republic)

Total population
- 2,400

Regions with significant populations
- Czech Republic: 2,400

Languages
- Czech, Croatian

Religion
- Roman Catholicism

Croats are one of the 14 recognized minorities in the Czech Republic.

According to the 2021 census, 2,400 Croats live in the Czech Republic, half of which stated their Croatian nationality in combination with another nationality. Out of that number, 800 are descendants of the Moravian Croats, who settled in Moravia in the 16th century. They have the right to use the Croatian language in communication with Czech authorities and government according to the Charter of Fundamental Rights and Basic Freedoms of the Czech Republic.

They live primarily in the South Moravian Region, in the municipalities of Jevišovka, Dobré Pole and Nový Přerov.

== History ==
The ancestors of the Croats in the Czech Republic arrived in the first half of the 16th century from central Croatia at the invitation of the House of Liechtenstein, fleeing before the Ottoman Turks. The period of their settling is at the same time as the arrival of the Croats to Austria, Hungary and Slovakia, who are called the Burgenland Croats. The migration of the Croats to Moravia got the attention of ethnographers, linguists, and historians in that era. The first mention of Croats was at the end of the 18th century. They tried to explain the reasons for the migration of the Croats from their ancestral homeland. They believed that the colonization of the Croats started from the Croatian regions south of the Kupa and Petrova Gora, better known as Banska Krajina (present-day Banovina), was summarized by Adolf Turek.

The Czech Croats lived without a main settlement in parts of the Czech Republic, Slovakia, Germany and Austria. It used to be a continuous string of villages, especially in the region of so-called "Czech Corridor". This corridor known as a link between the Western Slavs and the Southern Slavs, more precisely Kingdom of the Serbs, Croats and Slovenes and Czechoslovakia, was proposed but ultimately rejected at the Paris Peace Conference of 1919.

== Languages ==
A saying of the Czech Croats was "We are a people of three languages." Of all the national minorities, only the Croats were trilingual. They spoke German, and Czech and nurtured Croatian at home. Considering that they often used Czech and German in schools, churches, public administration, the grammar and vocabulary of the Moravian Croats did not remain untouched. The Croatian Cakavian and Ikavian language was mixed with loan words of both Czech and German origins. Croatian is not studied in Czech schools, so the majority younger generation does not speak it. The older generation of Czech Croats preserved the language, culture, and customs by gathering in organizations and reading magazines in Croatian.

== See also ==
- Croats
- List of Croats
- Croatia–Czech Republic relations
- Czechs of Croatia
