= Celestine =

Celestine is a given name and a surname.

== People ==
=== Given name ===
- Pope Celestine I (died 432)
- Pope Celestine II (died 1144)
- Pope Celestine III (c. 1106–1198)
- Pope Celestine IV (died 1241)
- Pope Celestine V (1215–1296)
- Pope-elect Celestine II (1124), elected pope but never formally took office
- Celestine Babayaro (born 1978), Nigerian former footballer
- Celestine Damiano (1911–1967), American Roman Catholic prelate
- Celestine Edwards (c. 1857–1894), political activist
- Célestine Galli-Marié (1840–1905), French mezzo-soprano who created the title role in the opera Carmen
- Celestine Gonzaga-Soriano (born 1984), Filipina singer, host and actress better known as Toni Gonzaga
- Célestine Guynemer de la Hailandière (1798–1882), French-born American Roman Catholic prelate
- Celestine Tate Harrington (1956–1998), quadriplegic street musician known for playing the keyboard with her lips and tongue
- Célestine Hitiura Vaite (born 1966), French-Polynesian writer
- Celestine Iwendi, Nigerian artificial intelligence academic
- Célestine "Tina" Knowles (born 1954), American businesswoman and fashion designer and the mother of Beyonce Knowles and Solange Knowles
- Celestine Lazarus (born 1992), Nigerian professional footballer
- Célestine N'Drin (born 1963), Côte d'Ivoire runner who specialized in the 400 and 800 metres
- Celestine Omehia (born 1959), Nigerian politician
- Celestine Onwuliri (1952–2012), Nigerian academic and university professor of Parasitology
- Celestine Sibley (1914–1999), Southern American author, journalist, and syndicated columnist
- Celestine Ukwu (1940–1977), Igbo highlife musician

=== Surname ===
- Enzo Célestine (born 1997), French professional footballer
- James Celestine (born 1973), Bermudian cricketer

=== Fictional characters ===
- Célestine (Mirbeau), main character and narrator of the French novel The Diary of a Chambermaid, by Octave Mirbeau
- Celestine Tavernier, on the BBC soap opera EastEnders
- Celestine Groht, a fictional character in the anime Gundam SEED DESTINY

=== Pseudonyms ===
- Catharina van Rees (1831-1915), author, editor and composer known by the pseudonym Celéstine

== Other uses ==
- Celestines, a branch of the Benedictine Order of monks
- Celestine Nuns, another name for nuns of the Order of the Most Holy Annunciation
- Celestine (mineral), a mineral, also known as celestite, found worldwide
- Celestine, Indiana, a town in Dubois County, Indiana
- La Celestine (Carlota Valdivia), a 1904 painting from Picasso's Blue Period
- Celestine (album) by Filipino singer Toni Gonzaga, released in May, 2014
- Ernest and Celestine, animated French film, 2012

== See also ==
- Celestin, a character in the anime film Ah! My Goddess: The Movie
- Celestina (disambiguation)
- Celestino
- Celandine (disambiguation)
