= Celestine Edwards =

Dominican editor and anti-racist activist (c.1858–1894)

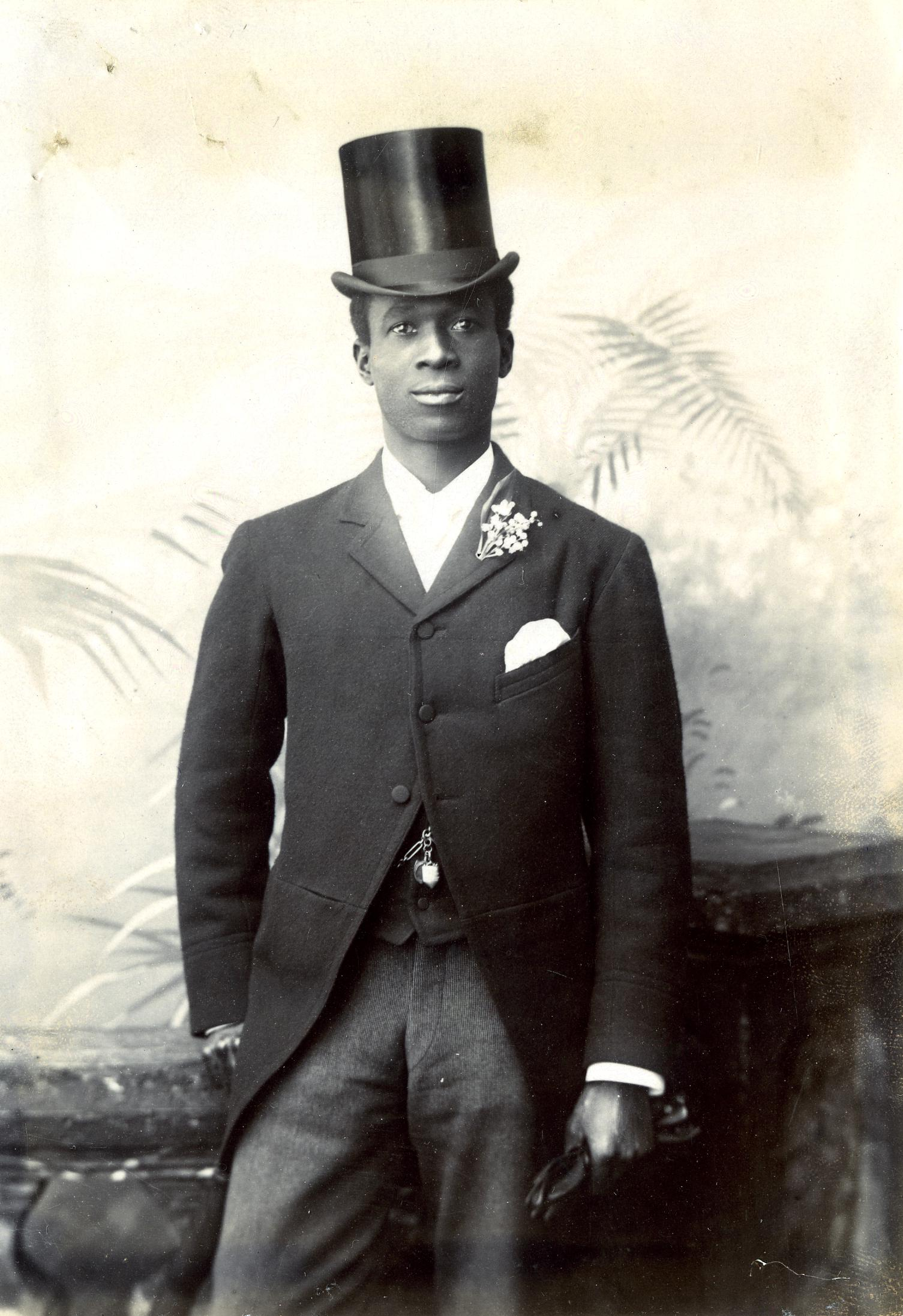
- Born: Samuel Jules Celestine Edwards c. 1858; Dominica
- Died: 1894 (aged 35–36); Dominica
- Education: Theology, King's College, London, 1891
- Known for: Christian, socialist, anti-imperialist and anti-racist views, lecturing and editorial career.

Samuel Jules Celestine Edwards (c. 1858 – 1894) was a Dominican editor, public speaker, author, and anti-racist activist.

== Background ==
Celestine Edwards was born in Dominica. While scholars tend to agree that his birthday fell on 28 December, there is some disagreement about the exact year of his birth. One historian of Black British history, Peter Fryer, provides 1858 and possibly even 1859 as Edwards' birth date, while another, Jonathan Schneer, cites 1857.

== International adventures ==
According to Edwards' autobiographical essays, published in the journals Lux and Fraternity, he left his native Dominica in 1870 and worked odd jobs on ships for a few years. He also spent some time in the United States. He then settled down in Scotland, where he joined the Primitive Methodist Church. After his stay in Scotland, he moved to London to study theology at King's College London. A rare 1888 photograph of Edwards, pictured among fellow theology students and before he became famous, was discovered at King's College London Archives by archivist Frances Pattman. Edwards was never ordained into the Church of England and remained a Methodist after his time at King's. He went on to study medicine at the Royal London Hospital.

== Public speeches and publications ==
During this time, Edwards became a well-known speaker for the Christian Evidence Movement. One of his most famous speeches, "Political Atheism", was published in 1889 by John Kensit. Edwards also founded two magazines: "weekly Christian Evidence journal" paper Lux in 1892, and the anti-racist Fraternity, "Official organ of the Society for the Recognition of the Universal Brotherhood of Man", in 1893.

According to Peter Fryer, Edwards is the first known Black British editor. Edwards' work with Fraternity led him to a successful collaboration with Ida B. Wells during her first anti-lynching tour of the British Isles.
