= Leo Petrović =

Yugoslav historian

The Reverend Leo Petrović OFM
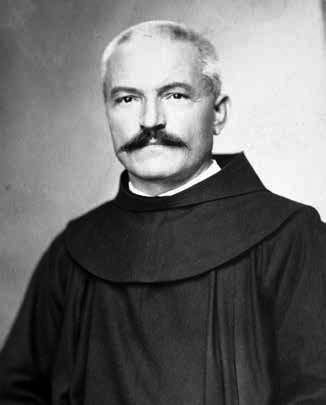
- Born: Grgo Petrović; 28 February 1883; Klobuk, Ljubuški, Bosnia and Herzegovina, Austria-Hungary
- Died: 14 February 1945 (aged 61); Mostar, Yugoslavia
- Cause of death: Murdered by the Yugoslav Partisans
- Education: University of Fribourg
- Known for: Thesis on the origins of the Bosnian Church
- Scientific career
- Fields: Medieval history
- Thesis: Disquisitio historica in originem usus Slavici idiomatis in liturgia apud Slavos ac praecipue Chroatos dissertatio (1908)
- Doctoral advisor: Prince Maximilian of Saxony

Leo Petrović OFM (28 February 1883 – 14 February 1945) was a Herzegovinian Croat Franciscan and historian.

Petrović, a native of Klobuk, Ljubuški, entered the Franciscan Province of Herzegovina in 1900 and was ordained a priest in 1905. He held various monastic and ecclesiastical positions, including being a general vicar of the Diocese of Mostar-Duvno in 1943 and a Provincial of the Franciscan Province of Herzegovina from 1943 until 1945, when he was murdered by the communist Yugoslav Partisans. During World War II, Petrović helped Serbs, Jews and political dissidents, including the Yugoslav Partisans.

The first historian to rebuke the Bogomilist theory about the Bosnian Church, he promoted a thesis about the Bosnian Church having origins in the Catholic Benedictine monastic order and that it used native language and observed the Roman Rite.

== Biography ==
Petrović was born in Klobuk, Ljubuški in Bosnia and Herzegovina, at the time part of Austria-Hungary, into a family of Herzegovinian Croats, and was baptized as Grgo. His father was Marijan, and his mother was Anđa, née Jurčić, from Pogana Vlaka near Grude. His parents were very religious Catholics, but poor. He attended elementary school in Veljaci and Široki Brijeg, where he entered the Franciscan lower gymnasium in 1895, from which he graduated in 1900.

Petrović entered the novitiate of the Franciscan Province of Herzegovina on 4 October 1900 at the Franciscan friary in Humac, Ljubuški, and changed his name to Leo. After finishing his novitiate in 1901, Petrović started to study theology at the Franciscan Theological Seminary in Mostar, where he finished the first three years and the first half of the fourth year. He continued his education at the University of Fribourg in Switzerland in 1904. He took his monastic vows there on 19 October 1904 and was ordained a priest on 30 July 1905. He celebrated his first Mass on 31 July in Klobuk. Under the mentorship of Prince Maximilian of Saxony, he earned his PhD, with a dissertation titled Disquisitio historica in originem usus Slavici idiomatis in liturgia apud Slavos ac praecipue Chroatos dissertatio on 31 January 1908. His dissertation was published later that year in Mostar.

Petrović was appointed professor of theology at the Theological Seminary in Mostar on 1 May 1907 and taught there until 8 May 1917. At the same time, from 1910 until 1916, he served as a secretary of the Franciscan Province of Herzegovina. During the Austro-Hungarian rule in Bosnia and Herzegovina, Petrović supported Croatian political alliance with the Serbs, contrasting the idea of Archbishop Josip Stadler.

He was appointed pastor in Klobuk on 8 May 1917 and remained there until 15 July 1919, when he was appointed guardian of the Franciscan friary in Mostar and a Dean of the Deanery of Mostar. After that, he was again appointed a professor at the Franciscan Theological Seminary in Mostar on 27 April 1925, where he lectured until 21 June 1926. The next day he was appointed a notary of the Bishop of Mostar-Duvno Alojzije Mišić, where he served until 22 April 1943. On 23 April 1943, Petrović was appointed a diocesan general vicar, a post he held until 3 July 1943. From 1937 until 1943, Petrović was also an advisor to the bishop.

=== Historical research ===
Petrović's doctoral thesis titled "Disquisitio historica in originem usus Slavici idiomatis in liturgia apud Slavos ac praecipue Chroatos dissertatio" from the University of Fribourg was published in Latin by the Croatian Joint-stock Printing House in 1908. His doctoral thesis was translated into Croatian by Šime Demo and republished as a chapter titled "Povijesno istraživanje o početku uporabe slavenskoga jezika u liturgiji kod Slavena, napose Hrvata" in the biographical book about him authored by Ante Marić titled Leo Petrović prvi hercegovački franjevac doktor znanosti (Leo Petrović – the first Franciscan Doctor of Science), published in 2008 by the Franciscan Province of Herzegovina.

Petrović was the first historian to rebuke the Bogomilist theory about the Bosnian Church in a paper titled "Krstjani Crkve bosanske" (Christians of the Bosnian Church) from 1944. He was also the first historian to refer to them as Christians, as they called themselves, instead of referring to them by other ideological names. He promoted a thesis that the Bosnian Church had origins in the Catholic Benedictine monastic order, and considered that the Bosnian Church used native language, but observed the Roman Rite. His paper was published only after he died in 1953 and republished again in 1999 by the Franciscan Province of Herzegovina.

Petrović also wrote about the Illyrian priests in Herzegovina, publishing four articles on them in the Catholic periodical "Kršćanska obitelj" (the Christian family) in 1939. Petrović published several scientific articles in various periodicals.

=== World War II ===
After the German invasion of Yugoslavia in April 1941, Petrović was arrested by the Yugoslav police on 15 April, where he remained for a day and was nearly murdered. The next day, he and Cvitan Spužević, a notable Croat lawyer from Mostar, organised peace talks between the warring sides. The tensions between Croats and Serbs were high. The situation worsened after the German invasion of the Soviet Union in June 1941 and the uprising of Serbs in eastern Herzegovina. The authorities of the newly established Independent State of Croatia (NDH) started mass arrests and killings of Serbs between 25 and 26 June 1941.

Petrović publicly opposed the NDH regime because it persecuted Serbs. He met with Poglavnik Ante Pavelić, the leader of the NDH regime in Zagreb somewhere at the end of June or beginning of July 1941 and requested an end to the persecution of Serbs. Petrović also urged General Ivo Herenčić to stop killing the Serbian Orthodox clergy, who ignored him. Petrović also helped to save Jews and the political dissidents, including the Yugoslav Partisans, from the persecution. Even though he opposed the Ustaše regime of the Independent State of Croatia, in December 1941 he told in a conversation with Ante Ciliga, that there could not be any state union with the Serbs.

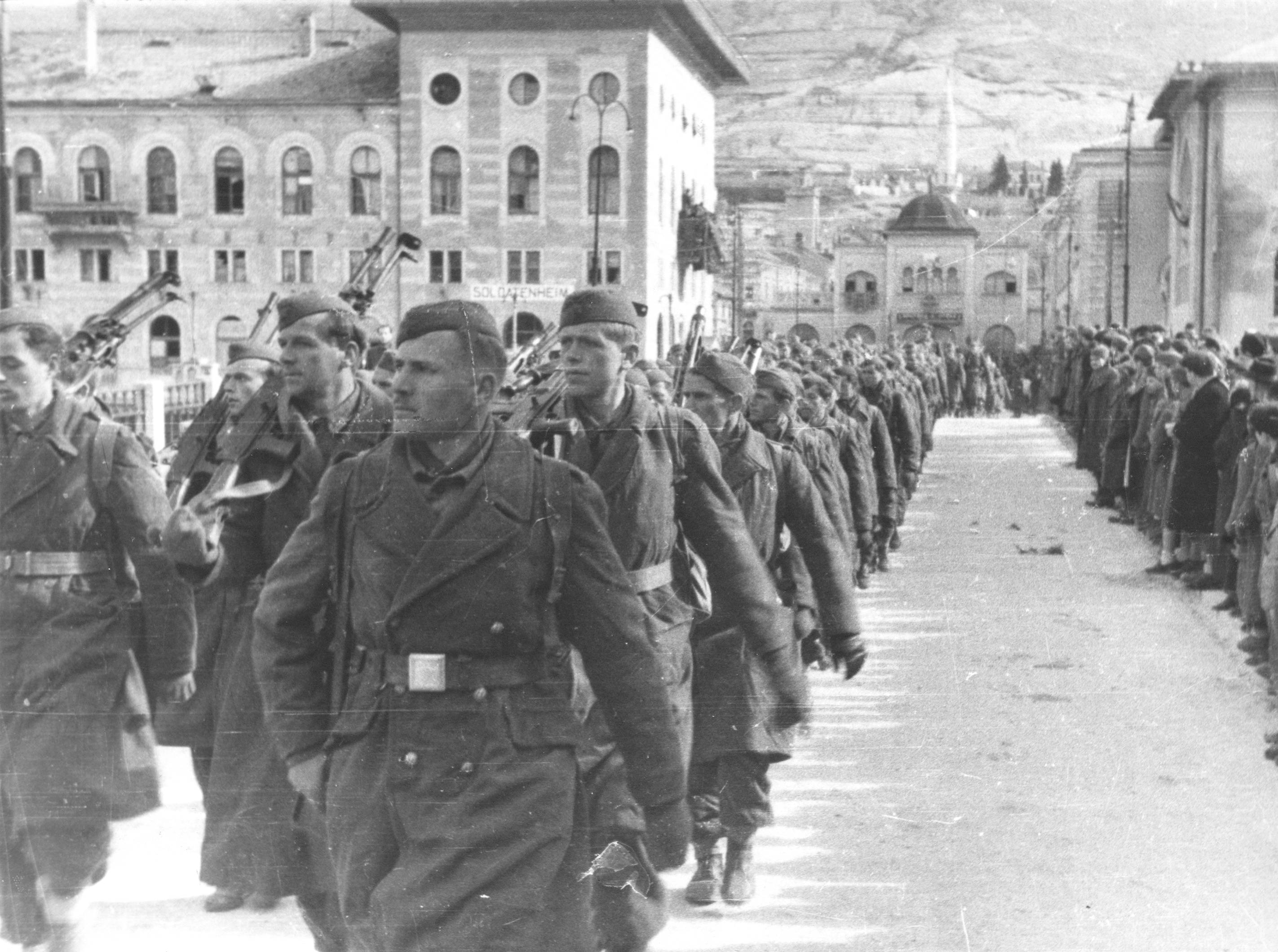
The Partisan 8th Corps entering Mostar

On 3 July 1943, he was elected Provincial of the Franciscan Province of Herzegovina.

The communist Yugoslav Partisans saw Herzegovinian Franciscans as a threat to the spread of communism in Yugoslavia, as they were influential among the peasants as well as intellectuals who studied at the Franciscan schools. With the Germans retreating, the Partisans, with the 8th Corps started advancing towards Mostar in January 1945. Somewhere around that time, the Partisan leadership decided in Trebinje to execute all the Franciscans of the Franciscan friary in Široki Brijeg, which they did, murdering 12 priests on 7 February 1945. Their murderous campaign against the Franciscans continued. The next day, the Partisans murdered 8 other Franciscans who returned to the friary they previously fled, as well as 5 Franciscans who hid in Gradac, Mostar, who were murdered together with the parson of Mostarski Gradac on 8 February. As they advanced, the Partisans murdered three other Franciscans in Izbično on 12 February. They finally reached Mostar on 14 February. Petrović was murdered with six other Franciscans from the Franciscan friary in Mostar by being shot and thrown in the Neretva river. In total, the Partisans murdered 66 Herzegovinian Franciscans.

== Works ==
- Petrović, Leo (1908). Disquisitio historica in originem usus Slavici idiomatis in liturgia apud Slavos ac praecipue Chroatos dissertatio [Historical on the use of the Slavic language in liturgy among Slavs, mainly among Croats] (in Latin). Mostar: Hrvatska dionička tiskara.
- Petrović, Leo (1953). Krstjani Crkve bosnanske [Christians of the Bosnian Church] (in Croatian). Sarajevo: Dobri pastir.

== Notes ==
Catholic Church titles
Preceded by Krešimir Pandžić	Provincial of the Franciscan Province of Herzegovina; 1943–1945	Succeeded by Ignacije Jurković
