= Dočekal =

Dočekal (feminine: Dočekalová) is a Czech surname, which means '[he] has lived to see', '[he] waited for'. Notable people with the surname include:

- Jana Dočekalová (born 1940), Czech figure skater
- Martin Dočekal (born 1990), Czech ice hockey player
- Tomáš Dočekal (born 1989), Czech footballer

== See also ==
- Dočkal
