= Bogoslovska smotra =

Bogoslovska smotra (Ephemerides theologicae Zagrabienses)
- Discipline: Humanities, Theology, Philosophy
- Language: Croatian

Publication details
- Former name: Ephemerides Theologicae
- History: 1910–present
- Publisher: Catholic Faculty of Theology, University of Zagreb (Croatia)
- Frequency: 5/year

Standard abbreviations
- ISO 4: Bogosl. Smotra

Indexing
- ISSN: 0352-3101 (print); 1848-9648 (web)

Links
- Journal homepage; SJR

Bogoslovska smotra (Theological Review) is a Croatian academic journal and among the oldest, still-publishing theology journals in the world, since 1910.

The periodical is referenced in WOS, ESCI, SCOPUS, EBSCO, ERIH PLUS, IBZ Online, Religious and Theological Abstracts.

== History ==
The founder and the first editor of the journal was Josip Pazman. The foundation of the journal was financially encouraged by archbishops Juraj Posilović and Antun Bauer, who established separate funds for its financing. Bauer was a long-standing journal's benefactor. During the Interwar period bishops Ivan Šarić, Antun Akšamović and Josip Marušić were actively aiding publishing of the journal, which was widely distributed through the archdioceses of Zagreb, Ljubljana, Đakovo and Split, as well all the dioceses (from Senj to Subotica) of the state. Smotra was, along with the Glas Koncila, important promotor of the Second Vatican Council at the scientific and theologically-ecclesiastical scale.

To take scientific papers by Croatian theologians and philosophers beyond the Croatian-speaking area, the professors of the Catholic Faculty of Theology have been, since the early 2000s, striving to publish a part of this work in foreign languages. The Faculty Council decided in 2019 to add to the existing four printed issues, the fifth issue, as an electronic journal in foreign languages.

Notable editors were Tomislav Janko Šagi-Buntić, Adalbert Rebić, Tomislav Ivančić, Ivan Šaško..., as well as contributors Josip Weissgerber, Celestin Tomić, Bonaventura Duda, Kamilo Dočkal, Rudolf Vimer...
