= Petar Barbarić =

Bosnian Herzegovinian Jesuit (1874–1897)

Venerable Petar Barbarić SJ

Personal details
- Born: 19 May 1874 Šiljevišta near Klobuk, Bosnia Vilayet, Ottoman Empire
- Died: 15 April 1897 (aged 22) Travnik, Condominium of Bosnia and Herzegovina, Austria-Hungary

Petar Barbarić, SJ (19 May 1874 – 15 April 1897) was a Bosnian Herzegovinian Jesuit from Šiljevišta, near Ljubuški, Bosnia Vilayet (modern Bosnia and Herzegovina, who was in the novitiate and in the midst of his studies for the priesthood before he died of tuberculosis. Upon realizing his condition, he was allowed to make his solemn vows before his death. Barbarić was known for his devotion to the Sacred Heart of Jesus and his charismatic nature among his peers.

On 18 March 2015, he was proclaimed to be venerable after Pope Francis acknowledged the fact that Barbarić had lived a life of heroic virtue.

== Life ==
Petar Barbarić was born in present-day Bosnia and Herzegovina in 1874 in the Croatian family of Ante and Kata Barbarić (nee. Tolj). He had eight brothers; one was the Franciscan Mate (religious: Marko) Barbarić-Lesko (19 Feb. 1865 – 6 Feb. 1945) who was killed and whose sainthood cause has commenced. He spent his childhood on the farm with the sheep and was known for being an avid reader of religious texts. While in the fields he had his staff in one hand and recited rosaries in the other. His parents also started his initial education with catechism instruction.

In 1886 the local school in the village opened and he was quick to enter it to commence his studies. He completed his studies in 1888 prior to the required time he was meant to be in school. Had he been in the school for the traditional period he would have concluded his studies in 1890. He ended his time in school with honors. He could not afford for further education so became an apprentice in Vitina where he became a sales assistant and clerk. He remained there until 1889

He commenced his studies for the priesthood in Travnik with the aid of his former teacher Tomislav Vuksan when the latter received a letter asking for recommendations of the best students qualified for further studies or for the priesthood. Both Barbarić and his father traveled to Travnik after their departure on 24 August 1889. They arrived on the following 27 August. He was known for his statement that he would much rather prefer to die than offend Jesus Christ. In 1892 he qualified in the Italian language. He went on to complete courses in both French and German. Barbarić believed that it would help him in the future to hear confessions. Barbarić was appointed as the prefect of his class and he encouraged his peers to receive the Eucharist at the end of the first week of each month on the date of the Lord's Passion. In 1896 he made the decision not just to become a diocesan priest but rather a Jesuit.

He demonstrated initial signs of influenza after he returned from an out-of-town trip with his friends on 7 April 1896. Less than a week after Easter, the group spent their vacation on a picnic and was caught in a storm. However, this transcended into tuberculosis unbeknownst to specialists who prescribed him a summer's rest at his home. Barbarić spent a serene summer at home but was unaware of his condition, which worsened when he returned for his studies. However, he did not know he had contracted tuberculosis until he was re-examined once he returned to resume his studies. He had difficulties walking and had to use a cane to move about a room and was forced to drop his studies to recuperate.

On 11 March 1897, he said to his confessor: "I did a novena to Saint Francis Xavier to ask for healing, and tomorrow we'll start a novena to Saint Joseph asking for a good death". Barbarić received the Anointing of the Sick on 10 April. A dispensation for him to make his solemn profession as a Jesuit came that week, allowing Barbarić to prepare. He wanted to profess on 15 April, but his confessor moved it to 13 April since he believed that Barbarić would not survive to that point. Barbarić professed his solemn vows on the evening of 13 April 1897.

Barbarić died due to tuberculosis on 15 April 1897 on the occasion of the Last Supper. He could not speak much at this point and could not eat. In the first hours of the afternoon, he asked for a crucifix which he kissed and said: "Jesus". At 2 pm he made a deep sigh and died. He was buried on 17 April. His remains were relocated in 1935 though removed and hidden in 1944 until being bought out again and later relocated for the last time in 1998 to the church of Saint Alojzije.

== Beatification process ==
The beatification process commenced in Vrhbosna in 1939 under Pope Pius XII in an informative process. The process concluded its business in 1943 during World War II. Theologians maintained in a decree in 1945 that all his writings were in line with the magisterium of the Catholic faith. The second process – following the re-ignition of the cause decades later – spanned from 1998 until 2007. These processes were validated in Rome at the behest of the Congregation for the Causes of Saints in 2012.

Historians met to discuss the cause on 20 November 2012 to ascertain if historical obstacles existed and the reason that the cause had not been introduced earlier as a recognition of holiness. Historical questions bought into question were addressed on an adequate level and so the cause was given approval on 20 November 2012. On 18 March 2015 the title of a venerable was conferred upon him once Pope Francis had signed a decree that recognized the fact that Barbarić had lived a life of heroic virtue. A miracle attributed to Barbarić was investigated in the diocese of its origin and received validation from officials in Rome on 13 June 2014. The postulator assigned to the cause is the Jesuit priest Anton Witwer.

== Bibliography ==
The Croatian Jesuit Josip Weissgerber published his biography Zvona velike subote ("The Bells of Holy Saturday") that was translated to Polish in 1989.
