= Klobuk, Ljubuški =

Klobuk Klobuk Клобук
- Village
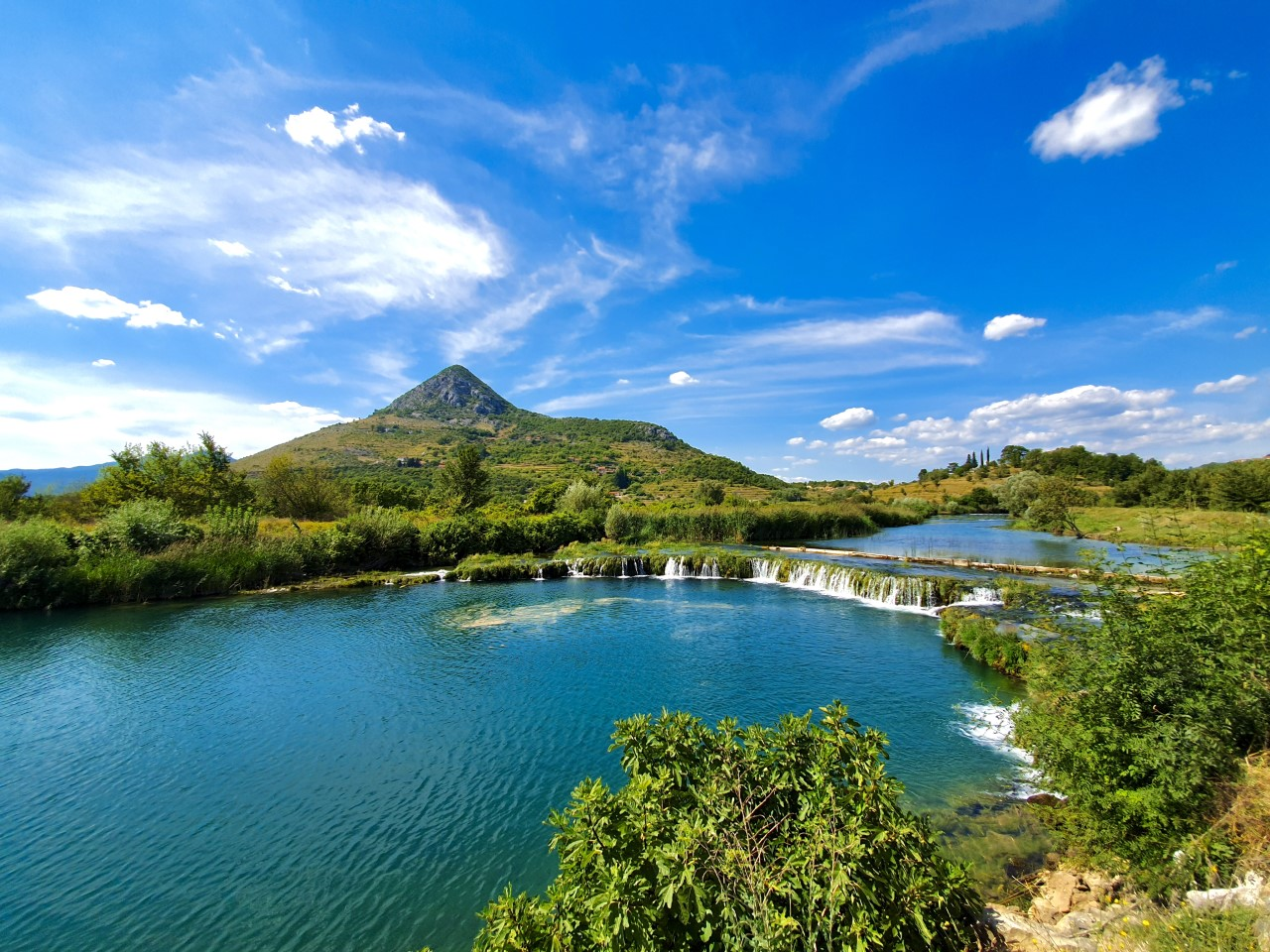
- Klobuk hill and Ćukov slap (eng. travertine cascade) on the river Trebižat

- Location within Bosnia and Herzegovina
- Coordinates: 43.2786°N 17.4458°E
- Country: Bosnia and Herzegovina
- Entity: Federation of Bosnia and Herzegovina
- Canton: West Herzegovina
- Municipality: Ljubuški

Area
  - Total: 9.59 sq mi (24.84 km^{2})

Population (2013)
  - Total: 1,232
  - Density: 128.5/sq mi (49.60/km^{2})
- Time zone: UTC+1 (CET)
  - Summer (DST): UTC+2 (CEST)

Klobuk is a village in the municipality of Ljubuški, Bosnia and Herzegovina, located on the western outskirts of the municipality. It partially lays alongside a section of the regional road M-6 (Grude - Ljubuški - Čapljina - Metković), with road connections to the famous Marian pilgrimage in Medjugorje and the nearest border crossing with Croatia that's some 5 km away.

Klobuk has got its name from the Klobuk hill (468m), that's central to the place, whose specific shape resembles a type of hat. (Klobuk eng. hat)

Klobuk consists of 12 hamlets that are quite scattered around - Kapel Mala, Pržine, Šiljevište, Borajna, Zastražnica, Poljane, Vlake, Čuljkova Njiva, Dabranja, Brdo, Osoje and Drače.

Klobuk, namely its hamlet Šiljevište, has become increasingly popular amongst Catholic pilgrims who flock here to visit the birth place of a God's Servant, the Venerable Petar Barbaric, to worship him and pray for his intercession at this sanctuary that consists of Petar's refurbished old house where he grew up, and a recently blessed chapel serving as a place for gathering and worship.

== History ==
Klobuk was first mentioned in 1585 in an Ottoman list of villages.

== Traditional Crafts and Agriculture ==
Klobuk has long been home to a variety of traditional crafts and agricultural practices that reflect the village’s cultural heritage and adaptation to the karst landscape of Herzegovina. Historically, local artisans produced handmade pottery, wood carvings, and woven textiles, crafts that were essential to daily life and local economy but have gradually declined in modern times. In recent years, there has been a renewed interest in preserving these artisanal skills through community workshops and cultural events aimed at younger generations. Agriculture remains a vital part of life in Klobuk, with residents cultivating olives, grapes, figs, and other crops well-suited to the rocky, Mediterranean-influenced terrain. These traditional farming methods, passed down through generations, emphasize sustainability and respect for the natural environment, contributing to the unique character of the village and its landscape.

== Population ==
According to the 2013 Census, the total population of Klobuk was 1.232, gravitating mostly towards Ljubuški and nearby municipalities, including Vrgorac in neighbouring Croatia.

Klobuk
Year of census	1971.	1981.	1991.	2013.
Croats	1,974 (99,59%)	1,721 (98,06%)	1,555 (98,48%)	1,223 (99,27%)
Others or unknown	3 (0,40%)	34 (1,92%)	24 (1,51%)	9 (0,73%)
Total	1,982	1,755	1,579	1,232

== Notable people ==
- Andrija Artuković, lawyer, politician, ultranationalist, member of the Ustasha movement. Convicted WWII Nazi war criminal and responsible for the execution of at least 100,000 innocent people in concentration camps.
- Milan Artuković, former Managing Director of Franck Ltd. (d.o.o.), Zagreb, Croatia.
- Petar Barbarić (1874-1897), a charismatic Catholic priest who lived a life of heroic virtue, proclaimed venerable and expected to be beatified by the Pope Francis.
- Nevenko Barbarić, former mayor of Ljubuški and a representative of Croatian Diaspora in Croatian Parliament (Sabor).
- Milijan Brkić, former vice-president of Croatian Parliament (Sabor) and former Vice-Chair of HDZ (Croatian Democratic Union).
- Marija Pejčinović Burić, Secretary General of the Council of Europe, former Deputy Prime Minister and Minister of Foreign & European Affairs of Croatia.
- Dubravko Grgić, founder of Euroherc Osiguranje Plc. (d.d.) and Agram Plc. insurance companies, Bosnia & Herzegovina, Croatia
- Željko Musa, a handball player.
- Ivan Musić (1848-1888), a Catholic priest, given the title Duke (Vojvoda) of Herzegovina by Prince Nikola of Montenegro for leading the uprising against the Ottomans in 1875 and 1878.
- Leo Petrović, a Franciscan and a historian.
- Hrvoje Pezić, an entrepreneur with investments in property development, insurance and hospitality (Zagreb City Hotels d.o.o. - Double Tree, Canopy and Garden Inn Hilton Hotels), Zagreb, Croatia.
- Milenko and Ivan Rašić, "rags-to-richess" entrepreneurial brothers with a multi-million dollar business in poultry industry (Rasic Hnos. S.A), Buenos Aires, Argentina.
- Zvonimir Remeta (1909-1964), writer and author.
- Božo Skoko, a university professor and media personality, Zagreb, Croatia.
