= Czechs of Croatia =

Czechs of Croatia Česi u Hrvatskoj Češi v Chorvatsku
- Coat of arms of the Czechs in Croatia

Total population
- 9,641 (2011)

Regions with significant populations
- Bjelovar-Bilogora: 506
- Požega-Slavonia: 80

Languages
- Czech, Croatian

Religion
- Roman Catholicism

Related ethnic groups
- Slovaks

Czechs are one of the recognised minorities of Croatia. According to the census of 2011 there were 9,641 Czechs in Croatia, comprising 0.22% of total population.

== Geographic representation ==
Most Croatian Czechs live in Western Slavonia especially around the cities of Daruvar and Grubišno Polje. They comprise 5.25% of population of Bjelovar-Bilogora County and 0.83% of Požega-Slavonia County. They comprise a relative majority in Končanica municipality and in villages like Veliki Zdenci, Mali Zdenci, Golubinjak etc. They can be also found in almost all major towns in Croatia.

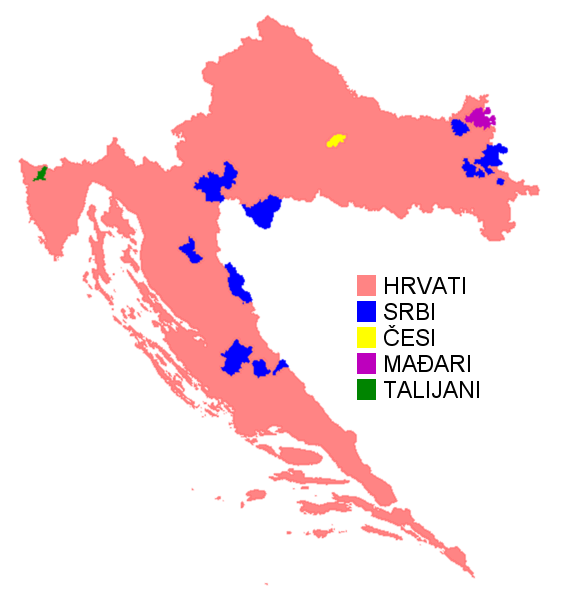
Croatian regions where czech minority make up majority of population represented in yellow

Municipality	Percentage
Končanica	46.67%
Dežanovac	23.48%
Daruvar	18.90%
Grubišno Polje	18.02%
Sirač	10.21%
Hercegovac	9.60%
Veliki Grđevac	4.76%
Lipik	3.52%
Pakrac	3.03%
Kaptol	2.49%
Lipovljani	2.43%
Kutina	1.53%
Garešnica	1.34%
Dubrava	1.13%
Kutjevo	1.12%
Đulovac	1.05%

As of 2009, Czech is officially used in one municipality and five other settlements in Croatia, according to the European Charter for Regional or Minority Languages.

== History ==
After the Treaty of Karlowitz in 1699, Slavonia changed hands from the Ottomans to Habsburgs, and the Muslim population fled. This left large swathes of land vacant, and the Habsburgs started to colonize new lands with people from all parts of their Empire. The first Czechs arrived in Croatia around the 1750s, with the first documented site of mass Czech immigration being the village of Ivanovčani around 1792. The first Czechs were otherwise mostly settled in Western Slavonia throughout the 19th century. In Croatia, they could buy from ten or more acres of arable land for price of 1-acre (4,000 m^{2}) they sold in the Czech lands.

Czechs also settled other parts of Croatia such as Gorski kotar, and bigger cities where they were praised as skilled workers and clerks, but were assimilated in two or three generations. One of these urban Czechs was August Šenoa, a Croatian writer. Czechs soon found the need to culturally organise themselves, and in 1874 the first Česká Beseda (Czech word) was founded in Zagreb. This was an organization promoting Czech culture and the use of Czech in Croatia, and organised the first theater play in Czech in the same year. In time České Besedy (Czech plural of Česká Beseda) were founded all across Croatia, and opened Czech libraries and Sport societies of the Czech Sokol movement. In 1911 the first Czech newspaper started printing in Zagreb.

The Kingdom of Serbs, Croats and Slovenes, established after the First World War, was very amicable to the Czech minority. This has been attributed to the cordial relations with Czechoslovakia during the interwar period, and joint Slavic roots. The first Czech school was open in 1922 in Daruvar, and first kindergarten in 1926 also in Daruvar. Czechs organized themselves politically and formed a Czech party which was active only in the first years of Kingdom. From 1922 the newspaper Jugoslávští Čechoslováci (Yugoslav Czechoslovaks) was printed in Duruvar. Czechs, just like Slovaks generally did not collaborate with the occupying powers during the World War II. Some of them left to Czechoslovakia after the war, but a number of them subsequently returned, as the communists seized power in Czechoslovakia.

In Socialist, post World War II Yugoslavia Czechs enjoyed even greater rights, and more schools were opened. After the break-up of Yugoslavia, Czech areas were found near war operations and many Czechs participated in Croatian army.

Czechs are officially recognized as an autochthonous national minority, and as such, they, together with the Slovaks of Croatia, elect a special representative to the Croatian Parliament.

In the elections of 2000, 2003, and 2007, the Czech and Slovak representative was Zdenka Čunhil from the Croatian Peasant Party.

== Culture ==
The Czechs are organised in 24 Česka Beseda's all across Croatia that form the Czech Union of Croatia, an organization that promotes Czech language and culture in Croatia. Folk dance, poetry, singing and Czech courses are the main activities of Beseda's. Some Beseda's even have theater groups, and the Czech Union prints their weekly magazine called Jednota (Unity). They organize festivals of theater groups, festivals of Czech children song, Naše Jaro-festival of schoolchildren cultural activities, Vanočka- festival of younger folkdance groups and biennial manifestation Dožinky in Daruvar celebrating end of harvest works. There are dozens of Czech primary schools and kindergartens and High School in Daruvar has one Czech department.

There are also two industrial brands associated with Croatian Czechs; Zdenka cheese, produced in a factory in Veliki Zdenci dominantly Czech village and Staročeško (Old-Czech) beer produced by a brewery in Daruvar.

They are also referred to by their non-Czech neighbours as Pemci.

== See also ==
- Croatia–Czech Republic relations
- Czech diaspora
- Ethnic groups in Croatia
- Croats in the Czech Republic
