= Josip Weissgerber =

Croatian academic

- Born: 4 May 1922; Vinkovci
- Died: 18 April 1985 (aged 62); Zagreb
- Education: Ph.D. in Psychology and Philosophy
- Alma mater: University of Zagreb, Catholic University of Leuven
- Occupations: philosopher, writer, missionary
- Known for: Contributions to psychology, philosophy, and theology
- Notable work: Zvona velike subote, U svjetlu metahistorije, Osnovni zakon svemira, Psihologija, Sir Thomas More – Engleski Sokrat, and more

Josip Weissgerber (4 May 1922 – 18 April 1985), was a Croatian Jesuit, philosopher, writer and missionary.

== Education ==
Born in Slavonian town Vinkovci, Weissgerber attended the classical gymnasium in Travnik after which he graduated theology, psychology, germanistics, anglistics and French Studies at the Faculty of Humanities and Social Sciences of the University of Zagreb. He obtained a doctorate in psychology (1970) and philosophy (1972) at the Catholic University of Leuven in Belgium.

== Work ==
Weissberger lectured experimental psychology, history of philosophy, anthropology, ontology, anthropological philosophy and theodicy at the Faculty of Philosophy and Theology (1969–81) as well as experimental psychology at the Catholic Faculty of Theology in Zagreb (1691–71). He also held marriage advising seminaries.

List of published works:

- Zvona velike subote (The Bells of the Holy Saturday; Biography of the Petar Barbarić; translated to Polish in 1989). Re-published as Uskrsna zvona (Easter Bells)
- U svjetlu metahistorije: razmišljanja za akademičare nedjeljom u 11 sati (works in metahistory)
- Osnovni zakon svemira (The fundamental principle of the universe, 1967)
- Psihološki aspekti odgojnih sukoba (Psychological aspects of educational conflicts, 1969)
- Psihologija (Psychology, 1972)
- Sir Thomas More – Engleski Sokrat (Sir Thomas More – The English Socrates, 1974)
- Načinimo čovjeka (Let's make a human)
- Antropologija: filozofija o čovjeku (Anthropology: Philosophy of the human)
- Razvojna pogojenost religioznosti (in Slovene)
- Studije za obitelj (Family studies, 1978)

His scientific articles in psychology, anthropology, philosophy, communicology and theology were published in Obnovljeni Život, Bogoslovska smotra and Crkva u svijetu. He was a missionary in England, pastoral worker in Germany and Belgium. In 1981 he went in the mission in Zambia where he lectured anthropology, history of the contemporary philosophy, ontology and cosmology at the Mpima Seminary. He was a missionary in Zaire as well.
