= La Celestina (disambiguation) =

La Celestina is a work entirely in dialogue published in 1499.

La Celestina may also refer to:

- La Celestina (1996 film), a Spanish drama film
- The Wanton of Spain or La Celestina, a 1969 Spanish drama film
- La Celestina (opera), an opera by Flavio Testi
- La Celestina P... R..., a 1965 Italian comedy film

== See also ==
- Celestina (disambiguation)
