= Celestin Tomić =

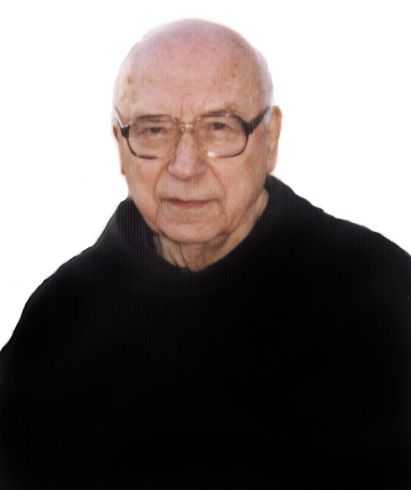
Celestin Tomić

Fr. Celestin (Dinko Bruno) Tomić (6 October 1917 in Vis – 23 September 2006 in Zagreb) was a Croatian Franciscan Conventual and biblical scholar.

== Early life ==
He came from a large family of the island of Vis manual workers. Dinko Bruno was born on 6 October 1917, as the youngest among thirteen children. After attending primary school in his native island of Vis, he joined the Order of Franciscan Conventuals, having met the friars as an altar boy in the friary church of St. Jerome on the Vis peninsula of Prirovo.

== At the seminary ==
As a twelve-year-old school boy in 1929, Dinko Bruno left for the seminary of Franciscan Conventuals, at the time located in the Slovenian friary of Ptuj – the schooling place for the candidates of the then still unique Franciscan Province of St. Jerome in the Kingdom of Yugoslavia. In Ptuj, he spent five secondary school years. Then in 1934 he began his novitiate at the Zagreb friary of The Holy Ghost. On that occasion, Dinko Bruno, as a Franciscan Conventual, chose the name Celestin (Rajko) to be his religious name.

== The studies ==
He entered the Catholic Divinity College in Zagreb in 1937. After two years, he completed the philosophical group of subjects. In the meantime, on 13 October 1938, he pronounced solemn vows, thereby definitively choosing the Order of Franciscan Conventuals. After the fourth semester of Divinity College in Zagreb, in November 1941, due to the threat posed by both war and famine, together with his colleagues from the same Province of St. Jerome, he was sent to continue his studies in Rome. It is there that, after a few years, he completed his divinity studies at the Pontifical School of Theology of St. Bonaventure. In the meantime, on 19 December 1942, he was ordained for priesthood in Rome.

== In Rome ==
After completing regular theological studies in Rome, he was supposed to return to the country, but his return was made impossible by the capitulation of Italy in 1943. Continuing specialized studies in theology at the same University in Rome, Fr. Celestin was pronounced a Divinity Studies Doctor on 19 October 1945. Upon the decision of the then supreme superior of the Order of Franciscan Conventuals, the American Fr. Bede Hessa, a great friend of some professors of the Biblical studies institution "Biblicum", Celestin joined the Biblical studies, although his personal preferences went more in the direction of Eastern liturgy. At that time, there were several Croatian religious in Rome who were specializing Biblical studies there (the Jesuit Schmidt, the Franciscans Augustinović and Melada), with whom Celestin kept a permanent bond. He gained his master's degree at the "Biblicum" on 5 July 1946, returning home soon after that.

== A professor in Split ==
In 1947 he went to Split, teaching Holy Scripture and biblical languages at the Divinity College there until 1953. As a definitor of the Zagreb custodia, he was moved to Zagreb, where, in 1953, he started teaching biblical languages and some subjects from the Holy Scriptures at the Catholic Divinity College. On several occasions, he acted as vice-dean and dean of the said Faculty, while, in 1988, he was retired. Fr. Celestin was also teaching different Biblical subjects on the Philosophical-Theological Institute of the Society of Jesus in Zagreb, from 1970 to 1994. Over a number of years, each week, he was explaining various Biblical texts to the novices of the Carmelite sisters on Vrhovec and of the Sisters of Mercy in Frankopanska St. in Zagreb.

== Biblical language editor ==
When the exhaustive project of publishing a new Croatian translation of the Bible was initiated, Celestin acted as Biblical language editor for most Old Testament books. He also wrote the initial remarks accompanying the Old Testament Wisdom Books. The Zagreb-based publishing house "Stvarnost" implemented the project, with the first edition appearing on the Croatian market in 1968, followed by a number of re-editions. The publishing house was soon taken over by "Kršćanska sadašnjost", also from Zagreb. Fr. Celestin also acted as a Biblical sub-editor for the New Testament edition prepared by Bonaventura Duda and Jerko Fućak (1973), and as a Biblical auditor of all Croatian lectionaries used by the Church officials in liturgy.

== Peritus, Iudex ex officio ==
The archbishop Franjo Kuharić appointed Celestin as theological expert in the beatification process of the servant of God Alojzije Stepinac. In this capacity, Tomić, as an expert, expressed his opinion on nearly all the books and archival materials used in the process. As a theological expert, he spent two years in Rome, preparing "The Information" on the said beatification process.

== At the Province ==
As a member of the Croatian Province of Franciscan Conventuals, Fr. Celestin was performing many highly responsible duties. On several occasions, he served as the Province's definitor (administration member), while he also served a three-year mandate as the Province vicar. For about fifteen years, in Zagreb, he was the magister of seminarians – theology undergraduates. Since the first publication years of the "Messenger of St. Anthony", later (as well as today's) "Veritas", he acted as a member of the Editorial Board of the said monthly magazine, becoming its permanent correspondent towards the end of 1964 and continuing his work for the magazine all the way until his death. While writing for the magazine, Celestin was encouraged to start publishing his works on Biblical subjects. It turned out to be an extremely fruitful endeavour. He produced around fifty printed works, published mostly by the Croatian Province of Franciscan Conventuals, but also by some other publishers ("Kršćanska sadašnjost", "Glas Koncila"...). He also published a number of professional Biblical articles in numerous scientific, as well as popular magazines and messengers.

== "Spe gaudentes" ==
On the occasion of Celestin Tomić's 80th birthday, in October 1997, a special reception was organized at Zagreb's Sveti Duh. A Collection of Papers was presented on the occasion, prepared in the honour of the celebrant, entitled "Spe gaudentes" - "Joyful in Hope". The title was suggested by Celestin himself. Namely, these are the initial words of one among the most important Second Vatican Council documents. "Christian hope and joy must permeate the turning points of history, such as our passing from the second to the third Christian millennium, in spite of many dark clouds threatening Church, social, family and individual horizons. After all, St. Paul’s times were not any easier or better, and still the tireless Apostle of the Gentiles felt the need to invite the faithful to be joyful in hope against all odds: Spe gaudentes!" (Cf. Rom 12; 12).

== Tomić's written works ==
=== Books ===
After he gained a divinity doctor's degree in Rome in October 1945, with the following thesis: Il mistero di Cristo secondo S. Ignazio Martire (The Mystery of Christ According to St. Ignatius the Martyr), a copy of the thesis was published in Rome in 1954, entitled L'intima natura della vita cristiana secondo S. Ignazio Martire (The Private Nature of Christian Life According to St. Ignatius the Martyr). Some fifteen years after his doctor's thesis, Fr. Celestin started publishing numerous works on almost exclusively Biblical subjects. For the needs of undergraduates, the following works were mimeographed:

1. Approaching the Bible. A General Introduction into the Holy Scripture (1969)
2. The Old Testament Salvation Message (1970)
3. The Biblical Theology of the Family (1972)
4. The Biblical Message of Salvation History (1972)
5. The Wisdom Books (1973).

Some of the above materials were later to become included in the books that soon started appearing in increasingly shorter intervals:

1. Evanđelja djetinjstva Isusova (1971.) /The Gospels of Jesus' Childhood/
2. Psalmi. Kratki uvod i komentar (1973.) /Psalms. Short Introduction and Commentary/
3. Uzvišena tajna. Ljubav i obitelj u biblijskoj i liturgijskoj poruci (1974.) /Sublime Mystery. Love and Family in the Biblical and Liturgical Message/
4. Marijina poruka (1975.) /Mary's Message/
5. Gospina krunica (1976.) /The Our Lady's Rosary/
6. Prapovijest spasenja (1977.) /The Ancient History of Salvation/
7. Praoci Izraela (1978.) /The Forefathers of Israel/
8. Ivan Krstitelj (1978.) /John the Baptist/
9. Izlazak (1979.) /Exodus/
10. U Zemlju obećanja (1980.) /Into the Promised Land/
11. Petar - Stijena (1980.) /Peter The Rock/
12. Tajna vjere (1981.) /The Mystery of Faith/
13. Savao Pavao (1982.) /Saul Paul/
14. Davidovo doba (1982.) /The Age of David/
15. Poruka spasenja Sv. Pisma Starog zavjeta (1983.) /The Old Testament Salvation Message/
16. Marija Majka (1984.) /Mother Mary/
17. Ilijino vrijeme (1985.) /Elijah's Age/
18. Pristup Bibliji (1986.) /Approaching the Bible/
19. Psalmi (drugo, prošireno izdanje, 1986.) /Psalms – Second Expanded Edition/
20. Veliki proroci (1987.) /Great Prophets/
21. Marija, Majka vjere (1988.) /Mary, The Mother of Faith/
22. Začeci židovstva (1988.) /The Origins of Judaism/
23. Vrijeme iščekivanja (1989.) /The Age of Expectation/
24. Isus iz Nazareta: Bog s nama (1990.) /Jesus of Nazareth: God with Us/
25. Isus iz Nazareta: Prorok i Krist (1991.) /Jesus of Nazareth: Prophet and Christ/
26. Isus iz Nazareta: Gospodin slave (1992.) /Jesus of Nazareth: The Lord of Glory/
27. Počeci Crkve: Petar prvak apostola (1994.) /The Beginnings of Church: Peter The First Among the Apostles/
28. Počeci Crkve: Pavao apostol naroda (1995.) / The Beginnings of Church: Paul Apostle of the Gentiles/
29. Počeci Crkve: Ivan evanđelist ljubavi (1995.) / The Beginnings of Church: John The Evangelist of Love/
30. Otkrivenje sv. Ivana apostola (1997.) /Revelation of Saint John The Apostle/
31. Alojzije kardinal Stepinac, nadbiskup zagrebački: Propovijedi, govori, poruke (1941–1946) (1996.) /Cardinal Alojzije Stepinac, The Archbishop of Zagreb: Sermons, Speeches, Messages/
32. Duhovni lik Bl. Alojzija Stepinca, mučenika (2001.) /The Spiritual Figure of Blessed Alojzije Stepinac, a Martyr/
33. Bl. Alojzije Stepinac, marijanski biskup (2003.) /Blessed Alojzije Stepinac, A Marian Bishop/
34. Veliča - Magnificat (2004.)
35. Stol Riječi (I.): Biblijske poruke svagdanjih čitanja, vrijeme došašća i božićno vrijeme, korizmeno i vazmeno vrijeme (2004.) /The Table of the Word: Biblical Messages of Liturgical Readings: Advent, Christmas Time, Lent and Easter Time/
36. Stol Riječi (II.): Biblijske poruke svagdanjih čitanja, vrijeme kroz godinu od 1. do 17. tjedna (2004.) /The Table of the Word: Biblical Messages of Liturgical Readings: Weeks 1 through 17/
37. Stol Riječi (III.): Biblijske poruke svagdanjih čitanja, vrijeme kroz godinu od 18. do 34. tjedna (2004.) /The Table of the Word: Biblical Messages of Liturgical Readings: Weeks 18 through 34/
38. Stol Riječi (IV.): Biblijske poruke nedjeljnih čitanja, god. A (2004.) /The Table of the Word: Biblical Messages of Sunday Readings, Year A/
39. Stol Riječi (V.): Biblijske poruke nedjeljnih čitanja, god. B (2005.) /The Table of the Word: Biblical Messages of Sunday Readings, Year B/
40. Stol Riječi (VI.): Biblijske poruke nedjeljnih čitanja, god. C (2006.) /The Table of the Word: Biblical Messages of Sunday Readings, Year C/
41. Moć pisane riječi: Blaženi Alojzije Stepinac i katolički mediji (2006.) /The Power of the Written Word: Blessed Alojzije Stepinac and the Catholic Media/

The following works were published after his death:

1. Vjera i postojanje sotone (2006.) /Faith and the Existence of Satan/
2. Marija u svom vremenu (2007.) /Mary in Her Own Time/
3. Oče naš (2007.) /Our Father/
4. Ministerijalno svećenstvo u životu i učenju blaženoga Alojzija Stepinca (2009.) /Ministerial Priesthood in the Life and Teaching of Blessed Alojzije Stepinac/

=== Unpublished materials ===
Celestin has also left many unpublished materials that are already prepared for printing. This mostly concerns the huge work – over 3,000 typed, double-spaced pages – about the life of Blessed Alojzije Stepinac, several spiritual retreats, and considerations on religious life.

=== Contributions to magazines and papers ===
Celestin Tomić started writing for various Catholic publications as a young seminarian. Thus it was already in 1939 that he started with regular contributions to the "St. Anthony’s Sanctuary" monthly, launched by Franciscan Conventuals in Zagreb in the 1930s. Fr. Celestin wrote the total of 37 articles for the monthly, all the way until 1943, when he was in Rome, while the cooperation was rendered most difficult because of the ongoing war. After that, under the pressure of prohibitions and confiscations, the Church was pushed into silence and the Catholic press disappeared entirely. It was only in the 60th, with the announcement of the Second Vatican Council - parallel with the state institutions somewhat releasing their pressure on the Catholic Church – that the religious press started reawakening. This was partially the credit of Fr. Celestin's somewhat younger fellow Franciscan Conventual, Fr. Ivon Ćuk, who, at the Easter of 1962, launched the "Messenger of St. Anthony of Padua ". The Catholic press started growing again and here is where Celestin found the right place for his apostolate of spreading and explaining the word of God. In the course of 1964, he started publishing a series of Biblical articles in the "Messenger of St. Anthony" on the "Sermon on the Mount", followed by the series on the subject of the Lord's Prayer - the "Our Father". Celestin continued writing for "Veritas – The Messenger of St. Anthony of Padua" monthly all the way until his death. During some forty years of his writing for "Veritas" as much as 750 of his articles were published – almost exclusively on Biblical topics. Celestin also wrote for other popular papers, and especially for the scientific magazines of the Catholic Church in Croatia. During that same period, he was publishing professional Biblical papers in the following magazines: "Bogoslovska smotra" (17 articles), "Obnovljeni život" (31), "Crkva u svijetu" (13) and "Posvećeni život" (5). He also wrote quite a number of papers for various Collections of Papers published in the honour of outstanding Croatian historical figures or events.
