= Ivanovčani =

- Neighbourhood
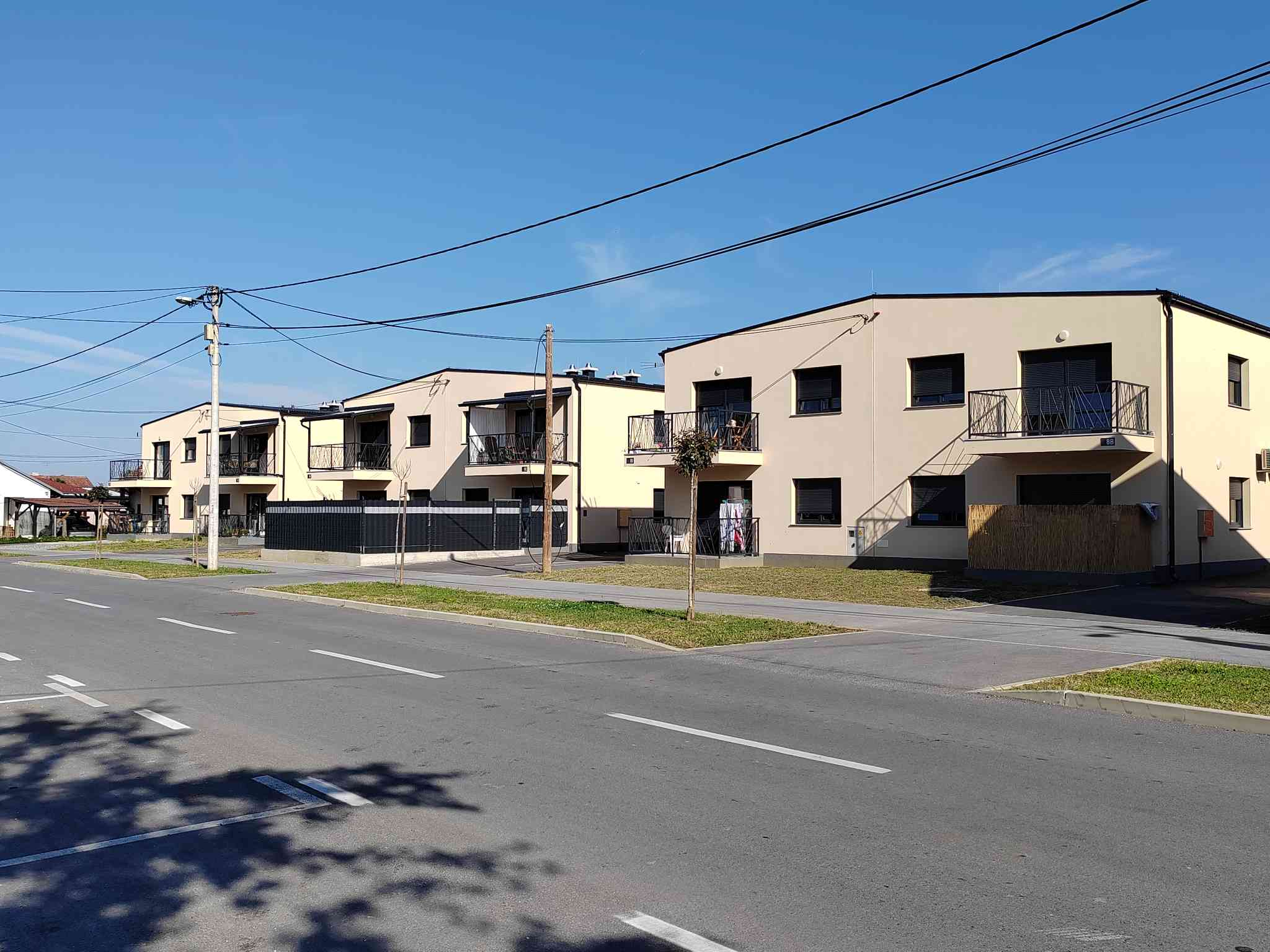
- Newly built residential buildings in Ivanovčanska Street.
- Interactive map of Ivanovčani
- Location of Ivanovčani in Croatia
- Coordinates: 45°54′58″N 16°51′08″E
- Country: Croatia
- Region: Croatia proper
- County: Bjelovar-Bilogora County
- Municipality: Bjelovar
- Time zone: UTC+1 (CET)
  - Summer (DST): UTC+2 (CEST)

Ivanovčani (Czech: Ivanovčany) are a neighborhood and former settlement in the northern part of the city of Bjelovar. They cover the area of the city along Petar Biškup-Veno Street and Andrija Hebrang Street with historical borders along Milan Šufflay and Eugen Kumičić Street, alongside bordering the settlement of Gornje Plavnice across the Jelinac stream.

Some of the more important buildings and monuments within Ivanovčani are the Monument to the Fallen in World War I and the old brickyard east of the Borik cemetery.

Ivanovčani are most notable for being the first documented site of mass Czech immigration to Croatia, as well as being the first Czech inhabited settlement in Croatia overall.

== History ==
In the recent past, Ivanovčani were a rural settlement in the Bjelovar area. They were established at the end of the Ottoman invasions and with the return of the Christian population in the 17th century. On the map of the Josephinian Land Survey in 1774, the settlement was listed as Dorf Ivanovchany. In a record published in Buda by János Lipszky in 1808, it was listed as Ivanovchani.

In 1776, the creation and construction of a new suburban district in Ivanovčani, known as Novi Ivanovčani (lit. New Ivanovčani) was recorded, which today encompasses the area of the Andrija Hebrang roundabout and Ivanovčanska Street, and the area of Andrija Hebrang Street from the roundabout to the intersection with the 55th Independent Battalion Street.

Novi Ivanovčani were built north of the former city limits of Bjelovar, at the entrance to the military training ground of Logor. And with the construction of the settlement, a small number of Austrians and Germans settled in Novi Ivanovčani with state support, however the settled population was completely Croatized within a few generations.

=== Arrival of the Czechs ===
In 1792, the first known mass immigration of Czechs to the area of Bjelovar and modern Bjelovar-Bilogora County took place with the immigration of 14 Czech families from Police nad Metují to Ivanovčani. According to some sources, Ivanovčani was then recorded as Pagus Bohemicus, Latin for Czech village.

=== Abolition of the Military Frontier ===
With the abolition of the Military Frontier and the establishment of the new administrative division in 1886, Ivanovčani became part of the Veliko Trojstvo municipality.

On July 1st 1900, the settlement of Ivanovčani were separated from the municipality of Veliko Trojstvo and administratively merged with the City of Bjelovar, making them the first settlement within the administrative makeup of Bjelovar, outside of Bjelovar itself.

=== 20th century ===
On August 18th 1916, on the birthday of emperor Franz Joseph I, the so-called Kings Monument in Ivanovčani was erected at the entrance to the military training ground of Logor. The monument consisted of the same stone base pyramid as today, on which a bronze bust of the emperor was placed.

At the foot of the monument was an inscription in German stating: "In unwandelbarer Treue und unbegrenzter Liebe die allzeit getruen Warasdiner 18. VIII.1916." (translated: With unwavering loyalty and boundless love, the ever-faithful Varasdiners, 18 August 1916 18.)

The Kings monument was jointly repurposed by the residents of Ivanovčani on September 3rd 1922 into the current Monument to the Fallen in World War I, in honour for the thirteen soldiers from Ivanovčani who died in the war.

In 1958, the residents of the settlement of Ivanovčani requested the full annexation of Ivanovčani into Bjelovar as the then administrative "Blok 18", alongside with Kraševo naselje (also known as Mali Logor), which was later approved.

== Gallery ==
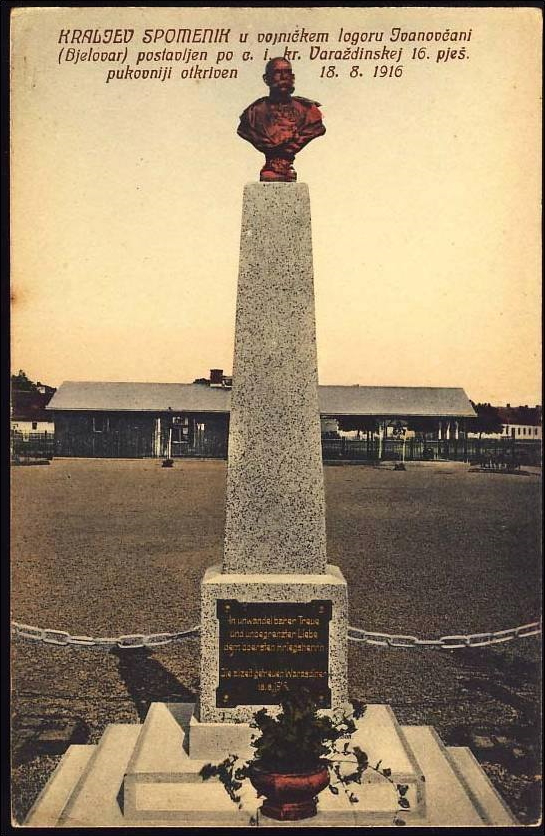
The Kings monument in Ivanovčani, prior to its repurposing

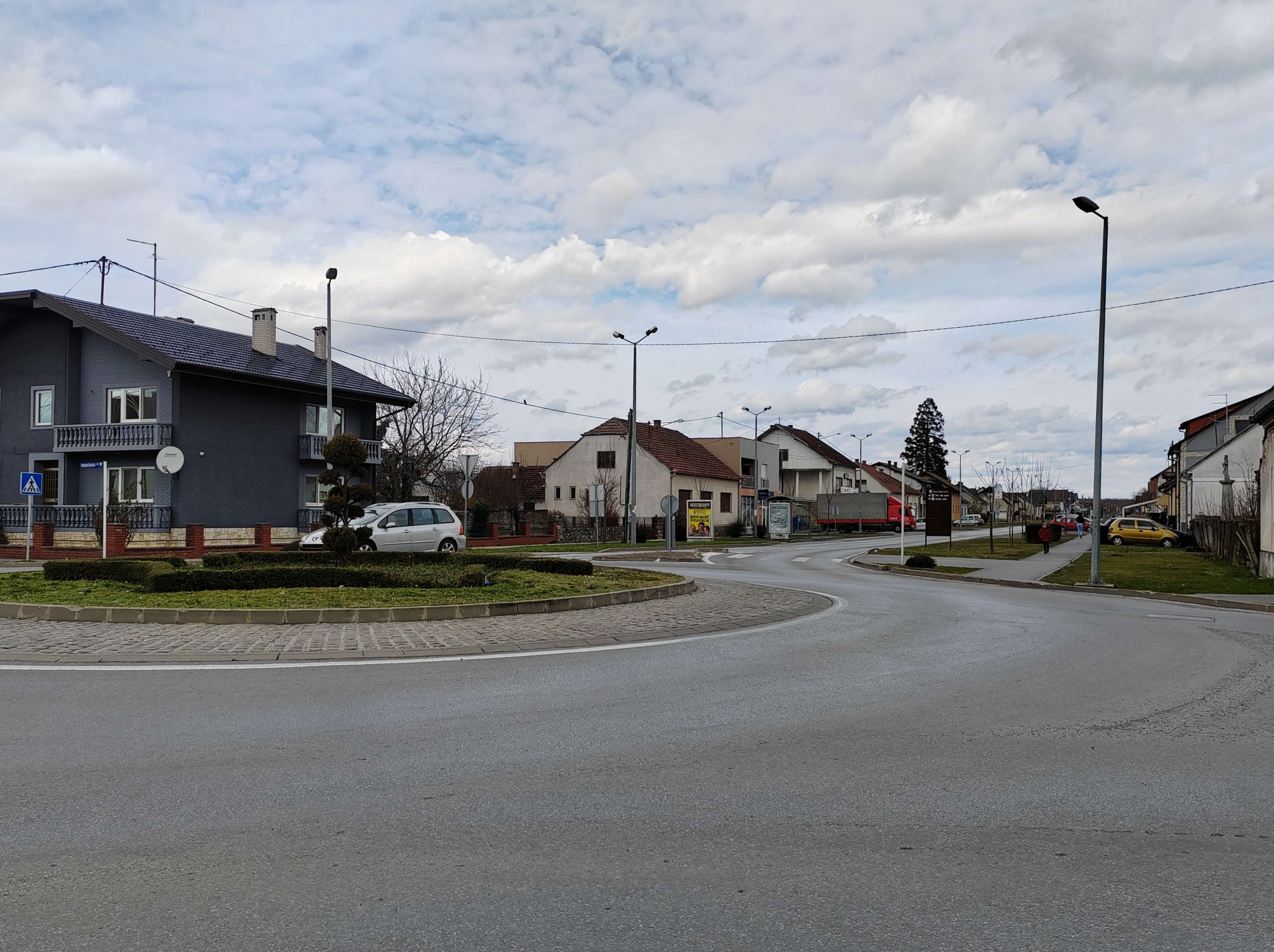
Andrija Hebrang Street

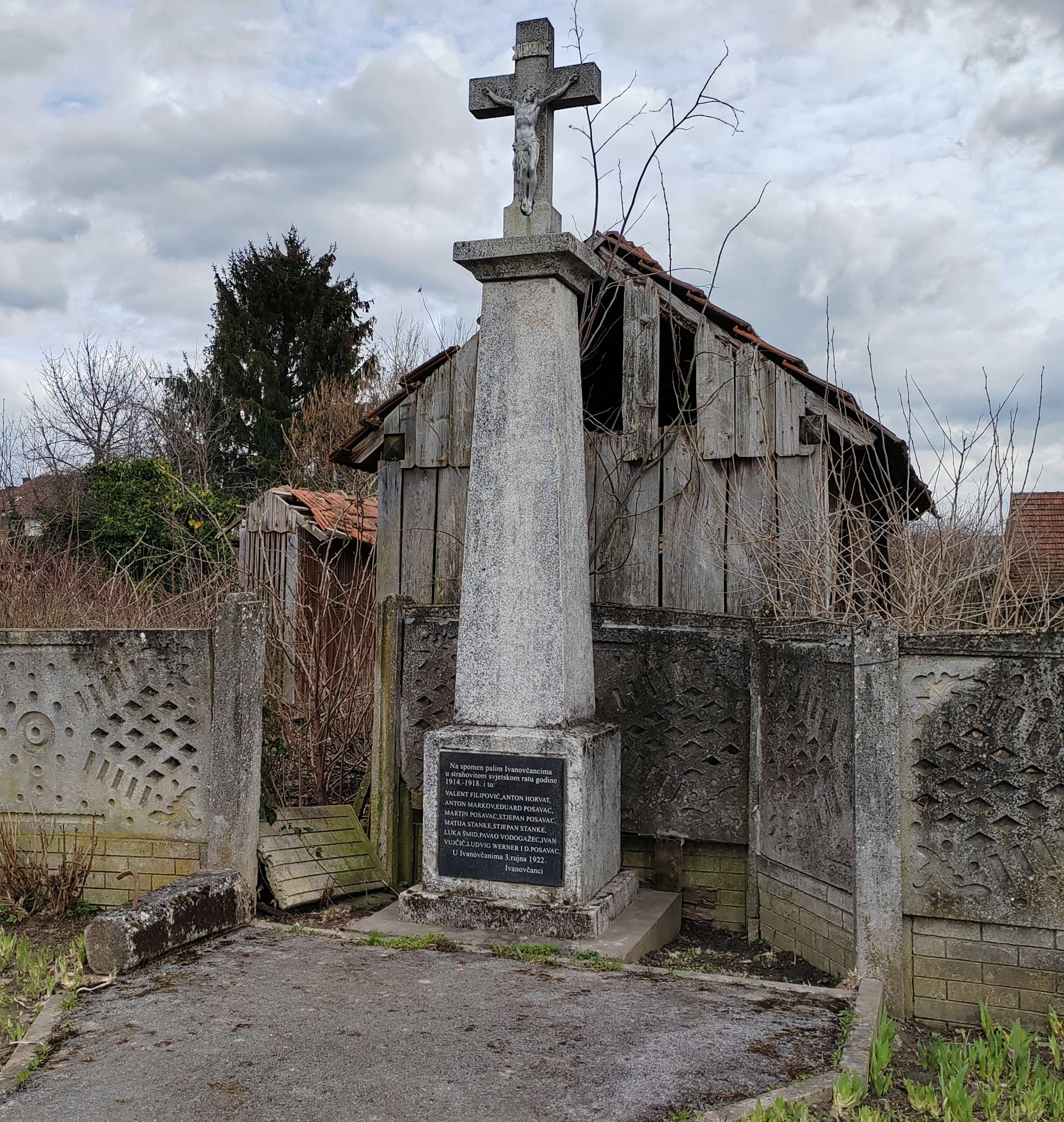
Monument to the Fallen in World War I

== People ==
- Kamilo Dočkal, Croatian Catholic priest of Czech origin, canon, church and cultural historian, cultural activist and violinist, spent his childhood in Ivanovčani,
- Antun Šimčik, Philologist, archivist, librarian, lexicographer, linguist, Slavicist, Croatist, Latinist, Romance scholar, translator, ethnographer, journalist and writer of Czech origin

== See also ==
- Czechs of Croatia
- Ivanovo Selo
