= Tomislav Ivančić =

Croatian theologian and academic

Tomislav Ivančić (30 November 1938 – 17 February 2017) was a Croatian Catholic theologian and academic.

== Biography ==
Ivančić was born in Davor. After the study of philosophy and theology in Zagreb and Rome he was ordained priest of the Zagreb Archdiocese in 1966. After achieving a doctorate at the Papal Gregorian University in Rome, he returned to Zagreb to become professor at the Catholic-Theological Faculty of the University of Zagreb. He was head of the Chair of Fundamental Theology, one of the editors of the magazine “Bogoslovska smotra” (Theogian's Review), member of the editorial boards and associate of many Croatian and foreign theology magazines and member of the Croatian Literary Translators’ Association. Since 1983 he was canon of Zagreb's Cathedral Chapter.

The areas of his scientific work are philosophy, theology and literature. The area of his special interest is the research of men's existential-spiritual dimension, in which he was discovering new possibilities and ways of modern evangelisation and the need of developing spiritual medicine, which - next to somatic and psychiatric medicine - is indispensable in the holistic healing of man, and especially in healing spiritual illnesses and addictions. For this purpose he developed the method of hagiotherapy and founded the Centre for Spiritual Help in 1990 in Zagreb, which he was the head of.

Apart from working at the Faculty, since 1971 Tomislav was also a religious teacher for students in Zagreb, the initiator of the prayer movement in the Church in Croatia, founder of the religious community “Prayer and Word” (Zajednica “Molitva i Riječ”) and the “Centre for a Better World”, as well as lecturer at numerous seminars for the spiritual renewal in Croatia and abroad. In the last decade he has been training persons to work in centres for spiritual help and hold seminars for the apostolate of evangelisation in Croatia and abroad. He has been credited for bringing Catholic Charismatic Renewal to Croatia by beginning seminars for spiritual renewal.

His scientific and expert articles are published in Croatian and foreign magazines. He wrote more than 50 books, of which almost the half was translated into foreign languages, whereas some have been published only in foreign languages. His book “Follow Me” (Pođi za mnom) was translated in 12 languages. He was editor-in-chief of the magazine “Steps” (Koraci), and then “New Steps” (Novi koraci), as well as founder of the magazine “Hagiotherapy” (Hagioterapija).

From 1998 until 2001 he was dean of the Catholic Theological Faculty of the University of Zagreb. In September 2001 he was elected rector of the University of Zagreb, but he resigned in December 2001, due to illness. On 9 February 2004 Pope John Paul II designated him member of the International Theological Commission, presided over by the Prefect of the Congregation for the Doctrine of the Faith, Joseph Cardinal Ratzinger, after Pope Benedict XVI.

Ivančić died in Zagreb on 17 February 2017.
