= Bernard Ménétrel =

French physician (1906–1947)

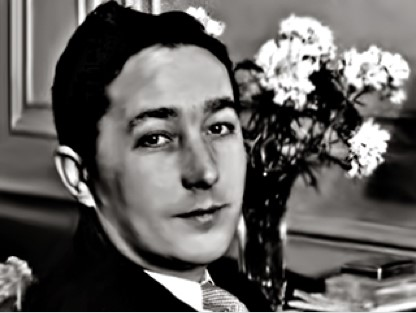
- Born: 22 June 1906; Paris, France
- Died: 31 March 1947 (aged 40); Mallemort, Bouches-du-Rhône, France
- Occupations: Physician, advisor
- Spouse: Aline Montcocol
- Parent: Louis Ménétrel
- Relatives: Célestin Montcocol (father-in-law)

Bernard Ménétrel (French pronunciation: [bɛʁnaʁ menetʁɛl]; 22 June 1906 – 31 March 1947) was a French physician and political advisor to Marshal Philippe Pétain during World War II. He met with Helmut Knochen and tried to negotiate with Charles de Gaulle on Pétain's behalf.

== Early life ==
Bernard Ménétrel was born on 22 June 1906. His father, Louis, was the physician and personal friend of Philippe Pétain.

== Career ==
Like his father, Ménétrel became the physician and advisor to Marshal Philippe Pétain. In 1942 Ménétrel was named on a list of French collaborators with Germany to be killed during the war, or tried after it. According to renowned American political scientist Raul Hilberg in The Destruction of the European Jews, on June 18, 1943, Ménétrel met Helmut Knochen, the senior commander of the Sicherheitspolizei (Security Police) and Sicherheitsdienst (Intelligence) in Paris. He told him Pétain agreed to keep French Jews from having access to good jobs. He added that he agreed with the Nazis' monstrous goal of ridding Europe of the Jews "forever". According to Annie Pétain, Philippe Pétain's wife, Ménétrel was one of the biggest antisemites in Pétain's inner circle.

In July 1942, Ménétrel and Paul Racine, Pétain's personal secretary, appreciated the "good work" that François Mitterrand was doing for the Vichy government. (Mitterrand later served as the President of France from 1981 to 1995).

In 1944, Ménétrel was asked by Pétain to contact General Charles de Gaulle and attempt to negotiate with him, to no avail.

Ménétrel made a point to portray Pétain as a weak man manipulated by Pierre Laval.

== Personal life ==
He was married to Aline Montcocol, the daughter of businessman Célestin Montcocol. Philippe Pétain was his best man. They resided on the Avenue Montaigne in the 8th arrondissement of Paris.

== Death ==
Ménétrel died in a car crash on 31 March 1947, after falling asleep at the wheel.
