= Nový Přerov =

- Municipality
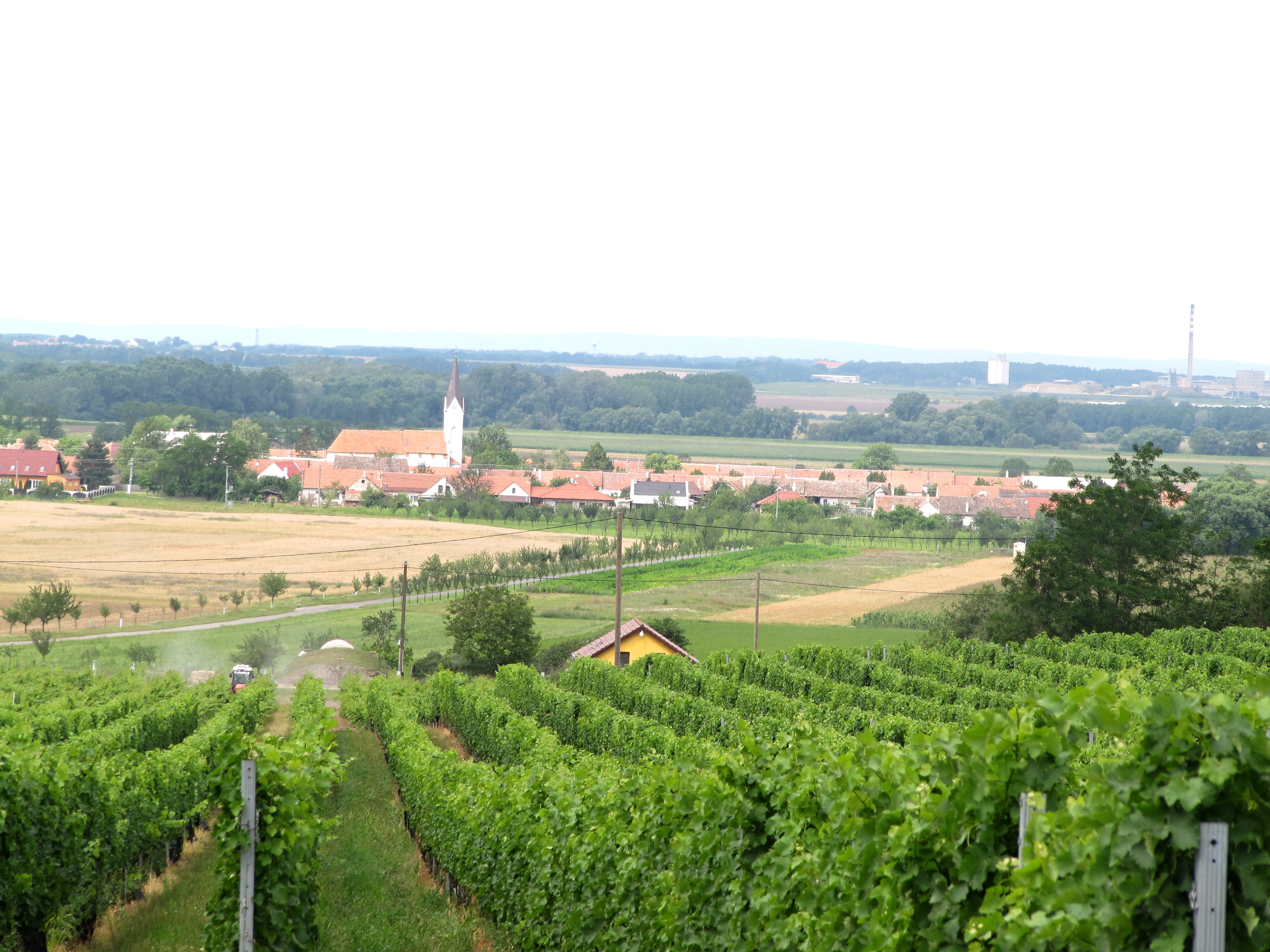
- General view

- Flag Coat of arms

- Location in the Czech Republic
- Coordinates: 48°48′35″N 16°29′37″E
- Country: Czech Republic
- Region: South Moravian
- District: Břeclav
- First mentioned: 1350

Area
  - Total: 6.14 km^{2} (2.37 sq mi)
- Elevation: 180 m (590 ft)

Population (2026-01-01)
  - Total: 369
  - Density: 60.1/km^{2} (156/sq mi)
- Time zone: UTC+1 (CET)
  - Summer (DST): UTC+2 (CEST)
- Postal code: 691 81
- Website: www.novyprerov.cz

Nový Přerov (German: Neuprerau, Neu-Prerau, Croatian: Nova Prerava) is a municipality and village in Břeclav District in the South Moravian Region of the Czech Republic. It has about 400 inhabitants.

Nový Přerov lies approximately 29 kilometres (18 mi) west of Břeclav, 45 km (28 mi) south of Brno, and 207 km (129 mi) south-east of Prague.

== Demographics ==
Nový Přerov one of the three South Moravian municipalities with a historical population of Moravian Croats.

Historical population
Year	Pop.	±%
1869	615	—
1880	673	+9.4%
1890	711	+5.6%
1900	781	+9.8%
1910	829	+6.1%
1921	878	+5.9%
1930	880	+0.2%
1950	510	−42.0%
1961	452	−11.4%
1970	443	−2.0%
1980	344	−22.3%
1991	310	−9.9%
2001	321	+3.5%
2011	299	−6.9%
2021	343	+14.7%
Source: Censuses
