= Christian Evidence Society =

British Christian organisation

The Christian Evidence Society is a British Christian apologetics organisation that was founded in 1870. At its financial peak in 1883, it had slightly over 400 paying members, but that it had declined to below 300 by 1897. After 1900, its focus shifted from defending against external attacks to addressing doubts from within Christianity.

== Formation ==
The society was founded to counter atheism in Victorian society. Its original purpose was described by a contemporaneous source as "meeting, in fair argument, the current scepticism". Its original methods were, in the words of this source:

1. Lectures for the educated
2. Classes aimed at the "lower grades of society, to save them from infidelity"
3. Circulation of tracts, and offering prizes for engaging in private study followed by competitive examination.

Its membership consisted of evangelical and moderate churchmen, including Richard Whately, Archbishop of Dublin and Charles Dickison, Bishop of Meath, as well as prominent scientists, including John Hall Gladstone and William Henry Dallinger.

== See also ==
- Christian apologetics
