= Celestina =

Celestina may refer to:

- Celestina (novel), a 1791 novel by Charlotte Smith

== People ==
- Celestina Aladekoba, American dancer and choreographer
- Celestina Boninsegna (1877–1947), Italian operatic soprano
- Celestina Bottego (1895–1980), American-born Italian Roman Catholic nun
- Celestina Casapietra (1938–2024), Italian operatic soprano
- Celestina Cordero (1787–1862), Puerto Rican educator
- Celestina Dias (1858–1933), Ceylonese philanthropist and businesswoman
- Celestina Manga (born 2002), Equatoguinean footballer
- Celestina Onyeka (born 1984), Nigerian footballer
- Celestina Popa (born 1970), Romanian artistic gymnast
- Celestina Sommer (1827–1859), English murderer

== See also ==
- Celestinas Jucys (born 1939), Soviet rower
- Celestine (disambiguation)
- La Celestina (disambiguation)
