= Kamilo Dočkal =

Kamilo Dočkal (30 December 1879 – 7 August 1963) was a Croatian church and art historian, cultural worker and a violinist.

== Life ==
Dočkal was born in Brodek u Přerova in present-day Czech Republic. As a five-year-old he moved with his parent to Ivanovčani near Bjelovar. He finished gymnasium and theology studies in Zagreb. In 1902, he became a Catholic priest. He continued to study philosophy and theology in Vienna at the Higher Scientific Institute for Diocesan Priests at St. Augustine's, earning a PhD in theology in 1906.

He worked as a catechist in real gymnasium in Zagreb between 1906 and 1914. Later, he served as a secretary to Archbishop Anton Bauer and as a master of sciences at the Theological Seminary between 1914 and 1920. In 1920 he became a rector of the same seminary, serving until 1935. At the Catholic Faculty of Theology in Zagreb, he taught Church history between 1915 and 1919, and then pastoral theology, homiletics, and catechetics between 1919 and 1921.

In 1920, Dočkal became a canon. He participated in the Union of the Catholic Clergy and its congresses in Velehrad. He wrote several books and held discussions in which he highlighted the efforts and results of Christian unity. Dočkal also collected paintings, statues, and Church clothes within the Archdiocese of Zagreb. Of the arts he collected, he formed an independent collection and, in 1939, founded the Diocesan Museum, becoming its first director. For more than a decade, Dočkal researched the history of Paulines in Croatia. He collected Material for the history of the Pauline monasteries in Croatia (a manuscript kept in the Archives of the Croatian Academy of Sciences and Arts). He also researched the history of Croatian institutes in Bologna (Collegium hungarico-illyricum an. 1553. Bononiae fundatum) and Vienna (Collegium Croaticum Viennae an. 1627. fundatum). Dočkal also wrote for several journals: Katolički list, Mladost, Ćirilometodski vjesnik, Bogoslovska smotra, and Život.

Dočkal was also a musician, a violinist. He was a member of the Social Orchestra of the Croatian Music Institute and, as of 1929, of its directorate. He was also a chamber musician. He served as president of the Croatian Catholic Casino, where he founded a string orchestra. Dočkal wrote musical reviews for journals Hrvatska, Novine, Hrvatska straža, and Sveta Cecilija.

== Published works ==
=== Church history ===
- Dočkal, Kamilo (1937). Povijest perzijske ili kaldejske crkve [The history of the Persian or Chaldean Church] (in Croatian). Zagreb.
- Dočkal, Kamilo (1938). Povijest indijske crkve [The history of the Indian Church] (in Croatian). Zagreb.
- Dočkal, Kamilo (1939). Povijest sirske crkve [The history of the Syriac Church] (in Croatian). Zagreb.
- Dočkal, Kamilo (1940). Diecezanski muzej Nadbiskupije zagrebačke [The Diocesan Museum of the Archdiocese of Zagreb] (in Croatian). Vol. 1. Zagreb.
- Dočkal, Kamilo (1940). Povijest općeg crkvenog sabora u Ferrari i Fiorenci [The history of the general church council in Ferrara and Florence] (in Croatian). Zagreb.
- Dočkal, Kamilo (1941). Povijest armenske crkve [The history of the Armenian Church] (in Croatian). Zagreb.
- Dočkal, Kamilo (1942). Naša zvona i njihovi lijevaoci [Our bells and their founders] (in Croatian). Zagreb.
- Dočkal, Kamilo (1942). Povijest egipatske crkve [The history of the Egyptian Church] (in Croatian). Zagreb.
- Dočkal, Kamilo (1944). Diecezanski muzej Nadbiskupije zagrebačke [The Diocesan Museum of the Archdiocese of Zagreb] (in Croatian). Vol. 2. Zagreb.

=== Music ===
- Dočkal, Kamilo (1939). Duhovne pjesme za svečane nastupe u katoličkim udruženjima [Spiritual songs for ceremonial performance in the Catholic societies] (in Croatian). Zagreb.
- Dočkal, Kamilo (1941). Duhovne pjesme za svečane nastupe katoličkih udruženja [Spiritual songs for ceremonial performance of the Catholic societies] (in Croatian). Zagreb.
