= Celestinas Jucys =

Soviet rower

Personal information
- Born: 18 January 1939 (age 86); Klausgalvų Medsėdžiai, Klaipėda, Lithuania
- Height: 187 cm (6 ft 2 in)
- Weight: 83 kg (183 lb)

Sport
- Sport: Rowing

Celestinas Jucys (born 18 January 1939) is a Lithuanian rower. He competed at the 1964 Summer Olympics in Tokyo with the men's coxed four where they came seventh.
