= Celestin (surname) =

Celestin is a surname of French origin. Notable people with the surname include:

- Amir Celestin (born 1990), American basketball player
- Fourel Célestin, Haitian politician
- Josaphat Celestin (born 1956), Haitian-American politician
- Jude Célestin (born 1962), Haitian politician
- Martial Célestin (1913–2011), first Prime Minister of Haiti
- Oliver Celestin (born 1981), American football safety
- Papa Celestin (1884–1954), American bandleader
