= Augustinović =

Augustinović, sometimes spelled Augustinovič, Augusztinovics or Agustinović, is a surname. Notable people with the surname include:

- Augustin Augustinović (1917–1998), Croatian Franciscan priest
- Đuro Augustinović (1816–1870), Croatian doctor and philologist
- Mária Augusztinovics (1930–2014), Hungarian macroeconomist
