= Saint-Célestin =

Saint-Célestin may refer to:

- Saint-Célestin, Quebec (municipality), a municipality in the Centre-du-Québec region of Quebec
- Saint-Célestin, Quebec (village), a village municipality enclaved within the municipality

== See also ==
- Pope Celestine I, a saint
- Pope Celestine V, a saint
