= Célestin Montcocol =

French businessman (1879–1981)

- Born: 26 June 1879; Avignon, France
- Died: 27 December 1981 (aged 102)
- Occupation: Businessman
- Spouse: Emma Labour
- Children: 2 daughters, including Aline Ménétrel
- Relatives: Bernard Ménétrel (son-in-law)

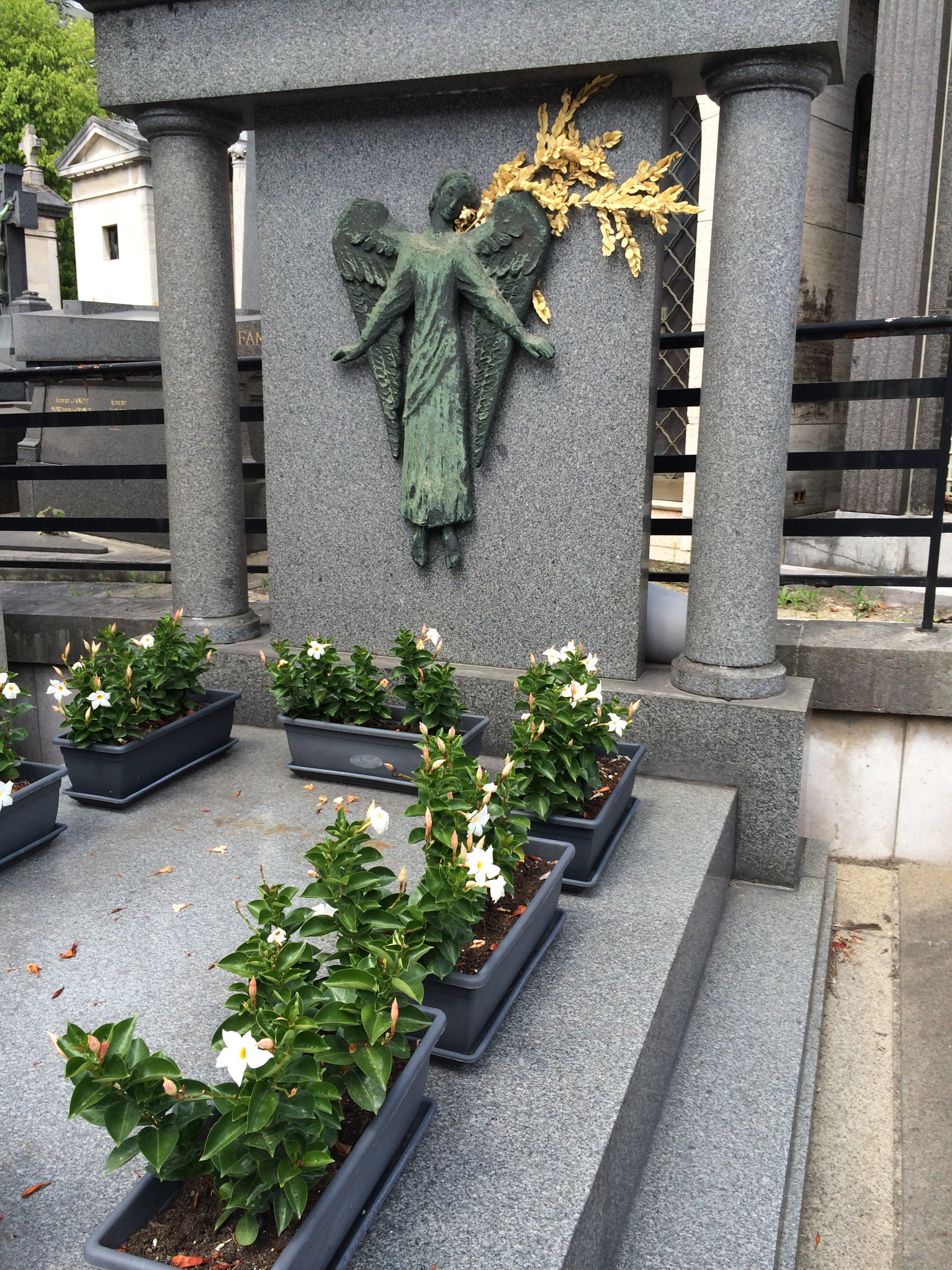
Grave of Célestin Montcocol in the cimetery of Passy, Paris 16e (France)

Célestin Montcocol (French pronunciation: [selɛstɛ̃ mɔ̃kɔkɔl]; 26 June 1879 – 27 December 1981) was a French businessman. He built underground constructions and railroad tracks, including some of the Paris Métro. He is a co-founder of the Sainte-Maxime Golf Club.

== Early life ==
Montcocol was born on 26 June 1879 in Avignon. He graduated from the École nationale des arts et métiers in Aix-en-Provence in 1898.

== Career ==
Montcocol started his career at the Compagnie du chemin de fer métropolitain de Paris. He then joined his father-in-law's construction company. He received a gold medal at the 1908 Franco-British Exhibition for his work.

When his father-in-law died in 1912, he became its sole owner. In the 1920s and 1930s, his firm was one of the top three largest construction firms building the Paris Métro. He also built the sewage system and buildings in Marseille, Saint-Germain-en-Laye, and Antibes. Additionally, he built railroad tracks for the SNCF.

He acquired sixty-six hectares in Sainte-Maxime in 1933, with the aim of developing the land. It became the Sainte-Maxime Golf Club thanks to his grandson, Thierry Ménétrel, in 1991.

His firm was inactive during World War II. In 1943, he was a co-founder of the Ecole d'Application aux Métiers des Travaux Publics in Egletons. After the war, he revived his construction firm. He built the Sainte-Dévote Tunnel in Monaco. He also built subways in Montréal, Mexico, Santiago and Caracas.

He was a Knight of the Legion of Honour in 1934, and an Officer in 1951.

== Personal life ==
He married Emma Labour, the daughter of Victor Labour, a businessman in the construction industry. They had two daughters. One of them, Aline, married Bernard Ménétrel, the physician and advisor to Marshal Philippe Pétain during World War II.

== Death ==
He died on 27 December 1981. He was 102 years old.
