= Nazzareno Celestini =

Italian footballer (1914–2001)

Personal information
- Date of birth: April 14, 1914
- Place of birth: Rome, Italy
- Date of death: June 7, 2001 (aged 87)
- Place of death: Rome, Italy
- Position: Midfielder

Senior career*
Years	Team	Apps	(Gls)
1931–1932	Roma	1	(0)
1932–1933	Roma (B team)		
1933–1936	Roma	2	(0)
1936–1943	M.A.T.E.R.		
1943–1944	Tirrenia Roma	13	(2)
- * Club domestic league appearances and goals

Nazzareno Celestini (April 14, 1914 – June 7, 2001) was an Italian footballer who played as a midfielder.

He played 3 games in 3 seasons in the Serie A for A.S. Roma.

== Career ==
Born into football at Roma, where he played from 1931 to 1937, he struggled to find space in the team, serving as a reserve for the starter Fasanelli and making 3 appearances.

== Honors ==
=== National competitions ===
Serie C: 1938-1939, 1939-1940, 1941-1942
