= Czech Republic and the European Union =

Czech Republic–European Union relations
- Czech Republic: European Union

The Czech Republic has been a member state of the European Union since the 2004 enlargement of the European Union. It is not a member of the eurozone. The Czech Republic has held the rotating presidency of the Council of the European Union twice, in 2009 and 2022.

== Czechia's foreign relations with EU member states ==
- Austria
- Belgium
- Bulgaria
- Croatia
- Cyprus
- Denmark
- Estonia
- Finland
- France
- Germany
- Greece
- Hungary
- (Republic of Ireland) Ireland
- Italy
- Latvia
- Lithuania
- Luxembourg
- Malta
- Netherlands
- Poland
- Portugal
- Romania
- Slovakia
- Slovenia
- Spain
- Sweden

== See also ==
- Euroscepticism in the Czech Republic
- Czech Republic and the euro
- 2003 Czech European Union membership referendum
- 2004 European Parliament election in the Czech Republic
- 2009 European Parliament election in the Czech Republic
- 2009 Czech Presidency of the Council of the European Union
- 2014 European Parliament election in the Czech Republic
- 2019 European Parliament election in the Czech Republic
- 2022 Czech Presidency of the Council of the European Union
- 2024 European Parliament election in the Czech Republic
