= Czechoslovakia–Iran relations =

- Czechoslovakia: Iran

Czechoslovakia and Iran signed a treaty of friendship on 29 October 1930.

On 22 June 1925, the Iranian ambassador to Italy was appointed Iran's diplomatic representative for Czechoslovakia.

In August 1962, the Czechoslovak diplomatic mission in Tehran was upgraded to an embassy.

In September 1963, Alinaghi Alikhani, the Iranian Minister of the Economy, travelled to Czechoslovakia. The first state visit by Shah Mohammad Reza Pahlavi and his wife Farah to Czechoslovakia was in May 1967.

Both countries underwent periods of liberalization and openness in the 1960s, with Czechoslovakia’s Prague Spring and Iran’s White Revolution. During the early 1970s, Czechoslovakia pursued a foreign policy strategy focused on maintaining and deepening its bilateral relations with Iran. While official visits and economic cooperation were generally regarded as successful, there were moments of tension in the bilateral relations during the early 1970s. Both countries made significant progress in economic and diplomatic initiatives, which was unusual for most communist countries at the time. However, the Iranian Revolution which brought the Ayatollahs to power saw the end of Iranian-Czechoslovak relations.

== See also ==
- Czech Republic–Iran relations
- Foreign relations of Slovakia
- Foreign relations of Iran
- Foreign relations of the Czech Republic

== Sources ==
- Jůnová Macková, Adéla (2012). Czechoslovak-Iranian relations 1918-1938. Politics, economy, culture, expatriates and communities (PhD thesis) (in Czech). Univerzita Karlova. hdl:20.500.11956/45179.
- Nováková, Klára (2014). The Czechoslovakia-Iranian Relationships: Political and cultural relationships between 1953 and 1979 (PhD thesis) (in Czech). Univerzita Karlova. hdl:20.500.11956/62914.
- Taterová, Eva; Struhárová, Alexandra (2024). "Czechoslovak-Iranian Relations in 1968–1978: Cooperation Across the Cold War Barriers". Asian and African Studies. 33 (1). Slovak Academic Press: 117–139. doi:10.31577/aassav.2024.33.1.05. This article incorporates text from this source, which is available under the CC BY 4.0 license.
