= Czech Republic–Philippines relations =

- Czech Republic: Philippines

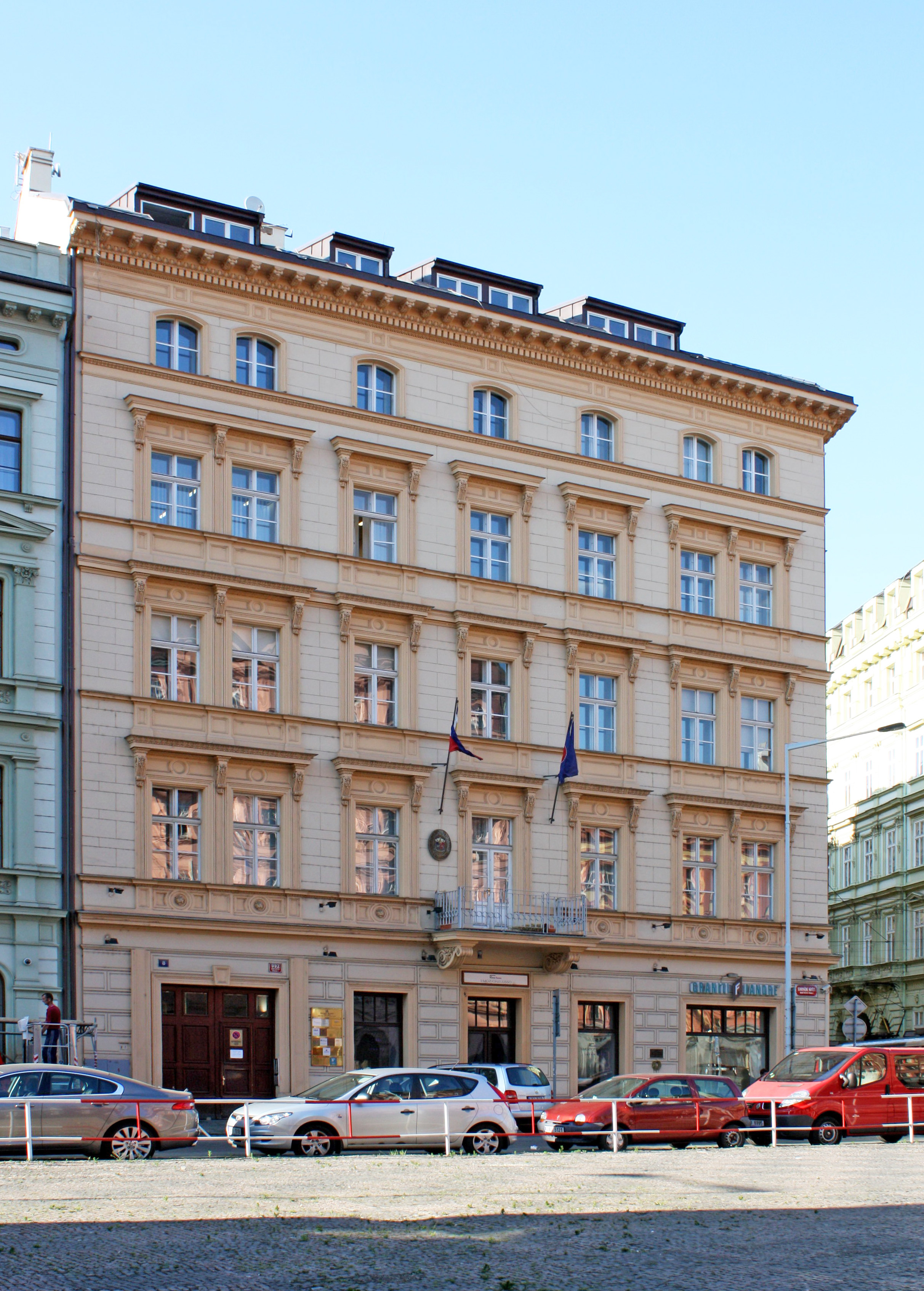
Philippine embassy in Prague

Czech Republic–Philippines relations are the bilateral relations between the Czech Republic and the Philippines. The Czech Republic has an embassy in Manila and the Philippines has an embassy in Prague.

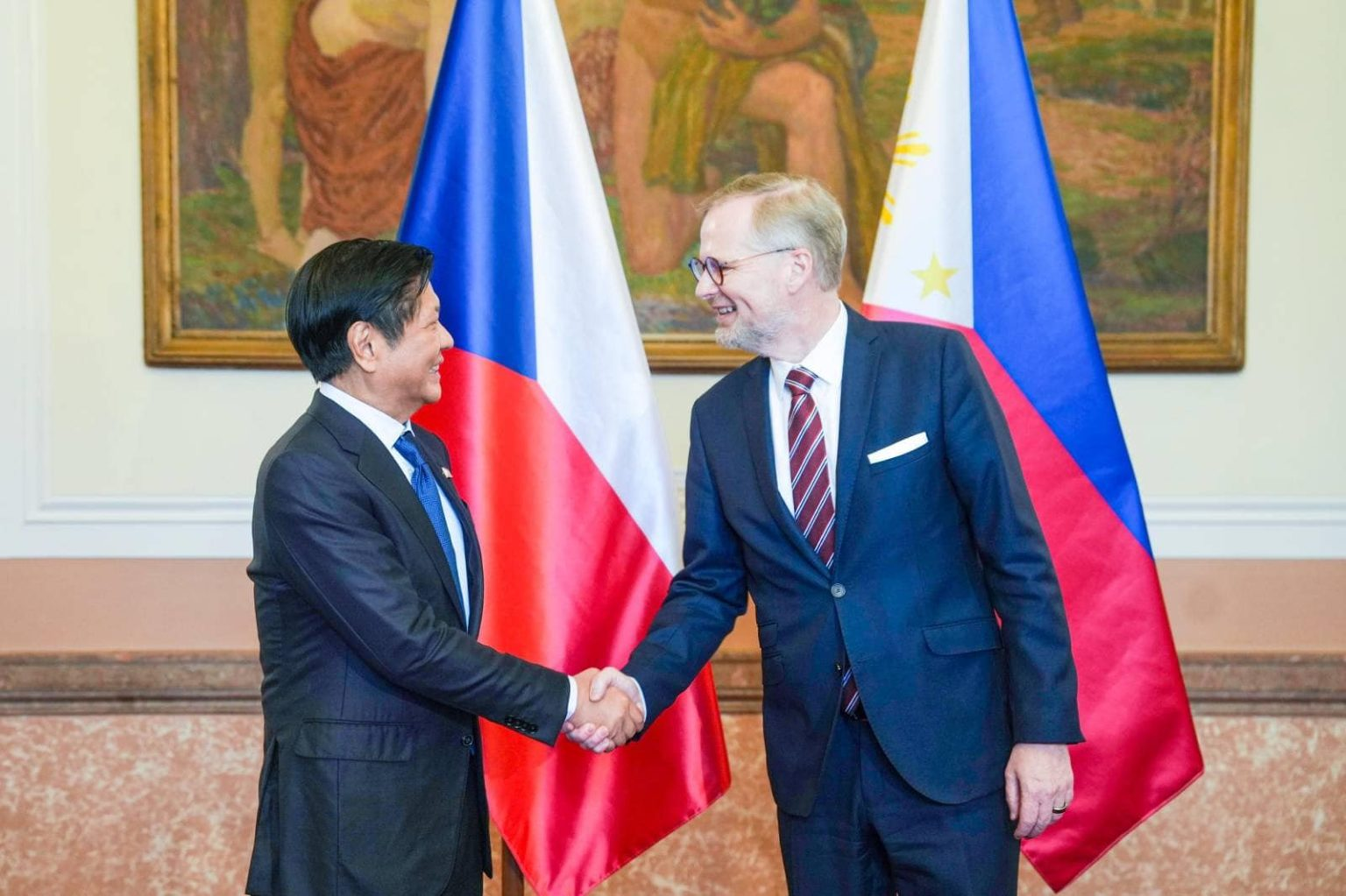
President Bongbong Marcos meets with Prime Minister Petr Fiala at Buckingham Palace during the former's official visit in Prague, 15 March 2024

== Relations ==
The Philippines signed the Agreement on Cooperation in the Fields of Culture, Education, Science and Sports in 2013. The Czech Republic had a profound impact on Filipinos as the nationalist, writer and national hero José Rizal had a deep friendship with Austrian-Czech anthropologist Ferdinand Blumentritt. Deputy Prime Minister Karel Schwarzenberg visited Manila as both countries prepared to commemorate the 40th anniversary of their formal bilateral relations in 2013.

== Economic relations ==
The Czech Republic is the Philippines' 24th largest export market and the 8th biggest in European bilateral trade, amounting to $300 million from January to November 2011.

== Resident diplomatic missions ==
- The Czech Republic has an embassy in Manila.
- The Philippines has an embassy in Prague.

== See also ==
- Foreign relations of the Czech Republic
- Foreign relations of the Philippines
