= Czech Republic–Kazakhstan relations =

- Czech Republic: Kazakhstan

Czech Republic–Kazakhstan relations are bilateral relations between the Czech Republic and Kazakhstan.

== History ==
Following World War II, both countries were under Soviet rule with the Czech Republic part of the Czechoslovak Socialist Republic as a satellite state and Kazakhstan as one of the constituent republics of the Soviet Union

Modern diplomatic relations between the Kazakhstan and the Czech Republic were established on January 1, 1993. In 2012, Kazakh president Nursultan Nazarbayev met Czech president Václav Klaus during an official visit to the Czech Republic and Austria, and discussed deepening of economic cooperation. In 2014, Nazarbayev met president Miloš Zeman, discussing further economic cooperation of the countries and Czech assistance to diversifying of Kazakhstan's economy.

== Trade and economy ==
Economic cooperation between the Czech Republic and Kazakhstan is based on several bilateral agreements between the countries from 1996, 1998 and 2004. The bilateral trade turnover has grown from $200 in 2009 to $1.2 billion in 2014. Due to negative outcomes of the global economic crisis and falling oil prices, the trade volume dropped to $666 million in 2015. In 2015, most trade by Czech firms were in the fields of hi-tech engineering, instrumentation, agriculture and film industry.

== Diplomatic missions ==
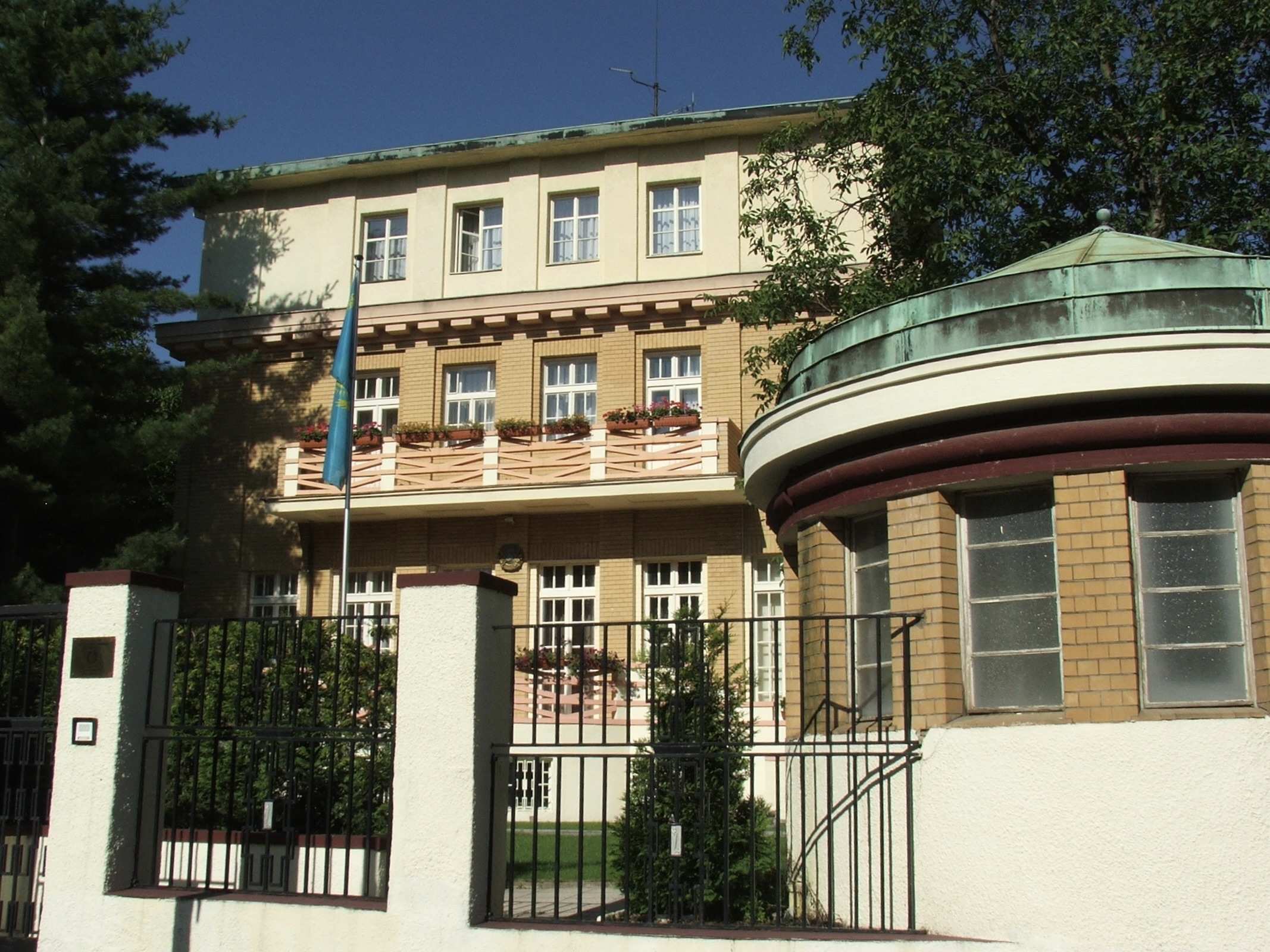
Kazakh Embassy in Prague

- The Czech Republic has an embassy in Astana and a branch office of the embassy in Almaty.
- Kazakhstan has an embassy in Prague and an honorary consulate in Jaroměř.

== Czech Ambassadors to Kazakhstan ==
- (Embassy since December 1994)
1. (VPD) Alexandr Langer 1995-1999
2. (VPD) Miroslav Andr 1999–2002
3. Milan Sedláček (Milan Sedláček) 2003-2007
4. Bedřich Kopecký (Bedřich Kopecký) 2008 – at least 2013, if not 2014
5. Eliška Zhigova (Eliška Žigová) 2014–2018
6. Rudolf Hykl (Rudolf Hykl) 2019–

== See also ==
- Foreign relations of the Czech Republic
- Foreign relations of Kazakhstan
- List of diplomatic missions of the Czech Republic
- List of diplomatic missions of Kazakhstan
