= Foreign relations of the Czech Republic =

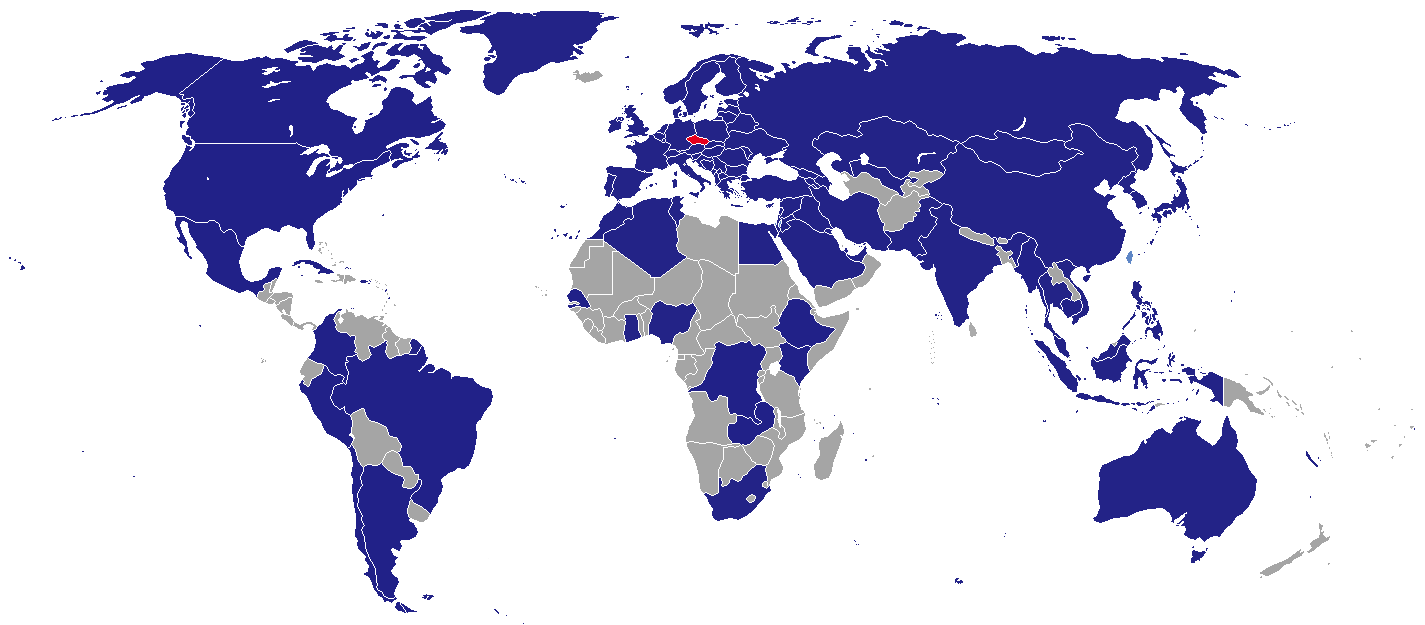
Embassies (not consulates) of the Czech Republic in the world.

The Czech Republic is a Central European country, a member of the European Union, the Organisation for Economic Co-operation and Development (OECD), Organization for Security and Co-operation in Europe (OSCE), the North Atlantic Treaty Organization (NATO), the United Nations (and all of its main specialized agencies and boards). It entertains diplomatic relations with 191 countries of the world, around half of which maintain a resident embassy in the Czech capital city, Prague.

During the years 1948–1989, the foreign policy of Czechoslovakia had followed that of the Soviet Union. Since the revolution and the subsequent mutually-agreed peaceful dissolution of Czechoslovakia into the Czech Republic and Slovakia, the Czechs have made reintegration with Western institutions their chief foreign policy objective. This goal was rapidly met with great success, as the nation joined NATO in 1999 and the European Union in 2004, and held the Presidency of the European Union during the first half of 2009.

== International disputes ==
=== Liechtenstein ===
Throughout the past decades, Liechtenstein continuously claimed restitution for 1,600 km^{2} (620 sq mi), or an area roughly ten times the size of Liechtenstein, of land currently located in the Czech Republic. The land was partially confiscated from the Liechtenstein family in 1918 with the rest of the property being confiscated in 1945 after the expulsion of Germans and confiscation of German property. The Czech Republic insisted that it could not acknowledge or be responsible for claims going back to before February 1948, when the Communists had seized power.

As a result, Liechtenstein did not diplomatically recognize the existence of the Czech Republic as a new state (and, for that matter, also that of the Slovak Republic) until 2009.

In July 2009, the Prince of Liechtenstein announced he was resigning to the previous unsuccessful claims to property located in the Czech Republic, and on 13 July 2009, after politically recognizing one another, the Czech Republic and Liechtenstein formally established diplomatic relations.

== Placement of US National Missile Defense base ==
In February 2007, the US started formal negotiations with Czech Republic and Poland concerning construction of missile shield installations in those countries for a Ground-based Midcourse Defense System. Government of the Czech Republic agrees (while 67% Czechs disagree and only about 22% support it) to host a missile defense radar on its territory while a base of missile interceptors is supposed to be built in Poland. The objective is reportedly to protect another parts of US National Missile Defense from long-range missile strikes from Iran and North Korea, but Czech PM Mirek Topolánek said the main reason is to avoid Russian influence and strengthen ties to US.

The main government supporter Alexandr Vondra, Deputy Prime Minister for European affairs, used to be an ambassador to the USA. More problematic is that between 2004 and 2006 he was an executive director of a lobbying company Dutko Worldwide Prague. Dutko's and its strategic partner AMI Communications (PR company) customers are Boeing, Lockheed Martin, Nortrop Grumman, which are largest contractors for NMD development. AMI Communications also received (without a formal selection procedure) a government contract to persuade Czechs to support US radar base.

== Diplomatic relations ==
List of countries which the Czech Republic maintains diplomatic relations with:

#	Country	Date
1	Italy	24 October 1918
2	United Kingdom	26 October 1918
3	France	17 November 1918
4	Serbia	9 January 1919
5	Belgium	3 June 1919
6	United States	11 June 1919
7	Spain	19 June 1919
8	Poland	21 June 1919
9	Switzerland	12 July 1919
10	Romania	1 September 1919
11	Netherlands	13 November 1919
12	Japan	12 January 1920
13	Austria	20 January 1920
—	Holy See	22 March 1920
14	Greece	25 May 1920
15	Brazil	June 1920
16	Denmark	4 September 1920
17	Bulgaria	27 September 1920
18	Portugal	18 October 1920
19	Sweden	20 November 1920
20	Cuba	23 November 1920
21	Norway	13 January 1921
22	Uruguay	16 August 1921
23	Finland	18 December 1921
24	Hungary	6 February 1922
25	Luxembourg	24 April 1922
26	Albania	5 July 1922
27	Peru	11 July 1922
28	Mexico	20 July 1922
29	Egypt	25 November 1922
30	Argentina	7 January 1924
31	Chile	19 July 1924
32	Turkey	11 October 1924
33	Iran	22 June 1925
34	Guatemala	27 February 1927
35	Panama	25 March 1929
36	Venezuela	15 February 1930
37	El Salvador	4 March 1930
38	Honduras	12 March 1930
39	Nicaragua	20 March 1930
40	Iraq	16 November 1933
41	Colombia	17 April 1934
42	Russia	9 June 1934
43	Bolivia	12 February 1935
44	Ecuador	12 March 1935
45	Costa Rica	21 March 1935
46	Paraguay	14 February 1936
47	Afghanistan	13 October 1937
48	Canada	5 November 1942
49	Dominican Republic	7 October 1943
50	Haiti	13 October 1943
51	Ethiopia	11 February 1944
52	Iceland	27 February 1946
53	Syria	20 September 1946
54	Lebanon	21 September 1946
55	Ireland	29 January 1947
56	India	18 November 1947
57	Israel	3 July 1948
58	North Korea	21 October 1948
59	China	6 October 1949
60	Indonesia	2 February 1950
61	Vietnam	2 February 1950
62	Mongolia	25 April 1950
63	Pakistan	27 September 1950
64	Myanmar	25 July 1955
65	Sudan	19 January 1956
66	Yemen	3 September 1956
67	Sri Lanka	11 September 1957
68	Guinea	14 February 1959
69	Morocco	8 July 1959
70	Tunisia	29 July 1959
71	Nepal	26 December 1959
72	Libya	16 May 1960
73	Democratic Republic of the Congo	30 June 1960
74	Mali	10 August 1960
75	Somalia	11 September 1960
76	Togo	2 December 1960
77	Cyprus	22 December 1960
78	Ghana	18 January 1961
79	Nigeria	25 October 1961
80	Tanzania	12 December 1961
81	Algeria	23 March 1962
82	Laos	5 September 1962
83	Uganda	11 October 1962
84	Sierra Leone	3 January 1963
85	Burundi	11 March 1963
86	Kuwait	27 May 1963
87	Benin	3 August 1963
88	Kenya	January 1964
89	Republic of the Congo	23 March 1964
90	Jordan	30 April 1964
91	Zambia	2 February 1965
92	Mauritania	9 March 1965
93	Rwanda	24 July 1965
94	Chad	5 February 1967
95	Senegal	28 December 1967
96	Botswana	11 January 1968
97	Burkina Faso	3 June 1968
98	Malta	10 July 1968
99	Central African Republic	18 May 1970
100	Equatorial Guinea	22 July 1970
101	Malaysia	16 September 1971
102	Bangladesh	28 January 1972
103	Gambia	19 February 1972
104	Australia	18 June 1972
105	Liberia	29 November 1972
106	Philippines	5 October 1973
107	Guinea-Bissau	19 October 1973
108	Singapore	23 November 1973
109	Germany	11 December 1973
110	Thailand	15 March 1974
111	Jamaica	3 June 1975
112	Mozambique	10 October 1975
113	Maldives	18 October 1975
114	São Tomé and Príncipe	22 October 1975
115	Cape Verde	28 October 1975
116	Angola	11 November 1975
117	Niger	22 December 1975
118	Madagascar	5 May 1976
119	Guyana	17 May 1976
120	Comoros	7 June 1976
121	Mauritius	10 June 1976
122	Suriname	30 June 1976
123	New Zealand	11 August 1976
124	Gabon	4 October 1976
125	Seychelles	15 December 1976
126	Barbados	29 September 1977
127	Djibouti	8 December 1977
128	Cambodia	10 January 1979
129	Trinidad and Tobago	16 November 1979
130	Grenada	28 November 1979
131	Zimbabwe	25 March 1981
132	Lesotho	7 November 1982
133	Ivory Coast	1 September 1984
134	United Arab Emirates	7 June 1988
135	Papua New Guinea	20 October 1988
—	State of Palestine	9 November 1988
136	South Korea	22 March 1990
—	Sovereign Military Order of Malta	8 June 1990
137	Namibia	11 June 1990
138	Cameroon	27 September 1990
139	Bahrain	12 October 1990
140	Qatar	14 October 1990
141	Oman	15 October 1990
142	Eswatini	4 January 1991
143	Malawi	20 March 1991
144	San Marino	29 April 1991
145	Estonia	6 October 1991
146	Latvia	6 October 1991
147	Lithuania	6 October 1991
148	South Africa	29 October 1991
149	Belarus	31 January 1992
150	Ukraine	31 January 1992
151	Slovenia	5 February 1992
152	Brunei	2 March 1992
153	Armenia	30 March 1992
154	Croatia	11 May 1992
155	Moldova	1 June 1992
156	Tajikistan	5 June 1992
157	Georgia	1 January 1993
158	Kazakhstan	1 January 1993
159	Kyrgyzstan	1 January 1993
160	Slovakia	1 January 1993
161	Uzbekistan	1 January 1993
162	Azerbaijan	29 January 1993
163	Turkmenistan	31 January 1993
164	Bosnia and Herzegovina	8 April 1993
165	Eritrea	6 January 1994
166	North Macedonia	2 March 1994
167	Samoa	12 December 1995
168	Saint Vincent and the Grenadines	1995
169	Saudi Arabia	1995
170	Belize	18 January 1996
171	Dominica	13 March 1996
172	Andorra	3 July 1996
173	Fiji	17 July 1996
174	Saint Lucia	6 August 1996
175	Solomon Islands	30 October 1996
176	Antigua and Barbuda	31 January 1997
177	Timor-Leste	20 May 2002
178	Vanuatu	12 December 2002
179	Palau	17 September 2003
180	Federated States of Micronesia	6 October 2004
181	Bahamas	6 June 2005
182	Tuvalu	28 July 2005
183	Montenegro	15 June 2006
184	Nauru	19 February 2007
185	Kiribati	27 June 2007
186	Tonga	19 September 2007
—	Cook Islands	12 May 2008
—	Kosovo	16 June 2008
187	Monaco	4 July 2008
188	Marshall Islands	30 April 2009
189	Liechtenstein	8 September 2009
190	Saint Kitts and Nevis	18 February 2010
191	Bhutan	2 December 2011
192	South Sudan	December 2012

== Bilateral relations ==
=== Multilateral ===
Organization	Formal Relations Began	Notes
European Union		See Czech Republic in the European Union Czech Republic joined the European Union as a full member on 1 May 2004.
NATO		Czech Republic joined NATO as a full member on 12 March 1999.

=== Africa ===
Country	Formal relations began	Notes
Cape Verde		Czech Republic is represented in Cape-Verde by its embassy in Lisbon, Portugal and an honorary consulate in Praia.
Ethiopia		Ethiopia is accredited to the Czech Republic from its embassy in Berlin, Germany.; Czech Republic has an embassy in Addis Ababa.
Egypt		Czech Republic has an embassy in Cairo.; Egypt has an embassy in Prague.
Guinea-Bissau	1973	Both countries established diplomatic relations in 1973 (with Czechoslovakia) and in 1993.; Czech Republic is represented in Guinea-Bissau by its embassy in Accra, Ghana.
Kenya		See Czech Republic–Kenya relations: Czech Republic has an embassy in Nairobi.; Kenya is accredited to the Czech Republic from its embassy in The Hague, Netherlands.
Libya	1993	See Czech Republic–Libya relations: Both countries established diplomatic relations in 1993.; Czech Republic has an embassy in Tripoli.; Libya has a consulate in Prague.

=== Americas ===
Country	Formal relations began	Notes
Belize		The Czech Republic is represented in Belize through its embassy in Mexico City and has an honorary consulate.; Belize has an honorary consulate in Prague.
Brazil	1918	See Brazil–Czech Republic relations: Brazil has an embassy in Prague.; Czech Republic has an embassy in Brasília and a consulate-general in São Paulo.
Canada		See Canada–Czech Republic relations: Canada has an embassy in Prague; The Czech Republic has an embassy in Ottawa and a consulate-general in Toronto and an honorary consulate in Calgary.
Colombia		See Colombia–Czech Republic relations: Colombia is accredited to the Czech Republic from its embassy in Vienna, Austria.; Czech Republic has an embassy in Bogotá and 3 consulates (in Barranquilla, Cartagena and Medellín).
Mexico	1922	See Czech Republic–Mexico relations Diplomatic relations between Czechoslovakia and Mexico were established in 1922. Mexico re-recognized Czech independence in 1993 after its separation with Slovakia.: Czech Republic has an embassy in Mexico City and honorary consulates in Monterrey, Guadalajara and Tijuana.; Mexico has an embassy in Prague.
Peru		Main article: Czech Republic–Peru relations: Czech Republic has an embassy in Lima.; Peru has an embassy in Prague. Relations were broken in 1957, but reestablished in 1969.
United States		See Czech Republic–United States relations U.S. President Woodrow Wilson and the United States played a major role in the establishment of Czechoslovakia on 28 October 1918.: The Czech Republic has an embassy in Washington, D.C., and consulates-general in Chicago, Los Angeles and New York.; The United States has an embassy in Prague.
Uruguay		See Czech Republic–Uruguay relations: The Czech Republic is accredited to Uruguay from its embassy in Buenos Aires, Argentina.; Uruguay is accredited to the Czech Republic from its embassy in Vienna, Austria.

=== Asia ===
Country	Formal relations began	Notes
Armenia	30 March 1992	Armenia has an embassy in Prague.; The Czech Republic has an embassy in Yerevan.; The Czech Republic has recognized the Armenian genocide in 2017.; Both countries are full members of the Council of Europe.
Azerbaijan	29 January 1993	The Czech Republic recognized the independence of Azerbaijan on 8 January 1992.; Azerbaijan has an embassy in Prague.; Czech Republic has an embassy in Baku.; Both countries are full members of the Council of Europe and the Organization for Security and Co-operation in Europe (OSCE).
China	6 October 1949	See China–Czech Republic relations: Czech Republic has an embassy in Beijing and consulates-general in Chengdu, Hong Kong and Shanghai.; China has an embassy in Prague.
Georgia	1 January 1993	The Czech Republic has an embassy in Tbilisi.; Georgia has an embassy in Prague since 2006.; The Czech Republic is an EU member and Georgia is an EU candidate.; Georgian Ministry of Foreign relations about the relation with the Czech Republic
India		See Czech Republic–India relations: The Czech Republic has an embassy in New Delhi.; Consulate of Czech Republic in India at Chennai, Mumbai and Kolkata.; India has an embassy in Prague.
Indonesia		See Czech Republic–Indonesia relations
Iran	30 April 1929	See Czech Republic–Iran relations: The Czech Republic has an embassy in Tehran.; Iran has an embassy in Prague.
Iraq	1993	See Czech Republic–Iraq relations: The Czech Republic has an embassy in Baghdad.; Iraq has an embassy in Prague.; The Czech Republic was part of the Multinational force in Iraq between 2003 and 4 December 2008.
Israel	3 July 1948	See Czech Republic–Israel relations The government of Czechoslovakia recognised independence of Israel five days after its declaration on 19 May 1948. Diplomatic relations between both countries were established on 3 July 1948. Czechoslovakia supported with military aircraft and weapons newly created Israeli state for several months, however then-new communist government ceased this support and in few years even the diplomatic relations were broken. Communist regime did spread anti-Israeli propaganda, like all then socialist countries. After the Velvet revolution, the relations were renewed. The Czech Republic has an embassy in Tel Aviv and 4 honorary consulates (in Eilat, Haifa, Jerusalem and Ramat Gan). Israel has an embassy in Prague. In December 2008 the Czech Air Force wanted to train in desert conditions for the upcoming mission in Afghanistan. No country agreed to help, except Israel. Israel saw it as an opportunity to thank the Czechs for training Israeli pilots when the country was first established. There are 3,000 Jews living in the Czech Republic (see also History of the Jews in the Czech Republic).
Japan	1919	See Czech Republic–Japan relations: Japan's first Minister Plenipotentiary to Czechoslovakia was Harukazu Nagaoka; Relations between Czechoslovakia and Japan were broken off in 1939, and not re-established until 1957; The Czech Republic has an embassy in Tokyo and an honorary consulate in Kobe.; Japan has an embassy in Prague.
Kazakhstan		See Czech Republic–Kazakhstan relations: The Czech Republic has an embassy in Astana and a branch office of the embassy in Almaty.; Kazakhstan has an embassy in Prague and an honorary consulate in Jaroměř.
Malaysia		See Czech Republic–Malaysia relations: Czech Republic has an embassy in Kuala Lumpur.; Malaysia has an embassy in Prague.; Following the establishment of relations with the Soviet Union in 1968, Malaysia also expanded its relations with Czech Republic and other Eastern European countries.
Mongolia	1992	See Czech Republic–Mongolia relations: After the 1992 dissolution of Czechoslovakia, Mongolia reaffirmed its relations with the newly formed Czech Republic in 1993.; The Embassy of the Czech Republic in Ulaanbaatar was formally reopened in 1999.
North Korea		According to reporting in Deník N, the Security Information Service expelled a North Korean diplomat who was attempting to circumvent the sanctions against North Korea.; North Korea has an embassy in Prague.; Czech Republic has an embassy in Pyongyang.
Pakistan	27 September 1950	See Pakistan-Czech Republic relations: The Czech Republic has an embassy in Islamabad and two honorary consulates in Lahore and Karachi.; Pakistan has an embassy in Prague.; On 20 September 2008 the Czech Republic's ambassador to Pakistan, Ivo Žďárek, was killed in a blast at the Marriott Hotel in Islamabad.
Philippines		See Czech Republic–Philippines relations: The current diplomatic relationship of the Czech Republic and the Philippines has its roots to the friendship of Filipino national hero José Rizal and Ferdinand Blumentritt even neither countries existed yet back in the 19th century. Rizal visited Blumentritt in the city of Litomerice, Bohemia (present day Czech Republic) in 1887. According to Filipino Foreign secretary Albert del Rosario, the friendship between the two men served as the foundation of the current bilateral ties between the two countries.; Czech Republic has an embassy in Manila.; Philippines has an embassy in Prague.
South Korea	22 March 1990	See Czech Republic–South Korea relations: The establishment of diplomatic relations between the Czech Republic and the Republic of Korea (South Korea) began on 22 March 1990.; South Korea has an embassy in Prague since 1990.; The Czech Republic has an embassy in Seoul since 1991.; There is also the Czech Info Center in Seoul.; The Czech Republic has a Working Holiday Program Agreement with South Korea It was at the first time with a country of the Asia.
Taiwan		See Czech Republic–Taiwan relations: Taipei Economic and Cultural Representative Office in Prague; Czech Economic and Cultural Representative Office in Taipei
Turkey	1924	See Czech Republic–Turkey relations: The Czech Republic has an embassy in Ankara and a consulate-general in Istanbul.; Turkey has en embassy in Prague.; Both are members of NATO; The Czech Republic is an EU member and Turkey is an EU candidate. The Czech Republic supports Turkey's accession negotiations to the EU, although negotiations have now been suspended.
Vietnam	2 February 1950	See Czech Republic–Vietnam relations: The Czech Republic has an embassy in Hanoi.; Vietnam has an embassy in Prague.

=== Europe ===
Country	Formal relations began	Notes
Albania		See Albania–Czech Republic relations The multi-national Communist armed forces' sole joint action was the Warsaw Pact invasion of Czechoslovakia in August 1968. All member countries, with the exception of the People's Republic of Albania and the Socialist Republic of Romania participated in the invasion. Albania formally withdrew from the Warsaw Pact in 1968 over the matter.: Albania has an embassy in Prague.; Czech Republic has an embassy in Tirana.
Austria		See Austria–Czech Republic relations: Austria has an embassy in Prague.; Czech Republic has an embassy in Vienna.; Both countries are full members of the European Union. They share 362 km (225 mi) of common border, which can be crossed anywhere without border control due to the Schengen Agreement.
Belarus		See Belarus–Czech Republic relations: Belarus has an embassy in Prague.; Czech Republic has an embassy in Minsk.
Belgium	21 September 1919	Belgium has an embassy in Prague.; Czech Republic has an embassy in Brussels.; Both countries are full members of the European Union and NATO.
Bulgaria		See Bulgaria–Czech Republic relations Diplomatic relations between Bulgaria and Czechoslovakia were established on 27 September 1920, they were severed on 1 June 1939 and were restored on 10 October 1945. On 23 December 1992 Bulgaria recognised the Czech Republic and established diplomatic relations with it at the level of embassies as of 1 January 1993.: Bulgaria has an embassy in Prague.; Czech Republic has an embassy in Sofia.; Both countries are full members of the European Union and NATO.
Croatia		See Croatia–Czech Republic relations: Croatia has an embassy in Prague.; Czech Republic has an embassy in Zagreb.; Both countries are full members of the European Union and NATO.
Cyprus		See Cyprus–Czech Republic relations: Cyprus has an embassy in Prague.; Czech Republic has an embassy in Nicosia.; Both countries are full members of the European Union.
Denmark		See Czech Republic–Denmark relations: The Czech Republic has an embassy in Copenhagen and an honorary consulate in Højbjerg.; Denmark has an embassy in Prague.; Both countries are full members of NATO and of the European Union.
Estonia	1920s	Both countries restored their diplomatic relation on 9 September 1991. On 1 January 1993 diplomatic relations were automatically transferred to the successor states of Czechoslovakia.; Czech Republic has an embassy in Tallinn.; Estonia has an embassy in Prague.; Both countries are full members of NATO and of the European Union.; Estonia Ministry of Foreign affairs about relations with the Czech Republic
Finland	1 January 1993	Finland recognised the independence of the Czech Republic on 1 January 1993.; The Czech Republic has an embassy in Helsinki. Finland has an embassy in Prague.; Both countries are full members of the European Union and NATO.; Embassy of the Czech Republic in Helsinki; Ministry for Foreign Affairs of Finland about relations with the Czech Republic
France		See Czech Republic–France relations: The first diplomatic contacts date back from the Middle Ages. France has been the first country to recognize Czechoslovakia on 28 October 1918.; The two countries concluded a treaty of Alliance on 25 January 1924.; The Czech Republic has an embassy in Paris and four honorary consulates (in Lille, Lyon, Nancy, and Nantes).; France has an embassy in Prague.; Both countries are full members of NATO and of the European Union. Since 1999, Czech Republic is an observer in the Francophonie.; French Foreign Ministry about relations with the Czech Republic
Germany		See Czech Republic–Germany relations: Both countries share 815 km (506 mi) of common borders.; The Czech Republic has an embassy in Berlin, three general consulates (in Bonn, Dresden and Munich), and 6 honorary consulates (in Dortmund, Frankfurt, Hamburg, Nürnberg, Rostock and Stuttgart).; Germany has an embassy in Prague.
Greece	1 January 1993	See Czech Republic–Greece relations: The Czech Republic has an embassy in Athens.; Greece has an embassy in Prague.; Both countries are full members of NATO and of the European Union.
Hungary	1 January 1993	Before 1918, both countries were part of Austria-Hungary.; The Czech Republic has an embassy in Budapest.; Hungary has an embassy in Prague.; Both countries are full members of NATO and of the European Union.
Iceland	1 January 1993	See Czech Republic–Iceland relations: Neither country has a resident embassy.; The Czech Republic is accredited to Iceland from its embassy in Oslo, Norway and maintains an honorary consulate in Reykjavík.; Iceland is accredited to the Czech Republic through its embassy in Vienna, Austria and maintains an honorary consulate in Prague.; Both countries are full members of NATO, of the Council of Europe and of the Organisation for Economic Co-operation and Development.
Ireland	1929	The Czech Republic has an embassy in Dublin.; Ireland has an embassy in Prague.; Both countries are full members of the European Union and the Council of Europe.; There are approximately 5,300 Czechs living in Ireland.; The Czech Irish Business Association supports Czech / Irish Business ventures
Italy		See Czech Republic–Italy relations: Northern Italy and the Czech Republic were formerly part of the Holy Roman Empire and the Austrian Empire.; The Czech Republic has an embassy in Rome and a consulate-general in Milan, and 5 honorary consulate (in Florence, Naples, Palermo, Udine, and Venice).; Italy has an embassy in Prague.; Both countries are full members of NATO and of the European Union.; See also:Czechs in Italy and Italians in the Czech Republic
Kosovo	2008	See Czech Republic–Kosovo relations: Czech Republic recognized Kosovo on 21 May 2008.; The Czech Republic opened an embassy in Pristina on 16 July 2008.
Latvia	9 September 1991	Czechoslovakia recognised Latvia on 5 January 1922.; The Czech Republic has an embassy in Riga.; Latvia has an embassy in Prague.; Both countries are full members of NATO and of the European Union.; Latvian Ministry of Foreign Affairs about relations with the Czech Republic
Lithuania	5 January 1922	Both countries re-established diplomatic relations on 9 September 1991.; Lithuania recognised the Czech Republic after the split of Czechoslovakia on 5 January 1992 and diplomatic relation were established the following day.; The Czech Republic has an embassy in Vilnius.; Lithuania has an embassy in Prague and an honorary consulate in Brno.; Both countries are full members of NATO and of the European Union.; Lithuanian Ministry of Foreign affairs: list of bilateral treaties with the Czech Republic (in Lithuanian only)
Luxembourg		The Czech Republic has an embassy in Luxembourg City.; Luxembourg has an embassy in Prague.; Both countries are full members of the Organisation for Economic Co-operation and Development, of the European Union and of NATO.; See also:Czechs in Luxembourg and Luxembourgians in the Czech Republic
Malta		The Czech Republic is accredited to Malta from its embassy in Rome, Italy and maintains an honorary consulate in Valletta.; Malta is accredited to the Czech Republic from a non-resident ambassador based at the Foreign Ministry at Valletta.; Both countries are full members of the European Union.
Moldova		See Czech Republic–Moldova relations: The Czech Republic has an embassy in Chișinău.; Moldova has an embassy in Prague.; The Czech Republic is an EU member and Moldova is an EU candidate.
Netherlands	13 November 1919	See Czech Republic–Netherlands relations: The Czech Republic has an embassy in The Hague and an honorary consulate in Amsterdam.; The Netherlands has an embassy in Prague.; Both countries are full members of the European Union and NATO.; Dutch Ministry of Foreign Affairs about the relation with the Czech Republic (in Dutch only); See also:Czechs in the Netherlands and Dutchs in the Czech Republic, Czech Republic-Netherlands relations
North Macedonia		See Czech Republic–North Macedonia relations: Czech Republic has an embassy in Skopje.; North Macedonia has an embassy in Prague.; Both countries are full members of NATO.
Poland		See Czech Republic–Poland relations Both countries are full members of the European Union and NATO. They share 796 km (495 mi) of common border, which can be crossed anywhere without border control due to the Schengen Agreement.: Czech Republic has an embassy in Warsaw and a consulate-general in Katowice.; Poland has an embassy in Prague and a consulate-general in Ostrava.
Portugal		Czech Republic has an embassy in Lisbon.; Portugal has an embassy in Prague.; Both countries are full members of the European Union and NATO.; See also:Czechs in Portugal and Portuguese in the Czech Republic
Romania	6 April 1919	After the splitting of Czechoslovakia, the Czech Republic and Romania established diplomatic relation on 18 December 1992.; The Czech Republic has an embassy in Bucharest.; Romania has an embassy in Prague.; Both countries are full members of NATO and of the European Union.
Russia		See Czech Republic–Russia relations The present day relations between the two countries have deteriorated in the wake of events such as the Russian annexation of Crimea, the 2014 Vrbětice ammunition warehouses explosions, and the 2022 Russian invasion of Ukraine. Russia also has further reduced its oil deliveries to the Czech Republic.: The Czech Republic has an embassy in Moscow. On 24 February 2022 the Czech Republic decided to close its both consulates-general in Saint Petersburg and Yekaterinburg following the Russian invasion of Ukraine.; Russia has an embassy in Prague. On 24 February 2022 the Czech Republic decided to close both of Russia's consulates-general in Brno and Karlovy Vary following the Russian invasion of Ukraine.
Serbia	1918	See Czech Republic–Serbia relations: The Czech Republic has an embassy in Belgrade.; Serbia has an embassy in Prague.; Czech Republic is an EU member and Serbia is an candidate.; Czech relations with Serbia were usually positive, just like relations between Czechoslovakia and Yugoslavia (prewar). However, Czech government under administration of Mirek Topolánek decided to recognize Kosovo – the very important issue in Serbian politics.
Slovakia	1 January 1993	See Czech Republic–Slovakia relations Before 1918, both countries were part of Austria-Hungary, and between 1918 and 1 January 1993, both countries were part of Czechoslovakia.: Czech Republic has an embassy in Bratislava.; Slovakia has an embassy in Prague.; Both countries are full members of the European Union and NATO.
Slovenia		Czech Republic has an embassy in Ljubljana.; Slovenia has an embassy in Prague.; Both countries are full members of the European Union and NATO.
Spain		See Czech Republic–Spain relations: Czech Republic has an embassy in Madrid.; Spain has an embassy in Prague.; Both countries are full members of the European Union and NATO.
Sweden		See Czech Republic–Sweden relations: Czech Republic has an embassy in Stockholm.; Sweden has an embassy in Prague.; Both countries are full members of the European Union and NATO.
Switzerland		Czech Republic has an embassy in Bern.; Switzerland has an embassy in Prague.; Both countries are full members of the Council of Europe.
Ukraine		See Czech Republic–Ukraine relations: The Czech Republic has an embassy in Kyiv and 2 general consulates in Donetsk and Lviv.; Ukraine has an embassy in Prague, a consulate and an honorary consulate in Brno.; The Czech Republic is an EU member and Ukraine is an EU candidate.; During the Interwar era the Ukrainian province Zakarpattia Oblast was part of Czechoslovakia.
United Kingdom	26 October 1918	See Czech Republic–United Kingdom relations British Prime Minister Keir Starmer with Czech Prime Minister Petr Fiala at a European Political Community summit in Budapest, November 2024. Czechia established diplomatic relations with the United Kingdom on 26 October 1918.: Czechia maintains an embassy in London.; The United Kingdom is accredited to Czechia through its embassy in Prague.; Both countries share common membership of the Council of Europe, the European Court of Human Rights, the International Criminal Court, NATO, the OSCE, the United Nations, and the World Trade Organization. Bilaterally the two countries have a Double Taxation Convention.

=== Oceania ===
Country	Formal relations began	Notes
Nauru	2007	The Czech Republic has an embassy in Manila, Philippines, with concurrent accreditation to Nauru (and Federated States of Micronesia, Marshall Islands and Palau). As of October 2023, the Ambassador of the Czech Republic to Nauru is Karel Hejč.; Nauru currently (as of October 2023) does not have any diplomatic mission accredited for the Czech Republic. In 2018, the Czech Republic was the third most important export partner. 15.5% of Nauru's exports, amounting to 2.4 million USD, went to the Czech Republic (mainly dairy products, metal parts and air conditioning). The percentage of exports has been steadily increasing since 2014. In 2007, the first development project of the Czech Republic took place on Nauru called "Water for Nauru" worth 500,000 CZK.

== Multilateral relations ==
- Foreign relations of the European Union
- Foreign relations of NATO

== See also ==
- List of diplomatic missions in the Czech Republic
- Visa policy of the Schengen Area
- Visa requirements for Czech citizens
- Visa (document)#Visa restrictions
