= Czech Republic–Kenya relations =

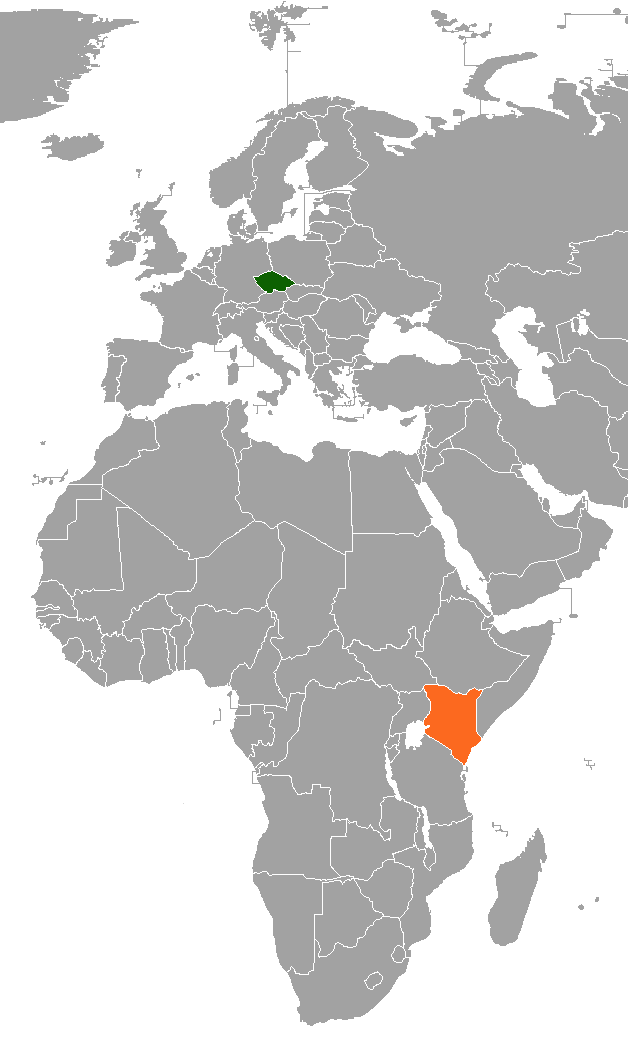
- Czech Republic: Kenya

Czech Republic–Kenya relations are the bilateral relations between Czech Republic and Kenya.

== History ==
Kenya and the Czech Republic maintain cordial relations.

The First Deputy Prime Minister and Foreign Minister of the Czech Republic visited Kenya in 2011. In 2006, the Czech Deputy Minister of Industry and Trade visited Kenya. A 14-member parliamentary team visited and attended an inter-parliamentary meeting in Nairobi. The Kenyan tourism minister visited the Czech Republic in 2006.

== Development cooperation ==
Kenya and the Czech Republic have signed agreements in:

- Scientific and Technical Cooperation between the governments of the Czechoslovak Socialist Republic and Kenya in 1964
- Cultural Cooperation signed between the governments of the Czechoslovak Socialist Republic and Kenya in 1986
- Air Services Agreement signed between the governments of the Czechoslovak Socialist Republic and Kenya in 1989

Both countries have identified key areas in development such as commerce, trade, tourism, education and culture.

The Government of the Czech Republic offers two scholarships to Kenyans annually, about 30 Kenyans study in the Czech Republic. Approximately 50 Kenyans live in the Czech Republic. The Czech Republic has also in the past offered assistance in environmental protection and drought mitigation.

== Tourism ==
Approximately, 10,000 Czech tourists visit Kenya annually. The first ever chartered flight from Prague to Kenya was inaugurated in 2006.

== Trade ==
Kenya is one of the most important trade partners for the Czech Republic in Sub-Saharan Africa.

In 2006, bilateral trade was worth KES. 638.2 million (EUR. 6.2 million). The Czech Republic exported goods worth KES. 446.1 million (EUR. 4.35 million) to Kenya.

The balance of trade is still heavily in favour of the Czech Republic as Kenya's exports largely consist of agricultural produce.

Kenya's main exports to the Czech Republic include: coffee, cut flowers, fruit and vegetables.

The Czech Republic's main exports to Kenya include: steel rods, glass beads, aircraft and their spare parts, instruments and carpets, forklifts, pharmaceutical products, surgical equipments, lathes and agricultural inputs and vehicles.

== Diplomatic missions ==
The Kenyan embassy in Berlin is accredited to the Czech Republic. The Czech Republic opened its embassy in Nairobi in November 2014.

== Resident diplomatic missions ==
- the Czech Republic has an embassy in Nairobi.
- Kenya is accredited to the Czech Republic from its embassy in Berlin, Germany.

== See also ==
- Foreign relations of the Czech Republic
- Foreign relations of Kenya
