= Czech Republic–India relations =

- Czech Republic: India

Diplomatic mission
- Embassy of the Czech Republic, New Delhi: Embassy of India, Prague

Envoy
- Ambassador: Ambassador

Economic relations between India and Czech Republic date back to the Middle Ages. People in both countries have always been interested in learning more about the history, language and culture of the other country. During the years after India's independence, Czechoslovakia also played a role as a vital economic partner.

== History ==
Bohemia (now a land that is part of the Czech Republic) traded extensively with India for unique and valuable goods such as spices. These Indian spices were transported into the then Czechoslovakia through both land and sea routes. It is also interesting to note that Charles University, the oldest and the largest university in the Czech Republic, was home to a great number of Sanskrit scholars. During the next few centuries, India-Czech Republic relations strengthened further as many artists, businessmen, scholars and political leaders travelled between the two countries. After returning from their visit to India, many Czech scholars would spread knowledge about Indian culture and heritage to the Czech people. Additionally, many notable Indian scholars and writers visited Prague as well as other cities in Czechoslovakia. These visits increased Czech people's knowledge of India and facilitated in forming connections between the two countries. The increase in the amount of bilateral trade led to the establishment of even more personal connections. For example, in 1920, a Czechoslovak Consulate was set up in Bombay, India and a few more years later a Czechoslovak Consulate was set up in Calcutta as well. These consulates paved a way for people with similar professional and personal interests from both countries to come together and interact.

India has possessed trade relations with Czechoslovakia since before India's independence. Even in the 1930s, Bata had more than a 100 Czechoslovak employees in Calcutta, India. During the years after India's independence, Czechoslovakia set up a great number of major projects in India in fields such as energy, defence and metallurgy. However, after the creation of the Czech Republic on 1 January 1993, trade declined due to the liquidation of some major state-owned corporations in the Czech Republic and the switch to payments being made in freely convertible currencies.

Diplomatic relations between the two countries were first formally established on 18 November 1947, after which many former Indian presidents and prime ministers paid frequent visits to Czechoslovakia. Many high-profile visits have taken place after the Velvet Revolution and the establishment of Czech Republic and Slovakia. In February 1994, former Czech President Václav Havel visited India, where he received two prestigious awards: the Indira Gandhi Peace Prize and the Mahatma Gandhi Peace Prize. In October 1998, the two countries signed a Double Taxation Avoidance Agreement. In June 2010, the Vice President of India, Mohammad Hamid Ansari, visited the Czech Republic and a Social Security Agreement as well as an Agreement on Economic Cooperation between the two countries were signed.

== Cultural relations ==
Czech people are passionate about yoga, Ayurveda and Indian religious texts. Many universities in the Czech Republic have a long history of offering education about Indian culture, languages, literature and history. Similarly, in the Delhi University in India, students can learn Czech language and history, and are increasingly eager to visit Czech Republic to explore the architecture, history and beauty.

== Agreements ==
The following is a list of some of the important agreements signed between India and Czech Republic:

- 1966: Agreement on the use of nuclear energy for peaceful purposes
- 1973: Agreement on scientific, technical and industrial cooperation
- 1978: Agreement on cooperation in sea transportation
- 1993: Trade Agreement between the Government of the Czech Republic and the Government of the Republic of India
- 1998: Bilateral Investment Promotion and Protection Agreement (BIPPA)
- 1999: Double Taxation Avoidance Agreement (DTAA)
- 2003: Agreement on Defence Cooperation between the Government of the Czech Republic and the Government of the Republic of India
- 2010: Agreement on Economic Cooperation between the Government of the Czech Republic and the Government of the Republic of India

== Economic relations ==
For many decades, Czechoslovakia was one of India's main trading partners among other the East-European countries. Many Czech companies have contributed in developing India's industrial future by delivering the necessary equipment required for the power and engineering industries and sectors. Even in today's world, the Czech Republic is very often associated in India with famous Czech companies like Skoda, Tatra, Bata and Zetor. The science and technology sectors are some of the most favourable areas of future cooperation between India and Czech Republic. Sectors such as petrochemicals, food processing and civil aviation are also reported to be areas where both countries can benefit from each other.

From 2012 onwards, bilateral trade between India and Czech Republic has amounted to about more than a billion U.S. dollars. In 2017, the bilateral trade turnover was 1466 million U.S. dollars. Czech companies mainly export cars, machinery energy facilities and turbines to India, while Indian companies mainly export electrical machinery, iron and steel, cotton and organic chemicals to Czech Republic. Furthermore, Indian companies like Infosys, Ashok Leyland and Tata Tea have also invested in sectors of the Czech Republic such as IT, vehicles, textile, and tea. Inspired by the investment activities of companies such as Škoda Auto and Tatra in India, a number of other prospective Czech companies are considering investment projects in India in sectors like transportation, power, defence and machinery.

An important sector of bilateral trade cooperation between the two countries is the automotive industry. Skoda Auto is flourishing in India with its widespread productions of Skoda cars as well as a collection of 106 outlets, 69 dealerships and 67 service centres across the country. In 2017, Škoda Auto sold 17,438 units in India. In July 2018, Czech vehicle manufacturer Tatra was reported to be stepping into a partnership along with Reliance Defence in order to build military trucks for India. The company's engagement in building goods for the Indian defence industry is another activity that highlights the strengthening of economic relations between India and Czech Republic. By far, one of the biggest successes of a Czech company in India is that of Bata as it possesses an extensive sales network across the entire country. It was reported that the company expects India to serve as its most important market by the end of 2018. At the end of December 2017, Bata India reported a 6.2 per cent rise in its net sales.

=== Czech Investment in India ===
The Indian market has established itself as a key destination for many Czech brands and companies. Czech companies work to establish themselves in the Indian market by offering high-quality products to local consumers. Czech companies are mainly emerging as investors in the fields of energy, finance, engineering and infrastructure.

The following is a list of some important Czech companies that have invested in India:

- Skoda Auto: A premium automobile manufacturer in India.
- Skoda Power: The company supplies a large number of power blocks to India.
- Bata Limited: Leading footwear manufacturer
- Vítkovice Machinery Group: A leading industrial group
- ZKL Bearings CZ: Produces railway bearings
- Bonatrans: Production of railway and metro wheels
- Linet: Production of hospital beds and mattresses.
- FANS: Production of cooling towers
- Tatra: Manufactures trucks for defence purposes.

=== Indian Investment in Czech Republic ===
Many Indian companies, too, have established themselves in the Czech Republic due to the skilled Czech labour and comparatively low wages.

The following is a list of some important Indian companies that have invested in Czech Republic:

- Infosys: Established an IT facility in Brno
- ArcelorMittal: Investment in steel plants in Czech Republic
- Ashok Leyland (Hinduja Group): Production of trucks
- Alok Industries: Manufactures textile material.
- Motherson Sumi Systems Limited: Leading automative manufacturer
- Fedders Electric and Engineering: Produces industrial heat exchangers and industrial coils.

== Tourism ==
Tourism between India and Czech Republic has also been considerably increasing in the past few years. Over the last decade, many of Prague's historical sites have served as shooting locations for a number of big-budget Bollywood films. This has played a role in generating a great amount of interest in the Czech Republic among the people in India and, thus, led to an increase in the number of Indian tourists choosing to travel to Prague. Over the three years to 2018, the number of tourists in the Czech Republic from India has increased to 150 per cent. In 2017, the Czech Republic received 85,680 Indian tourists and it is expecting to receive more than 100,000 tourists from India by the year 2020.

== Future Relations ==
On 22 October 2018, and 23 October 2018, the eleventh session of India – Czech Republic Joint Commission on Economic Cooperation (JCEC) took place. During this, the two countries agreed to work to improve bilateral economic relations. It was agreed that a strong partnership could be formed between India's growth and Czech technological and manufacturing expertise and skill. This relationship had the potential to be mutually beneficial to both countries. Other important issues were also discussed in detail at the JCEC, such as the issuance of long-term student visas and the strengthening of the trade and investment relationship between the two countries. At the same time in Prague, a technical meeting of the eleventh session of the India-Czech Republic JEC was also held. During this, the Czech government shared that it considers India among the top twelve priority countries when it comes to the improvement of mutual economic, business and investment relationships. Furthermore, it was stated that many Czech companies would be interested in cooperating with companies in India.

== Resident diplomatic missions ==
- Czech Republic has an embassy in New Delhi.
- India has an embassy in Prague.
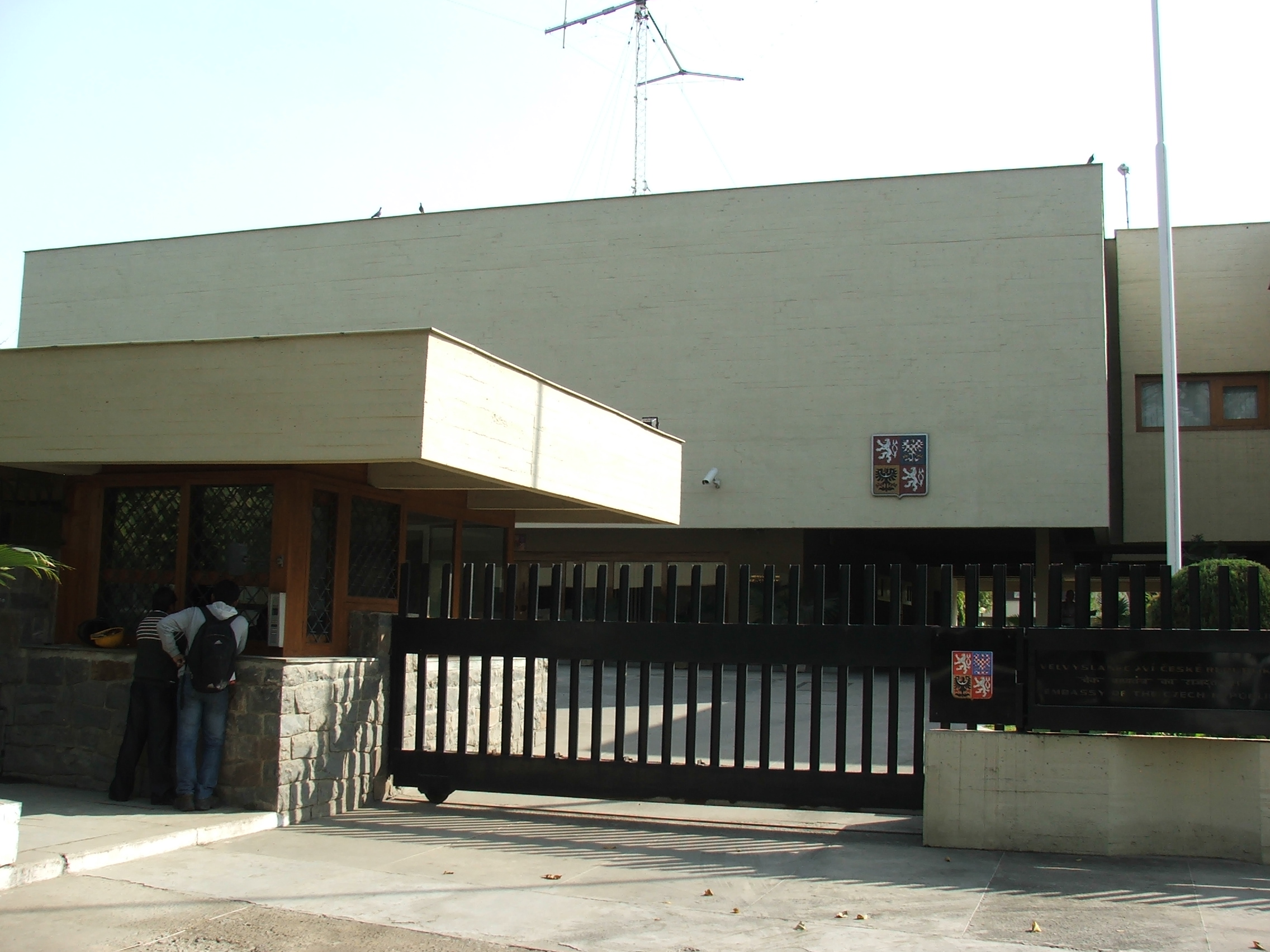
Embassy of the Czech Republic in New Delhi

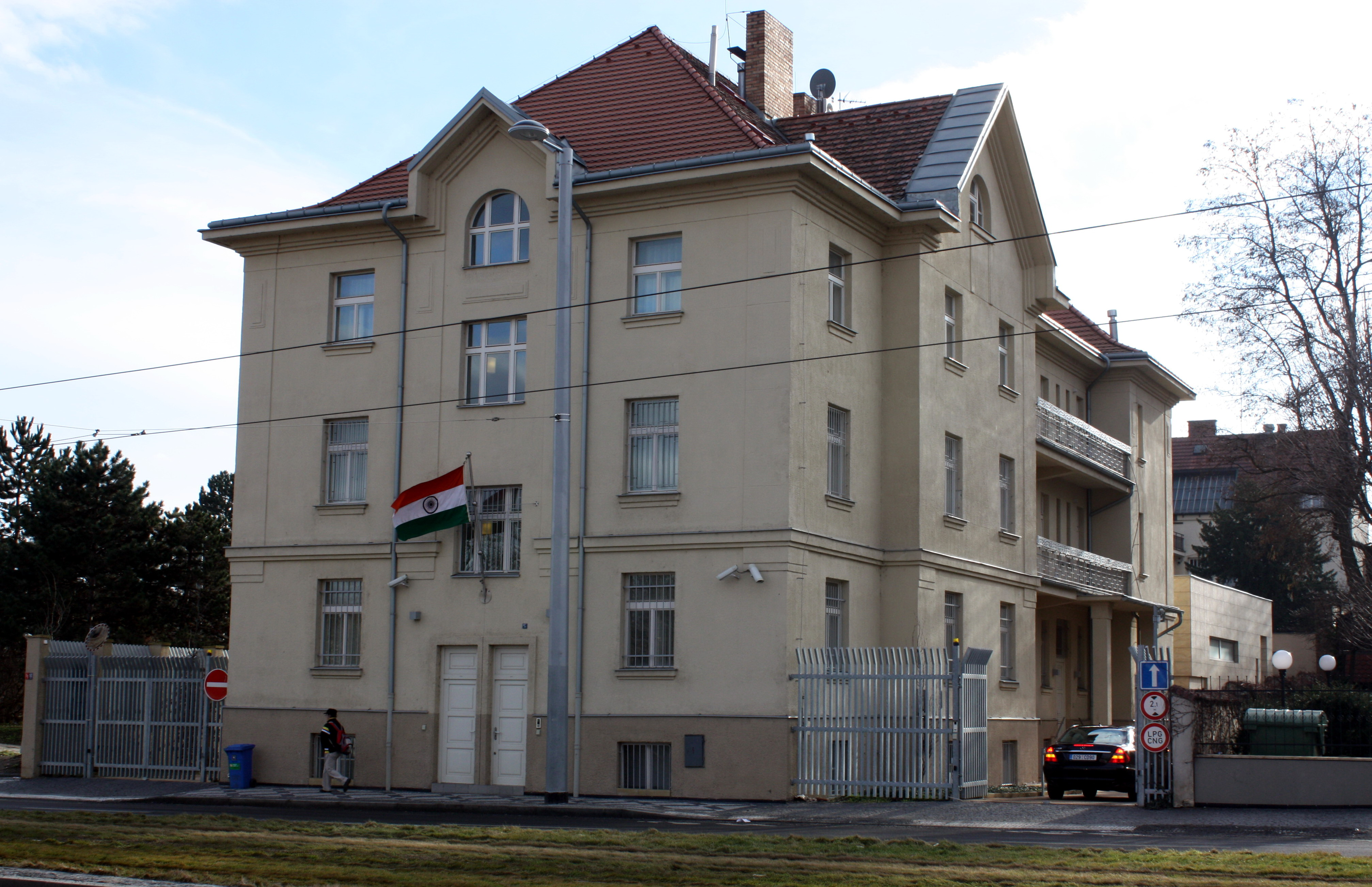
Embassy of India in Prague

== See also ==
- Foreign relations of the Czech Republic
- Foreign relations of India
