= Czech Republic–Uruguay relations =

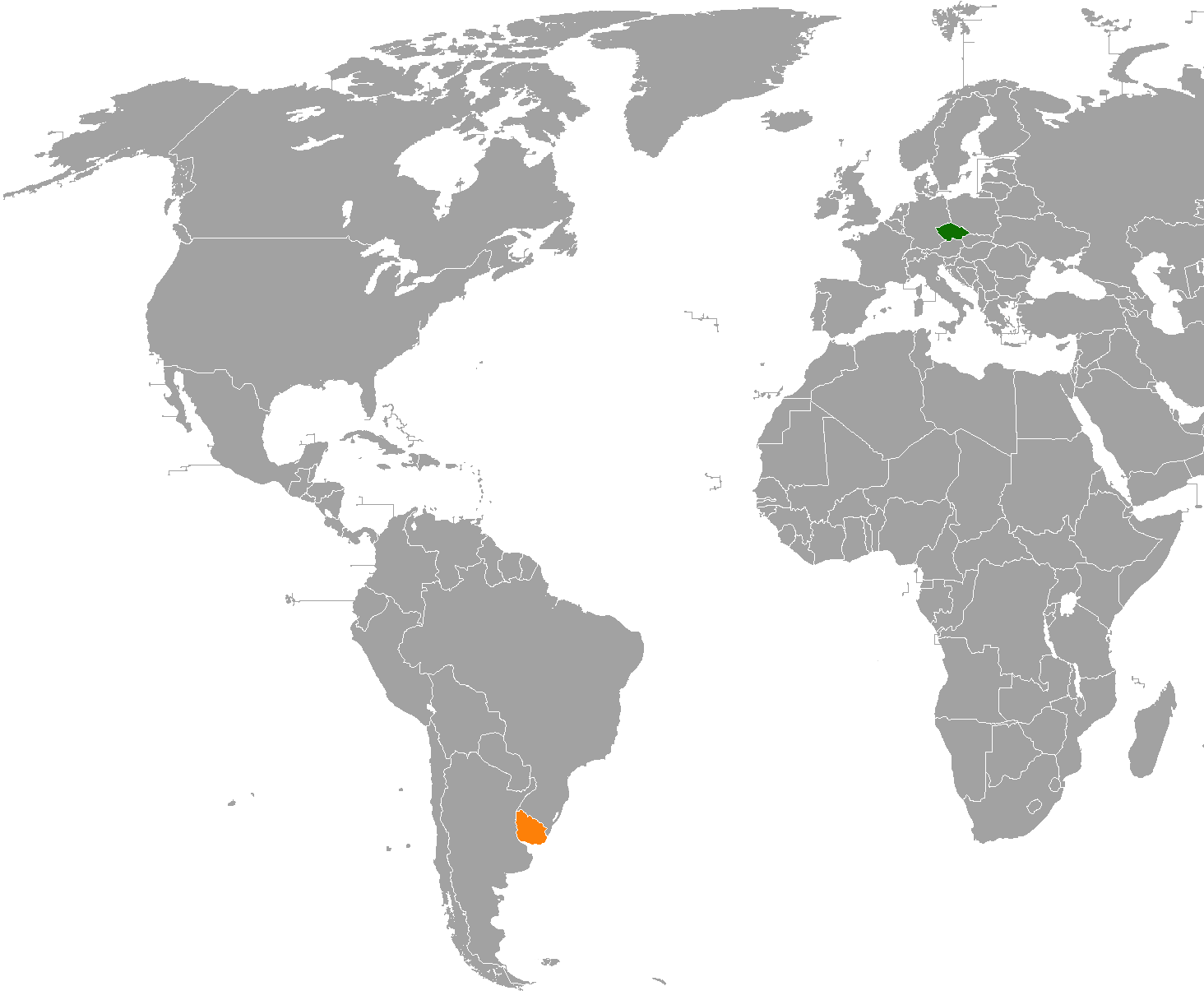
- Czech Republic: Uruguay

Diplomatic relations between the Czech Republic and Uruguay were established in times of the Czechoslovakia. There are also some Czech immigrants in Uruguay.

The Czech Republic is accredited to Uruguay from its embassy in Buenos Aires, Argentina. Uruguay is accredited to the Czech Republic from its embassy in Vienna, Austria.

== Agreements ==
There are a number of agreements between both countries:

- Investment promotion and protection agreement (1996)
- Trade agreement (1996)

== Resident diplomatic missions ==
- the Czech Republic is accredited to Uruguay from its embassy in Buenos Aires, Argentina.
- Uruguay is accredited to the Czech Republic from its embassy in Vienna, Austria.

== See also ==
- Foreign relations of the Czech Republic
- Foreign relations of Uruguay
- Uruguay–EU relations
