= Colombia–Czech Republic relations =

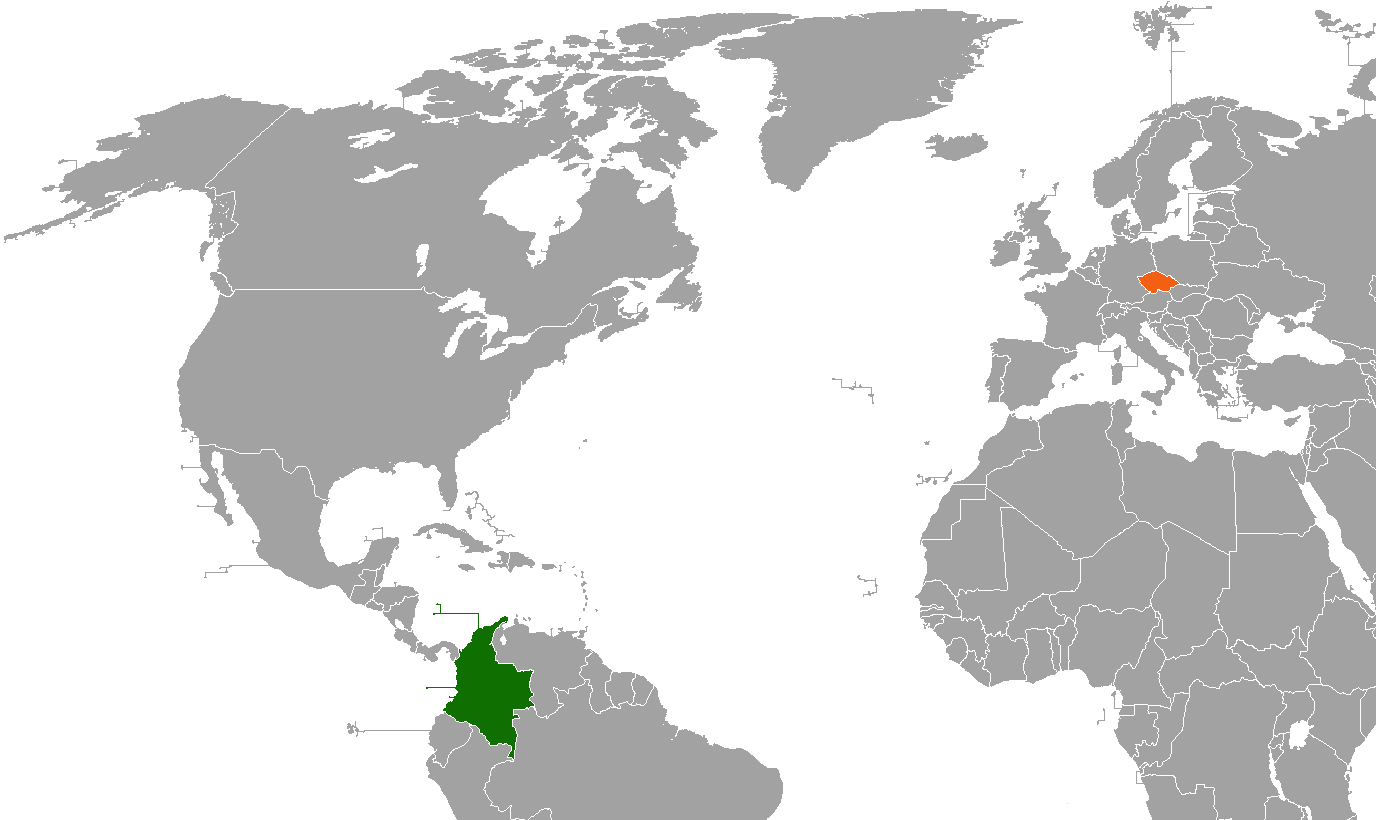
- Colombia: Czech Republic

Colombia–Czech Republic relations are foreign relations between Colombia and the Czech Republic. Colombia is represented in the Czech Republic through its embassy in Vienna (Austria). The Czech Republic has an embassy in Bogotá and 3 honorary consulates (in Barranquilla, Cartagena and Medellín).

== History ==
The first connections between Czech lands and the area of current Colombia occurred in the times of colonial era, during missionary activities of Jesuits in that area. In 1860/1870s the Czech botanist Benedikt Roezl discovered the cycad plant Zamia roezlii on the Pacific coast in Colombia. The plant is named after him. In 1922 began the consulary activities between Czechoslovakia and Colombia. Since 1926 the Colombian consul has had his seat in Prague. In 1935 both countries agreed to exchange ambassadors.

In 2008, during his visit in Colombia, the Czech Prime Minister Mirek Topolánek negotiated a potential sale of the combat aircraft Aero L-159 ALCA with Colombian President Álvaro Uribe.

== See also ==
- Foreign relations of Colombia
- Foreign relations of the Czech Republic
