= Czech Republic–Malaysia relations =

- Czech Republic: Malaysia

Czech Republic–Malaysia relations are foreign relations between the Czech Republic and Malaysia. The Czech Republic has an embassy in Kuala Lumpur, and Malaysia has an embassy in Prague.

== History ==
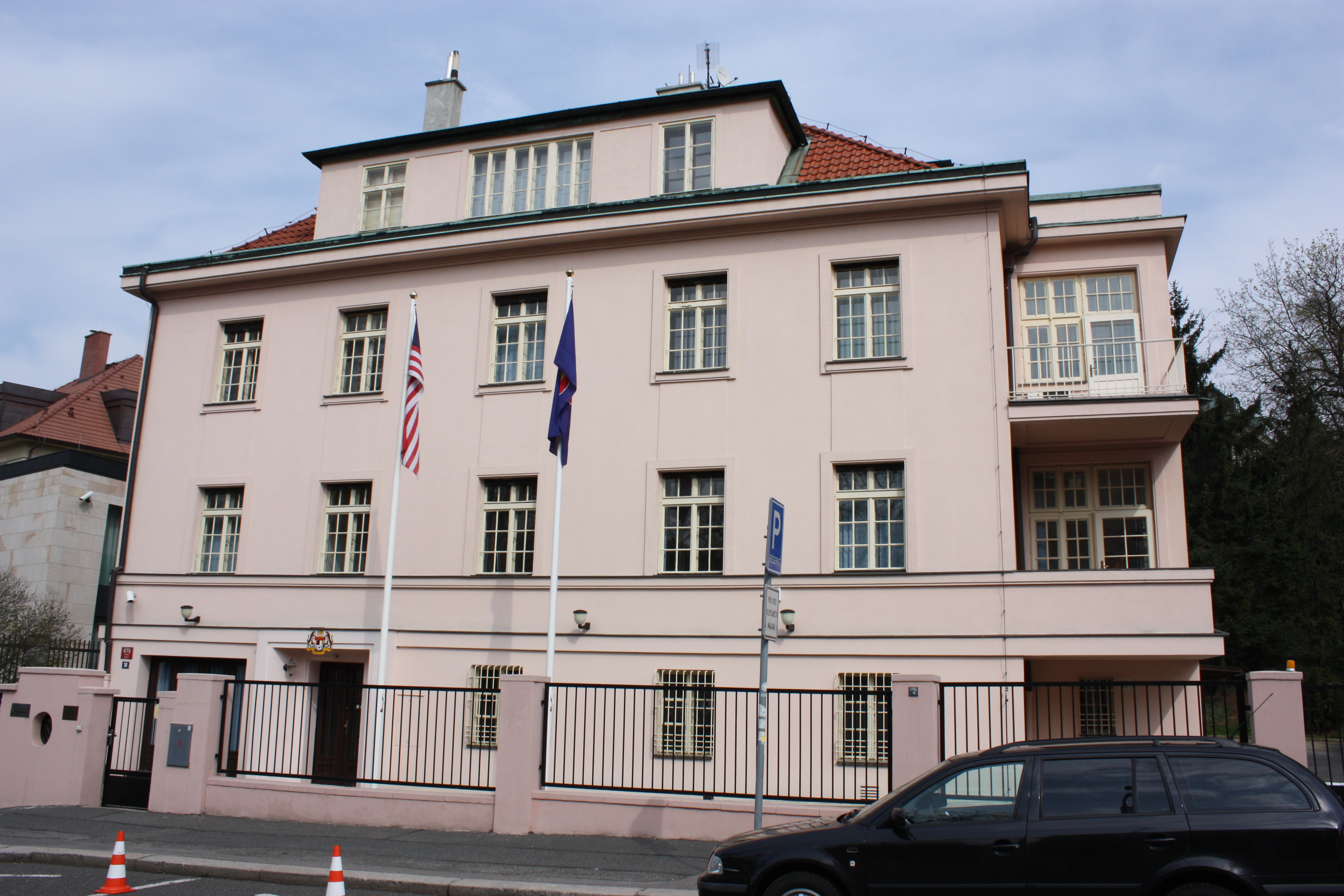
Malaysian embassy in Prague

Following the establishment of relations with the Soviet Union in 1968, Malaysia also expanded its relations with former Czechoslovakia and other Central European countries. In 2000, the Czech Deputy Prime Minister made a visit to Malaysia. While in 2006, Czech Deputy Minister of Foreign Affairs and Czech President of the Senate of Parliament both made an working and official visit to Malaysia. While in the Malaysian side, the chief of armed forces staff made a working visit to the Czech Republic on the same year. In 2012, the Czech President Václav Klaus made a state visit to Malaysia.

The Czech Republic wants to help Malaysia improve its technology for handling dangerous chemicals, biological threats, radiation, and nuclear materials (CBRNe). They also want to work together on getting ready for natural disasters like floods and fires. The Czech Republic thinks they can share their advanced technology and knowledge to help Malaysia stay safe from these threats.

== Economic relations ==
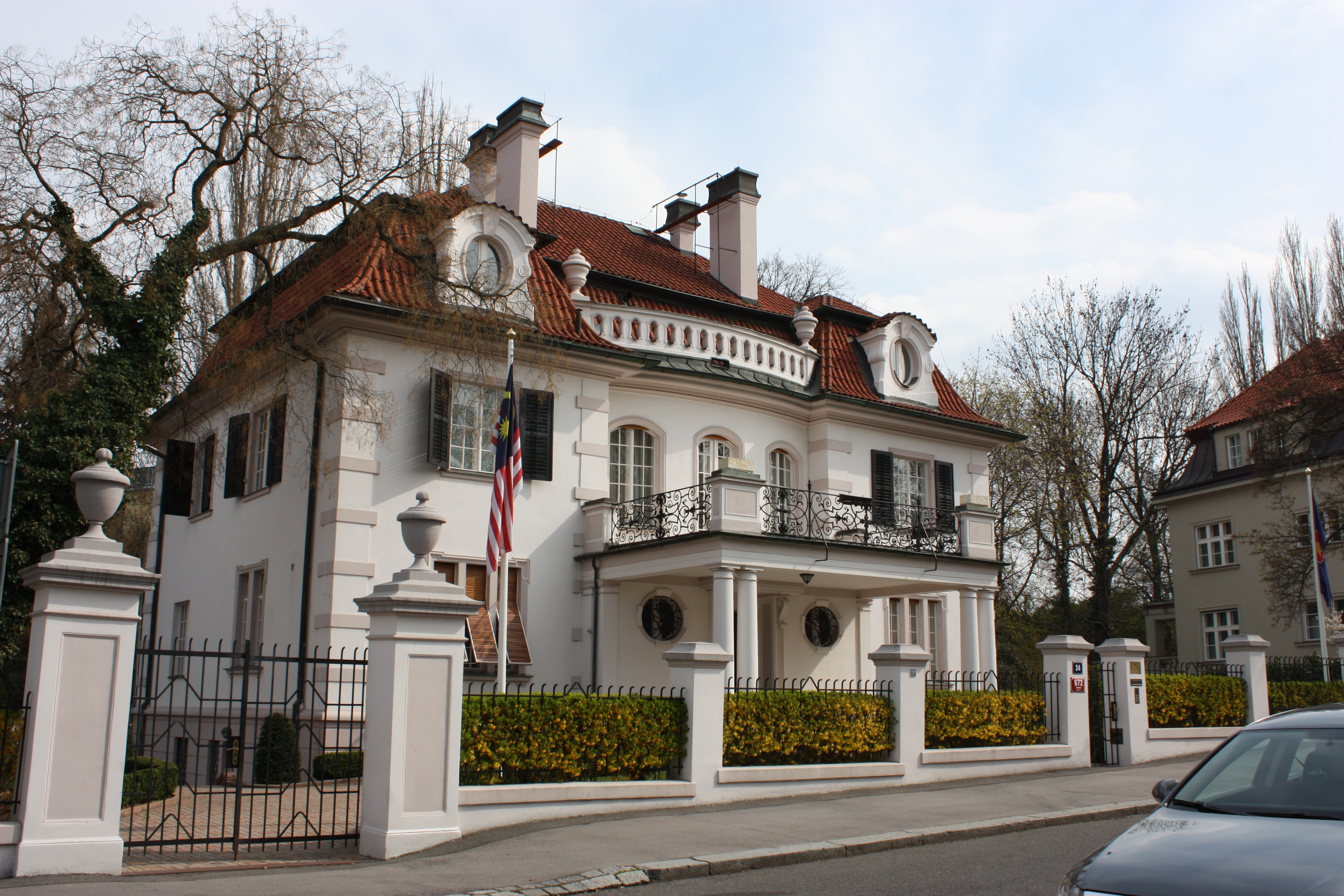
Residence of the Malaysian embassy in Prague

Relations between the two countries are developing successfully especially in trade with the Czech Republic main exports to Malaysia are engineering products, machine tools, and electrical motors while Malaysia main exports to the Czech Republic majority in machinery, rubber, cocoa and electrical equipment. In 2000, mutual trade between the two countries was over 7.7 billion CZK and Czech firms are currently seeking any opportunities for an investments and joint enterprises in Malaysia. Some Malaysian businessmen have also been coming to Prague to establishing contacts with Czech companies especially on the Sarawak Corridor of Renewable Energy (SCORE) projects.

== Education relations ==
In 2000, the Government of the Czech Republic has started to offers Malaysian one scholarship for post-graduate study every year, and in September 2006, the first group of seventy Malaysian students arrived in the Czech Republic and began their studies in medicine. Following the success, the number of Malaysian studies in the Czech Republic increased to 200 in 2008.

== See also ==
- Foreign relations of the Czech Republic
- Foreign relations of Malaysia
