= Czech Republic–Iran relations =

- Czech Republic: Iran

Czech Republic–Iran relations are bilateral relations between the Czech Republic and Iran.

== History ==
Czech–Iranian relations were established on April 30, 1929.

== Trade and economy ==
As of 2014, Czech firms mainly exported machinery products, electrical goods, and other products to Iran while the bulk of imports from Iran consisted of fruit and vegetables. The Czech Republic and Iran cooperate in nuclear technology and in fields of energy, mining and commerce.

== Diplomatic missions ==
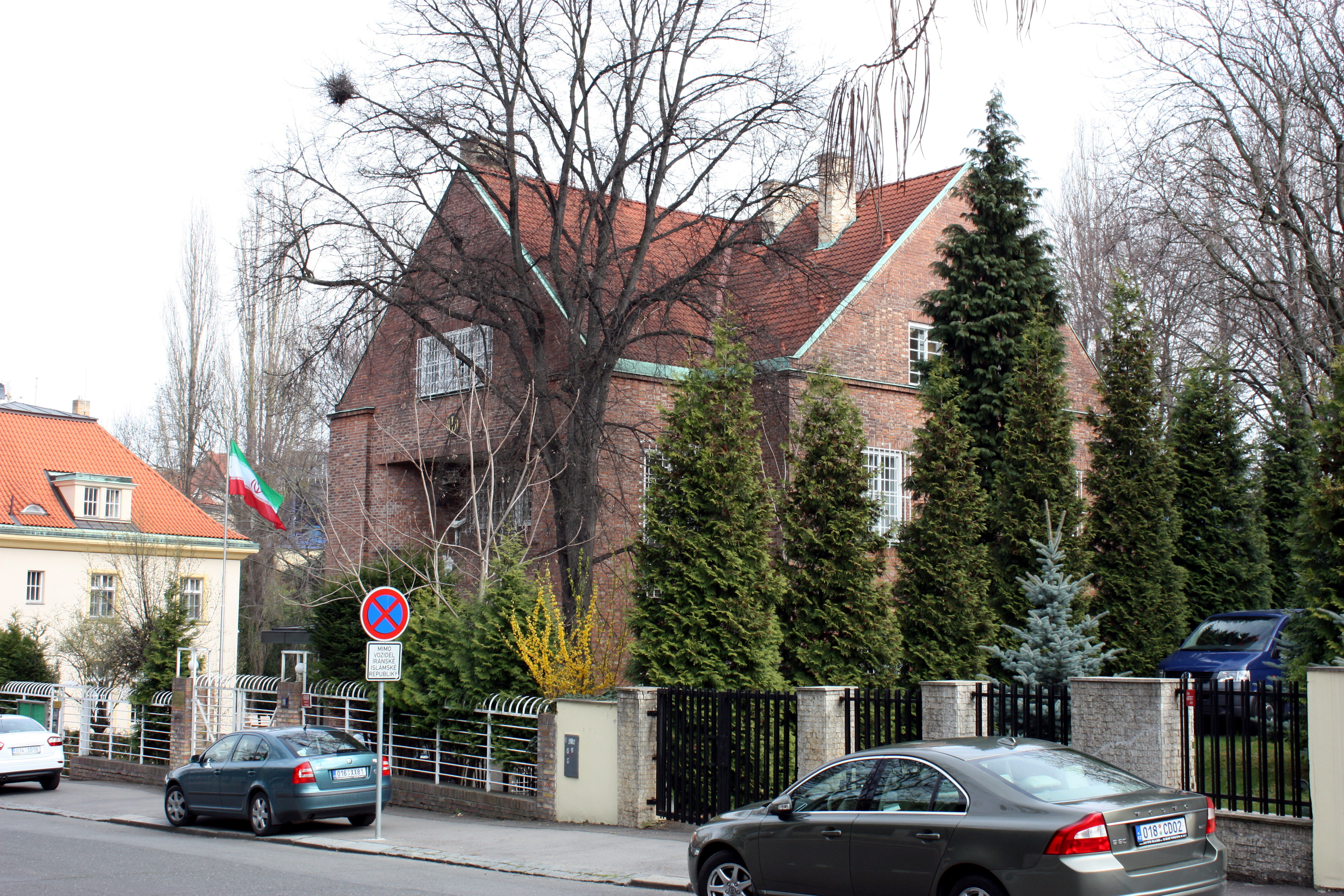
Iranian Embassy in Prague

- Iran has an embassy in Prague.
- Czech Republic has an embassy in Tehran.

== See also ==
- Foreign relations of the Czech Republic
- Foreign relations of Iran
