= Czech Republic–Spain relations =

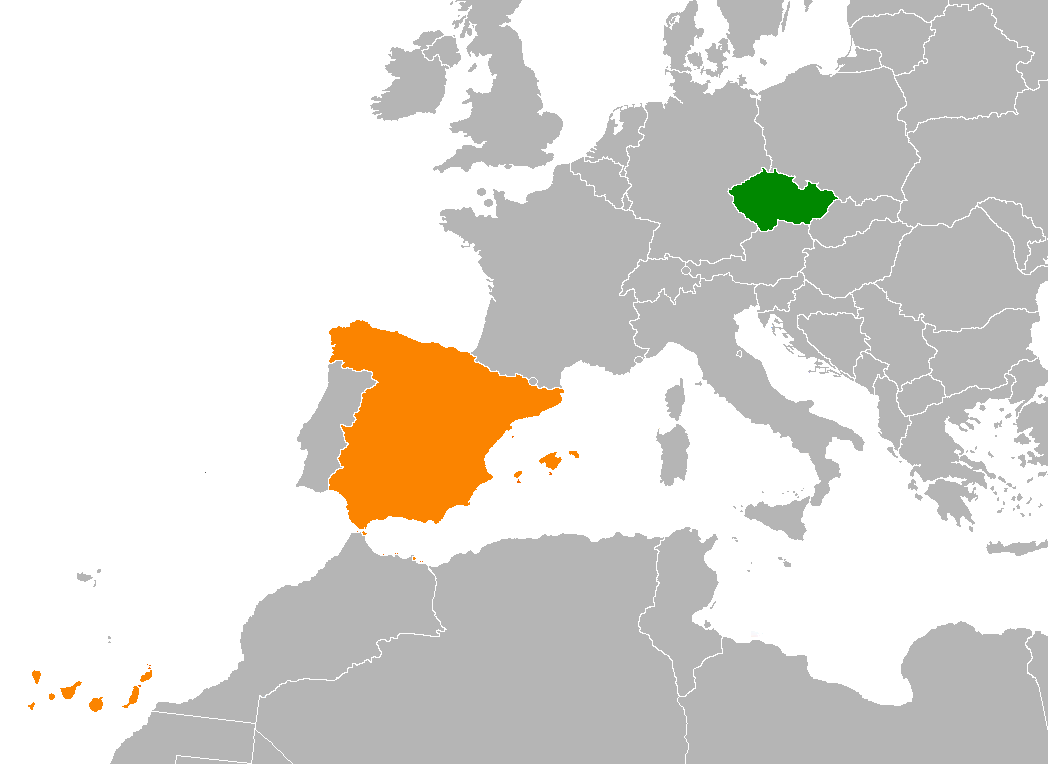
- Czech Republic: Spain

Czech Republic–Spain relations are the bilateral and diplomatic relations between these two countries. Relationships are mainly defined by the membership of both countries to the European Union and NATO. The Czech Republic has an embassy in Madrid and consulates in Barcelona, Benidorm, Bilbao, Oviedo, Palma de Mallorca and Santa Cruz de Tenerife. Spain has an embassy in Prague, as well as an Education Attaché, a Commercial Office and an Instituto Cervantes; the Delegation of Spanish Tourism for this country operates from Vienna. Spain gave full support to the Czech Republic's applications for membership in the European Union and NATO.

== Historical relations ==
Sons of King Philip I of Castile and Queen Joanna of Castile became Kings Charles I of Spain and Ferdinand I of Bohemia (Czechia) in 1516 and 1526, respectively. Afterwards, in 1526–1619 and 1620–1700, both countries were ruled by two closely related branches of the House of Habsburg. Prince Charles who unsuccessfully claimed the throne of Spain in the War of the Spanish Succession (1701–1715) following the death of his relative, Charles II of Spain, eventually became King Charles II of Bohemia in 1711.

During World War II, Spanish nationals, were among the prisoners of a subcamp of the Flossenbürg concentration camp operated by the German occupiers in Hradištko.

Diplomatic relations between the Czech Republic and Spain also have roots in the Spanish Civil War. José Antonio Valledor, a Spanish exile, played a key role in maintaining political connections in Czechoslovakia. After the war, Valledor, a communist militant, arrived in Czechoslovakia in 1949 and joined the Spanish exile community in Ústí nad Labem.

In this same time period, Czechoslovakia hosted exile to the Spanish Communist Party (PCE). From the 1940s, the Czechoslovak Communist Party (KSČ) financially supported the PCE's leadership and activities, including congresses, though funding was constrained by economic challenges. By the 1950s, the KSČ's limited resources strained this relationship, as Czechoslovakia faced foreign currency shortages and an inefficient economy. The PCE also sought support in the form of re-exporting Czechoslovak products via Venezuela to raise funds.

Czech-Spain relations have grown over time, with trade increasing steadily since the early 2000s. In 2009, Spain exported services worth $359M to Czechia. Bilateral trade has expanded, reaching $6.53B in Czech exports to Spain and $4.11B in Spanish exports to Czechia by 2023.

== Political relations ==
Jose Antonio Valledor's resistance to the Spanish Communist party’s (PCE's) decisions, including his relocation from Ústí to Prague, led to his expulsion from the PCE in 1955. In 1964, Czechoslovakia agreed to release 100,000 USD from a special fund to aid the PCE’s efforts in Spain.

The Czech Foreign Minister Karel Schwarzenberg visited Spain on February 16, 2012, meeting with his Spanish counterpart. The president of the Senate Pío García-Escudero traveled to Prague to participate in the state funeral of the former president Václav Havel on December 23, 2011.

On 8 February 2018, Czech President Miloš Zeman invited King Felipe VI of Spain to visit Prague, celebrating his 50th birthday and further strengthening the friendly political relationship between the countries.

== Economic relations ==
Jose Antonio Valledor, who initially worked as a translator for Czechoslovak Radio, became involved in a business venture with the Communist Party of Spain's (PCE's) support, running a lumber company. This company, though initially successful, became an economic burden for the PCE by 1950 due to his alleged mismanagement, leading to his relocation to Prague.

Efforts to develop commercial ties between Czechoslovakia and Spain were complicated, particularly in the 1950s, by the political risks of engaging with Franco's regime. Despite this, the PCE attempted to establish covert trade deals, such as the one involving Joaquín González Estarriol’s company, which aimed to represent Czechoslovak products in Spain. By the early 1960s, Czechoslovak-Spanish trade was still limited but saw some success, such as the export of oranges in 1960, though political sensitivities around the Franco regime continued to pose challenges.

Trade exchanges have grown intensely since 1993. From that year to 2013, Spanish exports to the Czech Republic have increased. multiplied by approximately 20 and Spanish imports from this country have multiplied by 30. The trade balance of Spain with the Czech Republic has traditionally been deficient, and the result of a commercial relationship based mainly in the industrial sector, which accounts for more than 30% of Czech GDP, and in which it has a long historical experience.

In 2023, Czechia exported $6.53B to Spain, primarily cars ($1.54B) and motor vehicle parts ($847M). Spain exported $4.11B to Czechia, with key products being motor vehicle parts ($465M) and cars ($432M). Czechia ranked 7th in Economic Complexity with an ECI of 1.6, while Spain ranked 31st with an ECI of 0.86. Czechia's exports to Spain increased by 3.02% annually since 2018.

== Cultural relations ==
The Cervantes Institute in Prague, inaugurated by King Felipe VI and Queen Letizia in 2006, is an important institution fostering cultural ties between the two nations.

== Resident diplomatic missions ==
- Czech Republic has an embassy in Madrid.
- Spain has an embassy in Prague.
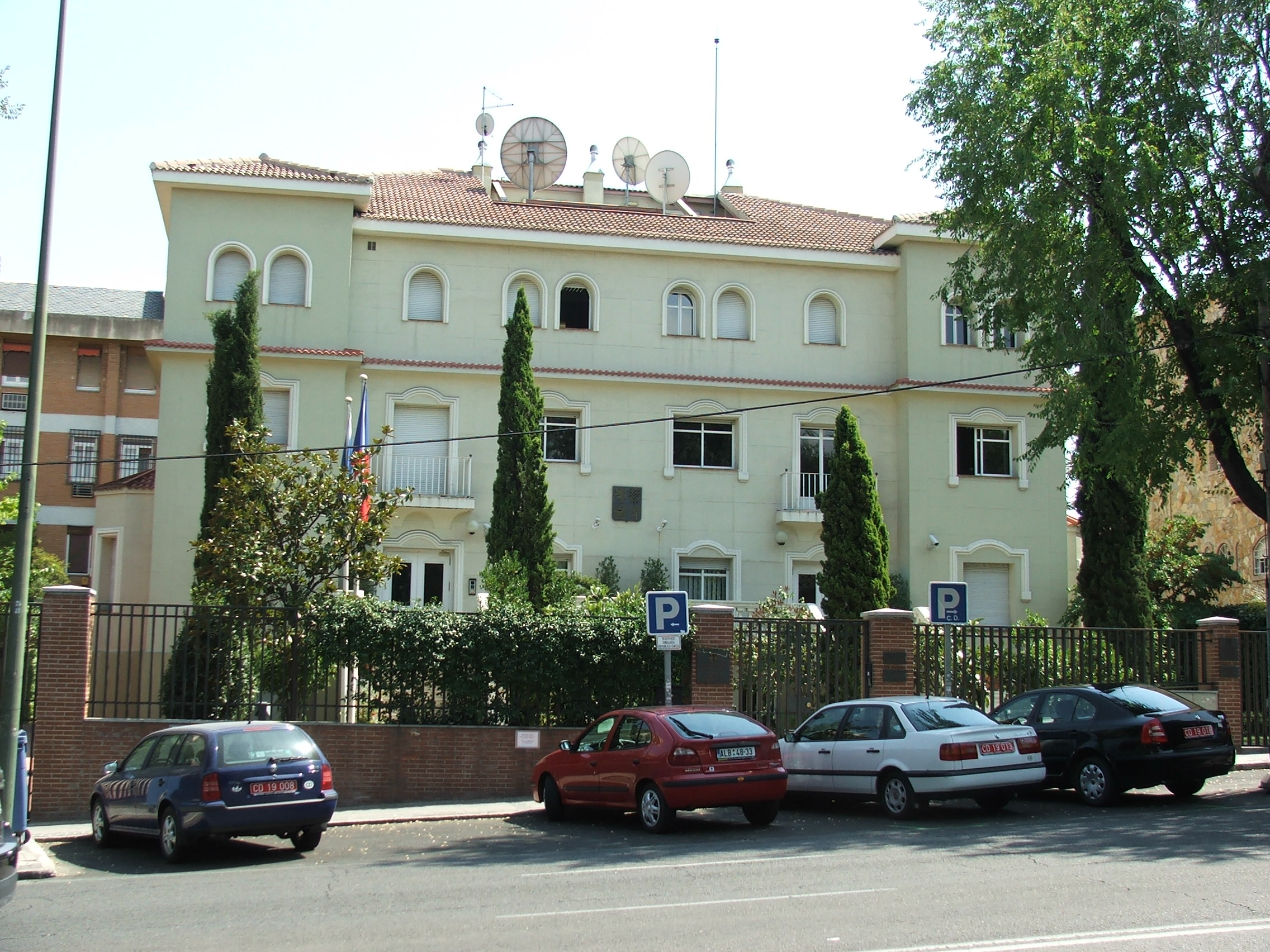
Embassy of the Czech Republic in Madrid

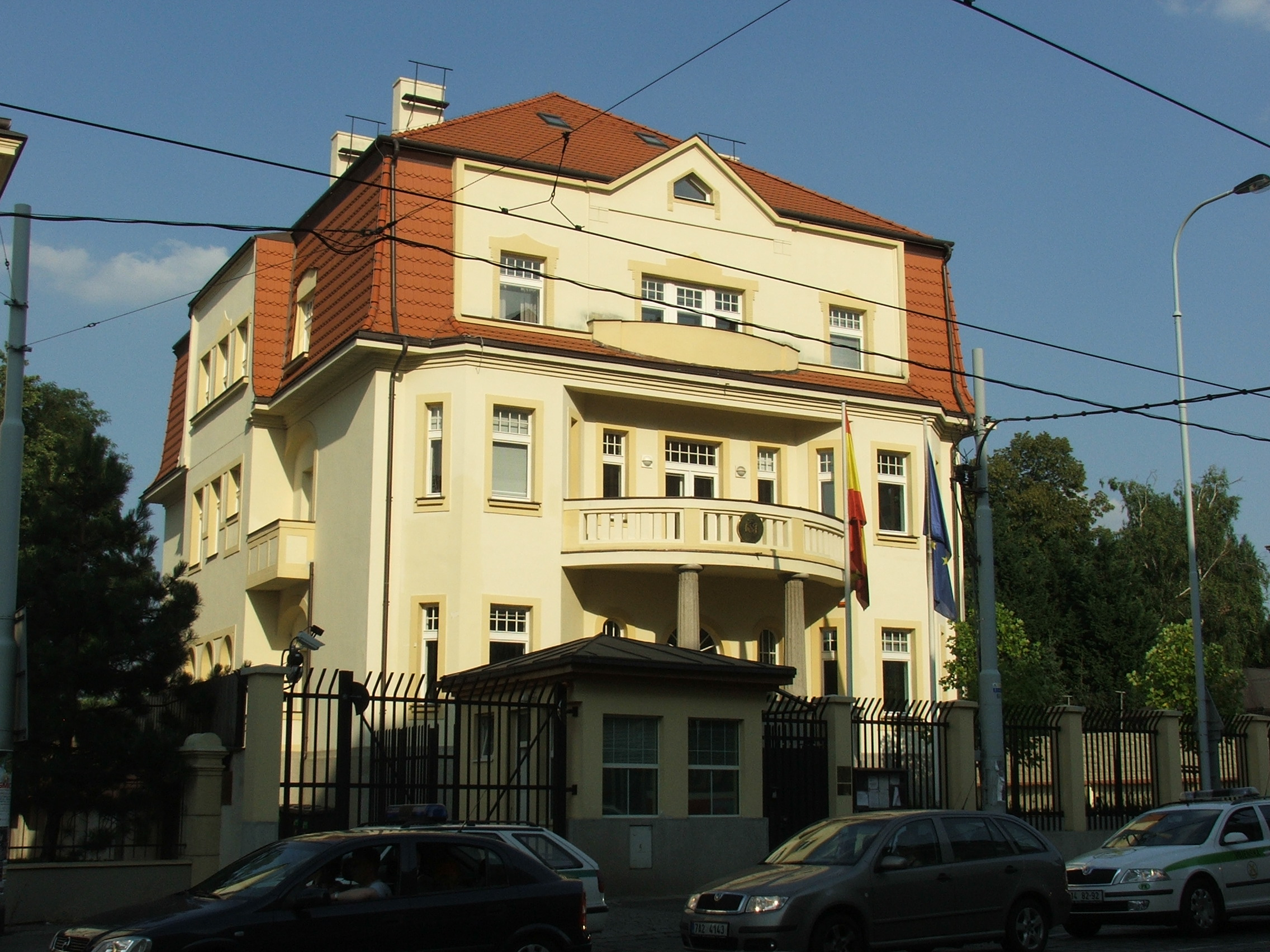
Embassy of Spain in Prague

== See also ==
- Foreign relations of the Czech Republic
- Foreign relations of Spain
- NATO-EU relations
- Accession of the Czech Republic to the EU
