= Bulgaria–Czech Republic relations =

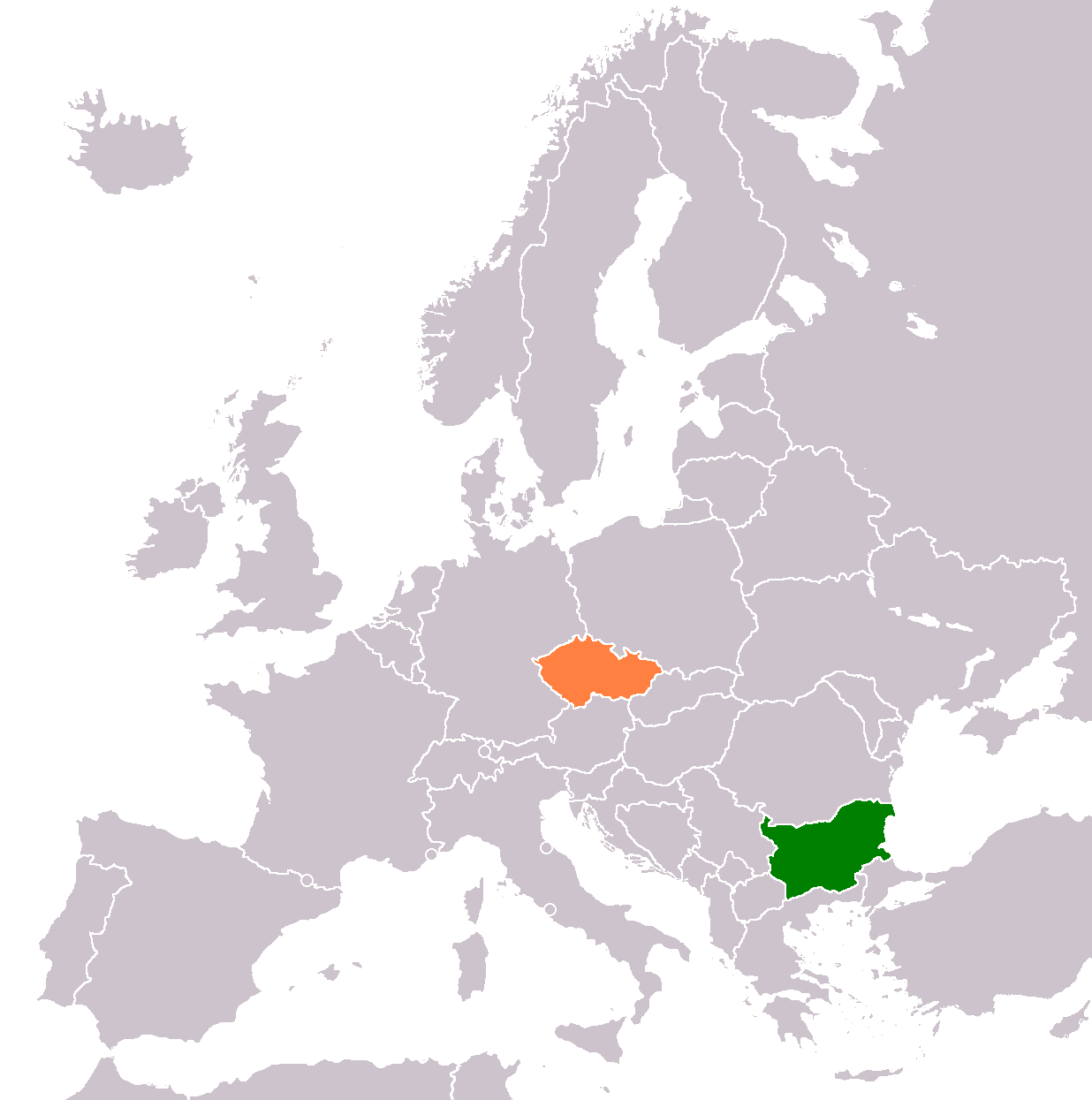

- Bulgaria: Czech Republic

Bulgaria–Czech Republic relations are foreign relations between Bulgaria and the Czech Republic. Diplomatic relations between Bulgaria and Czechoslovakia were established on 27 September 1920, after ratification of Neuilly treaty. They were severed on 1 June 1939 and were restored on 10 October 1945. Interwar relations were deeply influenced by Yugoslavia, Czechoslovak ally, but Bulgarian rival. Czechoslovakia had to balance between Bulgaria and Yugoslavia. The most important aspect of Bulgaria–Czechoslovakia relationship was trade. The Czechoslovak interwar export to Bulgaria varied between 3% and 11% of the Bulgarian import. Otherwise it was about 0.5%. Czechoslovak export was slowly forced out by Nazi Germany in the late thirties, but not as much as France or the United Kingdom.

On 23 December 1992, Bulgaria recognised the Czech Republic and established diplomatic relations with it at the level of embassies as of 1 January 1993. In 2020, Bulgaria and the Czech Republic celebrated 100 years of diplomatic relations.

Bulgaria has an embassy and an honorary consulate in Prague. The Czech Republic has an embassy in Sofia and an honorary consulate in Varna. Both nations are members of the NATO and EU and OSCE and COE. The Czech Republic has given full support to Bulgaria's membership in the EU.

== Resident diplomatic missions ==
- Bulgaria has an embassy in Prague.
- The Czech Republic has an embassy in Sofia.
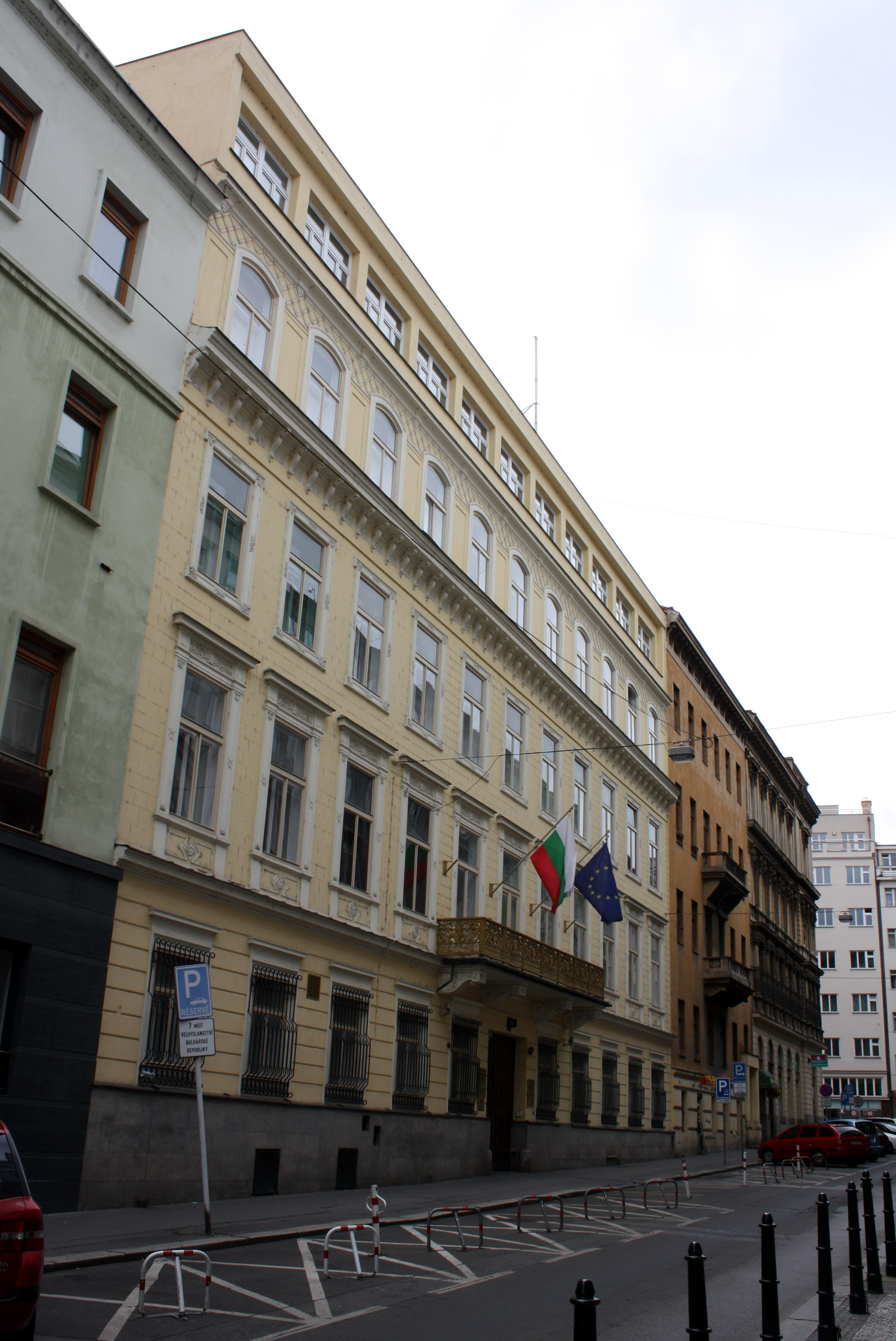
Embassy of Bulgaria in Prague

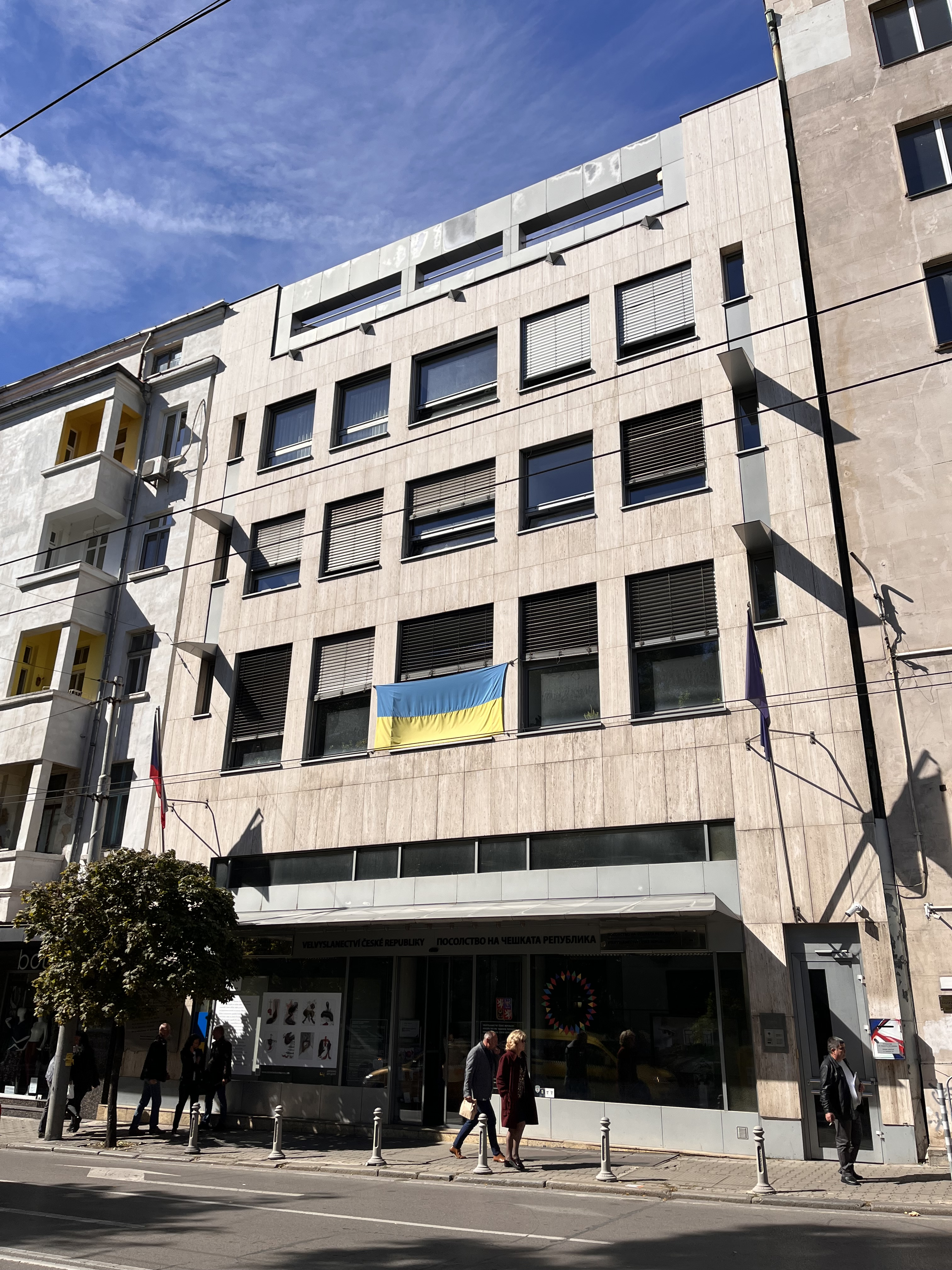
Embassy of the Czech Republic in Sofia

== See also ==
- Foreign relations of Bulgaria
- Foreign relations of the Czech Republic
- NATO-EU relations
- Accession of Bulgaria to the EU
