= Czech Republic–Netherlands relations =

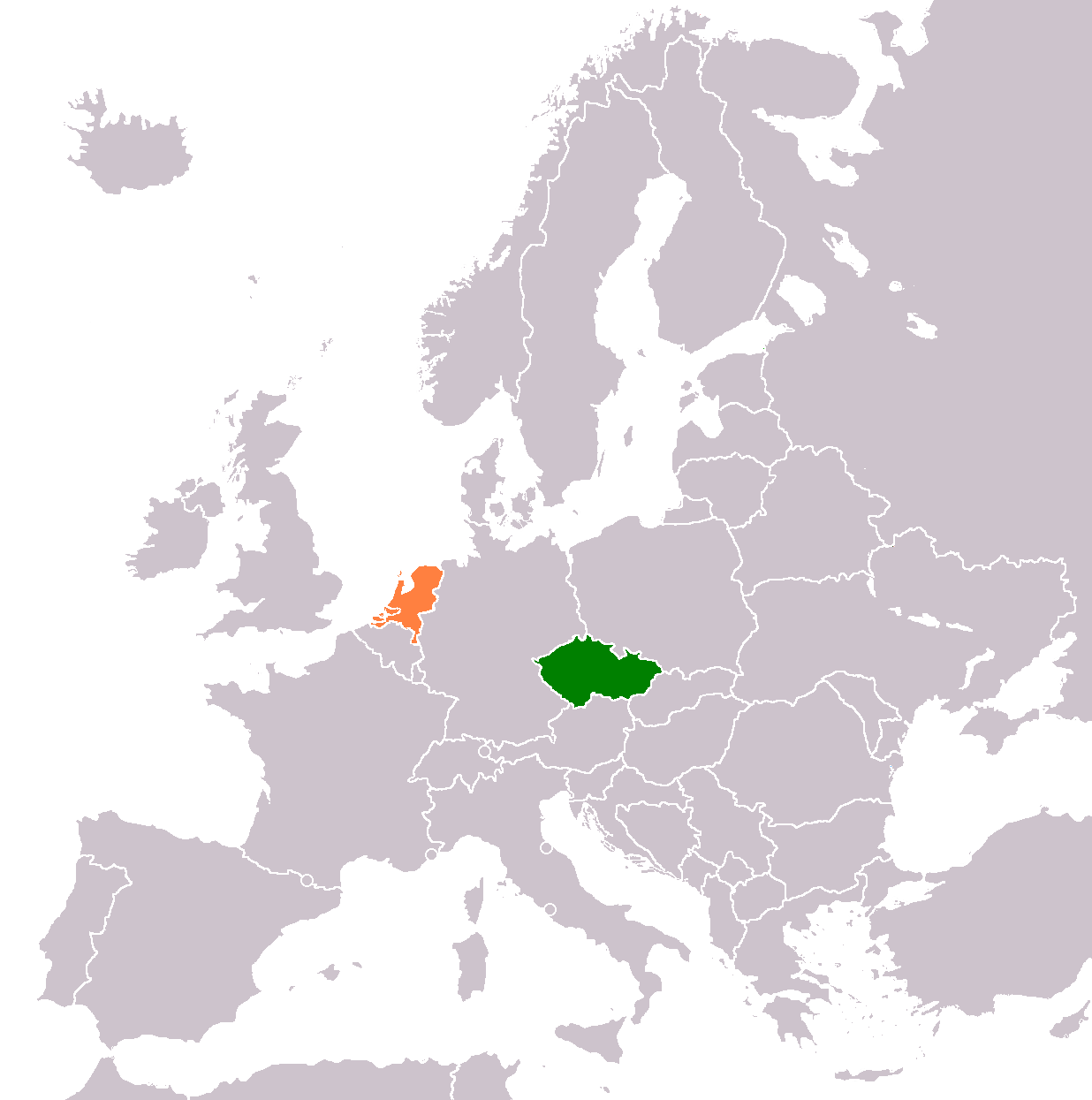
- Czech Republic: Netherlands

Diplomatic mission
- Embassy of the Netherlands, Prague: Embassy of the Czech Republic, The Hague

The Czech Republic and the Netherlands maintain a robust and multifaceted bilateral relationship, underpinned by shared democratic values, economic cooperation, cultural exchange, and joint participation in international organizations such as the European Union (EU) and the North Atlantic Treaty Organization (NATO).

== History ==
Diplomatic relations between the two nations were formally established on 13 November 1919. During World War II, ties were disrupted, but post-war efforts led to their restoration. The Cold War era saw limited interaction due to Czechoslovakia's alignment with the Eastern Bloc. However, the Velvet Revolution of 1989 marked a turning point, revitalizing bilateral relations and fostering closer cooperation in various sectors. on 1 January 1993, following the dissolution of Czechoslovakia, the Netherlands recognized the Czech Republic as an independent sovereign state. The first official state visit by a President of the Czech Republic to the Netherlands occurred in 1995, when President Václav Havel visited in his capacity as head of state.

== Economic relations ==
Economic ties between the Czech Republic and the Netherlands are strong and diverse. The Netherlands ranks among the top investors in the Czech Republic, with significant involvement in sectors such as energy, innovation, and the circular economy. As of 2021, the Netherlands was the Czech Republic's 8th largest export partner (€5.7 billion) and 9th largest import partner (€9 billion).

Collaborative initiatives focus on addressing shared challenges, including Energy transition, sustainable manufacturing, and mobility solutions. Organizations like the Czech Circular Hotspot play a pivotal role in promoting sustainable practices and facilitating business opportunities between the two countries.

=== Trade volume and rankings ===
Exports from the Netherlands to the Czech Republic

In January 2025, Dutch exports to the Czech Republic reached €799 million, marking a 6.96% increase from January 2024, when exports were €747 million.

Imports to the Netherlands from the Czech Republic

In 2024, the Netherlands imported goods worth approximately US$8.1 billion from the Czech Republic.

Trade Rankings

As of 2023, the Czech Republic accounted for 1.2% of the Netherlands' exports and 1.3% of its imports, highlighting its significance as a trading partner.

== Cultural relations ==
Cultural exchange is a cornerstone of Czech-Dutch relations. A bilateral Cultural Agreement signed in 1972 laid the foundation for ongoing cooperation in arts, education, and heritage preservation. Institutions such as the Czech Centre in Rotterdam actively promote Czech culture through exhibitions, concerts, and film screenings.

On 3, June 2025, King Willem-Alexander and his wife made history, as they made the first ever state visit of a Dutch Monarch to the Czech Republic. During their visit they will be christening a unique bell, crafted from melted-down Russian missile. The bell has been sent from the Netherlands to Prague's Old Town to be installed in the Church of the Most Sacred Heart of Our Lord.

== The European Union and NATO ==
While the Netherlands was one of the founding members of the European Union (EU), the Czech Republic joined the European Union (EU) in 2004. While the Netherlands was one of the founding members of NATO, the Czech Republic joined NATO in 1999.

== Diplomatic missions ==
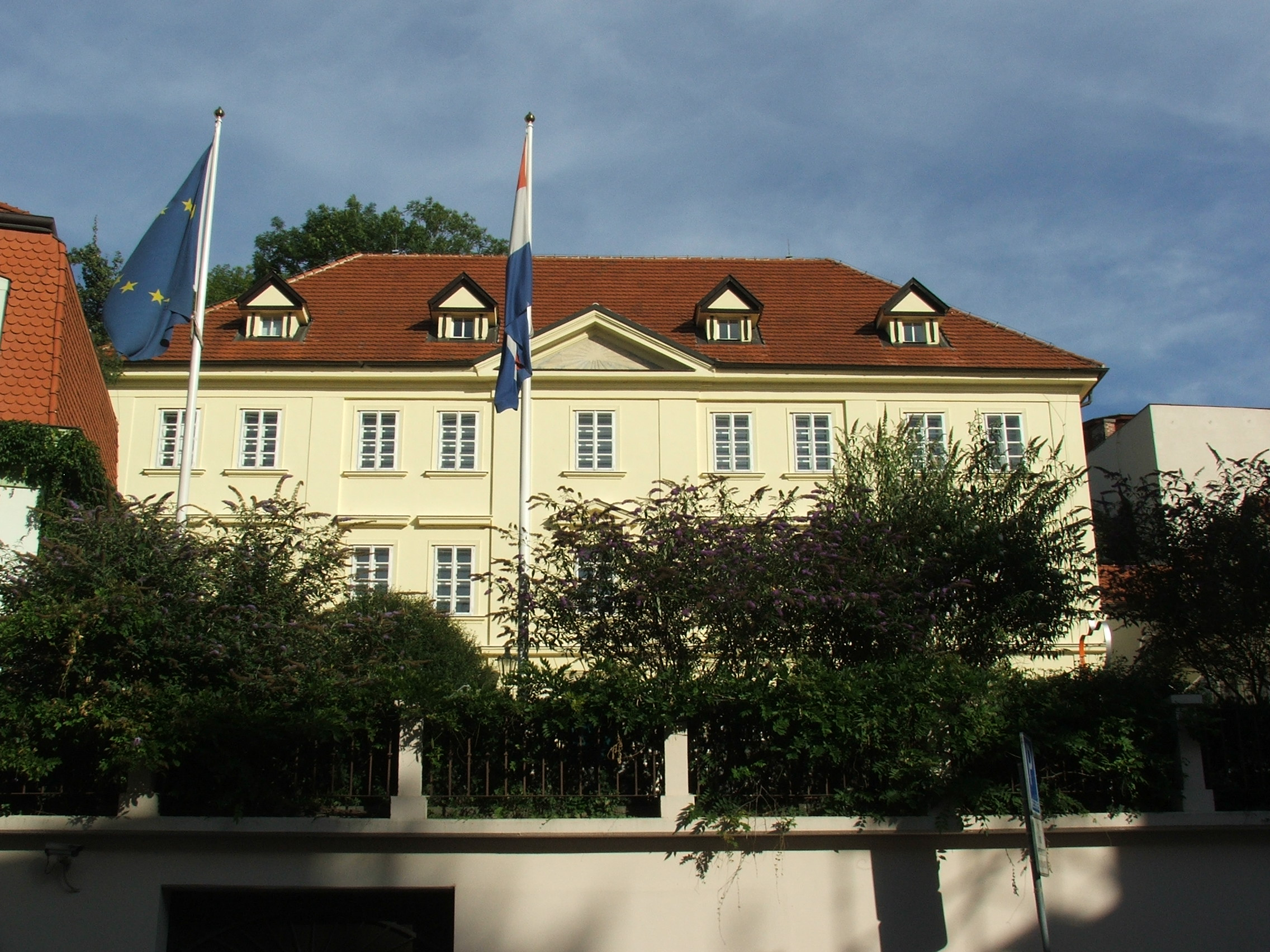
Embassy of the Netherlands in Prague

Both countries maintain diplomatic missions to facilitate bilateral cooperation. The Czech Republic has an embassy in The Hague and an honorary consulate in Amsterdam, while the Netherlands operates an embassy in Prague.

== See also ==
- Foreign relations of the Czech Republic
- Foreign relations of the Netherlands
- NATO-EU relations
