= Czech Republic–Denmark relations =

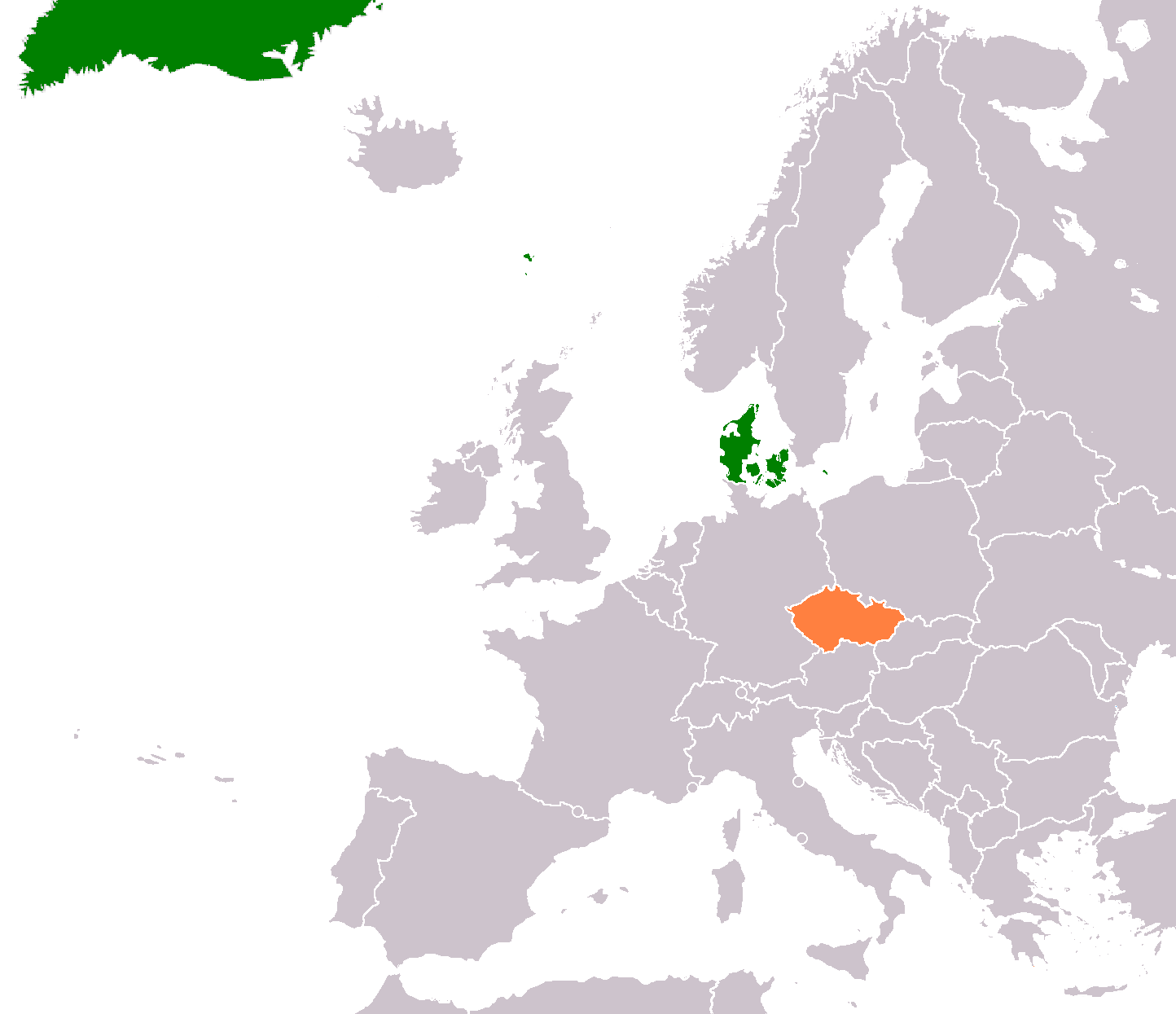
- Denmark: Czech Republic

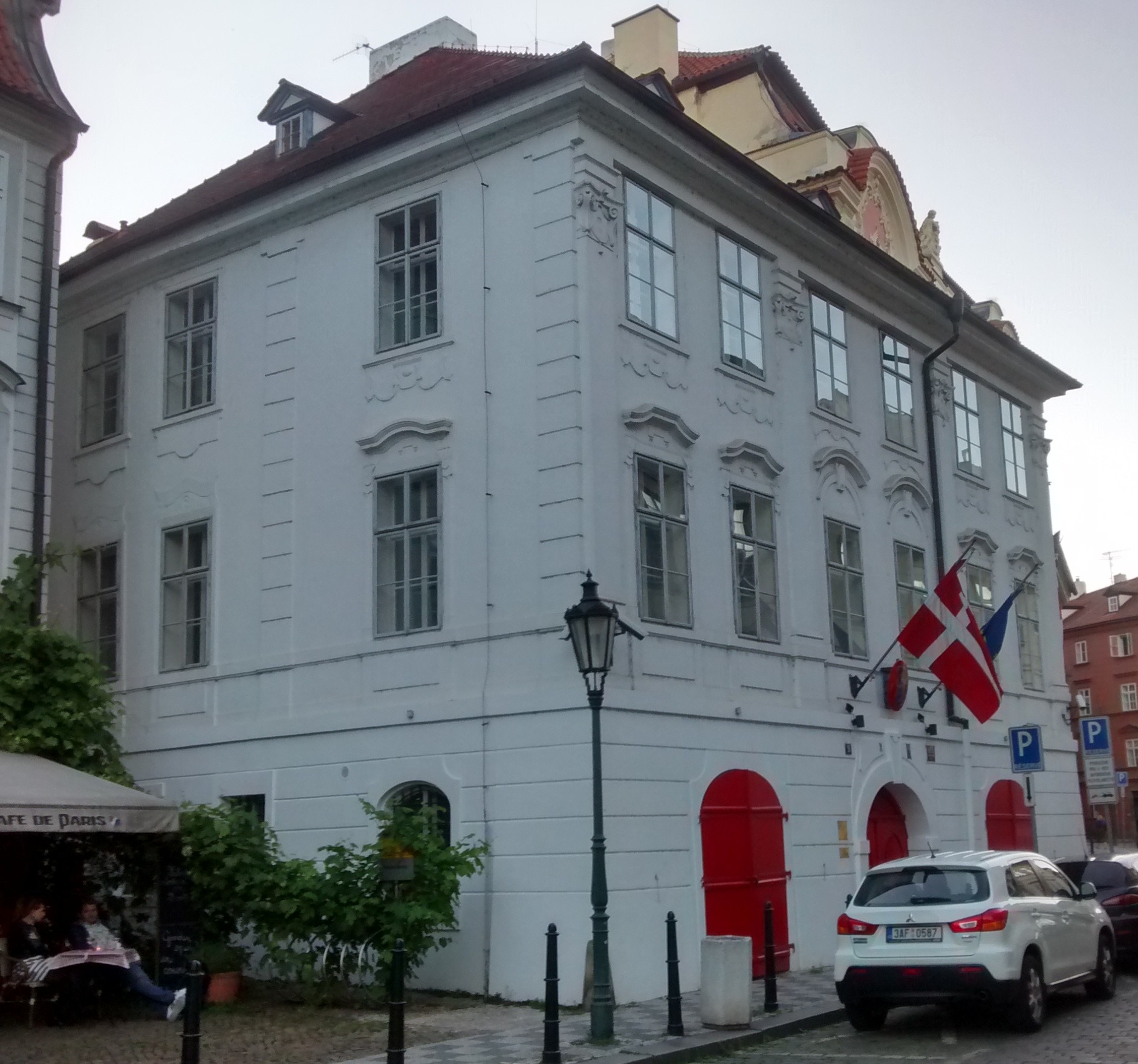
Embassy of Denmark in Prague

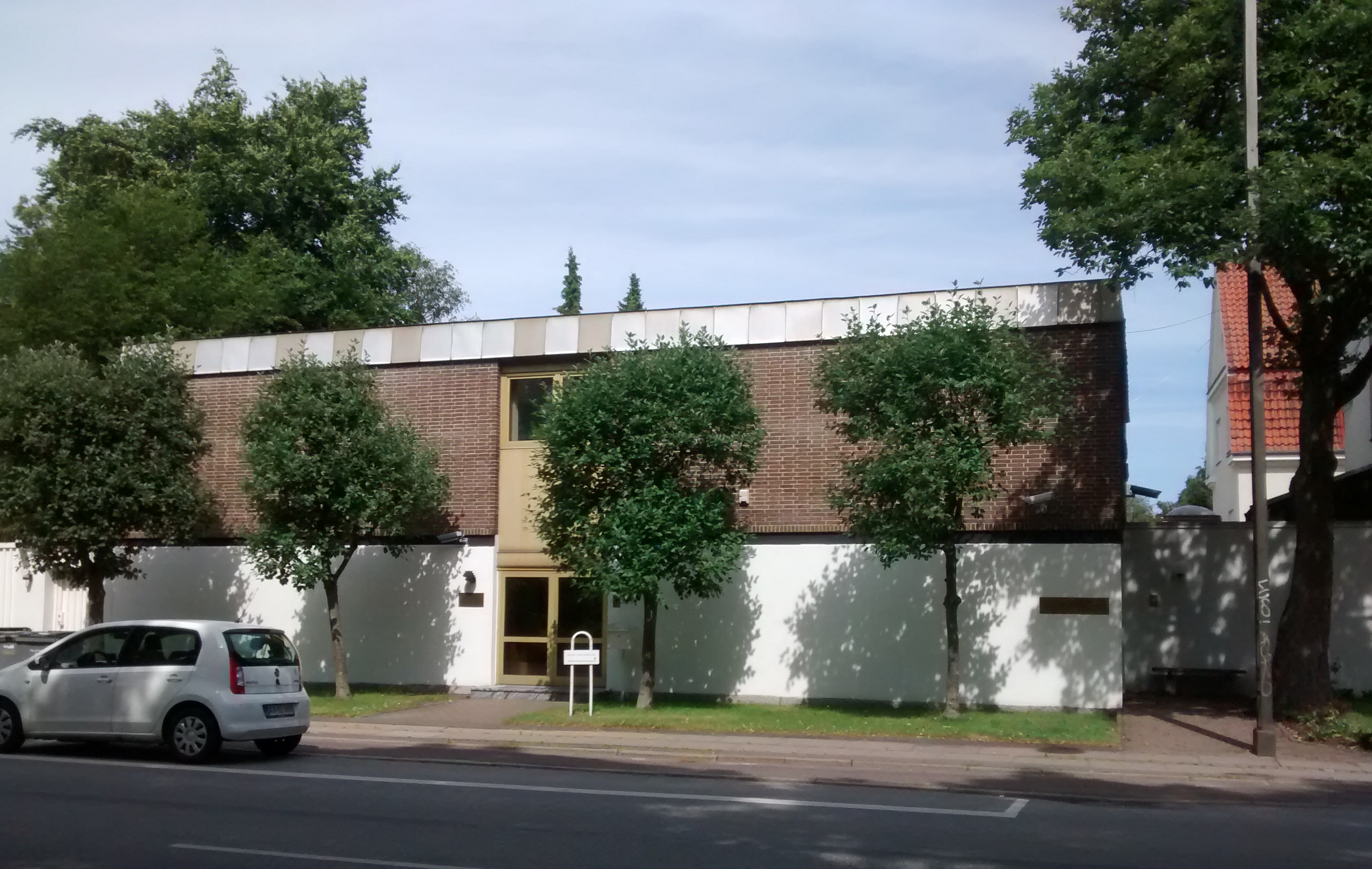
Embassy of the Czech Republic in Copenhagen

Czech Republic–Denmark relations are the current and historical relations between Czech Republic and Denmark. Czech Republic has an embassy in Copenhagen, while Denmark has an embassy in Prague. Diplomatic relations were established on 1 January 1993. Both countries are members of the European Union and NATO.

== Early history ==
The first contact between Czechoslovakia and Denmark occurred on 20 May 1919 when Czechoslovak President Edvard Beneš sent a note to Danish authorities asking them to recognize Czechoslovakia. Denmark responded to this positively on 25 May 1919 and Beneš went on to entrust diplomat Miroslav Plesinger-Božinov to open a representative office in Copenhagen. He presented his credentials on 27 May 1920. On 14 August 1920, the representative office was upgraded to an embassy and diplomatic relations were established on 4 September 1920. Plesinger-Božinov presented his credentials as ambassador to King Christian X on 24 September 1920. Denmark, at first, brought Czechoslovakia under the jurisdiction of the Danish embassy in Vienna but Foreign Minister Scavenius told the Czechoslovak ambassador that a Danish embassy would open in the future. Paul Nørgaard served as the first Danish ambassador to Czechoslovakia, presenting his credentials on 19 May 1921. The two countries immediately worked on strengthening cultural and trade relations and established the Danish-Czechoslovak Chamber of Commerce in Copenhagen. Czechoslovak Minister of Trade Ladislav Novák also visited Denmark to study the economic conditions to negotiate a trade agreement.

== High level visits ==
In 1994, Queen Margrethe II of Denmark visited Czech Republic, and in 2006 the Czech president Václav Klaus visited Copenhagen.

== Ambassadors ==
List of Czech ambassadors to Denmark:

#	Officeholder	Term start date
1	Miroslav Plesinger-Božinov	27 May 1920; 24 September 1920
2	Bohdan Pavlů	11 February 1927
3	Čeněk Ibl	20 July 1936
4	Zdeněk Němeček	22 November 1945
5	Vladimír Natula	3 June 1949
6	Karel Lukeš	11 February 1952
7	Jaroslav Reimoser	5 March 1955
8	Emil Hršel	16 September 1960; 7 November 1963
9	Jaroslav Šmíd	27 August 1964
10	Antonín Vasek	11 December 1969
11	Jiří Skoumal	24 November 1971
12	František Mika	8 April 1976
13	Stanislav Matonoha	17 September 1980
14	Alojz Kusalík	19 May 1983
15	Ľudovít Pezlár	3 November 1988
16	Hana Ševčíková	25 January 1991
17	Alois Buchta	9 November 1995
18	Marie Košťálová	10 March 2000
19	Ivan Jančárek	25 October 2004
20	Zdeněk Lyčka	7 July 2008
21	Jiří Brodský	8 October 2013
22	Radek Pech	29 September 2017
23	Jiří Ellinger	15 December 2023

List of Danish ambassadors to the Czech Republic

#	Officeholder	Term start date
1	Paul Nørgaard	19 May 1921
2	Niels Johan Wulfsberg Høst	21 September 1923
3	Eigil Leth	27 May 1938
4	Peter Oluf Treschow	29 January 1946
5	Karl I. Eskelund	1 July 1951
6	Birger Dons Møller	1 March 1955
7	P. Jensen	13 January 1967
8	Hans Severin Møller	1 April 1969
9	Gustav Skjold Mellbin	4 September 1974
10	Hans Jespersen	1 August 1984
11	C. Lose	11 July 1988
