= Czech Mongolian =

Czech Mongolian or Mongolian Czech may refer to:

- Czech Republic–Mongolia relations
- Czechs in Mongolia
- Mongolians in the Czech Republic
- Multiracial people of Czech and Mongolian descent
