= Demographics of the Czech Republic =

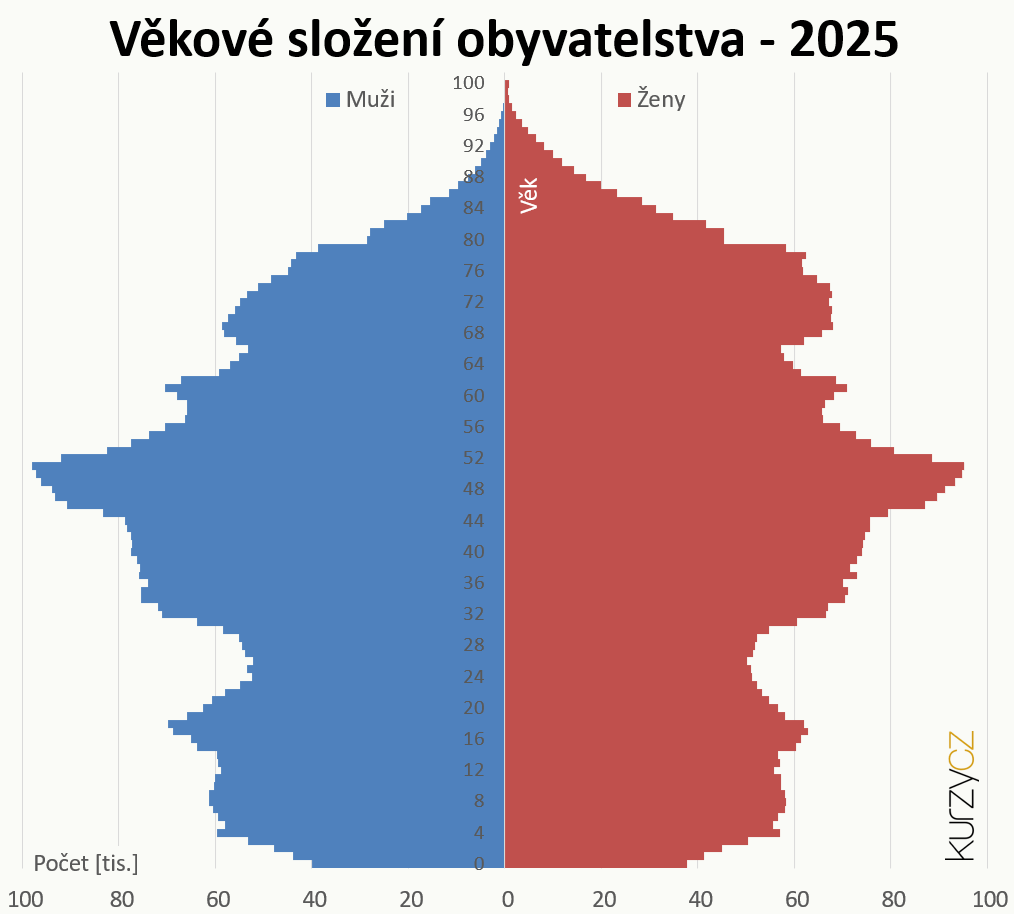
- Czech Republic population pyramid in 2025
- Population: ▲10,915,839 (1 January 2026)
- Growth rate: 0.004% (2020)
- Birth rate: ▼9.5 births/1,000 population (2022)
- Death rate: ▼11.4 deaths/1,000 population (2022)
- Life expectancy: 79.3 years (2020)
  - male: 76.3 years (2020)
  - female: 82.4 years (2020)
- Fertility rate: ▼1.45 children born/woman (2023)
- Infant mortality: 2.6 deaths/1,000 live births (2020)
- Net migration rate: 2.3 migrant(s)/1,000 population (2020)
- Immigrant share: 9.5% (2024)

Age structure
- 0–14 years: ▼15.5 % (2024)
- 15–64 years: ▲63.8 % (2024)
- 65 and over: ▲20.7 % (2024)

Sex ratio
- Total: 0.97 male(s)/female (2018)

Nationality
- Nationality: noun: Czech(s); adjective: Czech
- Major ethnic: 96.5% to mostly 99.6% of the country's population is White European, and/or 3.5%-0.4% minorities. Czech 64.3% (2011) (Note: In 2011 a large part of the population did not claim any ethnicity, before the census it was widely mediatized that the question is not mandatory. The vast majority of those who did so are presumed to be ethnic Czechs, number of whom dropped by roughly the same amount that the number of undeclared people rose, circa 2.5 million. If the percentage of those who did not answer the question is added to the total percentage Czech amount, the total percentage of Czech's is estimated to be 89.7% of the population.)
- Minor ethnic: Moravian 5%; Slovak 1.4%; other 1.8%; unspecified 27.5%; (2011)

Language
- Official: Czech
- Spoken: Czech (official) 95.4%; Slovak 1.6%; other 3%; (2011 census)

Demographic features of the population of the Czech Republic include population density, ethnicity, education level, health of the population, economic status, and religious affiliations.

== Population ==
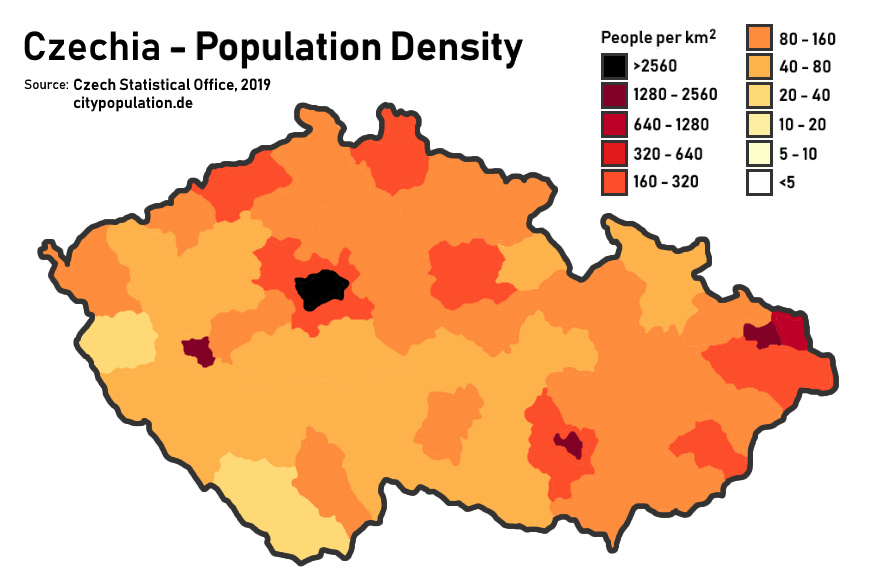
Population density in the Czech Republic by district

With an estimated population of 10.5 million as of 2022, compared to 9.3 million at the beginning of the 20th century, the population growth of the Czech Republic has been limited, due to low fertility rates and loss of population in and around World Wars I and II. Population loss during World War I was approximately 350,000. At the beginning of World War II the population of the Czech Republic reached its maximum (11.2 million). Due to the expulsion of the German residents after World War II, the Czech Republic lost about 3 million inhabitants and in 1947 the population was only 8.8 million. Population growth resumed, and in 1994 the population was 10.33 million.

From 1994 to 2003 natural growth was slightly negative (−0.15% per year) and the population decreased to 10.2 million. Since 2005, natural growth has been positive, but in recent times the most important influence on the population of the Czech Republic has been immigration: approximately 300,000 during the 2010s.

- One birth every 5 minutes
- One death every 5 minutes
- One net migrant every 44 minutes
- Net gain of one person every 131 minutes

The Czech Republic has a population density of about 134 inhabitants per square kilometre, which is above the European average. The areas with the lowest population density are located along the mountainous southwestern and southern borders of the country. These regions were significantly affected by the displacement of the German population after World War II.

=== Total population ===
Historical population

Year	Pop.	±%
1790	4,444,000	—
1800	4,659,000	+4.8%
1810	4,870,000	+4.5%
1820	5,272,791	+8.3%
1830	5,996,778	+13.7%
1840	6,378,071	+6.4%
1850	6,826,465	+7.0%
1860	7,277,801	+6.6%

Year	Pop.	±%
1869	7,617,230	+4.7%
1880	8,222,013	+7.9%
1890	8,665,421	+5.4%
1900	9,372,214	+8.2%
1910	10,078,637	+7.5%
1921	10,009,587	−0.7%
1930	10,674,386	+6.6%
1950	8,896,133	−16.7%

Year	Pop.	±%
1961	9,571,531	+7.6%
1970	9,807,697	+2.5%
1980	10,291,927	+4.9%
1991	10,302,215	+0.1%
2001	10,230,060	−0.7%
2011	10,436,560	+2.0%
2021	10,524,167	+0.8%

Since 1869, the data come from the censuses.
Source: Czech Demographic Handbook

=== Life expectancy ===
total population: 79.5 years. Country comparison to the world: 56th
male: 76.55 years
female: 82.61 years (2021 est.)

Death rate

10.72 deaths/1,000 population (2021 est.) Country comparison to the world: 23rd

Average life expectancy at age 0 of the total population.

Life expectancy since 1875

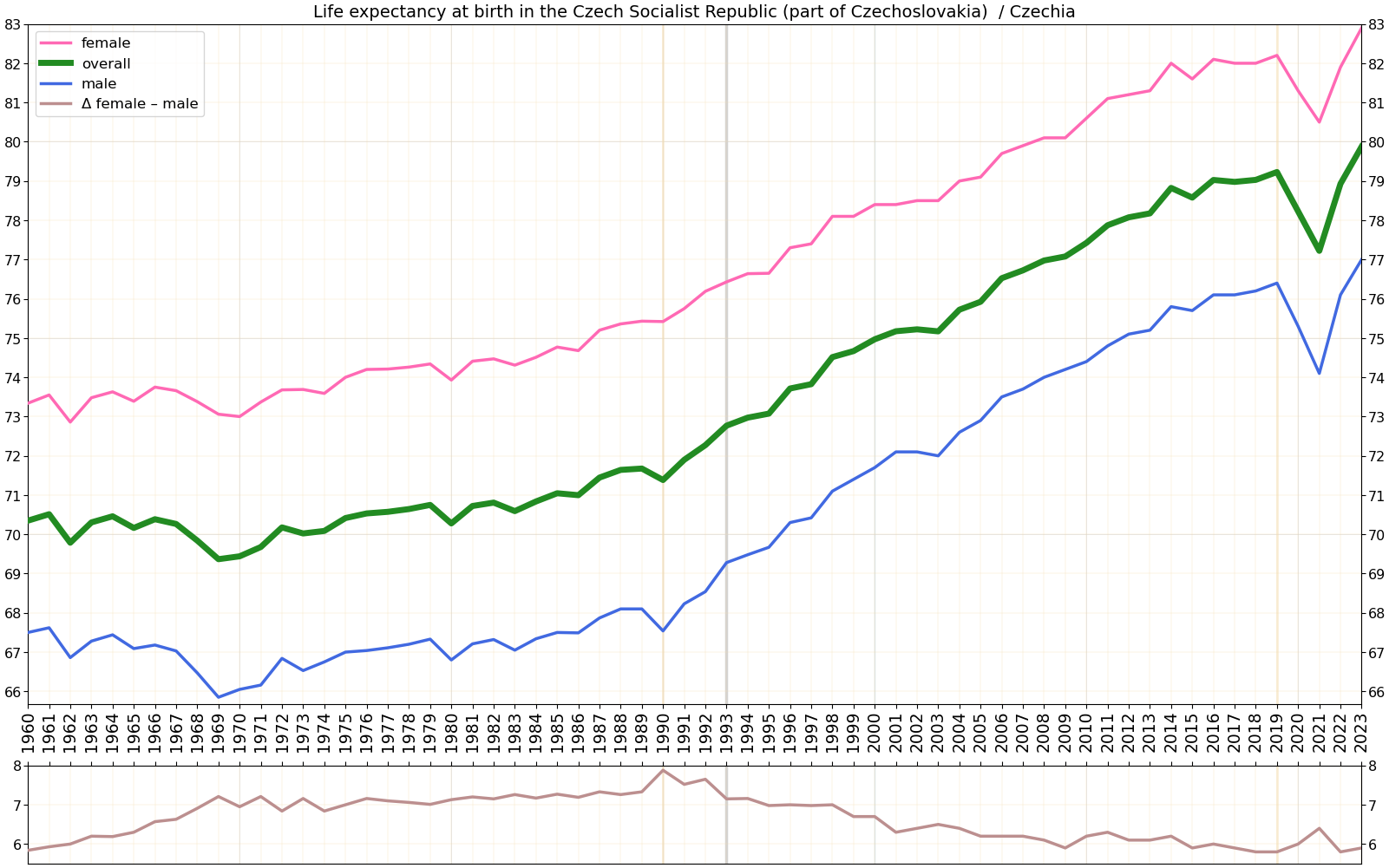
Life expectancy since 1960 by gender

Period	Life expectancy in years
1950–1955	66.86
1955–1960	▲69.59
1960–1965	▲70.35
1965–1970	▼69.99
1970–1975	▲70.04
1975–1980	▲70.64
1980–1985	▲70.78
1985–1990	▲71.46
1990–1995	▲72.50
1995–2000	▲74.23
2000–2005	▲75.54
2005–2010	▲76.98
2010–2015	▲78.17

=== Fertility ===
Total Fertility Rate in Czech Republic
1860	1861	1862	1863	1864	1865	1866	1867	1868	1869
5.07	5.07	5.08	5.09	5.10	5.10	5.11	5.12	5.13	5.14
1870	1871	1872	1873	1874	1875	1876	1877	1878	1879
5.14	5.14	5.13	5.12	5.11	5.10	5.09	5.08	5.07	5.07
1880	1881	1882	1883	1884	1885	1886	1887	1888	1889
5.06	5.04	5.03	5.02	5.00	4.99	4.97	4.96	4.95	4.93
1890	1891	1892	1893	1894	1895	1896	1897	1898	1899
4.92	4.91	4.90	4.90	4.89	4.88	4.88	4.87	4.86	4.85

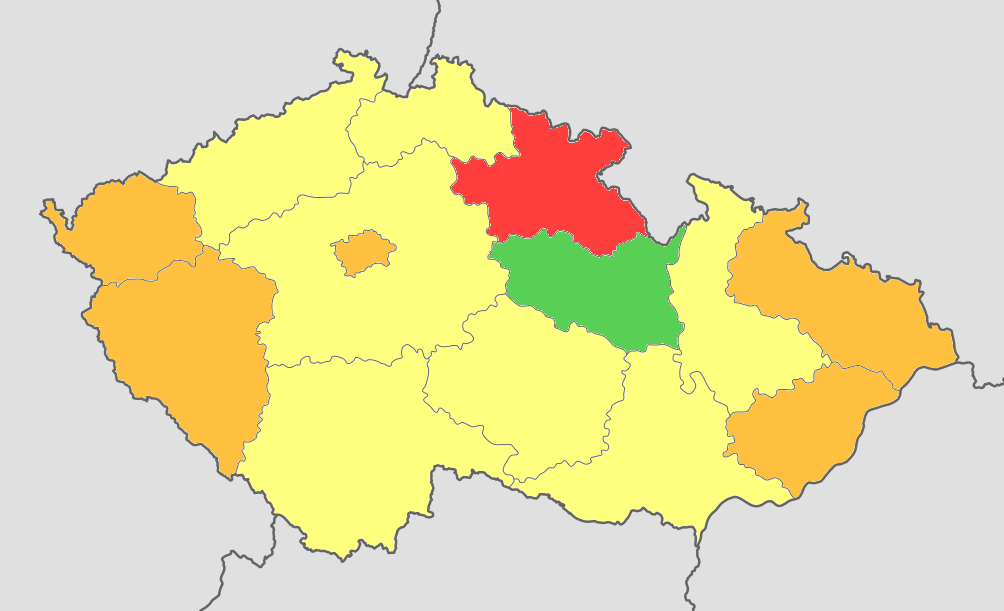
Czech Republic total fertility rate by region (2014) Birth rate :8.75 births/1,000 population (2021 est.) Country comparison to the world: 207th Total fertility rate :1.83 children born/woman (2021 est.) Country comparison to the world: 205th Mother's mean age at first birth :28.5 years (2019 est.) 1.9 – 2.1 1.7 – 1.9 1.5 – 1.7 1.4 – 1.5 1.3 – 1.4 < 1.3

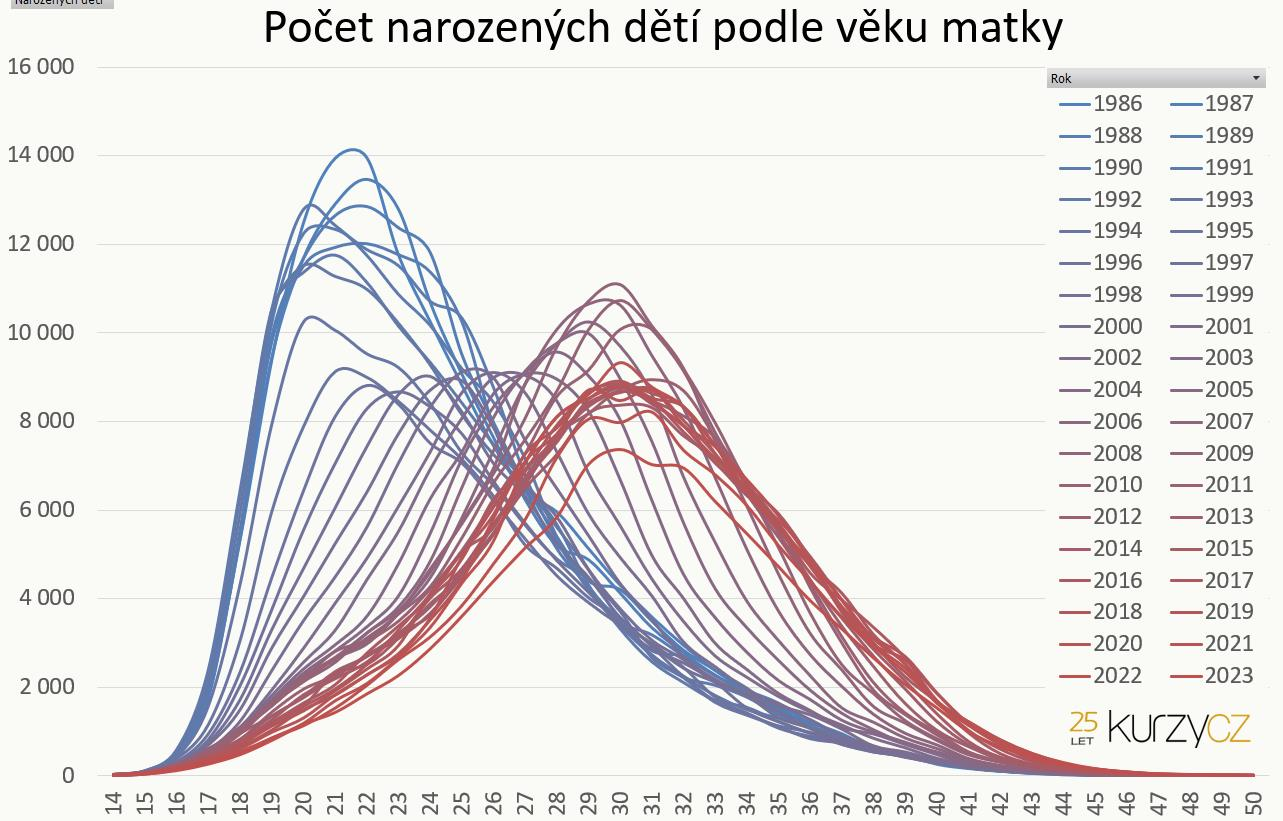
Number of children by mother's age

=== Population density and urban areas ===
City	Population (2026)	Area (km²)	Region
Prague	1,407,084	496	Prague
Brno	404,296	230	South Moravian
Ostrava	280,853	214	Moravian-Silesian
Plzeň	187,863	138	Plzeň
Liberec	108,214	106	Liberec
Olomouc	105,297	103	Olomouc

=== Age structure ===
2020
0–14 years: 15.17% (male 834,447 /female 789,328)
15–24 years: 9.2% (male 508,329 /female 475,846)
25–54 years: 43.29% (male 2,382,899 /female 2,249,774)
55–64 years: 12.12% (male 636,357 /female 660,748)
65 years and over: 20.23% (male 907,255 /female 1,257,515)

Age structure by the generation groups (December 31, 2025)
Greatest Generation (1901–1927)	Silent Generation (1928–1945)	Baby boomers (1946–1964)	Generation X (1965–1980)	Generation Y (1981–1996)	Generation Z (1997–2012)	Generation Alpha (2013–2024)	Generation Beta (2025–)
3,078	538,543	2,245,668	2,599,827	2,267,688	1,847,302	1,335,891	77,842

Median age

- total: 43.3 years. Country comparison to the world: 28th
- male: 42 years
- female: 44.7 years (2020 est.)
Age structure over time

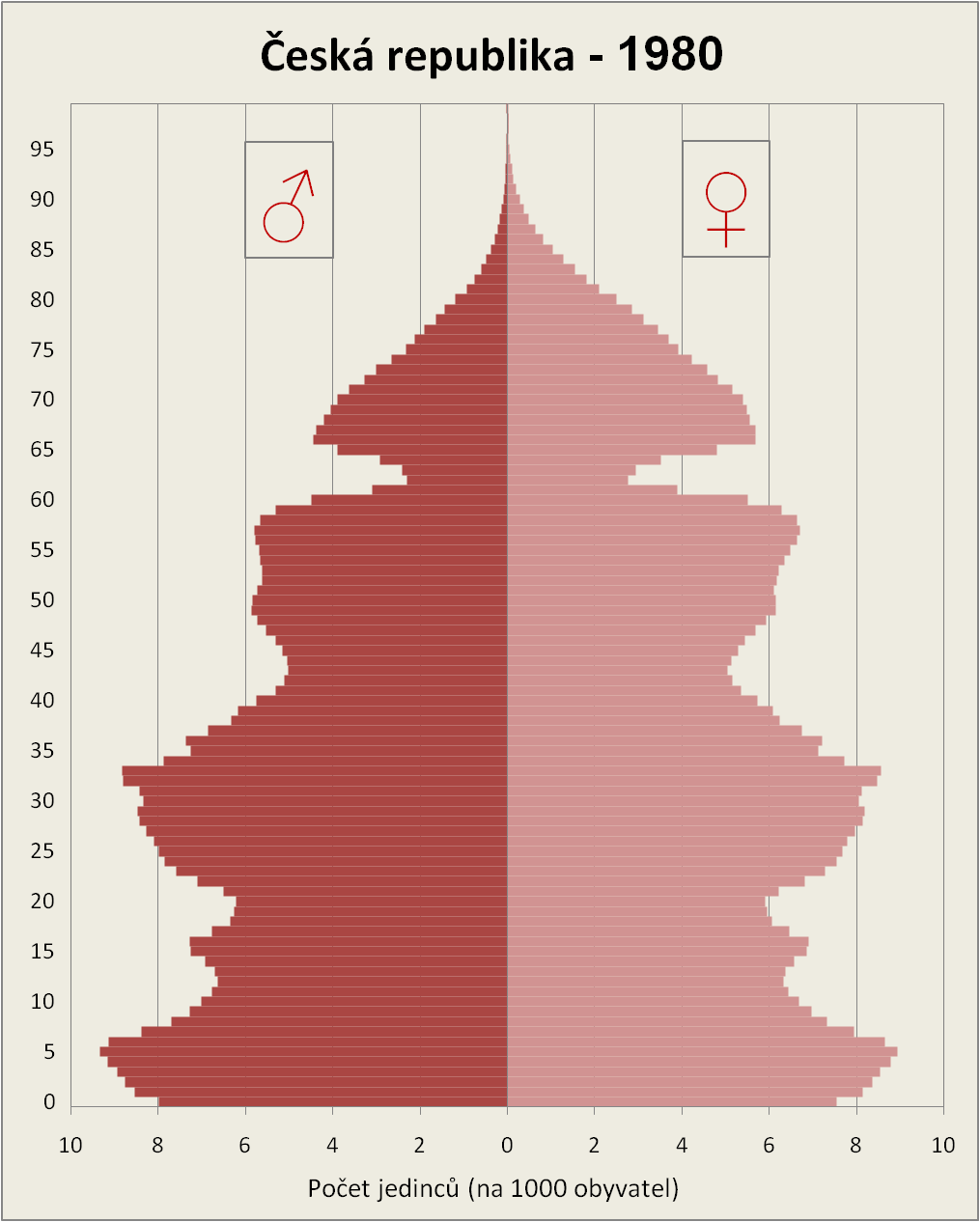
1980

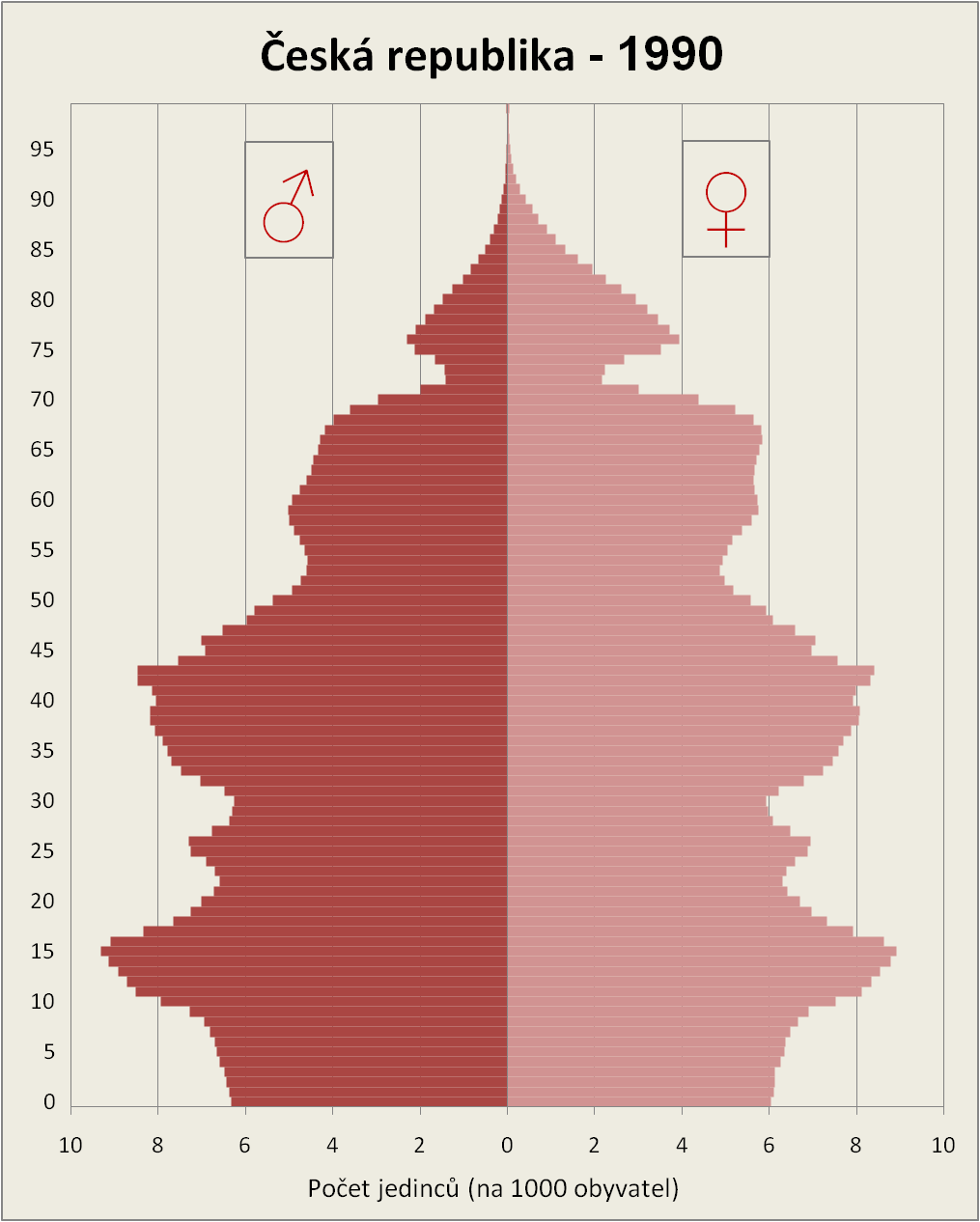
1990

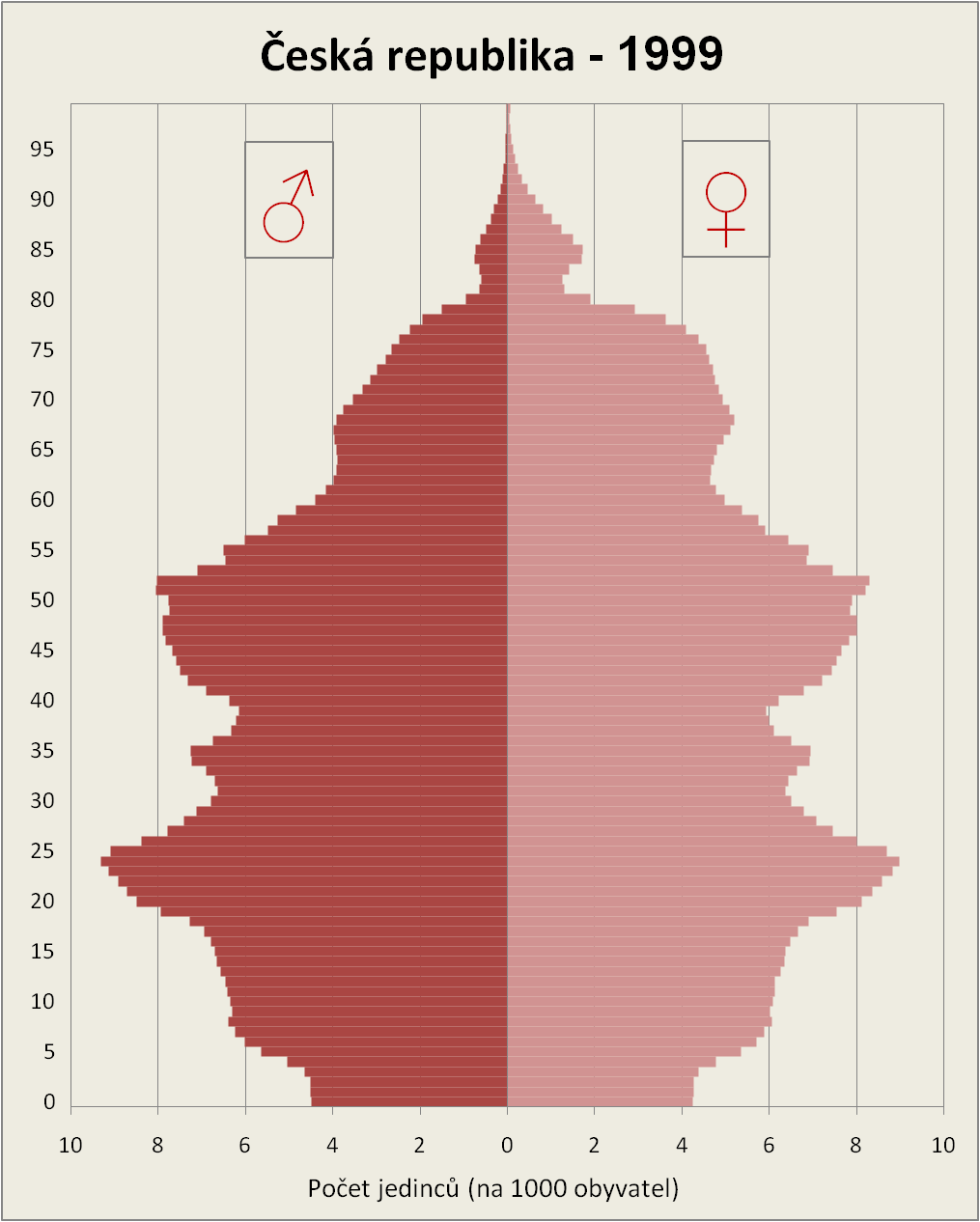
1999

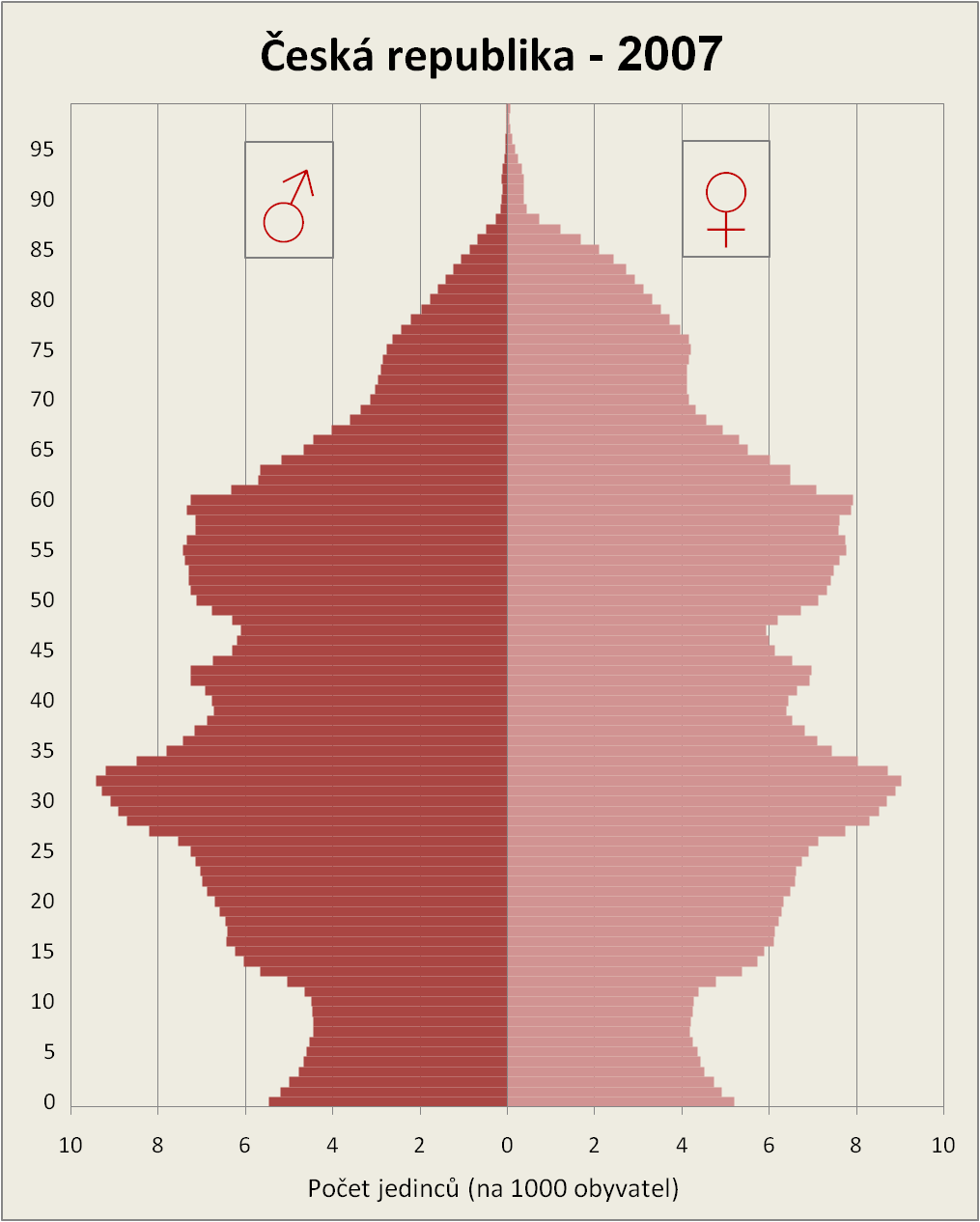
2007

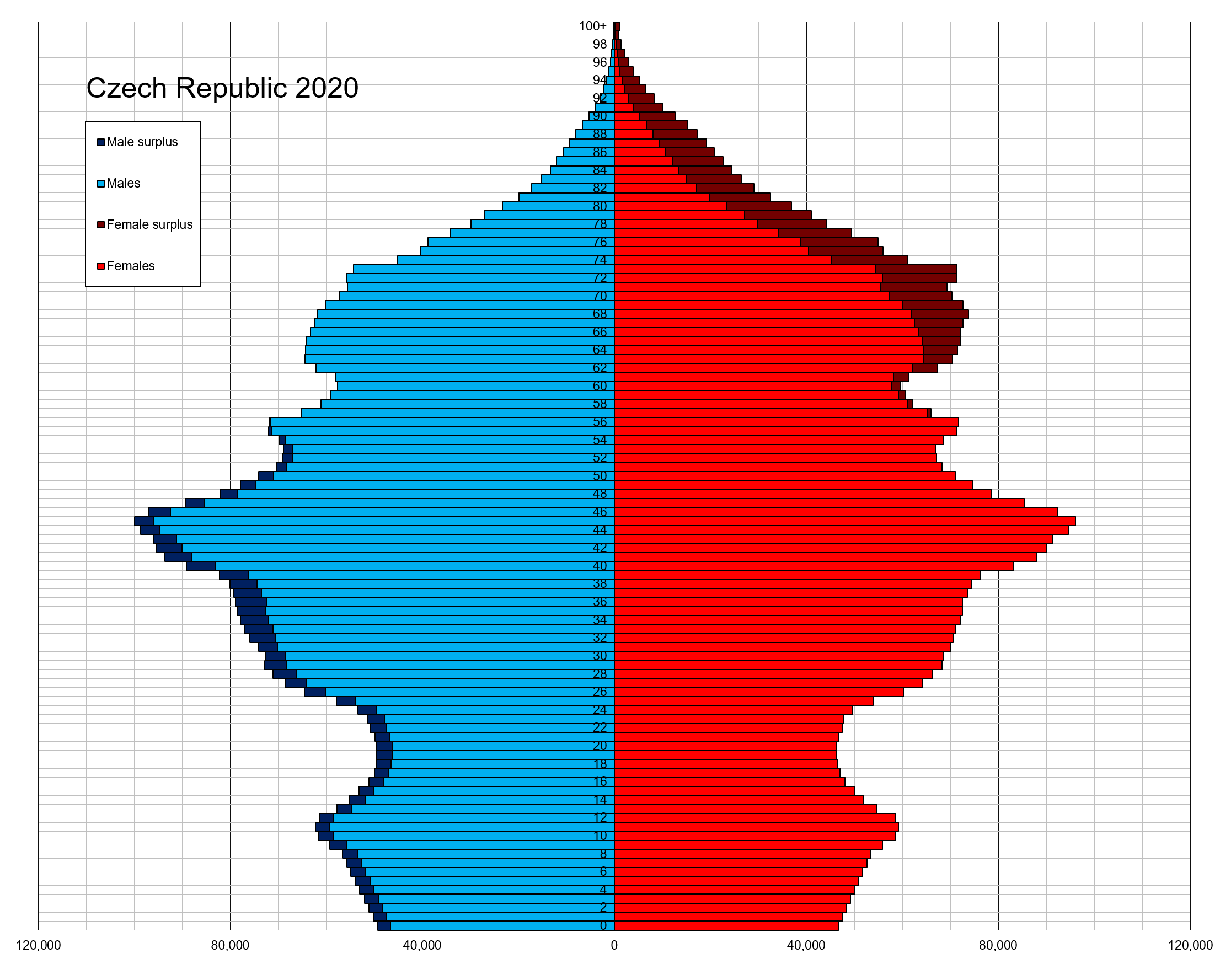
2020

== Projections ==
The following forecast for the future population is an official estimate of the Czech Statistical Office.

Year	Population	±%
2025	10,914,878	—
2030	10,748,352	–1.53%
2035	10,735,415	–0.12%
2040	10,714,384	–0.20%
2045	10,701,076	–0.12%
2050	10,691,467	–0.09%
2055	10,664,369	–0.25%
2060	10,593,389	–0.67%
2065	10,478,636	–1.08%
2070	10,346,296	–1.26%
2075	10,227,748	–1.15%
2080	10,141,649	–0.84%
2085	10,078,504	–0.62%
2090	10,025,224	–0.53%
2095	9,974,876	–0.50%
2100	9,911,339	–0.64%

== Vital statistics ==
Live births and deaths in the Czech Republic

Source: Czech Demographic Handbook, Czech Statistical Office – Data and time series

Notable events in Czech demographics:

- 1803–1815: Napoleonic Wars
- 1848: Revolution of 1848
- 1855: Cholera outbreak
- 1866: Austro-Prussian War
- 1914–1918: World War I
- 1929–1936: Great Depression
- 1939–1945: World War II
- 1970s–1980s: Baby boom in Czechoslovakia
- 2009–2013: Great Recession
- 2020–2022: COVID-19 pandemic
- 2022 onwards: Russian invasion of Ukraine

	Average population (Mid-year)	Live births	Deaths	Natural change	Crude birth rate (per 1000)	Crude death rate (per 1000)	Natural change (per 1000)	Crude migration rate (per 1000)	Total fertility rates	Female fertile population (15–49 years)	Migration change	Induced abortions
1785	4,250,000	183,354	153,103	30,251	43,1	36,0	7.1					
1786	4,318,000	194,629	131,812	62,817	45,1	30,5	14.6					
1787	4,392,000	202,181	128,078	74,103	46,0	29,2	16.8					
1788	4,418,000	165,481	117,556	47,925	44,9	31,9	13.0					
1789	4,414,000	185,368	131,377	53,991	42,0	29,8	12.2					
1790	4,444,000	198,291	152,550	45,741	44,6	34,3	10.3					
1791	4,497,000	187,199	160,651	26,548	41,6	35,7	5.9					
1792	4,531,000	201,080	141,238	59,842	44,4	31,2	13.2					
1793	4,553,000	196,648	141,309	55,339	43,2	31,0	12.2					
1794	4,570,000	201,433	151,513	49,920	44,1	32,2	10.9					
1795	4,588,000	198,425	164,732	33,693	43,2	35,9	7.3					
1796	4,598,000	199,548	146,225	53,323	43,4	31,8	11.6					
1797	4,633,000	194,932	145,659	49,273	42,1	31,4	10.7					
1798	4,668,000	204,272	139,238	65,034	43,8	29,8	14.0					
1799	4,670,000	200,307	160,609	39,698	42,9	34,4	8.5					
1800	4,659,000	196,011	177,730	18,281	42,1	38,1	4,0					
1801	4,692,000	196,838	170,187	26,651	42,0	36,3	5,7					
1802	4,767,000	207,716	157,243	50,473	43.6	33,0	10,6					
1803	4,823,000	205,868	162,632	43,236	42.7	33,7	9,0					
1804	4,894,000	211,425	150,742	60,683	43.2	30,8	12,4					
1805	4,941,000	202,708	163,136	39,572	41.0	33,0	8,0					
1806	4,833,000	170,277	282,321	-112,044	34.9	57.8	-22.9					
1807	4,857,000	220,530	172,000	48,530	45.4	35.4	10.0					
1808	4,876,000	221,952	165,140	56,812	45.5	33.9	11.6					
1809	4,853,000	211,573	185,671	25,902	43.6	38.3	5.3					
1810	4,870,000	198,407	218,034	-19,627	40.7	44.8	-4.1					
1811	4,916,000	229,131	174,015	55,116	46.6	35.4	11.2					
1812	4,951,000	215,954	173,716	42,238	43.6	35.1	8.5					
1813	4,859,000	212,067	151,341	60,726	43.6	31.1	12.5					
1814	4,826,000	204,555	200,379	4,176	42.4	41.5	0.9					
1815	4,810,000	209,886	146,800	63,086	43.6	30.5	13.1					
1816	4,878,000	209,473	143,940	65,533	42.9	29.5	13.4					
1817	4,961,000	208,345	160,703	47,642	42.0	32.4	9.6					
1818	5,021,000	204,175	152,665	51,510	40.7	30.4	10.3					
1819	5,093,000	238,968	163,932	75,036	46.9	32.2	14.7					
1820	5,272,791	232,287	137,938	94,349	44.1	26.2	17.9					
1821	5,353,785	231,028	139,127	91,091	43.2	26.0	17.2					
1822	5,426,885	218,983	149,842	69,141	40.4	27.6	12.7					
1823	5,494,633	229,571	161,716	67,885	41.8	29.4	12.3					
1824	5,567,415	228,372	153,232	75,140	41.0	27.5	13.5					
1825	5,641,433	239,187	152,791	86,396	42.4	27.1	15.3					
1826	5,715,138	236,735	154,862	81,873	41.4	27.1	14.3					
1827	5,831,825	229,186	164,697	64,489	39.3	28.2	11.1					
1828	5,933,743	224,584	188,501	36,083	37.8	31.8	6.0					
1829	5,959,643	220,607	181,782	38,825	37.0	30.5	6.5					
1830	5,996,788	235,046	167,326	67,720	39.2	27.9	11.3				-246	
1831	6,071,798	230,322	174,149	56,173	37.9	28.7	9.3				-299	
1832	6,117,669	232,138	231,240	898	37.9	37.8	0.1				-197	
1833	6,114,791	224,207	187,363	56,844	39.9	30.6	9.3				-182	
1834	6,139,975	242,356	184,887	57,469	39.5	30.1	9.4				-317	
1835	6,191,643	238,340	187,879	50,461	38.5	30.3	8.1				-203	
1836	6,200,250	230,823	211,406	19,417	37.2	34.1	3.1				-223	
1837	6,197,244	237,784	208,411	29,373	38.4	33.6	4.7				-231	
1838	6,248,539	241,510	163,343	78,167	38.7	26.1	12.5				-276	
1839	6,341,283	239,582	180,699	58,883	37.9	28.6	9.3				-203	
1840	6,378,071	248,179	175,901	72,278	38.9	27.6	11.3				-127	
1841	6,459,128	250,260	173,872	76,388	38.7	26.9	11.8					
1842	6,531,908	268,029	183,288	84,741	41.0	28.1	13.0					
1843	6,578,355	249,634	211,438	38,196	37.9	32.1	5.8					
1844	6,630,222	248,919	172,808	76,111	37.5	26.1	11.5					
1845	6,682,437	265,314	191,347	73,967	39.7	28.6	11.1					
1846	6,723,727	255,109	181,408	73,701	37.9	27.0	10.9				-160	
1847	6,768,064	245,283	215,836	29,447	36.2	31.9	4.4					
1848	6,778,356	222,052	238,747	-16,965	32.8	35.2	-2.5					
1849	6,789,915	273,846	209,097	64,749	40.3	30.8	9.5				-160	
1850	6,826,465	279,375	238,192	41,183	40.9	34.9	6.0				-174	
1851	6,870,370	282,747	197,429	85,318	41.2	28.7	12.4				-238	
1852	6,925,780	274,194	198,999	75,195	39.6	28.7	10.9				-387	
1853	6,976,739	267,965	195,270	72,695	38.4	28.0	10.4				-3,783	
1854	7,029,810	271,258	189,970	81,288	38.6	27.0	11.6				-6,421	
1855	7,044,048	222,109	249,679	-27,570	31.5	35.4	-3.9					
1856	7,045,616	256,308	211,615	44,693	36.4	30.0	6.4					
1857	7,091,652	286,089	197,287	88,782	40.3	27.8	12.5					
1858	7,151,837	284,645	198,957	85,688	39.8	27.8	12.0					
1859	7,214,655	287,152	190,741	96,411	39.8	26.4	13.4					
1860	7,277,801	270,285	183,829	86,456	37.1	25.3	11.9					
1861	7,328,855	267,729	206,381	61,348	36.5	28.2	8.4					
1862	7,373,633	273,947	205,608	68,339	37.2	27.9	9.3					
1863	7,429,933	299,164	204,273	94,891	40.3	27.5	12.8					
1864	7,483,274	290,417	230,321	60,096	38.8	30.8	8.0					
1865	7,528,107	289,047	219,001	70,046	38.4	29.1	9.3					
1866	7,532,419	295,548	336,685	-41,137	39.2	44.7	-5.5					
1867	7,533,238	271,228	211,279	59,949	36.0	28.0	8.0					
1868	7,584,956	292,139	208,858	83,281	38.5	27.5	11.0					
1869	7,643,553	292,240	212,678	79,562	38.2	27.8	10.4					
1870	7,698,830	303,318	209,604	93,714	39.4	27.2	12.2					
1871	7,714,152	303,186	213,133	90,053	39.1	27.5	11.6					
1872	7,809,472	307,621	240,620	67,001	39.4	30.8	8.6					
1873	7,864,793	317,639	262,416	55,223	40.4	33.4	7.0					
1874	7,920,115	317,287	222,392	94,895	40.1	28.1	12.0					
1875	7,975,435	310,492	207,303	103,189	38.9	26.0	12.9					
1876	8,030,757	316,063	217,404	98,659	39.4	27.1	12.3					
1877	8,086,077	305,741	253,207	52,534	37.8	31.3	6.5					
1878	8,141,398	307,300	250,197	57,103	37.7	30.7	7.0					
1879	8,196,719	314,478	228,060	86,418	38.4	27.8	10.5					
1880	8,252,040	306,044	229,462	76,982	37.1	27.8	9.3					
1881	8,301,997	304,793	245,424	59,369	36.7	29.6	7.2					
1882	8,346,588	319,687	238,866	80,821	38.3	28.6	9.7					
1883	8,391,180	314,393	242,901	71,492	37.5	28.9	8.5					
1884	8,435,770	324,257	247,799	76,458	38.4	29.4	9.0					
1885	8,480,362	318,788	249,061	69,727	37.6	29.4	8.2					
1886	8,524,953	319,223	251,382	67,841	37.4	29.5	8.0					
1887	8,569,544	315,869	238,119	77,750	36.9	27.8	9.1					
1888	8,614,135	315,728	252,483	63,245	36.7	29.3	7.4					
1889	8,658,727	315,811	232,156	83,655	36.5	26.8	9.7					
1890	8,703,318	307,225	254,987	52,238	35.3	29.3	6.0					
1891	8,761,173	322,057	235,832	86,225	36.8	26.9	9.8					
1892	8,832,295	309,263	245,741	63,522	35.0	27.8	7.2					
1893	8,903,416	323,817	243,360	80,457	36.4	27.3	9.1					
1894	8,974,537	319,499	242,136	77,363	35.6	27.0	8.6					
1895	9,045,659	329,786	232,691	97,095	36.5	25.7	10.8					
1896	9,116,780	330,862	224,476	106,386	36.3	24.6	11.7					
1897	9,187,901	327,343	229,050	98,293	35.6	24.9	10.7					
1898	9,259,022	326,519	224,659	101,860	35.3	24.3	11.0					
1899	9,330,143	329,747	236,614	93,133	35.3	25.4	9.9					
1900	9,333,853	330,662	227,920	102,742	35.3	24.4	11.0	-10.8	4.85			
1901	9,404,689	325,514	221,052	104,462	34.6	23.5	11.1	-3.8	4.76			
1902	9,474,876	333,619	222,457	111,162	35.2	23.5	11.7	-4.6	4.68			
1903	9,545,134	318,275	218,448	99,827	33.3	22.9	10.4	-3.3	4.6			
1904	9,615,027	319,433	222,276	97,157	33.2	23.1	10.1	-3.0	4.52			
1905	9,684,512	300,414	232,999	67,415	31.0	24.1	7.1	0.1	4.44			
1906	9,745,475	313,449	203,182	110,267	32.1	20.8	11.3	-5.3	4.36			
1907	9,824,544	306,356	210,721	95,635	31.2	21.4	9.8	-1.8	4.27			
1908	9,894,520	308,504	210,101	98,403	31.2	21.2	10.1	-3.1	4.19			
1909	9,964,789	305,426	210,047	95,379	30.6	21.1	9.5	-2.7	4.11			
1910	10,035,575	295,617	196,728	98,889	29.5	19.6	9.9	-3.0	4.03			
1911	10,099,152	289,058	206,266	82,792	28.6	20.4	8.2	-2.1	3.92			
1912	10,157,344	280,368	203,324	77,044	27.6	20.0	7.6	-2.0	3.82			
1913	10,221,343	275,060	190,475	84,585	26.9	18.6	8.3	-2.1	3.71			
1914	10,283,486	269,142	188,388	80,304	26.2	18.4	7.8	-1.3	3.6			
1915	10,285,882	197,542	201,280	-3,378	19.2	19.6	-0.4	0.7	3.5			
1916	10,221,815	140,211	186,381	-46,170	13.7	18.2	-4.5	-1.7	3.39			
1917	10,128,304	126,916	188,649	-61,733	12.5	18.6	-6.1	-3.0	3.28			
1918	9,987,000	120,579	236,035	-115,456	12.1	23.6	-11.5	-11.1	3.18			
1919	9,921,710	189,675	177,428	12,247	19.1	17.9	1.2	-9.5	3.07			
1920	9,978,420	244,668	176,562	68,106	24.5	17.7	6.8	-1.1	2.964	2,787,978		
1921	10,002,030	257,281	161,321	95,960	25.7	16.1	9.6	-7.3	3.035	2,810,061		
1922	10,112,730	248,728	163,366	85,362	24.6	16.2	8.4	2.5	2.882	2,852,697	-14,842	
1923	10,198,370	241,230	142,335	98,895	23.7	14.0	9.7	-1.3	2.768	2,884,554	-10,930	
1924	10,277,770	228,894	146,098	82,796	22.3	14.2	8.1	-0.3	2.590	2,914,672	-7,856	
1925	10,369,760	225,555	146,450	79,105	21.8	14.1	7.6	1.3	2.484	2,950,835	-8,720	
1926	10,442,610	219,802	148,298	71,504	21.0	14.2	6.8	0.1	2.392	2,980,498	-6,488	
1927	10,495,940	208,711	155,479	53,232	19.9	14.8	5.1	0.0	2.237	3,007,055	-5,501	
1928	10,549,221	208,942	147,064	61,878	19.8	13.9	5.9	-0.8	2.209	3,032,177	-6,634	
1929	10,597,761	203,064	155,493	47,571	19.2	14.7	4.5	0.1	2.124	3,051,531	-5,440	
1930	10,648,057	207,224	142,159	65,065	19.5	13.4	6.1	-1.4	2.149	3,057,394	-4,948	
1931	10,702,208	196,214	144,534	51,680	18.3	13.5	4.8	0.2	2.026	3,043,805	-3,105	
1932	10,750,003	190,397	142,997	47,400	17.7	13.3	4.4	0.0	1.966	3,017,535	-1,246	
1933	10,791,313	176,201	140,906	35,295	16.3	13.1	3.3	0.6	1.826	2,987,230	-211	
1934	10,826,082	171,042	135,914	35,128	15.8	12.6	3.2	0.0	1.774	2,971,471	-1,069	
1935	10,853,125	161,748	140,878	20,870	14.9	13.0	1.9	06	1.678	2,979,846	-1,044	
1936	10,872,519	157,992	139,093	18,899	14.5	12.8	1.7	0.0	1.664	3,001,262	-1,538	
1937	10,888,540	155,996	139,558	16,438	14.3	12.8	1.5	0.0	1.690	3,024,902	-2,997	
1938	10,877,442	163,525	143,115	20,410	15.0	13.2	1.9	-2.9	1.847			
1939	11,105,990	192,344	146,976	45,368	17.3	13.2	4.1	16.8	1.916			
1940	11,159,539	218,043	153,499	64,544	19.5	13.8	5.8	-1.0	2.195			
1941	11,129,373	208,913	152,048	56,865	18.8	13.7	5.1	-7.8	2.279			
1942	11,054,018	199,259	153,096	46,163	18.0	13.8	4.2	-10.9	2.422			
1943	11,034,846	225,379	153,349	72,030	20.4	13.9	6.5	-8.3	2.784			
1944	11,109,341	230,183	161,457	68,726	20.7	14.5	6.2	0.5	2.796			
1945	10,692,912	194,182	184,944	9,238	18.2	17.3	0.9	-45.8	2.673	2,160,614		
1946	9,523,266	210,454	134,568	75,886	22.1	14.1	8.0	-116.5	3.254	2,213,164		
1947	8,765,230	206,745	105,277	101,468	23.6	12.0	11.6	-90.3	3.050	2,414,191	49,731	
1948	8,893,104	197,837	101,501	96,336	22.2	11.4	10.8	3.6	2.886	2,410,762	720	
1949	8,892,613	185,484	104,632	80,852	20.9	11.8	9.1	-9.1	2.728	2,364,198	3,202	
1950	8,925,122	188,341	103,203	85,138	21.1	11.6	9.5	-5.9	2.801	2,327,181	16,784	
1951	9,023,170	185,570	102,658	82,912	20.6	11.4	9.2	1.7	2.763	2,310,547	12,910	
1952	9,125,183	180,143	97,726	82,417	19.9	10.8	9.0	2.2	2.701	2,292,960	21,022	
1953	9,220,908	172,547	98,837	73,710	18.9	10.8	8.0	2.4	2.611	2,276,097	11,325	
1954	9,290,617	168,402	99,636	68,766	18.3	10.8	7.4	0.1	2.581	2,258,979	-2,376	
1955	9,365,969	165,874	93,300	72,574	17.9	10.1	7.7	0.3	2.578	2,249,231	3,437	
1956	9,442,040	162,509	93,526	68,983	17.4	10.0	7.3	0.8	2.568	2,242,227	6,176	
1957	9,513,758	155,429	98,687	56,742	16.6	10.5	6.0	1.6	2.495	2,235,891	6,832	
1958	9,574,650	141,762	93,697	48,065	15.0	9.9	5.0	1.3	2.305	2,235,143	6,118	49,035
1959	9,618,554	128,982	97,159	31,823	13.6	10.3	3.3	1.3	2.121	2,236,848	8,054	61,914
1960	9,659,818	128,879	93,863	35,016	13.6	9.9	3.6	0.6	2.113	2,238,414	6,521	67,550
1961	9,588,016	131,019	94,973	36,046	13.7	9.9	3.8	-11.2	2.133	2,233,224	4,911	70,062
1962	9,621,808	133,557	104,318	29,239	13.9	10.8	3.0	0.5	2.140	2,250,320	5,823	66,031
1963	9,668,741	148,840	100,129	48,711	15.4	10.4	5.0	-0.2	2.332	2,267,933	8,277	51,470
1964	9,730,019	154,420	101,984	52,436	15.9	10.5	5.4	0.9	2.356	2,283,352	4,814	51,525
1965	9,785,102	147,438	105,108	42,330	15.1	10.7	4.3	1.3	2.178	2,307,598	3,528	58,554
1966	9,826,188	141,162	105,784	35,378	14.4	10.8	3.6	0.6	2.01	2,348,038	2,127	65,818
1967	9,854,241	138,448	108,967	29,481	14.1	11.1	3.0	-0.1	1.90	2,394,485	-3,267	69,850
1968	9,877,632	137,437	115,195	22,242	13.9	11.7	2.3	0.1	1.83	2,441,326	-1,562	72,488
1969	9,896,695	143,165	120,653	22,512	14.5	12.2	2.3	-0.3	1.86	2,474,842	-2,724	74,263
1970	9,805,157	147,865	123,327	24,538	15.1	12.6	2.5	-11.7	1.91	2,459,252	-4,350	71,893
1971	9,830,602	154,180	122,375	31,805	15.7	12.5	3.2	-0.6	1.98	2,458,469	2,490	68,652
1972	9,868,379	163,661	119,205	44,456	16.6	12.1	4.5	-0.7	2.07	2,457,952	2,884	65,079
1973	9,919,519	181,750	124,437	57,313	18.3	12.5	5.8	-0.6	2.29	2,452,906	4,615	55,898
1974	9,994,761	194,215	126,809	67,406	19.4	12.7	6.7	0.8	2.43	2,446,024	3,052	56,969
1975	10,062,366	191,776	124,314	67,462	19.1	12.4	6.7	0.0	2.40	2,435,921	2,401	55,511
1976	10,128,220	187,378	125,232	62,146	18.5	12.4	6.1	0.4	2.36	2,428,019	2,630	56,889
1977	10,189,312	181,763	126,214	55,549	17.8	12.4	5.5	0.5	2.32	2,423,656	1,307	61,114
1978	10,245,686	178,901	127,136	51,765	17.5	12.4	5.1	0.5	2.32	2,424,580	2,064	63,904
1979	10,296,489	172,112	127,949	44,163	16.7	12.4	4.3	0.6	2.29	2,430,946	2,494	64,505
1980	10,326,792	153,801	135,537	18,264	15.0	13.2	1.8	1.2	2.10	2,435,437	1,856	68,930
1981	10,303,208	144,438	130,407	14,031	14.0	12.7	1.4	-3.6	2.02	2,429,295	1,717	71,574
1982	10,314,321	141,738	130,765	10,973	13.7	12.7	1.1	0.0	2.01	2,431,178	1,748	74,574
1983	10,322,823	137,431	134,474	2,957	13.3	13.0	0.3	0.5	1.96	2,436,205	2,383	75,037
1984	10,330,481	136,941	132,188	4,753	13.3	12.8	0.5	0.3	1.97	2,445,979	2,621	79,534
1985	10,336,742	135,881	131,641	4,240	13.1	12.7	0.4	0.6	1.96	2,459,586	2,195	83,042
1986	10,340,737	133,356	132,585	771	12.9	12.8	0.1	0.3	1.94	2,477,791	3,013	83,564
1987	10,348,834	130,921	127,244	3,677	12.7	12.3	0.4	0.4	1.91	2,501,531	2,721	109,626
1988	10,356,359	132,667	125,694	6,973	12.8	12.1	0.7	0.1	1.94	2,529,458	2,544	113,730
1989	10,362,257	128,356	127,747	609	12.4	12.3	0.1	0.5	1.87	2,562,592	1,459	111,683
1990	10,362,740	130,564	129,166	1,398	12.6	12.5	0.1	-0.1	1.89	2,594,107	624	111,268
1991	10,308,682	129,354	124,290	5,064	12.5	12.1	0.5	-5.7	1.86	2,605,248	2,876	106,042
1992	10,317,807	121,705	120,337	1,368	11.8	11.7	0.1	0.8	1.71	2,629,303	11,781	94,180
1993	10,330,607	121,025	118,185	2,840	11.7	11.4	0.3	1.2	1.67	2,647,784	5,476	70,634
1994	10,336,162	106,579	117,373	-10,794	10.3	11.4	-1.0	1.6	1.44	2,659,357	9,942	54,836
1995	10,330,759	96,097	117,913	-21,816	9.3	11.4	-2.1	1.6	1.28	2,666,201	9,999	49,531
1996	10,315,353	90,446	112,782	-22,336	8.8	10.9	-2.2	0.7	1.19	2,658,882	10,129	48,086
1997	10,303,642	90,657	112,744	-22,087	8.8	10.9	-2.1	1.0	1.17	2,642,181	12,075	45,022
1998	10,294,943	90,535	109,527	-18,992	8.8	10.6	-1.8	1.0	1.16	2,625,594	9,488	42,959
1999	10,282,784	89,471	109,768	-20,297	8.7	10.7	-2.0	0.8	1.13	2,609,889	8,774	39,382
2000	10,272,503	90,910	109,001	-18,091	8.8	10.6	-1.8	0.8	1.14	2,595,195	6,539	34,623
2001	10,224,192	90,715	107,755	-17,040	8.9	10.5	-1.7	-4.5	1.14	2,568,283	-8,551	32,528
2002	10,200,774	92,786	108,243	-15,457	9.1	10.6	-1.5	-0.8	1.17	2,548,024	12,290	31,142
2003	10,201,651	93,685	111,288	-17,603	9.2	10.9	-1.7	1.8	1.18	2,534,915	25,789	29,298
2004	10,206,923	97,664	107,177	-9,513	9.6	10.5	-0.9	1.4	1.23	2,525,684	18,635	27,574
2005	10,234,092	102,211	107,938	-5,727	10.0	10.5	-0.6	3.2	1.28	2,519,440	36,229	26,453
2006	10,266,646	105,831	104,441	1,390	10.3	10.2	0.1	3.2	1.33	2,516,411	34,720	25,352
2007	10,322,689	114,632	104,636	9,996	11.1	10.1	1.0	4.5	1.44	2,519,711	83,945	25,414
2008	10,429,692	119,570	104,948	14,622	11.5	10.1	1.4	8.9	1.50	2,535,688	71,790	25,760
2009	10,491,492	118,348	107,421	10,927	11.3	10.2	1.0	4.9	1.49	2,541,780	28,344	24,636
2010	10,517,247	117,153	106,844	10,309	11.2	10.2	1.0	1.5	1.49	2,537,262	15,648	23,998
2011	10,496,672	108,673	106,848	1,825	10.4	10.2	0.2	-2.1	1.43	2,501,062	16,889	24,055
2012	10,509,286	108,576	108,189	387	10.3	10.3	0.0	1.2	1.45	2,484,727	10,293	23,032
2013	10,510,719	106,751	109,160	-2,409	10.2	10.4	-0.2	0.4	1.46	2,461,864	-1,297	22,714
2014	10,524,783	109,860	105,665	4,195	10.4	10.0	0.4	0.9	1.53	2,437,301	21,661	21,893
2015	10,542,942	110,764	111,173	-409	10.5	10.5	-0.0	1.8	1.57	2,414,152	15,977	20,403
2016	10,565,284	112,663	107,750	4,913	10.7	10.2	0.5	1.7	1.63	2,395,539	20,063	20,406
2017	10,589,526	114,405	111,443	2,962	10.8	10.5	0.3	2.0	1.69	2,379,747	28,273	19,415
2018	10,626,430	114,036	112,920	1,116	10.7	10.6	0.1	3.4	1.71	2,369,520	38,629	18,298
2019	10,669,324	112,231	112,362	-131	10.5	10.5	-0.0	4.0	1.71	2,361,163	44,270	17,751
2020	10,700,155	110,200	129,289	-19,089	10.3	12.1	-1.8	4.7	1.71	2,352,621	26,927	16,886
2021	10,500,850	111,793	139,891	-28,098	10.6	13.3	-2.6	-16.0	1.83	2,269,150	49,969	15,492
2022	10,759,525	101,299	120,219	-18,920	9.5	11.4	-1.8	26.4	1.64	2,345,977	329,742	16,438
2023	10,878,042	91,149	112,795	-21,646	8.4	10.4	-2.0	13.0	1.45	2,379,983	94,672	15,088
2024	10,886,531	84,311	112,211	-27,900	7.7	10.3	-2.6	3.3	1.37	2,359,085	36,845	
2025	10,891,162	77,636	113,337	-35,701	7.1	10.4	-3.3	3.7	1.28		42,040	
2026	10,903,655	73,000(e)	113,000(e)	-40,000(e)	6.7(e)	10.4(e)	-3.7(e)		1.22(e)			

(e) – estimated data

=== Nationality of mothers and fathers ===
Births by country of birth of the mother (2024)
Country	Births
Czech Republic	72,619
Europe (excluding the Czech Republic) detail:
Ukraine	5,324
Slovakia	2,637
Russia	500
Moldova	184
Poland	153
Belarus	90
Romania	84
Germany	79
Bulgaria	69
Serbia	60
Armenia	41
America detail:
United States	68
Asia detail:
Vietnam	902
Mongolia	191
Kazakhstan	137
India	79
China	78
Philippines	68
Uzbekistan	61
Other	887
Foreign	11,692
National total	84,311

Births by country of birth of the father (2024)
Country	Births
Czech Republic	67,324
Europe (excluding the Czech Republic) detail:
Ukraine	4,197
Slovakia	2,588
Russia	290
Moldova	202
Germany	195
Romania	139
France	117
United Kingdom	116
Poland	107
Italy	103
Bulgaria	80
Spain	74
Serbia	69
America detail:
United States	111
Asia detail:
Vietnam	826
Mongolia	177
India	107
Kazakhstan	99
Turkey	86
Other/undeclared	7,304
Foreign	16,987
National total	84,311

=== Current vital statistics ===
Period	Live births	Deaths	Natural increase
January–June 2025	38,225	57,938	–19,713
January–June 2026	36,466	57,564	–21,098
Difference	▼ –1,759 (–4.6%)	▼ –374 (–0.64%)	▼ –1,385

- Deaths January–September 2025 = ▲83,646
- Deaths January–September 2026 = ▼83,284

=== Vital statistics by region ===
Region	Population	Live births	Deaths	Natural change	Crude birth rate (per 1000)	Crude death rate (per 1000)	Natural change (per 1000)	Total fertility rates	Migration change
Prague	1,398,674	10,946	12,128	-1,182	7.8	8.7	-0.9	1.15	10,386
Central Bohemian	1,469,457	10,201	13,718	-3,517	6.9	9.3	-2.4	1.27	14,436
South Bohemian	652,249	4,645	7,094	-2,449	7.1	10.9	-3.8	1.35	2,118
Plzeň	611,537	4,239	6,592	-2,353	6.9	10.8	-3.9	1.26	2,396
Karlovy Vary	291,942	1,798	3,399	-1,601	6.2	11.6	-5.4	1.16	433
Ústí nad Labem	806,231	5,443	9,407	-3,964	6.8	11.7	-4.9	1.26	1,551
Liberec	448,050	3,055	4,756	-1,701	6.8	10.6	-3.8	1.27	817
Hradec Králové	554,161	3,855	6,029	-2,174	7.0	10.9	-3.9	1.33	919
Pardubice	529,871	3,809	5,491	-1,682	7.2	10.4	-3.2	1.33	2,163
Vysočina	515,719	3,896	5,440	-1,544	7.6	10.6	-3.0	1.42	-150
South Moravian	1,227,149	8,912	12,474	-3,562	7.3	10.2	-2.9	1.27	4,735
Olomouc	630,218	4,576	6,922	-2,346	7.3	11.0	-3.7	1.37	2,326
Zlín	577,656	4,091	6,235	-2,144	7.1	10.8	-3.7	1.36	661
Moravian-Silesian	1,178,248	8,170	13,652	-5,482	6.9	11.6	-4.7	1.30	-751
Note: data shown in the table are for 2025.

=== Total fertility rate by district ===
2024
Districts	TFR
Benešov District	1.46
Beroun District	1.28
Kladno District	1.32
Kolín District	1.42
Kutná Hora District	1.38
Mělník District	1.34
Mladá Boleslav District	1.26
Nymburk District	1.56
Prague-East District	1.38
Prague-West District	1.36
Příbram District	1.45
Rakovník District	1.39
České Budějovice District	1.49
Český Krumlov District	1.42
Jindřichův Hradec District	1.43
Písek District	1.40
Prachatice District	1.43
Strakonice District	1.49
Tábor District	1.42
Domažlice District	1.39
Klatovy District	1.36
Plzeň-City District	1.29
Plzeň-South District	1.47
Plzeň-North District	1.44
Rokycany District	1.23
Tachov District	1.19
Cheb District	1.08
Karlovy Vary District	1.13
Sokolov District	1.27
Děčín District	1.38
Chomutov District	1.43
Litoměřice District	1.43
Louny District	1.40
Most District	1.46
Teplice District	1.39
Ústí nad Labem District	1.41
Česká Lípa District	1.36
Jablonec nad Nisou District	1.36
Liberec District	1.30
Semily District	1.38
Hradec Králové District	1.42
Jičín District	1.43
Náchod District	1.37
Rychnov nad Kněžnou District	1.47
Trutnov District	1.38
Chrudim District	1.43
Pardubice District	1.40
Svitavy District	1.56
Ústí nad Orlicí District	1.45
Havlíčkův Brod District	1.49
Jihlava District	1.43
Pelhřimov District	1.45
Třebíč District	1.55
Žďár nad Sázavou District	1.57
Blansko District	1.50
Brno-City District	1.36
Brno-Country District	1.41
Břeclav District	1.30
Hodonín District	1.43
Vyškov District	1.50
Znojmo District	1.49
Jeseník District	1.41
Olomouc District	1.45
Prostějov District	1.47
Přerov District	1.45
Šumperk District	1.51
Kroměříž District	1.56
Uherské Hradiště District	1.45
Vsetín District	1.39
Zlín District	1.45
Bruntál District	1.26
Frýdek-Místek District	1.34
Karviná District	1.33
Nový Jičín District	1.39
Opava District	1.47
Ostrava-City District	1.33
Czech Republic	1.37

=== Structure of the population ===
Population Estimates by Sex and Age Group (01.I.2011):

Age group	Male	Female	Total	%
Total	5 168 799	5 363 971	10 532 770	100
0–4	296 944	282 591	579 535	5.50
5–9	249 218	235 846	485 064	4.61
10–14	233 025	220 518	453 543	4.31
15–19	298 949	283 701	582 650	5.53
20–24	355 493	336 516	692 009	6.57
25–29	386 426	360 070	746 496	7.09
30–34	461 410	434 976	896 386	8.51
35–39	456 642	432 290	888 932	8.44
40–44	361 605	343 287	704 892	6.69
45–49	354 342	342 339	696 681	6.61
50–54	336 194	336 351	672 545	6.39
55–59	367 638	386 703	754 341	7.16
60–64	352 692	391 178	743 870	7.06
65–69	249 700	302 420	552 120	5.24
70–74	163 508	220 319	383 827	3.64
75–79	122 317	191 050	313 367	2.98
80–84	79 882	152 084	231 966	2.20
85–89	34 877	86 898	121 775	1.16
90–94	6 453	19 431	25 884	0.25
95–99	1 277	4 727	6 004	0.06
100+	207	676	883	<0.01
Age group	Male	Female	Total	Percent
0–14	779 187	738 955	1 518 142	14.41
15–64	3 731 391	3 647 411	7 378 802	70.06
65+	658 221	977 605	1 635 826	15.53

Population Estimates by Sex and Age Group (01.I.2021):

Age group	Male	Female	Total	%
Total	5 275 103	5 426 674	10 701 777	100
0–4	290 444	276 818	567 262	5.30
5–9	285 498	271 459	556 957	5.20
10–14	304 995	290 527	595 522	5.56
15–19	252 007	238 443	490 450	4.58
20–24	245 786	232 124	477 910	4.47
25–29	320 181	300 744	620 925	5.80
30–34	370 523	348 408	718 931	6.72
35–39	389 652	363 658	753 310	7.04
40–44	460 462	432 859	893 321	8.35
45–49	452 969	429 617	882 586	8.25
50–54	352 166	338 917	691 083	6.46
55–59	336 205	333 528	669 733	6.26
60–64	304 764	320 701	625 465	5.84
65-69	313 014	359 404	672 418	6.28
70-74	274 177	347 000	621 177	5.80
75-79	170 104	247 097	417 201	3.90
80-84	90 188	153 949	244 137	2.28
85-89	44 759	93 731	138 490	1.29
90-94	14 784	39 027	53 811	0.50
95-99	2 177	8 066	10 243	0.10
100-104	221	530	751	0.01
105-109	27	67	94	<0.01
Age group	Male	Female	Total	Percent
0–14	880 937	838 804	1 719 741	16.07
15–64	3 484 715	3 338 999	6 823 714	63.76
65+	909 451	1 248 871	2 158 322	20.17

== Education ==
=== Literacy ===
definition: NA

total population: 99%
male: 99%
female: 99% (2011 est.)

== Employment and income ==
=== Unemployment, youth ages 15–24 ===
Total: 8%. Country comparison to the world: 155th
Male: 7.2%
Female: 9.2% (2020 est.)

== Ethnic groups ==
The majority of the 10.5 million inhabitants of the Czech Republic are ethnically and linguistically Czech (95%). They are descendants of Slavic people from the Black Sea-Carpathian region who settled in Bohemia, Moravia and parts of present-day Austria in the 6th century AD. Other ethnic groups include Germans, Romani people, Poles, and Hungarians. Historical minorities like Germans and Poles are declining due to assimilation. There is also a growing community from Vietnam. Other ethnic communities like Greeks, Turks, Italians, and Yugoslavs are found in Prague. Since the dissolution of Czechoslovakia, Slovaks living in the Czech Republic have comprised roughly 3% of the population.

There are different groups of national and ethnic minorities in the Czech Republic. The only "old minority" is Poles in the Trans-Olza region, while the "new minorities" are scattered among the majority population (generally in the larger towns). While some of the minorities have the whole social structure of Czech society (Poles, Slovaks, Greeks and Ukrainians), other represent only some of the social groups (i.e. Russian newcomers of middle class, and Romani people who generally represent the underclass).

=== 1880–1910 ===
Population of Bohemia, Moravia and Austrian Silesia by language
Language	1880	1890	1900	1910
Czech	62.5%	62.4%	62.4%	62.9%
German	35.8%	35.6%	35.1%	34.6%
Polish	1.0%	1.2%	1.6%	1.6%
Other	0.7%	0.8%	0.9%	0.9%
Total population	8,222,013	8,665,421	9,372,140	10,078,637

=== After World War I ===
Population of the Czech Republic according to ethnic group 1921–2021
Ethnic group	census 1921 ^{1}		census 1930		census 1950		census 1961		census 1970		census 1980		census 1991		census 2001		census 2011		census 2021	
Ethnic group	Number	%	Number	%	Number	%	Number	%	Number	%	Number	%	Number	%	Number	%	Number	%	Number	%
Czechs	6,758,983	67.5	7,304,588	68.3	8,343,558	93.9	9,023,501	94.2	9,270,617	94.4	9,733,925	94.6	8,363,768	81.2	9,249,777	90.5	6,732,104	63.7	6,415,104	61.0
Moravians	6,758,983	67.5	7,304,588	68.3	8,343,558	93.9	9,023,501	94.2	9,270,617	94.4	9,733,925	94.6	1,362,313	13.2	380,474	3.7	522,474	4.9	556,641	5.3
Silesians	6,758,983	67.5	7,304,588	68.3	8,343,558	93.9	9,023,501	94.2	9,270,617	94.4	9,733,925	94.6	44,446	0.4	10,878	0.1	12,231	0.1	31,301	0.3
Slovaks	15,732	0.2	44,451	0.4	258,025	2.9	275,997	2.9	320,998	3.3	359,370	3.5	314,877	3.1	193,190	1.9	149,140	1.4	162,578	1.5
Poles	103,521	1.0	92,689	0.9	70,816	0.8	66,540	0.7	64,074	0.7	66,123	0.6	59,383	0.6	51,968	0.5	39,269	0.4	38,218	0.4
Germans	3,061,369	30.6	3,149,820	29.5	159,938	1.8	134,143	1.4	80,903	0.8	58,211	0.6	48,556	0.5	39,106	0.4	18,772	0.3	24,632	0.2
Ukrainians	13,343	0.1	22,657	0.2	19,384	0.2	19,549	0.2	9,794	0.1	10,271	0.1	8,220	0.1	22,112	0.2	53,603	0.5	92,892	0.9
Rusyns	13,343	0.1	22,657	0.2	19,384	0.2	19,549	0.2	9,794	0.1	10,271	0.1	1,926	0.0	1,106	0.0	739	0.0	1,904	0.0
Russians	13,343	0.1	22,657	0.2	19,384	0.2	19,549	0.2	6,619	0.1	5,051	0.0	5,062	0.0	12,369	0.1	18,021	0.2	34,506	0.3
Vietnamese													421	0.0	17,462	0.2	29,825	0.3	38,723	0.4
Hungarians	7,049	0.1	11,427	0.1	13,201	0.1	15,152	0.2	18,472	0.2	19,676	0.2	19,932	0.2	14,672	0.1	9,049	0.1	11,253	0.1
Romani people			227	0.0	19,770	0.2	19,392	0.2					32,903	0.3	11,746	0.1	5,199	0.0	21,691	0.2
Jews	35,699	0.4	37,093	0.4									218	0.0			521	0.0	2,349	0,0
Yugoslavs			4,749	0.0			3,957	0.0							3,386	0.0				
Romanians			966	0.0			3,205	0.0					1,034	0.0	1,238	0.0	1,921	0.0	5,969	0,0
Others/undeclared	10,038	0.1	5,719	0.1	11,441	0.1	10,095	0.1	36,220	0.4	39,300	0.4	39,129	0.4	220,660	2.6	2,739,488^{1}	26.0		
Total	10,005,734		10,674,386		8,896,133		9,571,531		9,807,697		10,291,927		10,302,215		10,230,060		10,436,560		10,524,167	
^{1} On the territory of the census date.

^{1} In 2011 a large part of the population did not claim any ethnicity, before the census it was widely mediatized that the question is not mandatory. The vast majority of those who did so are presumed to be ethnic Czechs, number of whom dropped by roughly the same amount that the number of undeclared people rose, circa 2.5 million.

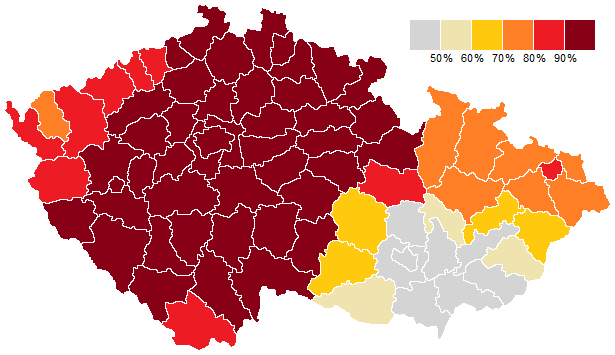
Czechs in 1991

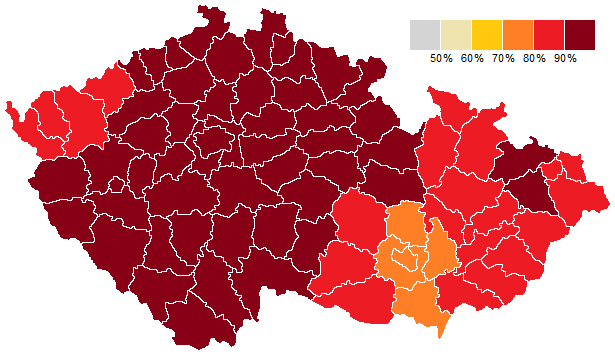
Czechs in 2001

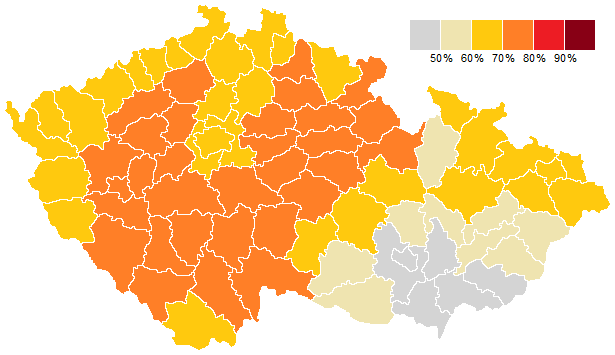
Czechs in 2011

The legal position of the minorities is defined foremost in the Act No. 273/2001 Coll. (The Rights of the Minorities Act) which implements the Charter of Fundamental Rights and Basic Freedoms, Framework Convention for the Protection of National Minorities and Recommendation of the Council of Europe No. 1201. There is a number of other enactments which to lesser extent deal with the minorities.

A special situation applies in the case of Moravians and Silesians, who are frequently allocated within the group of Czechs when it comes to the statistical data.

=== Officially recognised minorities ===
Minorities, which "traditionally and on a long term basis live within the territory of the Czech Republic" enjoy some privileges. As of 2022 there are 14 such officially recognised minorities, which are (alphabetically): Belarusians, Bulgarians, Croatians, Germans, Greeks, Hungarians, Poles, Romani people, Russians, Rusyns, Serbs, Slovaks, Ukrainians and Vietnamese.

Citizens belonging to the officially recognised minorities enjoy the right to "use their language in communication with authorities and in courts of law". Article 25 of the Czech Charter of Fundamental Rights and Basic Freedoms provides the right of the national and ethnic minorities to education and communication with authorities in their own language. Act No. 500/2004 Coll. (The Administrative Rule) in its paragraph 16 (4) (Procedural Language) provides that a citizen of the Czech Republic who belongs to a national or an ethnic minority, which traditionally and on a long-term basis lives within the territory of the Czech Republic, has the right to address an administrative agency and proceed before it in the language of the minority. In the case that the administrative agency does not have an employee with knowledge of the language, the agency is bound to obtain a translator at the agency's own expense. According to Act No. 273/2001 (About The Rights of Members of Minorities) paragraph 9 (The right to use language of a national minority in dealing with authorities and in the courts of law) the same also applies to members of national minorities in the courts of law.

Bulgarians

The economic migration of Bulgarians to the Czech Republic began in the 1990s. 4,363 citizens claimed to have Bulgarian nationality in the 2001 census. They mostly live in the large cities and towns, such as Prague, Brno, Ostrava, Karlovy Vary, Kladno, Ústí nad Labem, Děčín, and Havířov. Nowadays the newcomers from Bulgaria aim for these areas in particular, where they can join an already established community. Many of these economic immigrants have dual citizenship of both the Czech Republic and Bulgaria. However most of the recent immigrants still only have Bulgarian citizenship.

The Bulgarian Cultural Organisation publishes the magazine Roden Glas, while a folklore organisation Kytka promotes traditional Bulgarian dances. Among other organisations are Pirin, Zaedno, Vazraždane and Hyshove.

As an officially recognised minority the Bulgarian citizens of the Czech Republic enjoy the right to use their language in communication with authorities and in the courts of law. They also enjoy a number of other rights connected to the status of recognised minority, e.g. the right to education in their own language: the first Bulgarian school in the current Czech Republic was established in 1946 in Prague.

Germans

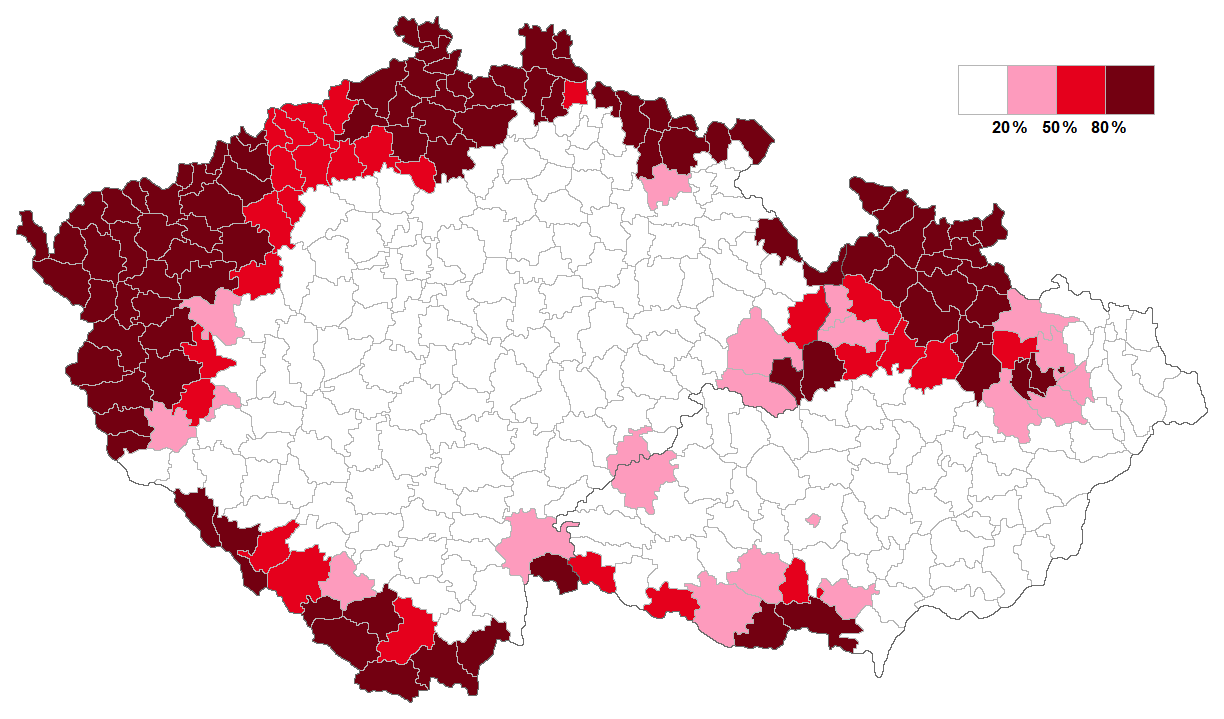
Czech districts with 50% or more ethnic German population in 1935

The German minority of the Czech Republic, historically the largest minority of the country, was almost entirely removed when 3 million were forcibly expelled in 1945–46 on the basis of the Potsdam Agreement. The constitution guarantees rights for minority languages, however there are 13 municipalities with German minority constituting 10% of population, which qualifies for such provisions. There is no bilingual education system in Western and Northern Bohemia, where the German minority is mostly concentrated. However, this is in large part due to the absence of German-speaking youth, a heritage of the post-war policy of the Communist government.

According to the 2001 census there remain 13 municipalities and settlements in the Czech Republic with more than 10% Germans.

Many representatives of expellees' organizations support the erection of bilingual signs in all formerly German-speaking territory as a visible sign of the bilingual linguistic and cultural heritage of the region, but their efforts are not supported by some of the current inhabitants, as the vast majority of the current population is not of German descent.

The German-Czech Declaration of 21 January 1997 covered the two most critical issues—the role of some Sudeten Germans in the breakup of Czechoslovakia in 1938 and their expulsion after World War II.

Greeks

Another influential minority are Greeks. Large numbers of Greeks arrived in Czechoslovakia during the end of the Greek Civil War. The first transports of Greek children arrived in 1948 and 1949. Later, more transports, also including adults, arrived. They were partly leftists, communists and guerillas with their relatives, hence the willingness of Czechoslovak government to allow the immigration. This was viewed rather as a temporary solution. After the defeat of DSE and other left-wing guerillas, the Greeks stayed in Czechoslovakia. In total more than 12,000 Greeks immigrated to Czechoslovakia between 1948 and 1950. Today, there are about 7000 Greeks in the country (3219 according to 2001 census data), mostly in the 3 biggest towns – Prague, Brno, Ostrava – and also in Bohumín, Havířov, Jeseník, Karviná, Krnov, Šumperk, Třinec, Vrbno pod Pradědem and Žamberk (apart from the last one these towns are in Silesia).

Poles

The most concentrated linguistic minority in the Czech Republic are ethnic Poles, historically the plurality, today constituting about 10% of the population of Karviná and Frýdek-Místek districts. Poles have the right to use their language in official dealings; the public media (Czech TV and Czech Radio) regularly broadcast in Polish; and there are many Polish primary and secondary schools in the area. The Polish minority has been decreasing substantially since World War II as education in Polish was difficult to obtain, while Czech authorities did not permit bilingual signs to maintain Polish awareness among the population.

The erection of bilingual signs has technically been permitted since 2001, if a minority constitutes 10% of the population of a municipality. The requirement that a petition be signed by the members of minority was cancelled, thus simplifying the whole process. Still, only a couple of villages with large Polish minorities have bilingual signs (Vendryně/Wędrynia for instance).

Romanis

Another minority is the Roma, who nonetheless have very little influence on Czech policy. Around 90% of the Roma that lived in the Czech Republic prior to World War II were exterminated by the Nazi Porajmos. The Roma there now are 80% post-war immigrants from Slovakia or Hungary, or the descendants thereof. In total, the Roma in the CR now number around 200,000. There is Romani press in the CR, written in both Czech and Romani, but Romani radio is broadcast in Czech and there is no Romani television. Romani is also absent from legislative, judiciary, and other political texts but it has recently entered some university and elementary school courses. Life expectancy, literacy, median wage, school enrolment, and other socio-economic markers remain low while Roma compose the majority of prison and habitual offender populations despite accounting for only a fraction of a percent of Czech population.

== Immigration ==
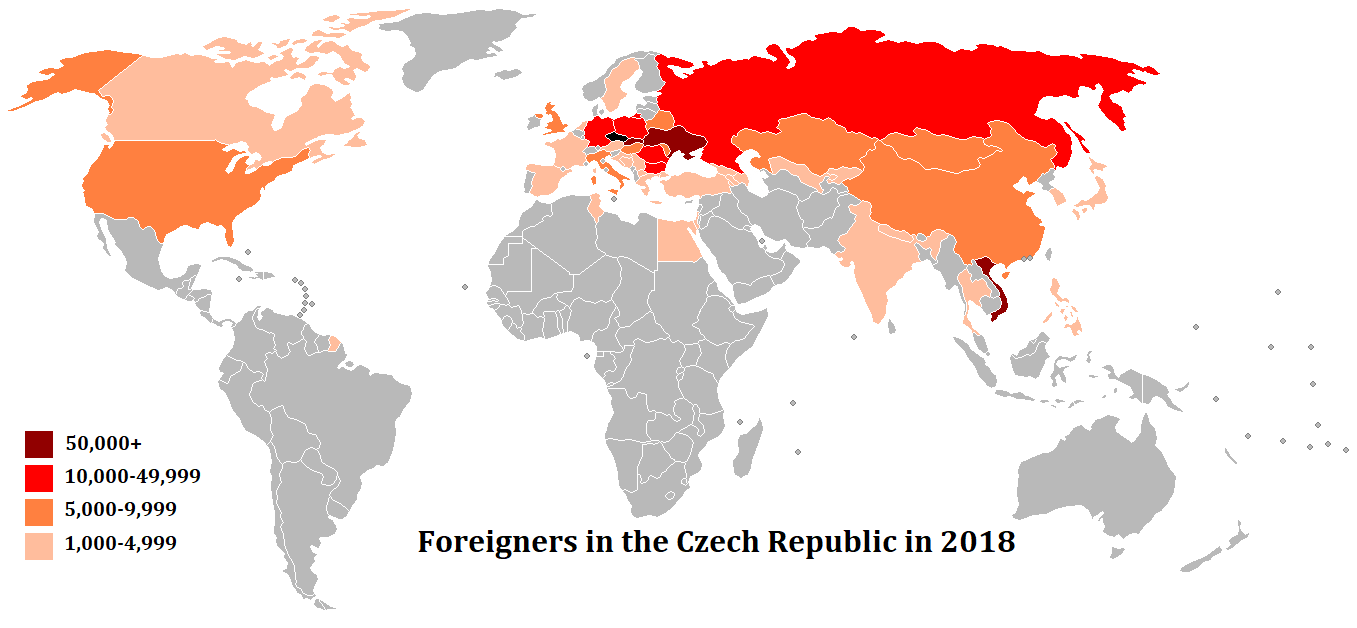
Foreign population in the Czech Republic in 2018

According to the Czech Statistical Office as of 31 December 2020 there were 632,570 legal foreign residents in the Czech Republic (5.1% of the total population). Residents from Ukraine are the largest group (165,356), followed by residents of Slovakia (124,544). There are also Asian immigrant communities in the Czech Republic. The largest is the Vietnamese one (62,842) followed by the Mongolians (10,135) and the Chinese (7,940). During the communist era the governments of Czechoslovakia and Vietnam had a deal concerning the education of Vietnamese people in Czechoslovakia. Vietnamese people came to Czechoslovakia for the first time in 1956 and then the number of new migrants grew until the fall of communism. First generation Vietnamese work mostly as small-scale businessmen in markets. Still, many Vietnamese are without Czech citizenship. One of the towns with the largest Vietnamese communities is Cheb. Other large immigrant groups come from Russia (41,692), Poland (20,733), Germany (20,861), Bulgaria (17,917) and Romania (18,396).

=== Czech Republic Net migration data ===
Year	Net Migration
2002	12,290
2003	25,789
2004	18,635
2005	36,229
2006	34,720
2007	83,945
2008	86,412
2009	28,344
2010	15,648
2011	16,889
2012	10,293
2013	-1,297
2014	21,661
2015	15,977
2016	20,064
2017	28,273

Migration statistics for the Czech Republic (2017–2024)
Year	Immigrants	Emigrants	Net migration
2017	45,957	17,684	28,273
2018	58,148	19,519	38,629
2019	65,571	21,301	44,270
2020	55,661	28,734	26,927
2021	69,201	19,232	49,969
2022	349,548	19,806	329,742
2023	141,263	46,591	94,672
2024	121,823	84,978	36,845
2025	110,600	68,560	42,040

=== Recent trends ===
Countries with at least 1,000 people, immigrating each year.
Country	2016	2017	2018
Ukraine	5,778	10,340	16,747
Slovakia	6,706	6,328	6,671
Russia	2,404	2,891	3,388
Vietnam	1,752	2,196	2,264
Romania	1,648	1,829	2,184
Bulgaria	1,331	1,620	1,977
Mongolia	709	1,165	1,498
Hungary	911	1,238	1,330
Belarus	421	657	1,145
China	551	823	1,123
United States	1,063	1,073	1,101
Serbia	230	414	1,041
Total	37,503	45,957	58,148

=== Foreign-born population ===
Top 50 largest groups of foreign residents
Rank	Nationality	Population		Change
Rank	Nationality	31 December 2025	31 October 2026	Change
	Total	1,131,197	1,153,486	▲22,289
1	Ukraine	612,953	620,717	▲7,764
2	(European Union) Slovakia	125,280	128,211	▲2,931
3	Vietnam	69,685	70,158	▲473
4	Russia	37,524	37,120	▼ -404
5	(European Union) Romania	21,287	21,204	▼ -83
6	Philippines	14,530	20,016	▲5,486
7	(European Union) Poland	17,631	17,529	▼ -102
8	(European Union) Bulgaria	17,562	17,060	▼ -502
9	Mongolia	14,908	15,371	▲463
10	India	11,545	12,724	▲1,179
11	(European Union) Hungary	12,111	12,461	▲350
12	United States	11,133	10,996	▼ -137
13	(European Union) Germany	11,061	10,682	▼ -379
14	Kazakhstan	10,435	10,665	▲230
15	China	10,326	10,467	▲141
16	Moldova	8,391	8,616	▲225
17	United Kingdom	7,889	7,964	▲75
18	Turkey	6,333	7,138	▲805
19	Belarus	7,157	6,968	▼ -189
20	(European Union) Italy	6,486	6,592	▲106
21	Serbia	5,821	5,767	▼ -54
22	(European Union) France	4,207	4,277	▲70
23	Uzbekistan	4,083	4,118	▲35
24	South Korea	3,135	3,363	▲228
25	(European Union) Croatia	3,243	3,262	▲19
26	Armenia	2,710	2,835	▲125
27	North Macedonia	2,794	2,831	▲37
28	Azerbaijan	2,546	2,794	▲248
29	Georgia	2,154	2,473	▲319
30	(European Union) Spain	2,310	2,444	▲134
31	Japan	2,291	2,361	▲70
32	(European Union) Netherlands	2,295	2,309	▲14
33	Thailand	1,933	2,205	▲72
34	Bosnia and Herzegovina	2,233	2,194	▼ -39
35	(European Union) Austria	2,175	2,149	▼ -26
36	(European Union) Greece	2,041	2,056	▲15
37	Egypt	1,956	2,043	▲87
38	Israel	1,903	2,000	▲97
39	Nepal	1,618	1,716	▲98
40	Tunisia	1,648	1,712	▲64
41	Kosovo	1,647	1,665	▲18
42	Pakistan	1,397	1,637	▲240
43	Syria	1,611	1,636	▲25
44	Bangladesh	1,453	1,586	▲133
45	Kyrgyzstan	1,555	1,560	▲5
46	Mexico	1,461	1,536	▲75
47	Iran	1,487	1,516	▲29
48	Nigeria	1,413	1,503	▲90
49	Canada	1,415	1,490	▲75
50	Brazil	1,452	1,463	▲11

See also

- Armenians in the Czech Republic
- Chinese people in the Czech Republic
- Croats in the Czech Republic
- Germans in the Czech Republic
- Greeks in the Czech Republic
- History of the Jews in the Czech Republic
- Koreans in the Czech Republic
- Macedonians in the Czech Republic
- Mongolians in the Czech Republic
- Polish minority in the Czech Republic
- Portuguese in the Czech Republic
- Romani people in the Czech Republic
- Slovaks in the Czech Republic
- Turks in the Czech Republic
- Ukrainians in the Czech Republic
- Vietnamese people in the Czech Republic

== Languages ==
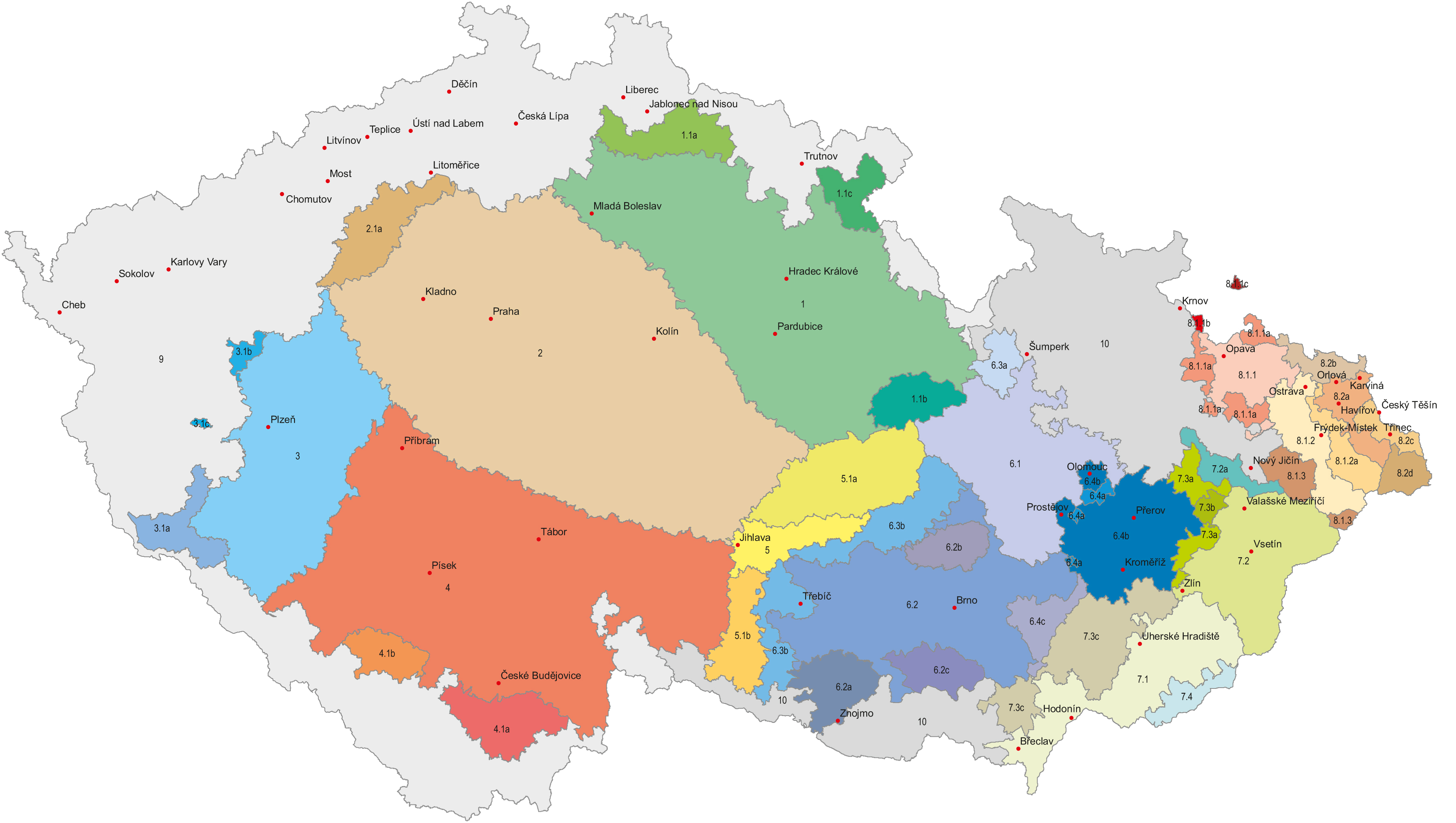
Dialects of Czech, Moravian, Lach, and Cieszyn Silesian spoken in the Czech Republic. The border areas, where German was formerly spoken, are now mixed.

The official language of the Czech Republic is Czech, which is used in government, legislation, education, and the judiciary. Czech is a West Slavic language and shares a very high mutual intelligibility with the Slovak language. Although the constitution does not specify an official language of the republic, Czech is spoken as sole mother tongue by 92% to 98% of the population depending on the survey, making the Czech Republic one of the most linguistically homogeneous countries in Europe. Common Czech has become the predominant spoken variety across much of the country.

The Czech language is divided into three dialects in Bohemia, four dialects in Moravia, and two dialects in Czech Silesia) is the official language of the state. There is also the transitional Cieszyn Silesian dialect as well as the Polish language in Cieszyn Silesia, both spoken in Czech Silesia. Various Sudeten German dialects are currently practically extinct: present Czech Germans speak mainly Czech and/or Standard German. Czech Sign Language is the language of most of the deaf community.

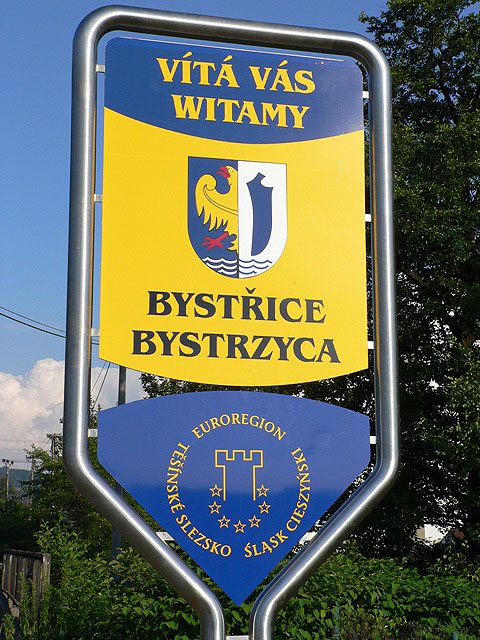
Bilingual Czech-Polish town sign in the Cieszyn Silesia Euroregion

The Czech Republic officially recognises a series of minorities who have legal status and may use their own language to conduct official business, which results in a series of minority languages that may be used officially by members of the recognised minority groups.

Among the foreign languages studied at Czech public schools, English saw a steep increase of popularity since the 1990s and is studied by over 98% of Czech students starting in the first, second, or third grade depending on the school. Moreover, the vast majority of Czech children study at least two foreign languages in school, with German being the principal second foreign language studied by about 50% of students, a value that has remained stable over the past decades. Russian, which used to be dominant and mostly compulsory at Czech schools before the fall of the Iron Curtain and the Velvet Revolution in 1989, has been significantly declining and is now studied by less than 20% of students as second foreign language, while French and Spanish have gradually increased in popularity to about 6-8% each. The major shift towards English resulted in 2024 Eurobarometer polls reporting 41% of Czechs feeling proficient in the language. Since 2005, German (12%) and Russian (6.5%) experienced moderate and drastic proficiency declines, respectively, caused by strongly proficient pre-Velvet Revolution generations disappearing and, in the case of Russian, a steeply decreasing interest and perceived usability.

== Religion ==
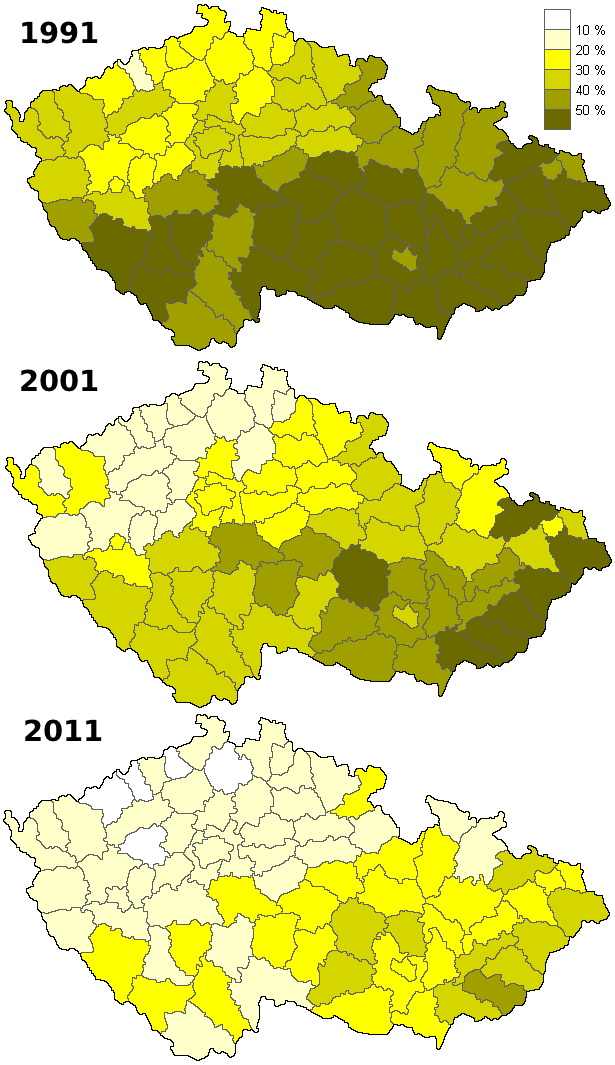
Religious structure in 1991, 2001 and 2011.

Religious affiliations in the Czech Republic, census 1991–2011
	1991		2001		2011		2021 p	
	number	%	number	%	number	%	number	%
Roman Catholic Church	4,021,385	39.0	2,740,780	26.8	1,082,463	10.4	741,019	7.0
Evangelical Church of Czech Brethren	203,996	2.0	117,212	1.1	51,858	0.5	32,577	0.3
Czechoslovak Hussite Church	178,036	1.7	99,103	1.0	39,229	0.4	23,610	0.2
Believers identified with another specific religion	120,317	1.7	330,993	3.2	290,034	2.8	577,079	5.5
Believers not identified with any specific religion					705,368	6.8	960,201	9.1
No religion	4,112,864	39.9	6,039,991	59.0	3,612,804	34.2	5,024,416	47.7
No response, unknown	1,665,617	16.2	901,981	8.8	4,774,323	45.2	3,167,774	30.1
Total population	10,302,215		10,230,060		10,436,560		10,524,167	

The 2021 census did not contain list of religious organisations and they had to be written by the respondent (unlike in the previous ones). Therefore another 231 thousand people responded with catholicism or similar response, 71 thousand people identified simply with Christianity and 27 thousand people claimed to be protestants or evangelicals. Moreover, after doubling their followers the Orthodox Church of the Czech Lands and Slovakia was the 2nd strongest church in 2021 census with 40,681 faithful.

Almost half (45.2%) of the Czech population prefer not to respond to religious questions in the Census. Others claim to have no religion or that they are without religious affiliation (34.2%). In comparison, one in every five claims to have some personal belief (20.6%).

The largest denominations are Roman Catholicism, estimated at 10.3% of the population, Protestant (0.5%), Hussites (0.4%). Other organised religions, including non-organised believers, totalled about (9.4%) (as of Census 2011).

According to the Eurobarometer Poll 2005, 19% of Czech citizens responded that "they believe there is a God", whereas 50% answered that "they believe there is some sort of spirit or life force" and 30% that "they do not believe there is any sort of spirit, god, or life force"; the percentage of believers is thus the lowest of EU countries after Estonia with 16%.
