= Czech Republic–Mongolia relations =

- Czech Republic: Mongolia

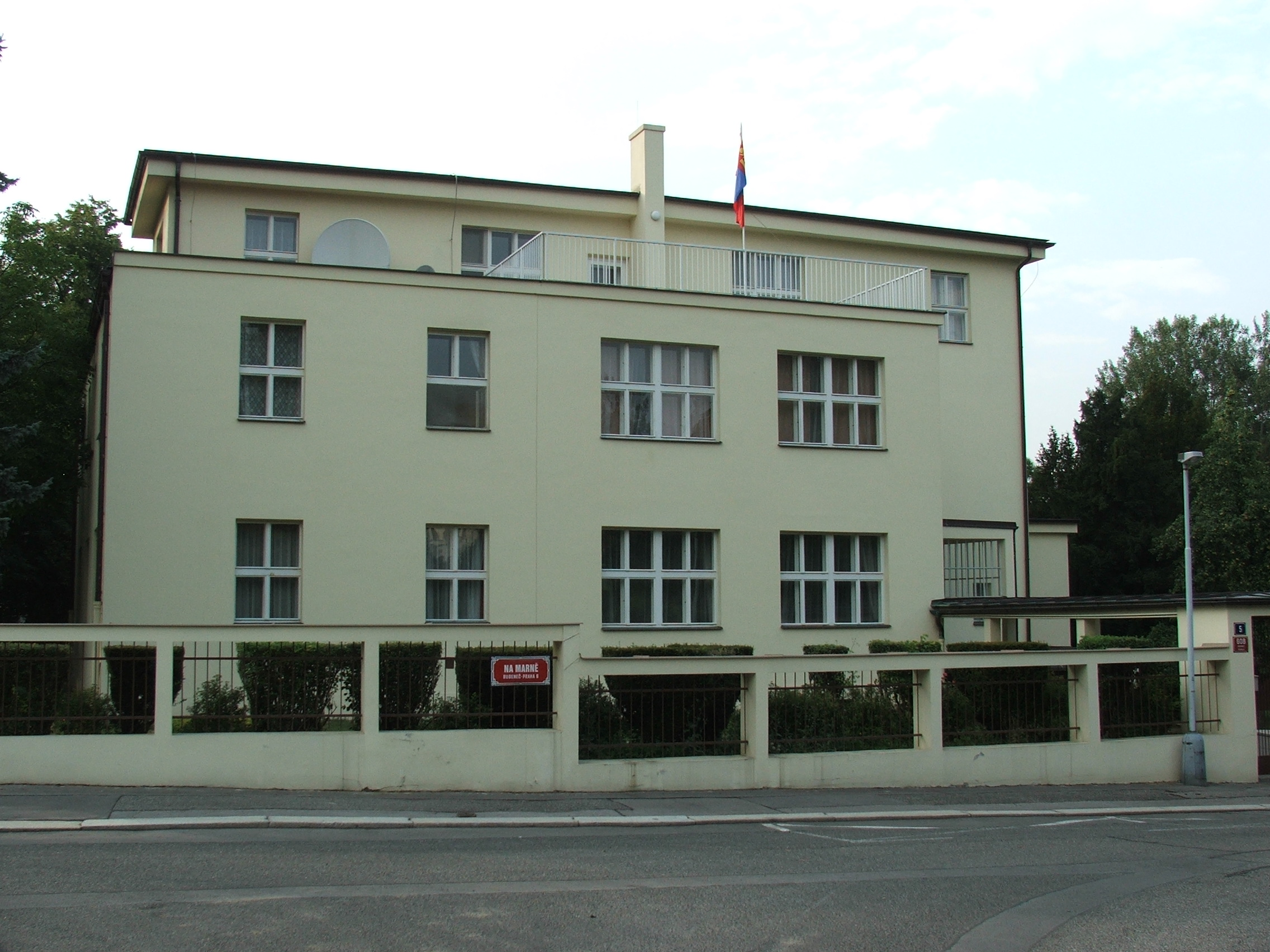
The Mongolian embassy in Prague, one of a modest number of Mongolian diplomatic missions in Europe

Czech Republic–Mongolia relations refer to the diplomatic relations between the Czech Republic and Mongolia. The Czech Republic has an embassy in Ulaanbaatar. Both nations are full members of the World Trade Organization and United Nations.

== History ==
=== Early history ===
The Moravians fought alongside Poland against the Mongols at the Battle of Legnica during the First Mongol invasion of Poland in 1241. After the Mongol victory, the Mongols invaded the Bohemian (Czech) Kingdom, but were ultimately repulsed.

=== Communist era ===
Diplomatic relations were established on 25 April 1950 between Czechoslovakia and the Mongolian People's Republic, both of which were communist states of the Eastern Bloc, and both were members of the Comecon. In 1953, the first Czechoslovak ambassador was sent to Mongolia. In the 1980s, Czechoslovakia was Mongolia's second-largest trading partner, behind the USSR. After the 1992 dissolution of Czechoslovakia, Mongolia reaffirmed its relations with the newly formed Czech Republic in 1993.

=== Post-1993 ===
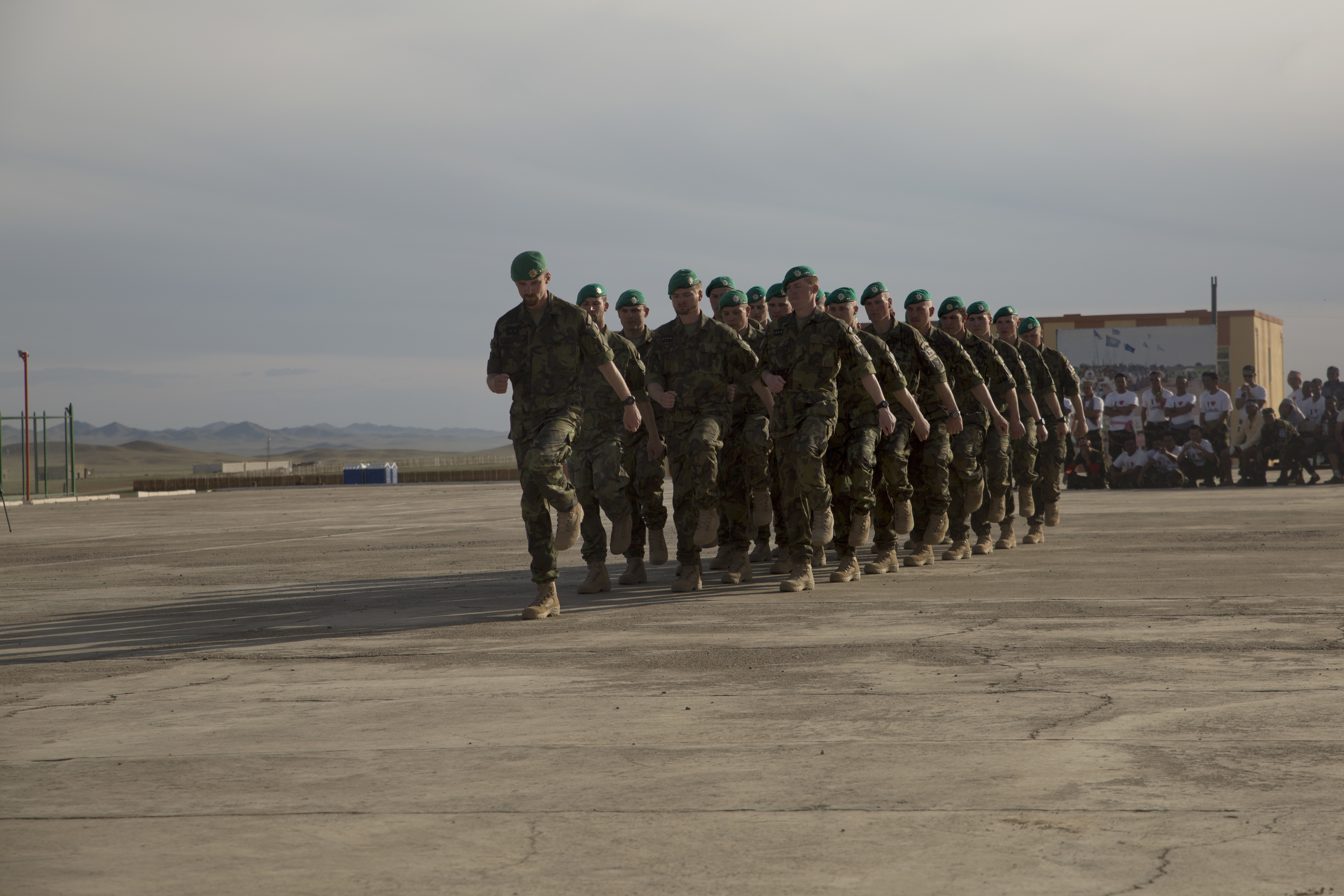
Czech soldiers at the Khaan Quest annual military exercise in Mongolia in 2016

In the 1990s, trade volumes declined sharply, though the Czech Republic still accounts for about 1% of Mongolia's imports. The Czech embassy in Ulaanbaatar was inherited by the Czech Republic, which closed in 1994 due to financial difficulties and became dependent on Beijing. The Consular and Visa Section of the Czech Embassy in Beijing was located in Ulaanbaatar. The Embassy of the Czech Republic in Ulaanbaatar was formally reopened in May 1999 during Czech Foreign Minister Jan Kavan's visit to Mongolia. It has been operating as a charge d'affaires since July 2004.

== High level intergovernmental visits ==
=== From Mongolia to the Czech Republic ===
- President Natsagiin Bagabandi (1999)

=== From the Czech Republic to Mongolia ===
- President Václav Klaus (2006)

== Economic relations ==
As of 2005, annual bilateral trade between the two countries was valued at US$5 million. The Czech government has also been involved in various water supply development programs in Mongolia. In 2002, the Czech Ministry of Industry and Trade developed plans to provide drinking water to Dundgovi Aimag through the development of a new water treatment plant at Mandalgovi. Then, in September 2007, the Czech Chamber of Commerce for East Asia signed a memorandum of cooperation agreeing to design and build new sewage processing plants for Ulaanbaatar. In terms of joint scientific expeditions looking for dinosaur fossils in Mongolia, the Mongolian side has also recently shown preference to Czech paleontologists over those from the United States, Germany, and Switzerland. Mongolian and Czech officials note a number of commonalities between the two countries which serve to cement their ties, such as their transitions to market-based economies and democratisation of previously communist-dominated governments. In 2012, the Czech Ministry of Industry and Trade announced a new partnership to the value of around four billion Czech koruna involving the supply of infrastructure to Mongolia.

== See also ==
- Foreign relations of the Czech Republic
- Foreign relations of Mongolia
- Mongolians in the Czech Republic
