= Portuguese in the Czech Republic =

Czech Portuguese
Luso-checos (Portuguese) Portugalci v České republice (Czech)
- (Czech Republic) (Portugal)

Total population
- 2,202

Languages
- Czech, Portuguese

Religion
- Predominantly Christianity (Roman Catholicism), irreligion

Related ethnic groups
- Other Portuguese people, Portuguese in Slovakia

Portuguese in the Czech Republic (Czech: Portugalci v České republice) are citizens and residents of the Czech Republic who are of Portuguese descent.

Portuguese in the Czech Republic (also known as Portuguese Czechs/ Czech-Portuguese Community or, in Portuguese, known as Portugueses na República Checa/ Comunidade portuguesa na República Checa/ Luso-checos) are the citizens or residents of the Czech Republic whose ethnic origins lie in Portugal.

Portuguese Czechs are Portuguese-born citizens with Czech citizenship or Czech-born citizens of Portuguese ancestry or citizenship.

According to official Portuguese estimates, there were 2,202 Portuguese people residing in the Czech Republic in 2022. Only 1 Portuguese citizen has acquired Czech citizenship since 2008. The Portuguese constitute approximately 0.02% of the country's population.

== History ==
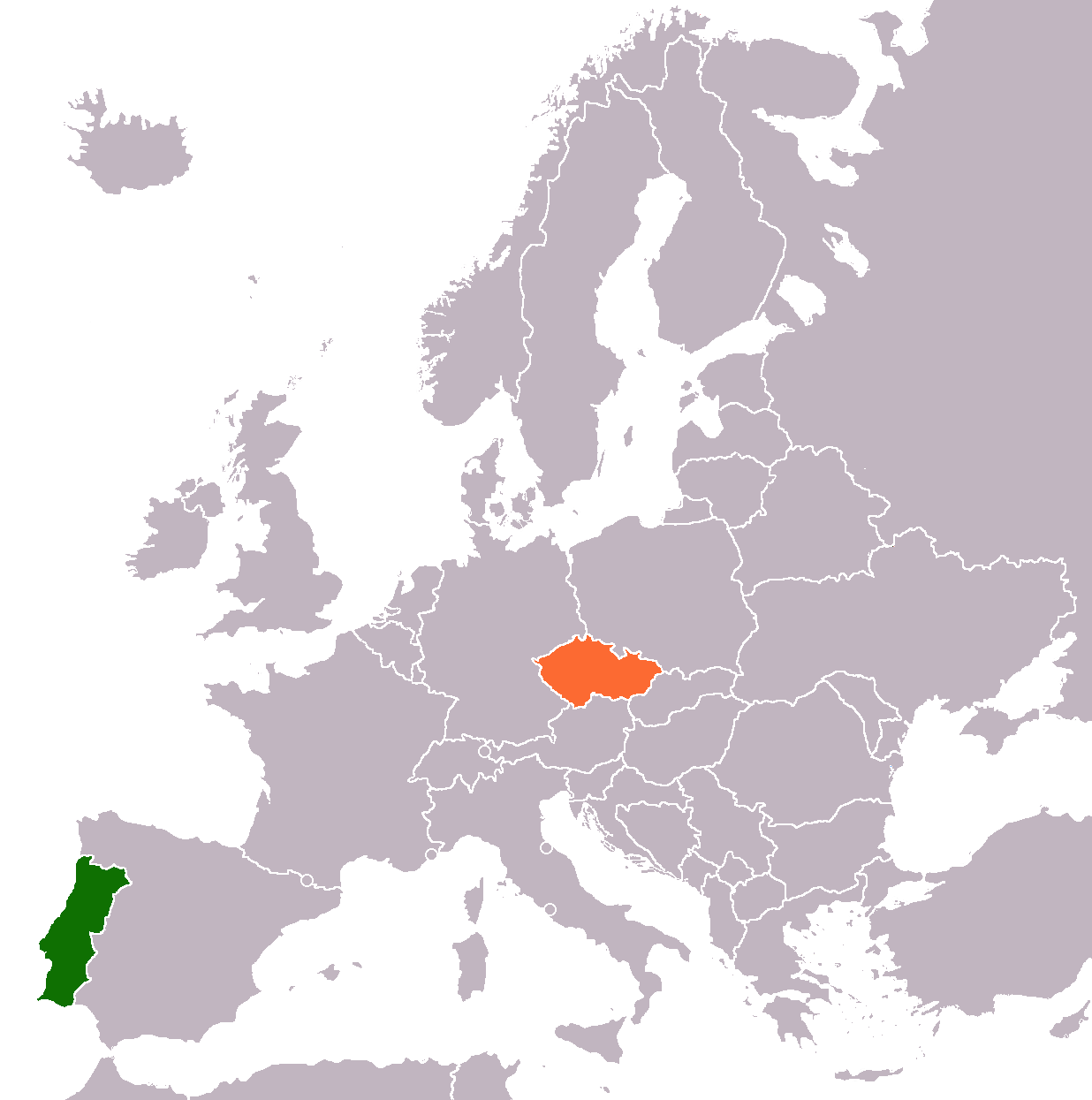
Map showing the location of the two countries within Europe

The history of the Portuguese community in the Czech Republic is very recent. Both countries are EU as well as NATO members. Dealing with having a common currency, Czechs are quite reluctant towards adopting the euro, even though the Czech Republic might become part of the Eurozone by 2030.

The Portuguese community in the Czech Republic is relatively small compared to other immigrant communities in the country, such as Ukrainians or Vietnamese. Many Portuguese individuals moved to the Czech Republic for work or study opportunities, particularly in fields like tourism, language education, and business.

The Czech Republic is quite popular among Erasmus+ students as well: in 2021 alone around 900 Portuguese nationals chose to study or carry out research in the Czech Republic under the Erasmus+ agreement (Higher education, Adult education, youth mobility, staff mobility).

The Portuguese community in the Czech Republic has grown steadily – at least since the COVID-19 pandemic – over the years (around 1,150 Portuguese have entered the country since 2008) but it still represents a relatively small percentage of the total foreign population in the country. The Portuguese community in the country has shrunk after the outbreak of the COVID-19 pandemic (in 2020 there were more than 2,500 Portuguese living in the country) probably because many Portuguese work in multinational companies that have switched/introduced remote work.

== Footballers ==
In recent years some Portuguese international footballers have moved to the Czech Republic to play for Czech clubs in the lower amateur tiers.

For instance, in 2023 footballers Duarte Ferreira (1. SC Znojmo FK), Luís Pedro, João Rodrigues, Catalin Moraru, Keyner De Vasconcelos (all 1. SC Znojmo FK), Júnior Agostinho (FK Baník Sokolov), Jayden Luke Fernandes (Prague Raptors) were playing in the country. Dean da Lança was active as a coach to Prague Raptors.

== Remittances ==
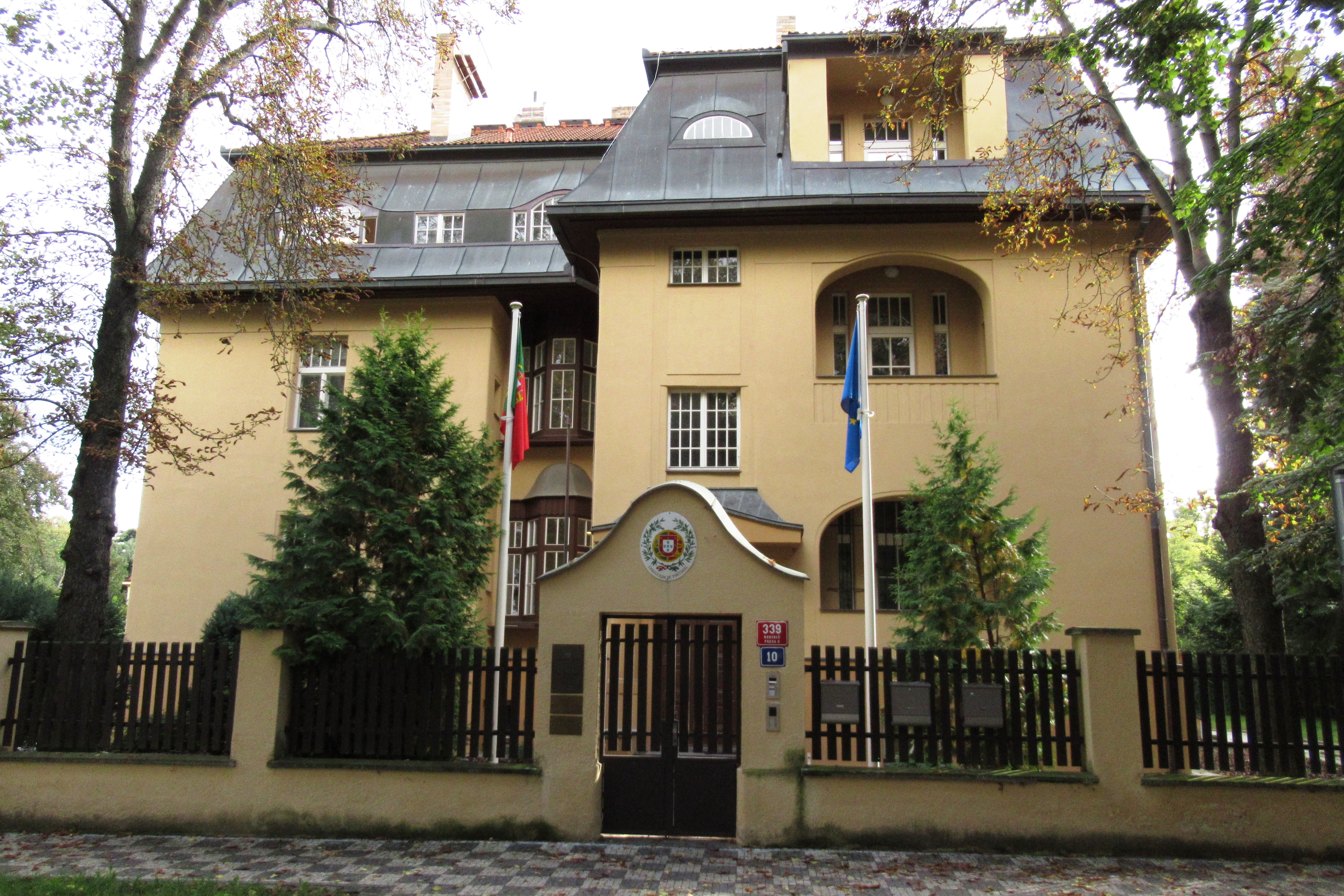
Portuguese embassy in Prague

The two countries enjoy friendly relationships and mutual trust, witnessing increasing trade as well.

The Portuguese community in the retains strong ties with its homeland and, between 2000 and 2021, it has sent approximately 10.08 million euros (€) to Portugal in remittances. In the same timeframe, Czechs in Portugal (numbering around 740 individuals) have sent approximately 33.5 million euros (€) to the Czech Republic

== Portuguese language ==
Despite the Portuguese language not being widely spoken in the Czech Republic there is interest towards Portuguese culture, literature and products. There is curiosity especially dealing with Portuguese cinema, art, poetry and culinary delicacies. Every year around 700 Czechs start studying Portuguese and the Czech Republic is a CPLP associate observer. The country also hosts Portuguese Cultural Institutes and its Universities offer Portuguese language courses; there is also a Portuguese school in Prague, designed for Lusophone expats' children. Dozens of businesses import Portuguese products (especially wines and cork) and in Prague there are also some cafés targeted at the Portuguese community, Portuguese tourists visiting the country (almost 40,000 in 2022) or – in most cases – Czechs curious about Portuguese culture.

As of today, the Portuguese are part of a wider Portuguese-speaking community in the Czech Republic, comprising around 285 people from PALOP countries (the majority being from Angola and Cape Verde), East Timor or Macau and around 1,500 Brazilians. People from CPLP countries thus number around 4,000 people, accounting for 0.04% of the population of the Czech Republic.

== See also ==
- Czech Republic-Portugal relations
- Portuguese diaspora
- Immigration to the Czech Republic
