= Minority languages of the Czech Republic =

Languages of Czech Republic
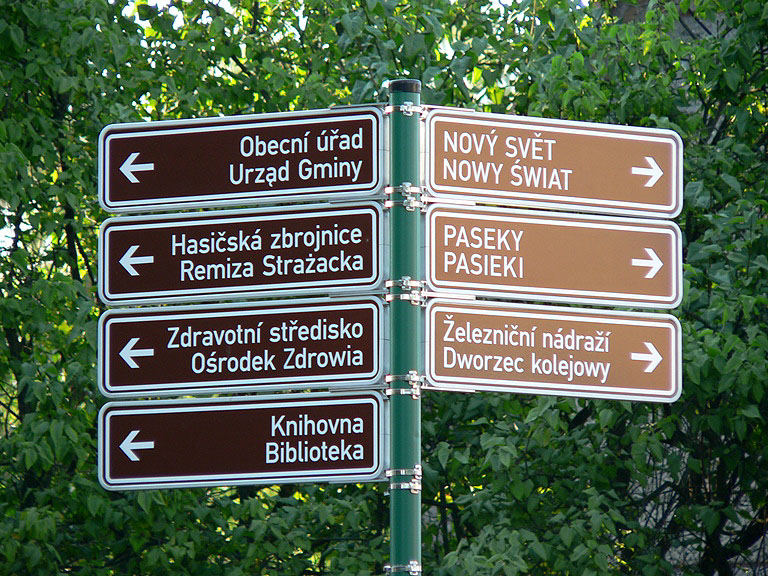
- Bilingual Czech–Polish signs in Albrechtice (Karviná District)
- Minority: Belarusian; Bulgarian; Croatian; German; Greek; Hungarian; Polish; Romani; Russian; Rusyn; Serbian; Slovak; Ukrainian; Vietnamese

The official language of the Czech Republic is Czech. Citizens belonging to minorities, which traditionally and on a long-term basis live within the territory of the Czech Republic, enjoy the right to use their language in communication with authorities and in courts of law.

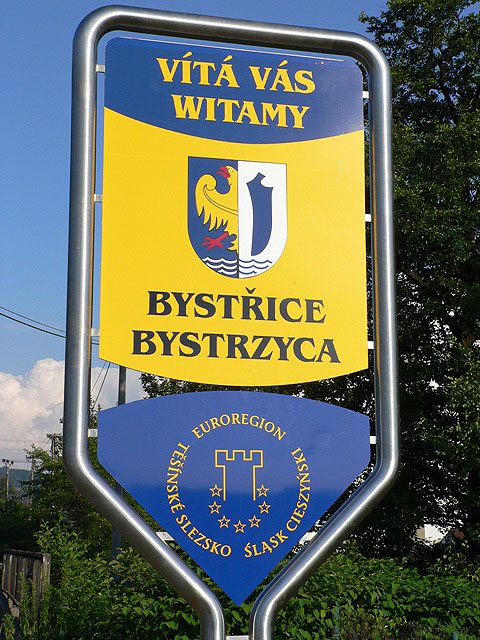
Bilingual Czech-Polish town sign in the Cieszyn Silesia Euroregion

As of 2021, the largest minority languages were Slovak, Ukrainian, Russian, Vietnamese, Polish, German, Romani, and Hungarian. Until almost all of its speakers were expelled in and after 1945, German used to be a very strong minority language that was spoken as mother tongue by over 30% of people living in the territory of the Czech Republic.

Today, only Polish is numerous and concentrated enough to result in significant language infrastructure, including bilingual place names in the Cieszyn Silesia region and access to Polish-language education where statutory conditions are met. Article 25 of the Czech Charter of Fundamental Rights and Freedoms ensures the right of the national and ethnic minorities to education and communication with the authorities in their own language. Act No. 500/2004 Coll. (The Administrative Rule) in its paragraph 16 (4) (Procedural Language) ensures that a citizen of the Czech Republic who belongs to a national or an ethnic minority, which traditionally and on a long-term basis lives within the territory of the Czech Republic, has the right to address an administrative agency or court of law and proceed before it in the language of the minority. If the administrative agency has no employee with knowledge of the language, the agency is bound to obtain a translator at the agency's own expense.

As of 2022 the officially recognized minorities are:

- Belarusians
- Bulgarians
- Croatians
- Germans
- Greeks
- Hungarians
- Poles
- Romani
- Russians
- Rusyns
- Serbs
- Slovaks
- Ukrainians
- Vietnamese

Resultingly, the following languages can be considered recognized minority languages:

- Belarusian
- Bulgarian
- Croatian
- German
- Greek
- Hungarian
- Polish
- Romani
- Russian
- Rusyn
- Serbian
- Slovak
- Ukrainian
- Vietnamese

The Slovak language may be considered an official language in the Czech Republic under certain circumstances, as defined by several laws.
