= Mongolians in the Czech Republic =

Total population
- 15,056 (February 2026)

Regions with significant populations
- Prague, Blansko, Plzeň

Languages
- Mongolian, Czech

Related ethnic groups
- Mongolian diaspora

Mongolians in the Czech Republic form one of the country's top 10 ethnic groups. The group has grown over the last decade and numbered 15,056 men and women holding Mongolian nationality by February 2026, up from 10,236 in June 2020. Approximately 2000 Mongolian children study at all school levels in Czechia.

Currently, large groups of Mongolians reside in the large cities as well as in the towns of Česká Lípa and Kutná Hora and its surrounding areas.

== Migration history ==
In 2005, only 1,900 Mongolians lived in the Czech Republic, according to the local police; by 31 March 2006, that figure had grown slightly to 2,607 individuals, including 2,051 workers and 213 businessmen. The following year would see significant growth in the Mongolian population, which nearly tripled to 7,515 individuals by June 2007. As of July 2008, an additional thirty to forty Mongolians were arriving in the Czech Republic for work every week, many via train. Their population had been expected to continue to grow at a rapid pace, since Mongolia, along with Vietnam, was chosen in 2008 as one of the nations to supply manpower to the Czech Republic to replace North Korean guest workers, whose visas were not renewed after international concern that their wages were being confiscated by the North Korean government and used to support their nuclear programme.

However, at the beginning of 2009, the Czech government decided they would no longer grant employment visas to Mongolian or Vietnamese labourers, in response to an economic downturn which had left 380,000 Czech citizens jobless. Visa issuance officially halted on 1 April that year; the government stated it would resume at some unspecified future date. They also announced a plan to offer €500 and a free plane ticket back to Ulaanbaatar for any Mongolian workers in the Czech Republic who lost their jobs; a spokeswoman for the Interior Ministry stated that the plan was intended to prevent unemployed foreign workers from remaining in the country illegally. From February–April, Mongolians formed 66% of the total 1,345 foreigners who took advantage of such offers from the Czech government. In May 2011, a group of ninety Mongolians sued the Czech government over the restricted access to work visas, and in particular for refusing to process their applications online through the Visapoint system.

In 2023, there were 11,696 Mongolian third-country nationals in the Czech Republic.

== Demography and distribution ==
Aside from the community in Prague, there are also about 500 Mongolians employed at a steering wheel-cover firm in the South Moravian Region town of Blansko, and a few hundred more in Plzeň.

== Illegal migration ==
Mongolians make up one of the larger groups of illegal migrants detained at the border with Slovakia. Previously, Ukraine had been one of the main sources of illegal foreign workers for the Czech Republic, but many had moved on westward to other countries of the European Union, lured by higher wages; Mongolians have been one of the main groups which has replaced them. The Czech government are working with the Mongolian government in efforts to control the illegal migration, in a programme similar to those they already operated with the governments of Moldova, Armenia, and Ukraine, which combined education in the source country about the danger of abuse that foreign workers face, and increased enforcement in the destination country.

There are fifteen Czech work agencies with permits from the Czech government to import workers from Mongolia. However, only two such agencies have permits from the Mongolian government to recruit on their territory; many thus operate without authorisation. This lack of registration is the reason why Czech government figures consistently show a large number of migrants from Mongolia—such as a total of 2,000 in 2007—while Mongolian government statistics show just a small number of workers leaving their country with the Czech Republic as their destination.

== Notable individuals ==
- Gombojavyn Ochirbat, former General Secretary of the Mongolian People's Revolutionary Party, lived in Prague for two years

== See also ==
- Petra Hulova, a Czech writer who studied in Mongolia
