= Foreign relations of Slovakia =

The Slovak Republic has been a member of European Union since 2004. Slovakia has been an active participant in U.S.- and NATO-led military actions. There is a joint Czech-Slovak peacekeeping force in Kosovo. After the September 11, 2001 Terrorist Attack on the United States, the government opened its airspace to coalition planes. In June 2002, Slovakia announced that they would send an engineering brigade to Afghanistan.

Slovak Republic is a member of the United Nations and participates in its specialized agencies. It is a member of the Organization for Security and Cooperation in Europe (OSCE), the World Trade Organization (WTO), and the OECD. It also is part of the Visegrád Group (Slovakia, Hungary, Czech Republic, and Poland), a forum for discussing areas of common concern. Slovak Republic and the Czech Republic entered into a Customs Union upon the division of Czechoslovakia in 1993, which facilitates a relatively free flow of goods and services. Slovak Republic maintains diplomatic relations with 190 countries.

== International disputes ==
=== Liechtenstein ===
Liechtenstein claims restitution of land in Slovakia confiscated from its princely family in 1918 by the then newly established state of Czechoslovakia, the predecessor of the Slovak Republic. The Slovak Republic insists that the power to claim restitution does not go back before February 1948, when the Communists seized power. Slovakia and Liechtenstein established diplomatic relations on 9 December 2009.

=== Hungary ===
Bilateral government, legal, technical and economic working group negotiations continued in 2006 between Slovakia and Hungary over Hungary's completion of its portion of the Gabcikovo-Nagymaros hydroelectric dam project along the Danube.

== Multilateral agreements ==
In July 2022 after the Russian invasion of Ukraine the Prime Minister of Slovakia Eduard Heger made it known that he had entered discussions with the Czech Republic over the protection of Slovak airspace by Czech warplanes in the event that the Slovaks were to donate to Ukraine the remnants of the Slovak MiG-29 fighter jet fleet, in advance of the fleet's replacement and renewal (at the earliest in 2023) by American F-16 warplanes. The transaction would also include the remnants of Slovakia's Soviet-era T-72 tanks. Czech PM Peter Fiala agreed with this initiative, which had been proposed by Ukrainian President Zelensky. The transaction was set to occur in September 2022. In April 2023 it was confirmed that 13 Mig-29 fighters and 30 BVP-1 infantry fighting vehicles were delivered to Ukraine by Slovakia.

== International human rights criticism ==
In June 2020, Slovakia openly opposed the Hong Kong national security law.

== Diplomatic relations ==
List of countries which Slovakia maintains diplomatic relations with:

#	Country	Date
1	Albania	1 January 1993
2	Algeria	1 January 1993
3	Argentina	1 January 1993
4	Australia	1 January 1993
5	Austria	1 January 1993
6	Belgium	1 January 1993
7	Brazil	1 January 1993
8	Bulgaria	1 January 1993
9	Canada	1 January 1993
10	Chile	1 January 1993
11	China	1 January 1993
12	Colombia	1 January 1993
13	Croatia	1 January 1993
14	Cuba	1 January 1993
15	Cyprus	1 January 1993
16	Czech Republic	1 January 1993
17	Denmark	1 January 1993
18	Ecuador	1 January 1993
19	Egypt	1 January 1993
20	El Salvador	1 January 1993
21	Eswatini	1 January 1993
22	Finland	1 January 1993
23	France	1 January 1993
24	Germany	1 January 1993
25	Greece	1 January 1993
26	Guyana	1 January 1993
—	Holy See	1 January 1993
27	Hungary	1 January 1993
28	Iceland	1 January 1993
29	India	1 January 1993
30	Indonesia	1 January 1993
31	Iran	1 January 1993
32	Iraq	1 January 1993
33	Ireland	1 January 1993
34	Israel	1 January 1993
35	Italy	1 January 1993
36	Jamaica	1 January 1993
37	Kazakhstan	1 January 1993
38	Kuwait	1 January 1993
39	Kyrgyzstan	1 January 1993
40	Laos	1 January 1993
41	Latvia	1 January 1993
42	Lebanon	1 January 1993
43	Libya	1 January 1993
44	Luxembourg	1 January 1993
45	Malaysia	1 January 1993
46	Malta	1 January 1993
47	Mauritania	1 January 1993
48	Mongolia	1 January 1993
49	Morocco	1 January 1993
50	Myanmar	1 January 1993
51	Netherlands	1 January 1993
52	New Zealand	1 January 1993
53	North Korea	1 January 1993
54	Norway	1 January 1993
55	Pakistan	1 January 1993
—	State of Palestine	1 January 1993
56	Peru	1 January 1993
57	Philippines	1 January 1993
58	Poland	1 January 1993
59	Portugal	1 January 1993
60	Qatar	1 January 1993
61	Romania	1 January 1993
62	Russia	1 January 1993
63	Rwanda	1 January 1993
64	San Marino	1 January 1993
65	Senegal	1 January 1993
66	Serbia	1 January 1993
67	Slovenia	1 January 1993
68	South Africa	1 January 1993
69	South Korea	1 January 1993
—	Sovereign Military Order of Malta	1 January 1993
70	Spain	1 January 1993
71	Sweden	1 January 1993
72	Switzerland	1 January 1993
73	Syria	1 January 1993
74	Tanzania	1 January 1993
75	Thailand	1 January 1993
76	Tunisia	1 January 1993
77	Turkey	1 January 1993
78	Turkmenistan	1 January 1993
79	Uganda	1 January 1993
80	Ukraine	1 January 1993
81	United Kingdom	1 January 1993
82	United States	1 January 1993
83	Uruguay	1 January 1993
84	Venezuela	1 January 1993
85	Vietnam	1 January 1993
86	Yemen	1 January 1993
87	United Arab Emirates	3 January 1993
88	Nicaragua	5 January 1993
89	Costa Rica	6 January 1993
90	Lithuania	6 January 1993
91	Seychelles	6 January 1993
92	Paraguay	8 January 1993
93	Belarus	14 January 1993
94	Kenya	15 January 1993
95	Benin	19 January 1993
96	Uzbekistan	20 January 1993
97	Maldives	21 January 1993
98	Japan	3 February 1993
99	Tajikistan	4 February 1993
100	Mali	12 February 1993
101	Singapore	12 February 1993
102	Estonia	15 February 1993
103	Panama	15 February 1993
104	Sri Lanka	15 February 1993
105	Moldova	16 February 1993
106	Democratic Republic of the Congo	18 February 1993
107	Jordan	3 March 1993
108	Oman	3 March 1993
109	Zimbabwe	3 March 1993
110	Bolivia	5 March 1993
111	Bangladesh	12 March 1993
112	Guinea	16 March 1993
113	São Tomé and Príncipe	2 April 1993
114	Cape Verde	7 April 1993
115	Guatemala	15 April 1993
116	Zambia	5 May 1993
117	Sudan	27 July 1993
118	Nigeria	1 September 1993
119	Angola	30 September 1993
120	Ghana	1 October 1993
121	Mexico	1 October 1993
122	Armenia	14 November 1993
123	Cameroon	15 November 1993
124	Georgia	25 November 1993
125	Azerbaijan	27 November 1993
126	Malawi	30 December 1993
127	Nepal	4 March 1994
128	North Macedonia	4 March 1994
129	Barbados	14 April 1994
130	Gabon	14 July 1994
131	Eritrea	26 February 1995
132	Bahrain	21 March 1995
133	Niger	26 April 1995
134	Lesotho	8 May 1995
135	Ethiopia	10 May 1995
136	Mozambique	10 May 1995
137	Mauritius	31 May 1995
138	Saudi Arabia	6 June 1995
139	Gambia	18 August 1995
140	Bosnia and Herzegovina	28 December 1995
141	Madagascar	16 February 1996
142	Sierra Leone	21 May 1996
143	Brunei	4 June 1996
144	Andorra	3 July 1996
145	Fiji	8 July 1996
146	Belize	6 August 1996
147	Togo	4 January 1997
148	Cambodia	20 February 1997
149	Burkina Faso	1 August 1997
150	Haiti	26 September 1997
151	Guinea-Bissau	8 October 1997
152	Namibia	9 November 1997
153	Equatorial Guinea	7 December 1997
154	Liberia	6 March 1998
155	Trinidad and Tobago	28 May 1998
156	Republic of the Congo	30 June 1998
157	Saint Vincent and the Grenadines	9 December 1998
158	Marshall Islands	29 January 1999
159	Grenada	23 February 1999
160	Antigua and Barbuda	21 June 1999
161	Burundi	29 June 1999
162	Papua New Guinea	29 October 1999
163	Samoa	16 March 2000
164	Chad	20 April 2000
165	Djibouti	22 November 2000
166	Dominican Republic	20 March 2001
167	Botswana	29 March 2001
168	Suriname	12 March 2002
169	Timor-Leste	17 October 2002
170	Ivory Coast	28 October 2002
171	Honduras	27 May 2004
172	Bahamas	28 May 2004
174	Tuvalu	30 January 2006
174	Dominica	7 February 2006
175	Montenegro	28 June 2006
176	Federated States of Micronesia	13 September 2006
177	Palau	24 September 2007
178	Monaco	13 December 2007
179	Saint Kitts and Nevis	26 September 2008
180	Saint Lucia	23 September 2009
181	Liechtenstein	21 December 2009
182	Solomon Islands	15 March 2011
183	Nauru	24 June 2011
184	South Sudan	12 December 2011
185	Afghanistan	17 January 2012
186	Bhutan	26 September 2012
187	Somalia	23 May 2013
188	Comoros	6 June 2017
189	Vanuatu	25 September 2025
190	Central African Republic	25 November 2025

== Bilateral relations ==
=== Multilateral ===
Organization	Formal Relations Began	Notes
European Union		See 2004 enlargement of the European Union Slovakia joined the European Union as a full member on 1 May 2004.
NATO		Slovakia joined NATO as a full member on 29 March 2004.

=== Africa ===
Country	Formal Relations Began	Notes
Kenya		See Kenya–Slovakia relations

=== Americas ===
Country	Formal Relations Began	Notes
Belize	1994	Slovakia is accredited to Belize from its embassy in Mexico City, Mexico.
Canada		Canada recognized Slovak independence in January 1993, and established diplomatic relations a year later.; Canada has an embassy office in Bratislava.; Slovakia has an embassy in Ottawa and a consulate-general in Toronto.; Canadian Ministry of Foreign Affairs and International Trade about relations with Slovak Republic
Colombia	1 January 1993	Colombia is accredited to Slovakia through its embassy in Vienna, Austria.; Slovakia is accredited to Colombia from its embassy in Brasilia, Brazil.; Slovakia backed-up Colombia's entry into the OECD and was a key player in the ratification of the Colombia-European Union Free Trade Agreement.
Dominica		Slovakia is accredited to Dominica from its embassy in Havana, Cuba.
Mexico	1 January 1993	See Mexico–Slovakia relations In November 2017, Slovak President Andrej Kiska paid an official visit to Mexico.: Mexico is accredited to Slovakia from its embassy in Vienna, Austria and maintains an honorary consulate in Bratislava.; Slovakia has an embassy in Mexico City.
United States	1 January 1993	See Slovakia–United States relations: Slovakia has an embassy in Washington, D.C., and a consulate-general in New York City.; United States has an embassy in Bratislava.

=== Asia ===
Country	Formal Relations Began	Notes
Armenia	1994	Formal relations were started in 1994; Armenia is represented in Slovakia through its embassy in Vienna (Austria).; Slovakia has an embassy in Yerevan.; Both countries are full members of the Organization for Security and Co-operation in Europe and of the Council of Europe.; Slovakia recognized the Armenian genocide in 2004.; Between 24 February and 28 February 2008, Slovak Foreign Minister Ján Kubiš, made an official visit to Armenia.
China		See China–Slovakia relations: China has an embassy in Bratislava.; Slovakia has an embassy in Beijing and a consulate-general in Shanghai.
India	August 1995	See India-Slovakia relations Since August 1995 India has an embassy in Bratislava and Slovakia has an embassy in New Delhi. The Slovak Government welcomed and appreciated the opening of the Embassy of India, Bratislava (one of 32 resident missions) in August 1995, which was agreed during the former PM Moravcik's visit to India and considered it as a further indication of India's interest in enhancing relations with Slovakia.
Israel	1993	See Israel–Slovakia relations Both countries established diplomatic relations in 1993. Israel has an embassy in Bratislava.: Israel has an embassy in Bratislava.; Slovakia has an embassy in Tel Aviv.; See also History of the Jews in Slovakia.
South Korea	22 March 1990	See Slovakia-South Korea relations The establishment of diplomatic relations between the Republic of Korea and the Slovak Republic began on 22 March 1990.: First Vice Foreign Minister Cho Tae-yong and his Slovak counterpart Peter Burian signed the Implementing Programme for Cooperation in the Fields of Culture Education Sport and Tourism between the Ministry of Foreign Affairs of the Republic of Korea and the Ministry of Foreign and European Affairs of the Slovak Republic at the Foreign Ministry in Seoul on 17 March.; The Implementing Programme aims to facilitate cooperation between the Republic of Korea and Slovakia in the fields of culture education sport and tourism, including people-to-people and content exchanges It also encourages the two countries to participate in cultural and sport events hosted by the other country.; This Implementing Programme is the first implementing programme signed since the Republic of Korea and Slovakia concluded the Agreement on Cooperation in the Fields of Culture, Education and Tourism in 2007. The Implementing Programme is expected to contribute to expanding bilateral exchanges and promoting friendly relations by encouraging the two countries to implement cooperation programs in culture, education, sport and tourism for the next three years.; Slovak embassy in Seoul.; South Korean embassy in Bratislava.
Turkey		See Slovakia–Turkey relations: Slovakia has an embassy in Ankara and an consulate-general in Istanbul.; Turkey has an embassy in Bratislava.; Both countries are full members of NATO.
Vietnam		See Slovakia–Vietnam relations

=== Europe ===
Country	Formal Relations Began	Notes
Albania		See Albania–Slovakia relations The multi-national Communist armed forces' sole joint action was the Warsaw Pact invasion of Czechoslovakia in August 1968. All member countries, with the exception of the People's Republic of Albania and the Socialist Republic of Romania participated in the invasion. Albania formally withdrew form the Warsaw Pact in 1968 over the matter.: Albania has an embassy in Bratislava.; Slovakia has an embassy in Tirana.
Austria		See Austria–Slovakia relations: Austria has an embassy in Bratislava.; Slovakia has an embassy in Vienna and 3 honorary consulates (in Innsbruck, Linz and Salzburg).; Both countries share 91 km of common borders.; There are around 25,000 people of Slovak descent living in Austria.; Slovakia joined the European Union as a full member on 1 May 2004, while Austria joined on 1 January 1995.; Austria Ministry of Foreign Affairs: list of bilateral treaties with Slovakia (in German only)
Bulgaria	1 January 1993	See Bulgaria–Slovakia relations: Both countries had diplomatic relations for the first time between 1939 and 1945.; Bulgaria recognized Slovakia on 23 December 1992.; Since February 1994, Bulgaria has embassy in Bratislava.; Since June 1994, Slovakia has embassy in Sofia.; Both countries are full members of the Council of Europe, of the Organization for Security and Co-operation in Europe, of NATO and of the European Union.
Croatia		See Croatia–Slovakia relations: Croatia has an embassy in Bratislava.; Slovakia has an embassy in Zagreb.; Both countries are full members of the European Union and NATO.
Cyprus		Cyprus is represented in Slovakia through its embassy in Vienna (Austria).; Slovak Republic has an embassy in Nicosia and an honorary consulate in Limassol.; Both countries are full members of the European Union.; Cyprus Ministry of Foreign Affairs: list of bilateral treatis with Slovakia
Czech Republic		See Czech Republic–Slovakia relations
Denmark	1993	See Denmark–Slovakia relations: Denmark has an embassy in Bratislava.; Slovakia has an embassy in Copenhagen.; Both countries are full members of NATO and of the European Union.
Estonia		See Estonia–Slovakia relations
Germany	1993	See Germany–Slovakia relations
Greece	1 January 1993	Greece opened its embassy in Bratislava in September 1996.
Hungary	1993	See Hungary–Slovakia relations: Hungary has an embassy in Bratislava.; Slovak Republic has an embassy Budapest and a general consulate in Békéscsaba.
Latvia		Both countries established direct diplomatic relations on 1 January 1993. Latvia is represented in Slovakia through its embassy in Vienna (Austria). Slovakia has an embassy in Riga. Both countries are full members of NATO and of the European Union. Latvian Foreign Minister Indulis Berzins and his Slovak counterpart Eduard Kukan met in Riga in 2000.
Malta		See Malta–Slovakia relations Malta is represented in Slovakia through a non-resident ambassador based in Valletta (in the Foreign Ministry). Slovakia is represented in Malta through its embassy in Rome (Italy) and an honorary consulate in Valletta.: Both countries are full members of the European Union.
Netherlands	1 January 1993	The Netherlands have an embassy in Bratislava.
Poland	1993	See Poland–Slovakia relations: Poland has an embassy in Bratislava.; Slovakia has an embassy in Warsaw and a general consulate in Kraków.; Both countries are full members of NATO and of the European Union.; Both countries share 539 km of common borders.
Romania	1 January 1993	See Romania–Slovakia relations: Romania has an embassy in Bratislava and two honorary consulates in Banská Bystrica and Stará Ľubovňa.; Slovakia has an embassy in Bucharest and an honorary consulate in Salonta.; Both members are full members of: NATO and European Union; Romanian Ministry of Foreign Affairs about relations with Slovakia
Russia	1 January 1993	See Russia–Slovakia relations: Russia opened its embassy in Bratislava in 1993.; Slovakia has an embassy in Moscow.; https://web.archive.org/web/20180308103617/http://www.rusemb.sk/
Serbia	1993	See Serbia–Slovakia relations; also see Slovakia's reaction to the 2008 Kosovo declaration of independence: Serbia has an embassy in Bratislava.; Slovakia has an embassy in Belgrade.; Serbia is an EU candidate and Slovakia is an EU member.; Serbian Ministry of Foreign affairs about the relation with Slovakia
Spain		See Slovakia–Spain relations: Slovakia has an embassy in Madrid.; Spain has an embassy in Bratislava.; Both countries are full members of NATO and of the European Union.
Ukraine	1 January 1993	See Slovakia–Ukraine relations: Slovakia has an embassy in Kyiv, a general consulate in Uzhhorod, a and 2 honorary consulates (in Donetsk and Uzhhorod).; Ukraine has an embassy in Bratislava and a consulate-general in Prešov.; Both countries shares 90 km of common borders.; There are between 40,000 and 100,000 people of Ukrainian descent living in Slovakia.; During the Interwar era the Ukrainian province Zakarpattia Oblast was part of Czechoslovakia.
United Kingdom	1993	See Slovakia–United Kingdom relations British Prime Minister Theresa May with Slovak Prime Minister Robert Fico in Bratislava, July 2016. Slovakia established diplomatic relations with the United Kingdom on 1 January 1993.: Slovakia maintains an embassy in London.; The United Kingdom is accredited to Slovakia through its embassy in Bratislava.; Both countries share common membership of the Council of Europe, the European Court of Human Rights, the International Criminal Court, NATO, the OECD, the OSCE, the United Nations, and the World Trade Organization. Bilaterally the two countries have a Double Taxation Convention.

=== Oceania ===
Country	Formal Relations Began	Notes
Australia	1 January 1993	Australia is accredited to Slovakia through its embassy in Vienna, Austria.; Slovakia has an embassy in Canberra and 2 honorary consulates in Brisbane and Melbourne.; There are around 8,500 people of Slovak descent living in Australia.; Australian Department of Foreign affairs and Trade about the relation with Slovakia

== See also ==
- List of diplomatic missions in Slovakia
- Ministry of Foreign Affairs (Slovakia)
- Slovak passport
