= Kenya–Slovakia relations =

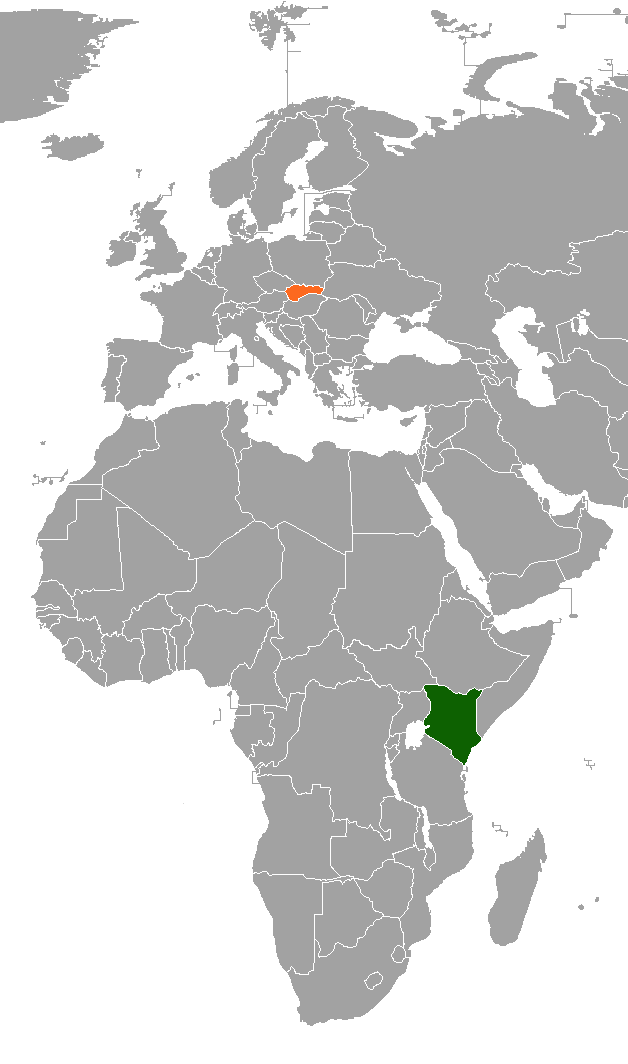
- Kenya: Slovakia

Kenya–Slovakia relations are the bilateral relations between Kenya and Slovakia.

== History ==
Deputy Prime Minister and Foreign Minister of Slovakia, Miroslav Lajčák visited Kenya in 2014. He held talks with Kenya's Cabinet Secretary for Foreign Affairs and the Kenyan President.

== Development cooperation ==
Kenya became a Slovakaid program country in 2014, resulting in the Slovak government aiding projects worth KES. 206 million (EUR. 2 million). They mostly focus on healthcare, education, agriculture and public administration. Other areas of focus are employment, democracy and good governance. Kenya is one of two African countries under SlovakAid programmes.

The Slovak republic joined the EU's joint programming efforts in Kenya in 2017. In 2019, SAIDC signed a contract for a grant release to Self help Africa to manage the program. The cooperation was to span from 2018 to 2023, and was focused on the agricultural sector, through participation in the broader AGRIFL program.

Both countries also cooperate in trade, energy (nuclear), construction, transport, infrastructure, engineering, water, agriculture and information technologies.

Approximately 2,000 Slovaks visit Kenya annually.

=== Nuclear power ===
Slovakia is assisting Kenya develop its nuclear capacity, so that Kenya can meet its future energy needs. Kenya aims to train 100 students annually and one of the countries where students are going to study at is Slovakia.

== Trade ==
In 2011, trade between Kenya and Slovakia was worth KES. 632 million (EUR. 5.84 million). Kenya exported goods worth KES. 65.99 million (EUR. 0.61 million) to Slovakia and imported goods worth KES. 570 million (EUR. 5.27 million) from Slovakia.

Kenya's main exports to Slovakia include: cut flowers, legumes, fruits, nuts, coffee, and iron and steel screws and bolts.

Slovakia's main exports to Kenya include: paper, automobiles, fertilisers, machinery & equipment, computers and electronics.

== Resident diplomatic missions ==
- Kenya is accredited to Slovakia from its embassy in Vienna, Austria.
- Slovakia has an embassy in Nairobi.

== See also ==
- Foreign relations of Kenya
- Foreign relations of Slovakia
