= India–Slovakia relations =

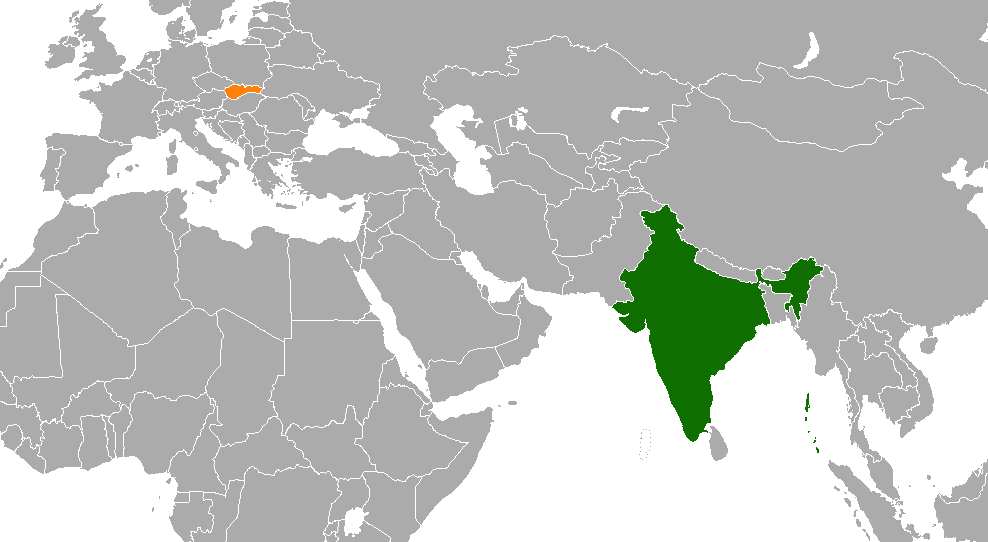
- India: Slovakia

India–Slovakia relations are the bilateral ties between India and Slovakia. Both countries established relations in 1921 with a Czechoslovak consulate in Bombay. Modern relations began in 1993 after the dissolution of Czechoslovakia.

Slovakia has an embassy in New Delhi. It also has Honorary Consuls in Mumbai, Kolkata, and Bangalore. India operates an embassy in Bratislava. Both nations are free from any bilateral problem, and they cooperate well in international forums.

== See also ==
- Foreign relations of Slovakia
- Foreign relations of India
