= China–Slovakia relations =

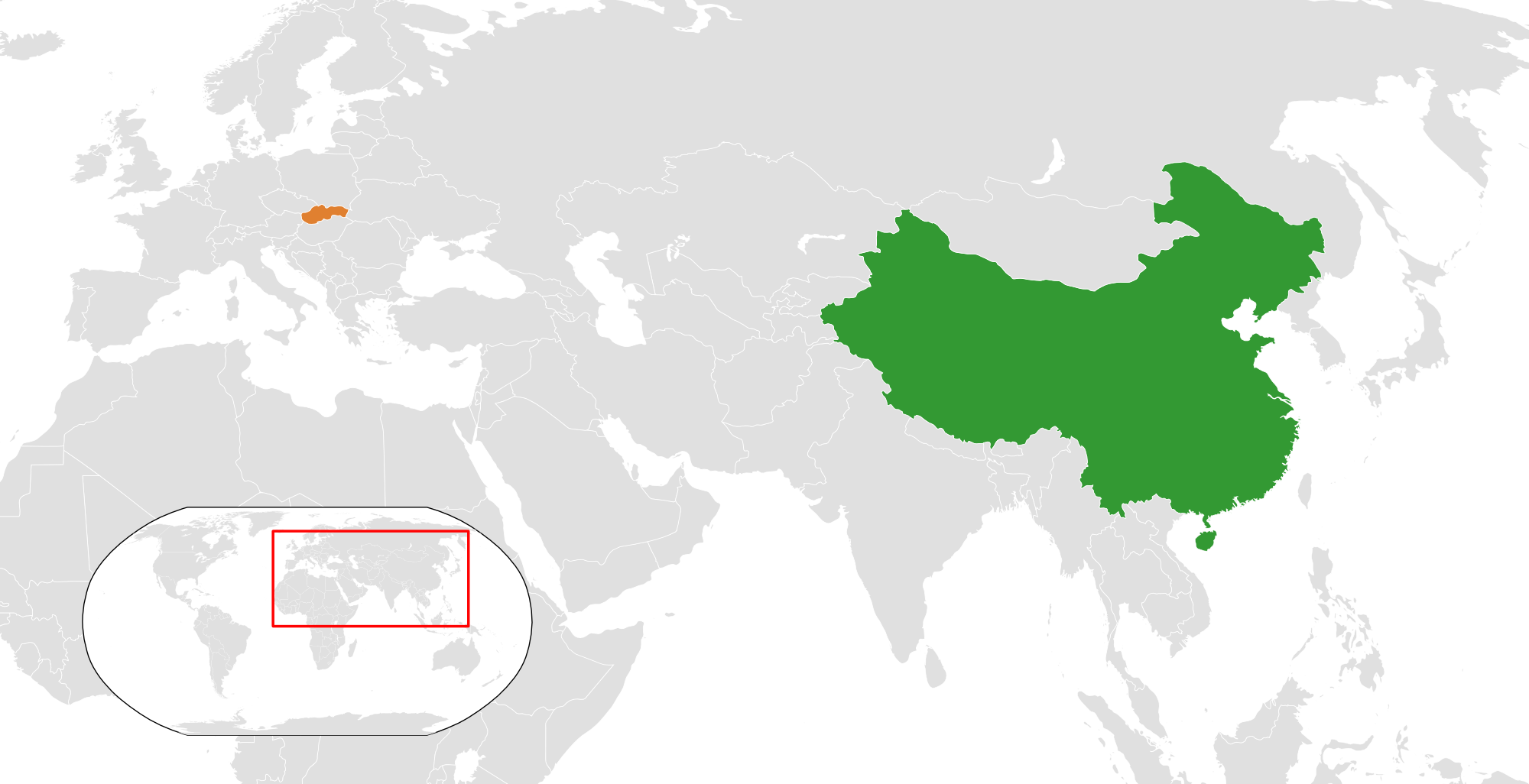
- China: Slovakia

Diplomatic mission
- Slovak Embassy, Beijing: Chinese Embassy, Bratislava

China–Slovakia relations refers to the bilateral relations between the People's Republic of China and the Slovak Republic. There were official relations by 1919 and formally established relations followed on 6 October 1949 between Czechoslovakia and China. On 1 January 1993, the newly independent Slovakia established diplomatic relations with China. The PRC has an embassy in Bratislava. Slovakia has an embassy in Beijing and a consulate-general in Shanghai.

== History ==
On 1 January 1993, the newly independent Slovakia was recognized by the PRC. In 2008, Slovak President Ivan Gašparovič attended the opening ceremony of the Beijing Olympic Games. The following year, Chinese President Hu Jintao visited Slovakia and met with a delegation of Chinese entrepreneurs in Slovakia.

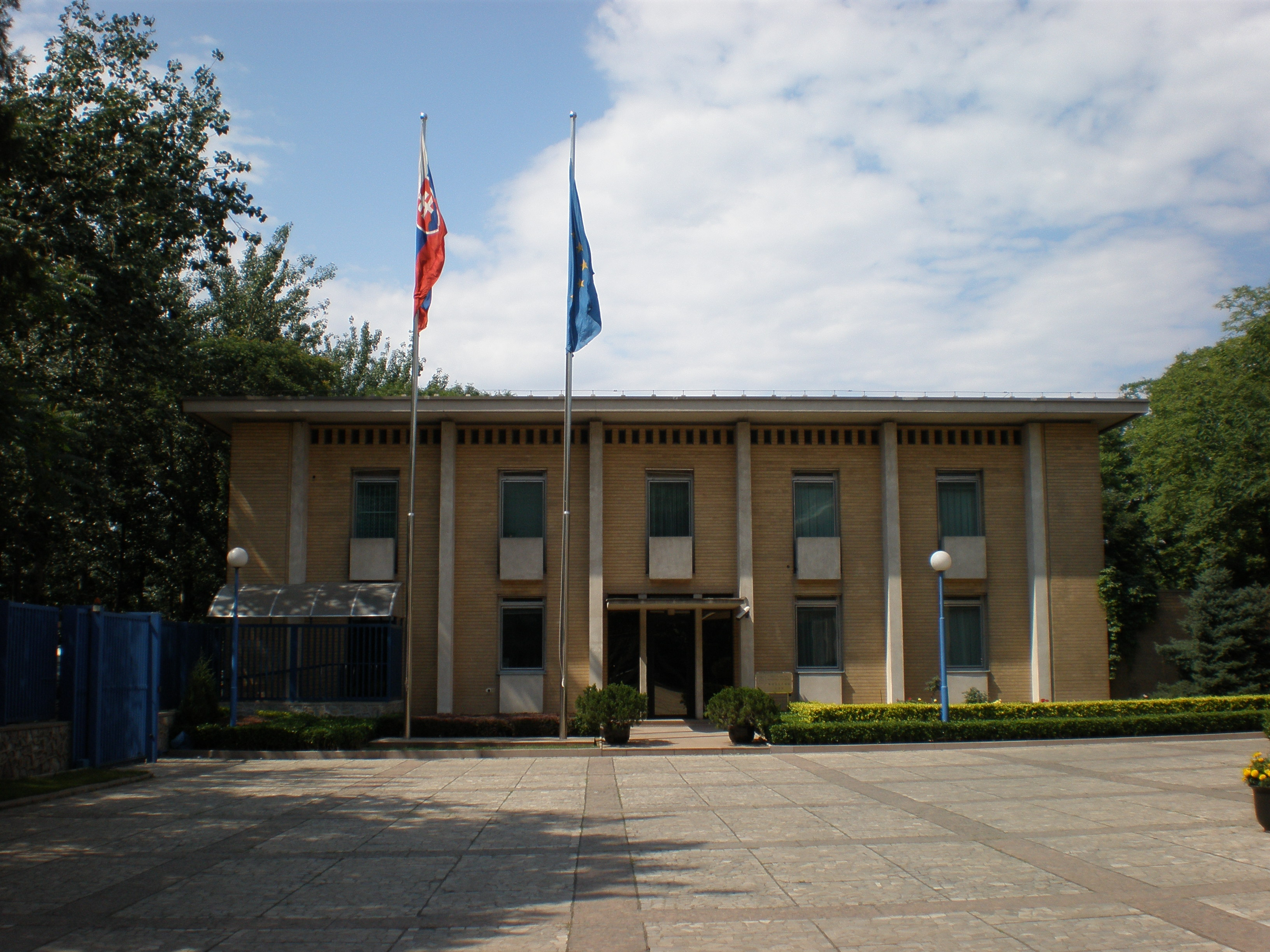
Slovak embassy in Beijing

Slovakia under the premiership of Robert Fico has been in favor of closer relations with China. His government voted against European Union tariffs on Chinese electric vehicles in 2024. Fico visited China in 2024, where he called for expanded trade and invested cooperation and praised China's peace plans for Ukraine.

In September 2025, Robert Fico was the only leader of an EU member state to take part in the commemorative events marking the 80th anniversary of the Chinese people's victory in the War of Resistance against Japan and the end of World War II in Beijing.

== Economic relations ==
Slovakia joined the Belt and Road Initiative in 2015.

According to Chinese customs statistics, in 2019, the trade volume between China and Slovakia reached US$8.892 billion, a year-on-year increase of 14.3%. Slovakia is China's fourth largest trading partner in Central and Eastern Europe. China's main exports to Slovakia include liquid crystal display screens and automotive reciprocating piston engines. China's imports from Slovakia are mainly automobile products. As of the end of 2019, China's direct investment stock in Slovakia was US$82.74 million.

Trade volume between China and Slovakia (Unit: 10,000 US dollars)
years	Chinese exports to Slovakia	Chinese imports from Slovakia	Total trade volume between the two sides	China's trade surplus
2015	279,509	223,730	503,238	55,779
2016	286,125	240,990	527,114	45,135
2017	272,960	258,500	531,460	14,460
2018	253,584	524,447	778,031	-270,863
2019	292,401	596,812	889,213	-304,411
2020	303,310	643,145	946,455	-339,835

== Cultural relations ==
In February 1994, China and Slovakia signed the 1994-1995 Cultural Cooperation Plan. In the same month, China held the "Tibet Art Exhibition" in the Slovak capital. In July 2008, China held the "Perceiving China·China-Europe Tour" large-scale cultural event in Slovakia, and Slovakia held the "Slovak Film Week" in China. In 2015, China held a photo exhibition and the "Chinese Film Week" in Slovakia to commemorate the 70th anniversary of the Second Sino-Japanese War. In October 2016, the China-Czech Republic-Slovakia Friendship Museum opened. The Slovak Embassy in China's Chargé d'Affaires Thomas Felix and other diplomatic envoys from 21 countries attended the ribbon-cutting ceremony. In addition, some Slovak scholars have translated Chinese classical literary works into Slovak.

Since the beginning of the 21st century, China has strengthened its cooperation with Slovakia in the field of education, and Chinese has become one of the more influential foreign languages in Slovakia. In May 2007, Tianjin University in China and the Slovak University of Technology in Bratislava jointly established the Bratislava Confucius Institute. Later, Comenius University and the Slovak Medical University also established Confucius Institutes for Slovak students to learn Chinese. In China, universities such as Beijing Foreign Studies University and Beijing International Studies University also offer Slovak language majors.

== Transportation ==
There are no direct flights between the two countries. Chinese citizens traveling to Slovakia can take a direct flight from Beijing to Vienna, Austria, and then take a bus to Bratislava, which takes about 45 minutes. Since the launch of the China-Europe Express in 2015, China has had several international freight trains departing from Yingkou, Dalian and Xi’an for Slovakia, changing tracks in the border town of Dobra between Ukraine and Slovakia.

== Medical assistance ==
During World War II, Czechoslovak medical doctor F. Kisch joined the medical team that aided China. The names of the medical team members are engraved in Guiyang Forest Park.

After the COVID-19 outbreak in China, Slovakia donated US$200,000 to China. After the outbreak in Slovakia in March 2020, China assisted Slovakia in purchasing and transporting back about 100 tons of anti-epidemic materials from China, including various masks, protective clothing, and testing kits. In April 2020, anti-epidemic materials donated by Chinese cities such as Beijing, Shanghai, and Cangzhou arrived at Bratislava Airport. Chinese Ambassador to Slovakia Sun Lijie, Director of the Office of the Slovak Prime Minister's Office Jakub, and some media went to the airport to welcome them.

== Resident diplomatic missions ==
- China has an embassy in Bratislava.
- Slovakia has an embassy in Beijing and a consulate-general in Shanghai.

== See also ==
- Foreign relations of China
- Foreign relations of Slovakia
