= Bulgaria–Slovakia relations =

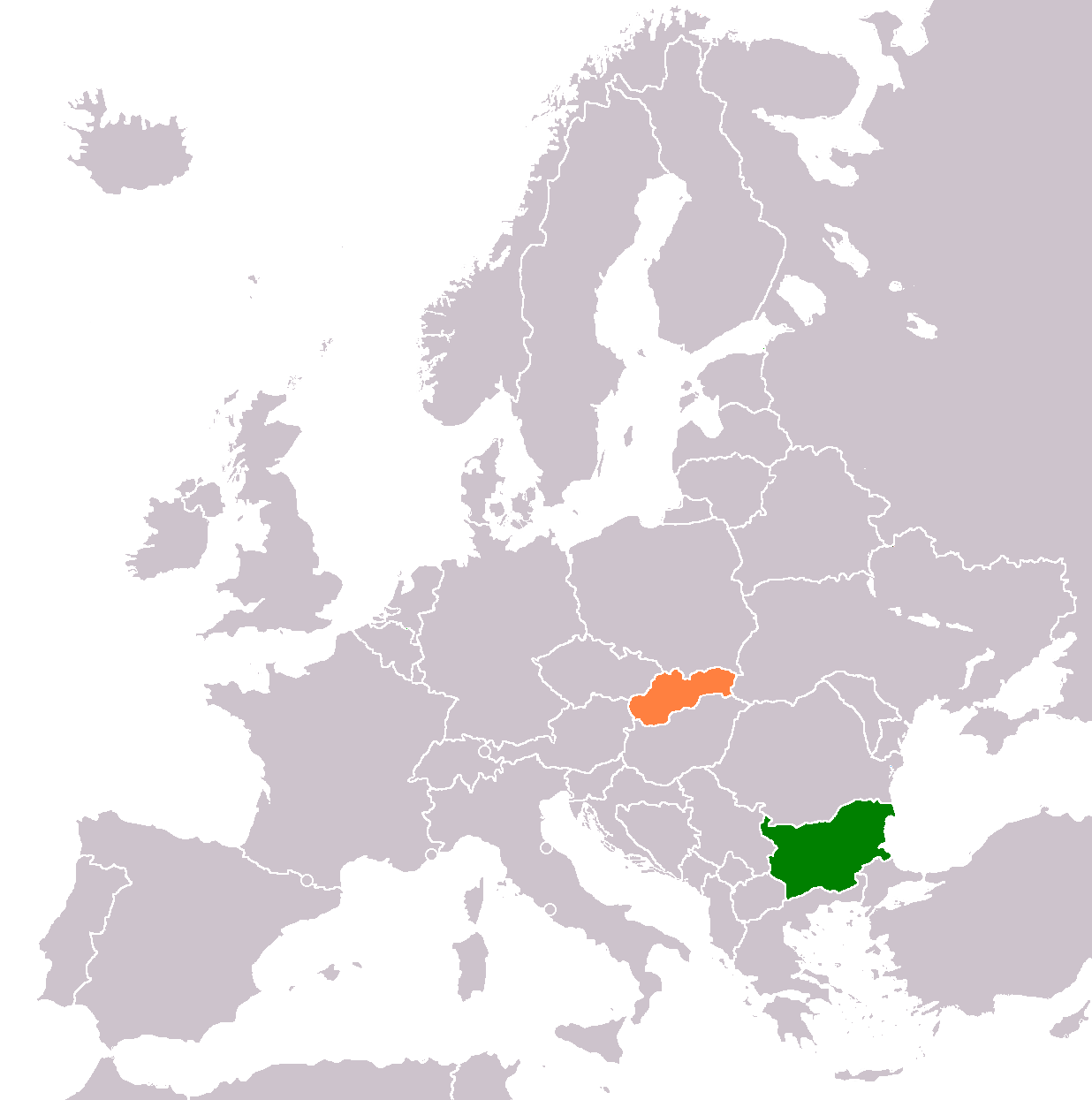

- Bulgaria: Slovakia

Bulgaria–Slovakia relations are foreign relations between Bulgaria and Slovakia. Bulgaria originally established diplomatic ties with Czechoslovakia in 1920. Slovakia declared independence from Czechoslovakia in 1993, and was briefly independent during World War II as the Slovak Republic (1939-1945). Bulgaria and Slovakia established diplomatic relations for the first time between 1939 and 1945. Both countries re-established diplomatic relations on January 1, 1993. Since February 1994, Bulgaria has an embassy in Bratislava. Since June 1994, Slovakia has an embassy in Sofia. Both countries are full members of the European Union and NATO.

== Resident diplomatic missions ==
- Bulgaria has an embassy in Bratislava.
- Slovakia has an embassy in Sofia.

== See also ==
- Foreign relations of Bulgaria
- Foreign relations of Slovakia
