= Albania–Slovakia relations =

- Albania: Slovakia

Diplomatic mission
- Embassy of Albania Bratislava: Embassy of the Slovak Republic; Tirana

Albania–Slovakia relations are the bilateral relations between Albania and Slovakia. Albania has an embassy in Bratislava. Slovakia has an embassy in Tirana. Both countries are members of the Council of Europe and the Organization for Security and Co-operation in Europe.

== Background ==
Diplomatic relations have existed in the context of relations with Czechoslovakia since 1945, and later, as two separate republics, relations were established on January 4, 1993. Both countries focus on democracy and economic development through open and free trade, as evidenced in both bilateral and multilateral aspects.

Slovakia has consistently supported Albania's integration efforts in the European Union. In this regard, a Memorandum of Cooperation on European Integration Concerns was signed between the two countries in March 2015, during the visit to Tirana of the then Slovakia's Minister of Foreign and European Affairs, Miroslav Lajčák. Albania has received this support in all high-level discussions in relation to the efforts that Albania has taken in recent years in the European integration process. Following the successful model of the Visegrad International Fund, the Slovak Republic also offered help to the WBF (Western Balkans Fund) and its Secretariat in Tirana.

The only issue of contention between the two countries is Slovakia's decision not to recognize the independence of Kosovo.

== Economic relations ==
As of 2022, Slovakia's export to Albania is worth € 29 million and Albania's export to Slovakia is worth € 38 million.

== See also ==
- Foreign relations of Albania
- Foreign relations of Slovakia
- Accession of Albania to the EU
- NATO-EU relations
