= Denmark–Slovakia relations =

- Denmark: Slovakia

Denmark–Slovakia relations refers to the current and historical relations between Denmark and Slovakia. Denmark has an embassy in Bratislava. Slovakia has an embassy in Copenhagen. The relations between Denmark and Slovakia are described as good and friendly. Denmark has a trade office in Slovakia. Both countries are full members of the European Union and NATO. On 4 September 2002, a memorandum of understanding between the two countries, were signed.

In December 2024, Slovakia closed its embassy in Copenhagen.

== Trade ==
Trade are below average, than the other Visegrád Group countries. To develop the economic relations, a Commercial and Economic office was created in 1994. In 1994, an environmental protection agreement was signed. ECCO opened a production facility in 1998, in Slovakia. Falck operated from 2006 in Slovakia, and opened 37 new fire stations. Oxymat, has a headquarters in Slovakia.

== State visits ==
Danish Prime Minister Anders Fogh Rasmussen visited Slovakia in 2002, for a meeting with Slovak President Rudolf Schuster.

== Diplomatic missions ==
- Denmark has an embassy in Bratislava.
- Slovakia is accredited to Denmark from its embassy in Stockholm, Sweden.

== See also ==
- Foreign relations of Denmark
- Foreign relations of Slovakia
