= Slovakia–Vietnam relations =

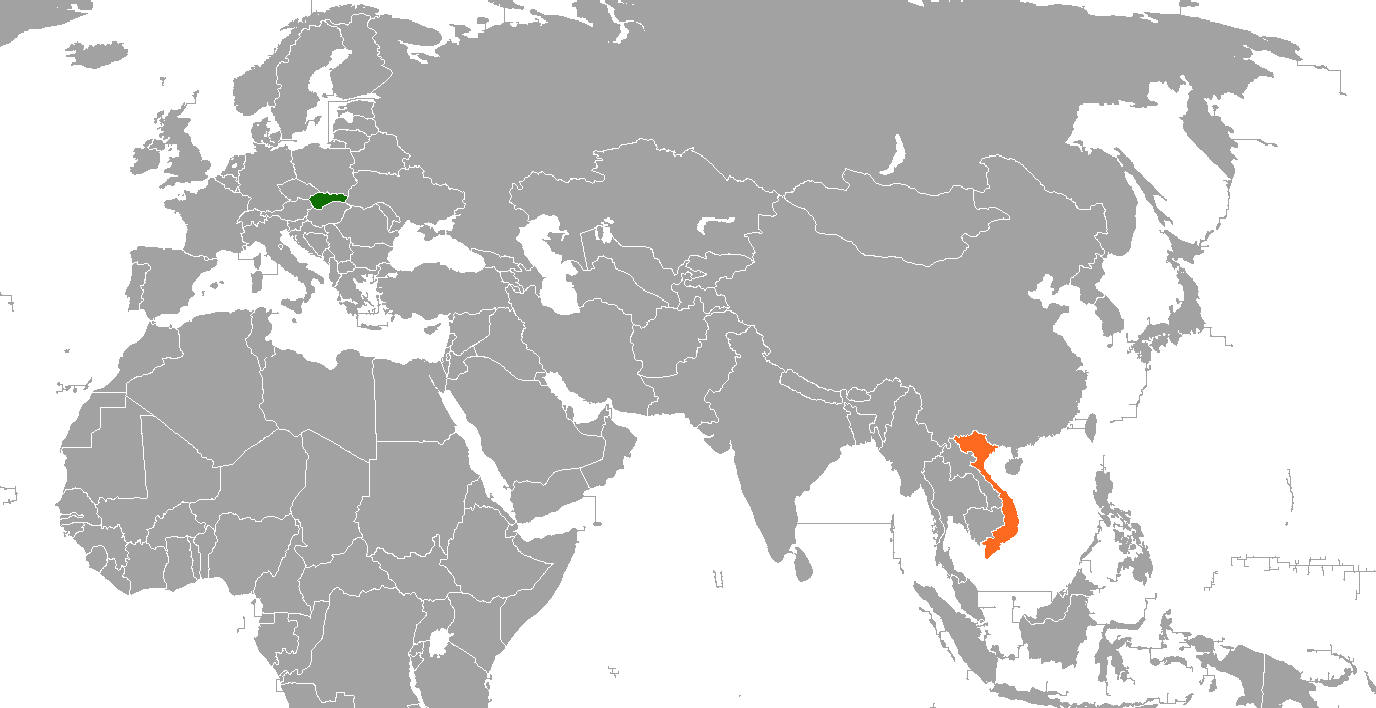
- Slovakia: Vietnam

Slovakia–Vietnam relations refers to the bilateral relations between Slovakia and Vietnam. Slovakia has an embassy in Hanoi with a consulate in Ho Chi Minh City; and Vietnam has an embassy in Bratislava.

== History and modern ties ==
The foreign relations between Czechoslovakia and the Democratic Republic of Vietnam (which later became North Vietnam from 1954) were established on February 2, 1950. As Czechoslovakia was in the Eastern Bloc, it did not recognize the South Vietnamese Republic. DRV leader Ho Chi Minh, paid a visit to Slovakia at 1957, with his visit was memorized with the unveil of plaque over Ho's visit to the country.

When the Czech Republic and Slovakia gained independence on 1 January 1993, both countries inherited all the established relations between former Czechoslovakia and Vietnam. From that point on, Slovakia has maintained a relatively close relationship with Vietnam.

=== 2017 kidnap of Trinh Xuan Thanh ===
Trịnh Xuân Thanh, a former communist party member and businessman who was accused of being corrupt, was secretly abducted and kidnapped in Berlin by a group of unnamed Vietnamese personnel believed to be Vietnamese agents in Germany. The kidnappers were found to have used Slovak airspace and Slovak Government's jet to take Trịnh away from the country; this had prompted angers and threaten to freeze Slovak–Vietnamese relationship. The case was dismissed after unable to collect enough evidences over the abduction, but tensions over the abduction of Trịnh Xuân Thanh still persists in the political relationship between two.

In 2019, during a visit, Angela Merkel, Chancellor of Germany, retold the abduction to its Slovak counterpart, making it complicated.

== Vietnamese in Slovakia ==
Despite sharing common Czechoslovak heritage and Vietnamese immigration, the Vietnamese community in Slovakia remains less relevant in comparison to its neighbor, Czech Republic. Like most of Vietnamese people in Eastern Europe, they are perceived as well-integrated in the Slovak society.

== Resident diplomatic missions ==
- Slovakia has an embassy in Hanoi.
- Vietnam has an embassy in Bratislava.

== See also ==
- Foreign relations of Slovakia
- Foreign relations of Vietnam
