= Russia–Slovakia relations =

- Russia: Slovakia

Diplomatic mission
- Embassy of Russia, Bratislava: Embassy of Slovakia, Moscow

Russia–Slovakia relations (Russian: Российско-словацкие отношения, Slovak: Rusko-slovenské vzťahy) date back to when diplomatic relations were established upon Slovakia gaining its independence on January 1, 1993. Russia opened its embassy in Bratislava in 1993. Slovakia also has an embassy in Moscow. Unlike Slovakia's neighbour and close ally Czech Republic, which has a negative view of Russia due to past events, Slovakia tends to have better relations with Russia.

== Russian invasion of Ukraine ==
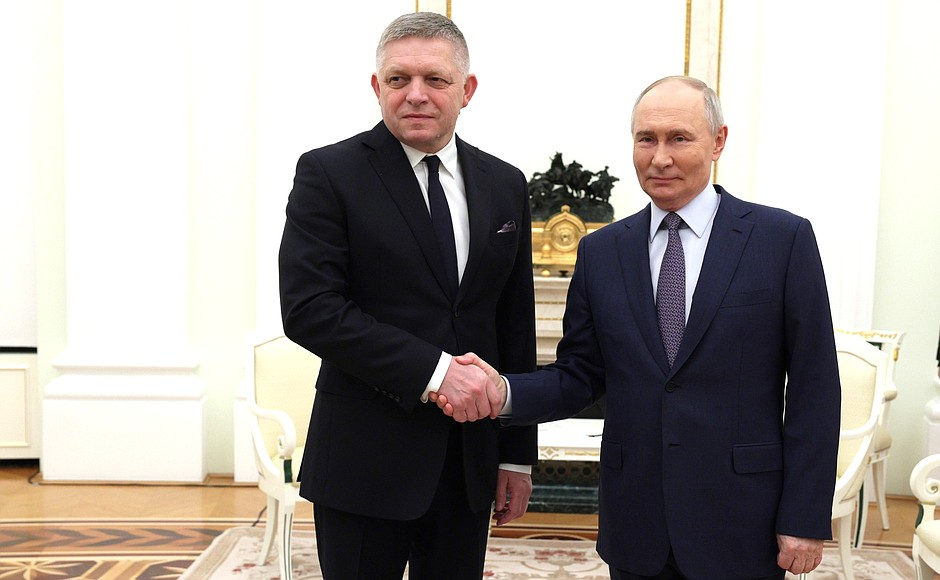
Fico meeting Russian president Vladimir Putin in Moscow, 22 December 2024

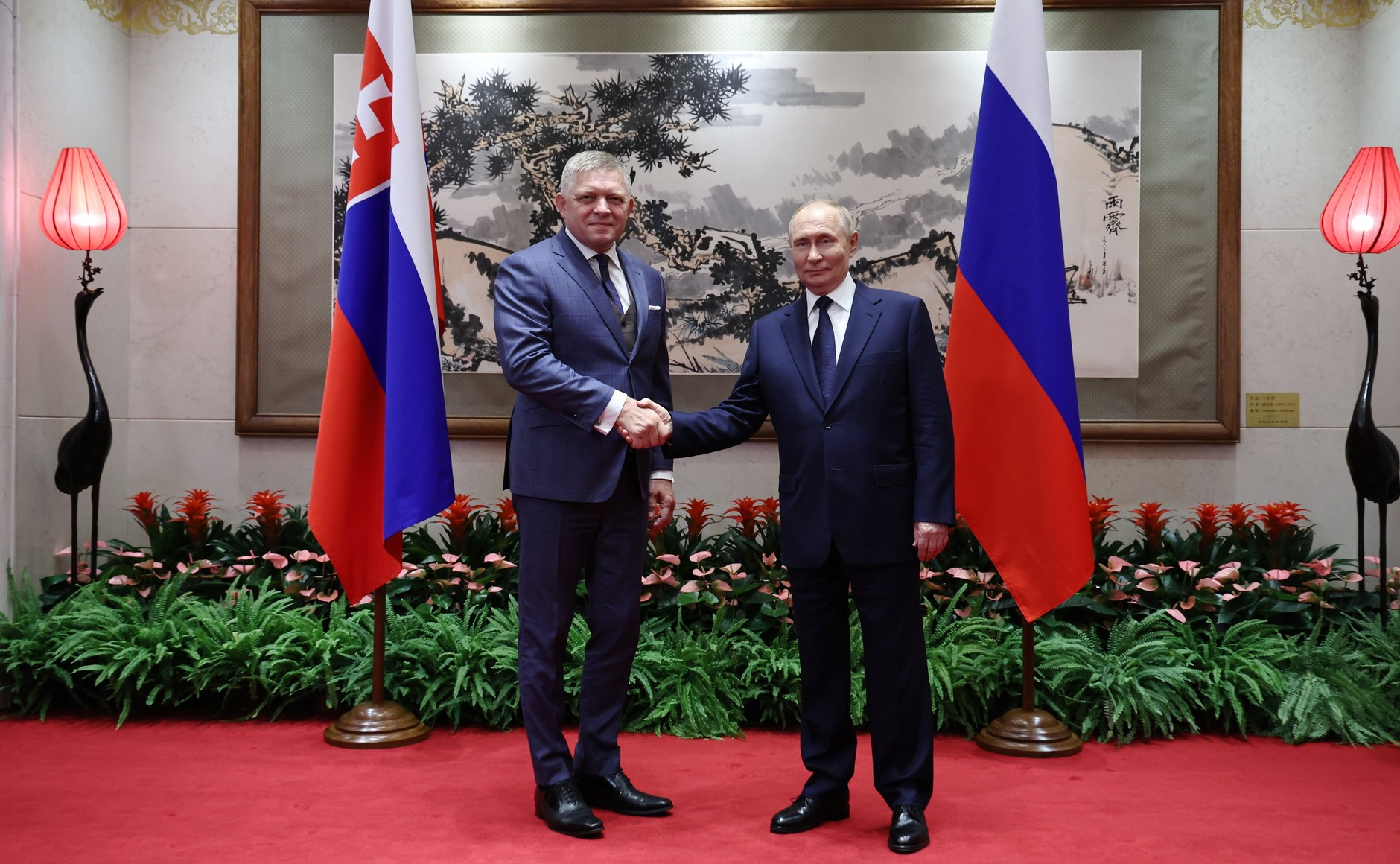
Fico meeting Russian president Vladimir Putin in Beijing, China, 2 September 2025

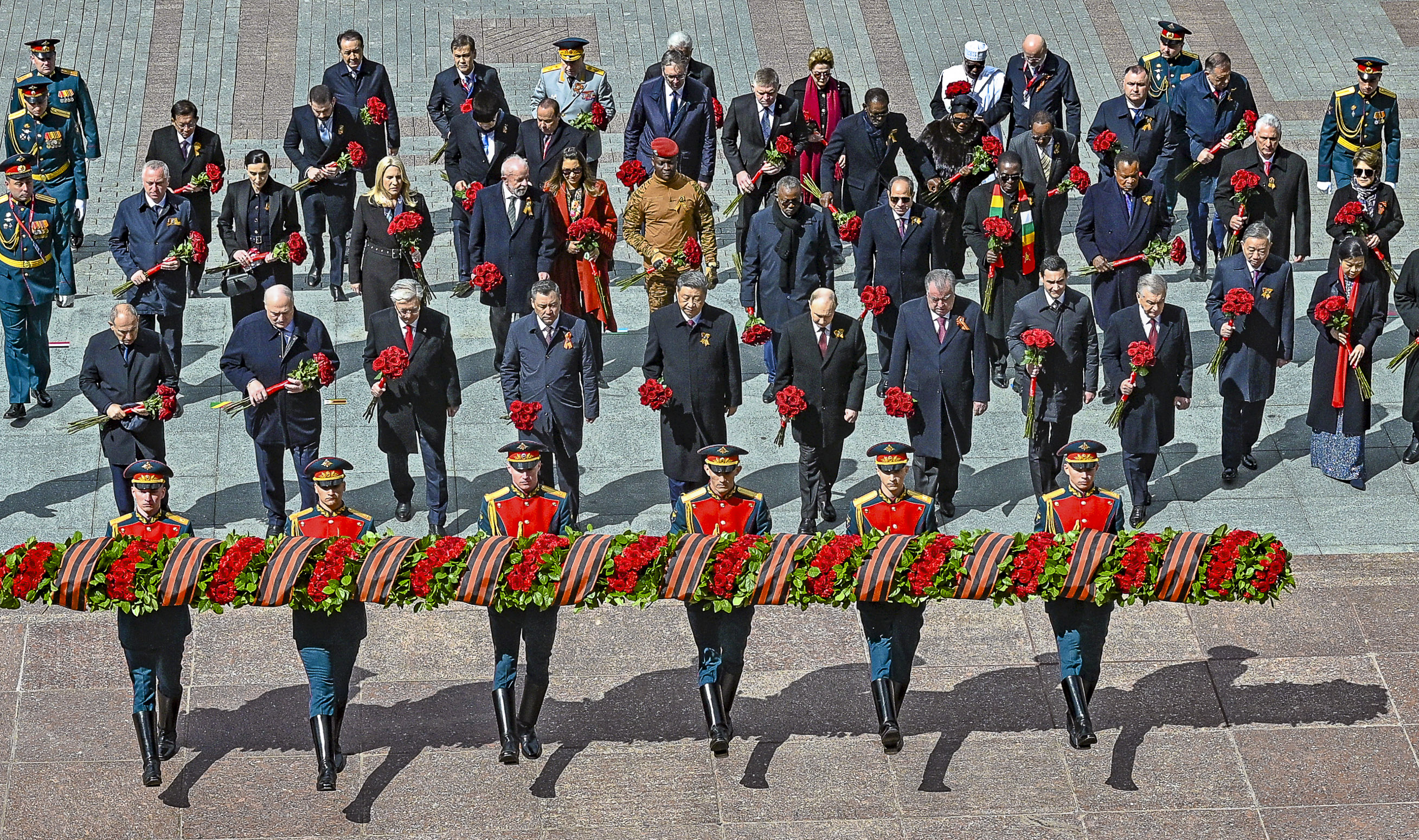
Fico (in the middle of the last row) was the only leader of an EU member state to attend the Russian Victory Day parade in Moscow, Russia, 9 May 2025

After the Russian invasion of Ukraine started, Slovakia, as one of the EU countries, imposed sanctions on Russia, and Russia added all EU countries to the list of "unfriendly nations".

Slovakia joined other countries in spring 2022 in declaring a number of Russian diplomats persona non grata.

On 16 February 2023, Slovakia's parliament defined the Putin regime as "terrorist" and formally designated Russia as a state sponsor of terrorism.

On 2 October 2023, Slovakia recognized rapprochement with Russia. On 25 October 2023, Robert Fico became the Prime Minister of Slovakia

On 20 January 2024, Slovakia's Culture Ministry said that Slovakia would resume cultural exchange with Russia and Belarus.

Fico met with Russian president Vladimir Putin in December 2024 in Moscow to discuss primarily the transfer of Russian gas to Slovakia. He became the third Western leader to do so since the war started.

In May 2025, Fico was the only leader of an EU member state who attended the Russian Victory Day parade.

== Trade ==
In 2021 Russia exported $6.05 billion of goods to Slovakia with natural gas being the main product. Slovakia exports were $1.98 billion with cars being the main product. Between 1995 and 2021 Russian exports have risen by an average of 8.14% p.a. whereas Slovakia’s exports rose by 7.19% p.a. on average.

Slovakia is making plans on disconnecting from Russia's energy exports in accordance with EU decisions and sanctions following the 2022 Russian invasion of Ukraine. In April 2023 Minister of Energy Peter Gerhardt dismissed Russian attempts to blackmail his country over energy supplies, although Russian crude, gas and nuclear fuel dominate the market in Slovakia. Gerhardt refused to cower over his country's support for Ukraine. 60 percent of its natural gas, 95 percent of its oil and all of its nuclear fuel are obtained by Slovakia from Russia. Slovakia’s main petroleum refinery was built to process Urals grade crude and thus “big investments” will be needed by it to accept other types of crude.

In August 2023 the result of an international tender for the supply of nuclear fuel was won by Westinghouse. Rosatom was excluded from bidding.

It was reported in May 2024 that Economy Minister Denisa Saková said Rosatom would not be allowed to participate in a possible tender to build the next nuclear power plant in Slovakia, which generates over 50% of its electricity at its existing nuclear plants.

== Resident diplomatic missions ==
- Russia has an embassy in Bratislava.
- Slovakia has an embassy in Moscow.
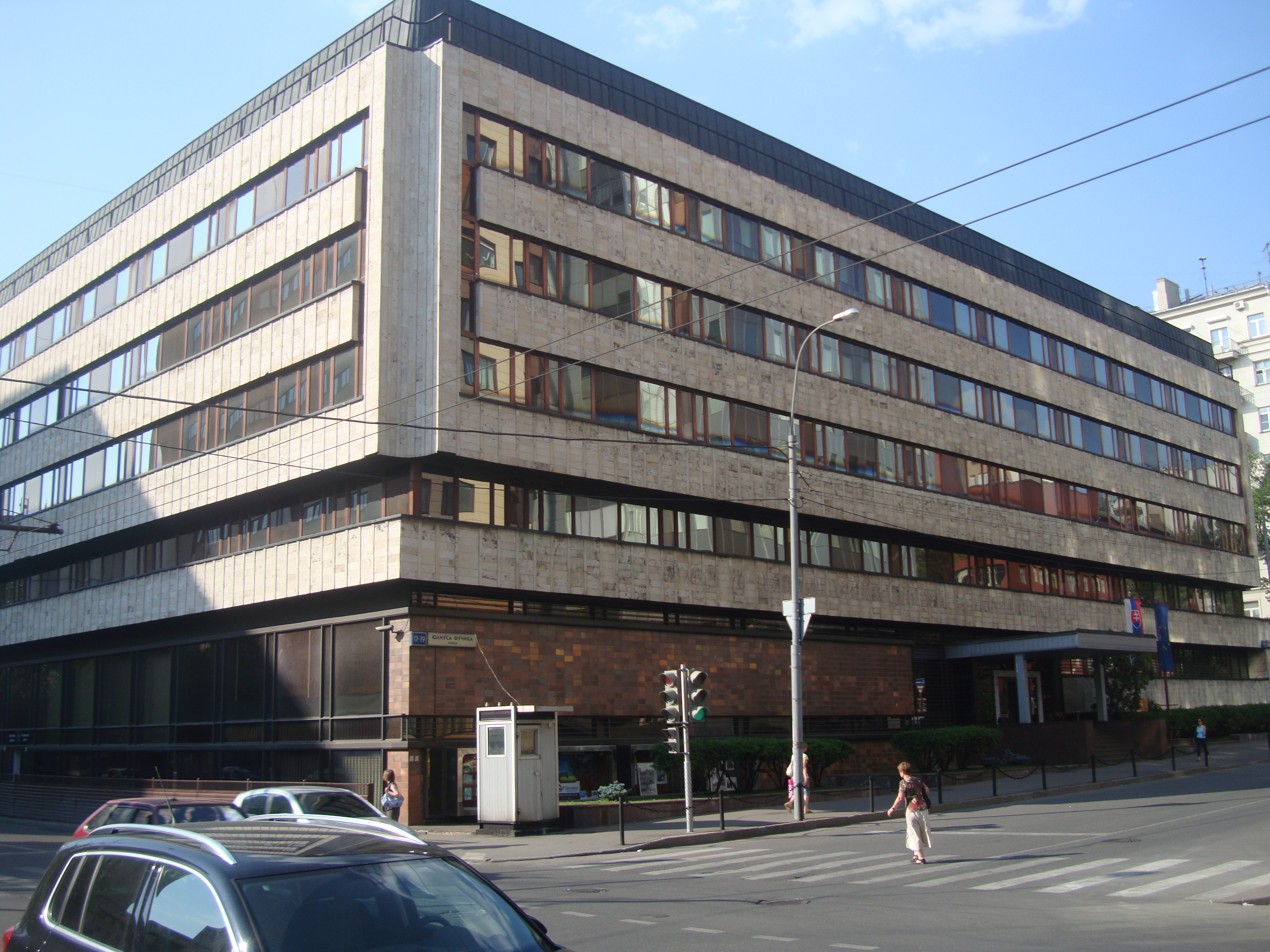
Embassy of Slovakia in Moscow

== See also ==
- Foreign relations of Russia
- Foreign relations of Slovakia
