= Slovaks in the Czech Republic =

Ethnic group

Slovak citizens in the Czech Republic as of December 31, 2025
Year	Pop.	±%
2011	81,253	—
2012	85,807	+5.6%
2013	90,948	+6.0%
2017	111,804	+22.9%
2018	116,817	+4.5%
2019	121,278	+3.8%
2020	124,544	+2.7%
2021	114,630	−8.0%
2022	117,265	+2.3%
2023	119,182	+1.6%
2024	121,471	+1.9%
2025	125,280	+3.1%

Slovaks are the second-largest ethnic minority in the Czech Republic, after the Moravians, who are native to the country. The American CIA puts them at 1.9% of the country's total population. Larger numbers of them can be found in the country's east, especially Ostrava and Brno, as the Czech Republic shares a border in the east with Slovakia. Brno especially is popular among Slovak university students.

== Statistics ==
According to the 2021 census, ethnic Slovaks and people with some form of Slovak background formed 1.54% of the population of the Czech Republic (including those who included Slovak as their second ethnicity). In absolute numbers, that meant 162,578 people. People with Slovak ancestry can be found throughout the Czech Republic.

Rank	Region	Number of Slovaks	Share (%)
1	Prague	31,987	2.46
2	Moravian-Silesian	23,514	2.02
3	Central Bohemian	22,453	1.59
4	South Moravian	21,094	1.76
5	Ústí nad Labem	9,886	1.25
6	Plzeň	7,596	1.31
7	Olomouc	7,474	1.21
8	Zlín	6,938	1.23
9	South Bohemian	6,406	1.01
10	Karlovy Vary	5,745	2.06
11	Liberec	5,607	1.29
12	Hradec Králové	5,577	1.04
13	Pardubice	4,938	0.97
14	Vysočina	3,363	0.68

== Notable Czechs of Slovak origin ==
- Andrej Babiš, politician, businessman and prime minister
- Martina Dubovská, alpine skier

== See also ==
- Czech Republic–Slovakia relations
- Slovak diaspora
- Demographics of the Czech Republic
- Czechs in Slovakia
