= Slovakia–Spain relations =

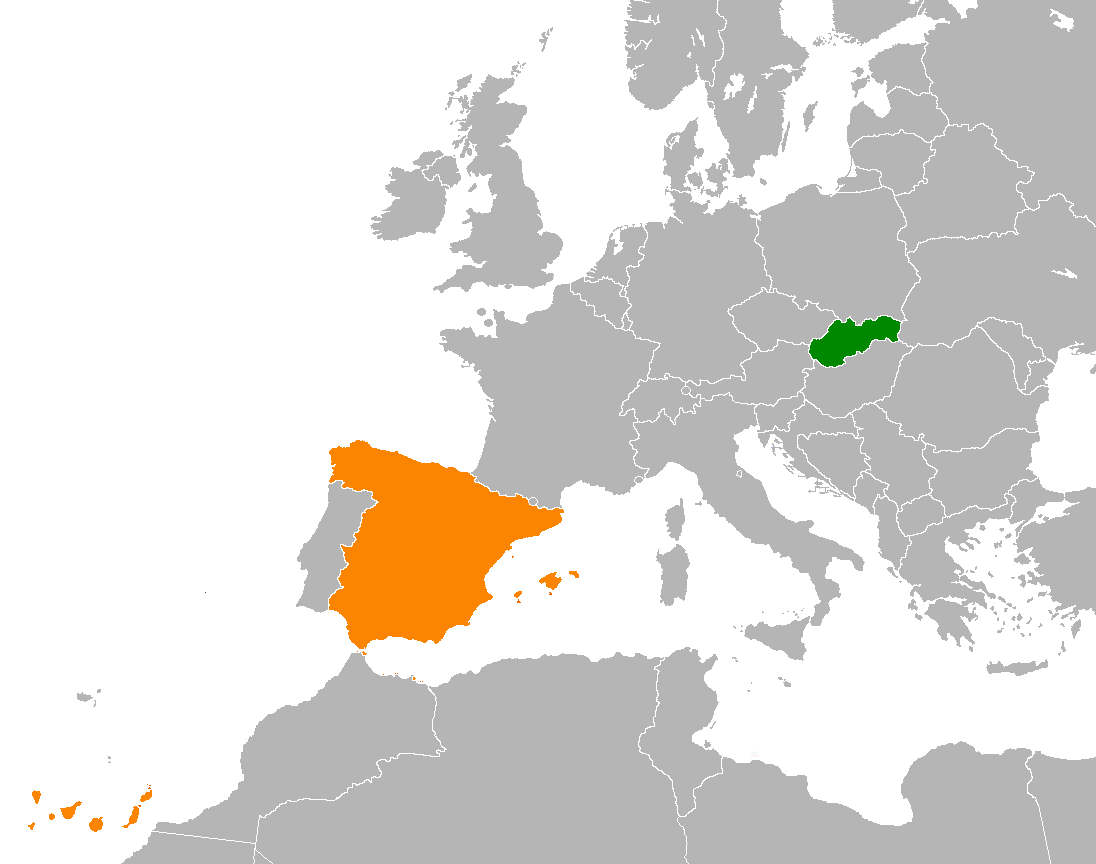
- Slovakia: Spain

Slovakia–Spain relations are the bilateral relations between Slovak Republic and the Kingdom of Spain. The relations of these two countries are defined mainly by the membership of both the European Union and NATO. On the occasion of the celebration of the 25th anniversary of the independence of the Slovak Republic (1 January 1993) from Czechoslovakia, Ambassador Vladimír Grácz and his lady offered a brilliant reception on 11 January 2019. The protocol act began with the interpretation of the anthems of Spain and Slovakia. Ambassador Grácz confirmed that “relations with Spain are impeccable, of excellent collaboration, of great harmony and mutual support in the candidacies for international institutions. Economic relations are fantastic, as are cultural relations. On a personal basis he acknowledges that Spain is a wonderful country, which he has been able to get to know in the company of his wife".

== Economic relations ==
=== Spain-Slovakia trade balance ===
- Spanish imports from Slovakia (in millions of euros): 1,557.49 (2020) 1,824.68 (2021) 2,079.98 (2022)
- Spanish exports to Slovakia (in millions of euros): 1,138.27 (2020) 1,337.21 (2021) 1,494.30 (2022)
- Balance (in millions of euros): -419.22 (2020) -487.47 (2021) -585,68 (2022)
- Coverage rate %: 73.08 (2020) 73.28 (2021) 71.84 (2022)
- % Import variation (1): -31.23 (2020) 17.16 (2021) 14 (2022)
- % Export variation (1): -8.66 (2020) 17.48 (2021) 11.75 (2022)

== Cooperation ==
As a member of the OECD, the Slovak Republic is no longer considered as a beneficiary country of aid to become a donor country.

== List of declarations, treaties and agreements ==
- Agreement between Spain and the Socialist Republic of Czechoslovakia to avoid double taxation and prevent tax evasion in the matter of income and property taxes, signed in Madrid on 8 May 1980. Instrument of ratification of 12 March 1981 (BOE number 167 of 14 July 1981)
- Agreement of Economic and Industrial Cooperation between the Government of Spain and the Government of the Socialist Republic of Czechoslovakia signed in Prague on 21 March 1986. (published provisional application in BOE No. 105 of 2 May 1986 and its entry into vigor in BOE No. 16 of 19 January 1987)
- Agreement on legal assistance, recognition and enforcement of judgments in civil matters between the Kingdom of Spain and the Socialist Republic of Czechoslovakia, signed on 11 October 1988 and in force on 10 December 1988 (BOE No. 290 of 3 / 12/1988).
- Agreement for the protection and promotion of investments between the Kingdom of Spain and the Czech and Slovak Federative Republic signed in Madrid on 12 December 1990. Entered into force on 28 November 1991 (Official Gazette 33 of 7 February 1992)
- Treaty of friendly relations and cooperation between the Kingdom of Spain and the Czech and Slovak Federal Republic, made in Prague on 11 November 1989. Instrument of ratification of 27 October 1992. Entry into force on 10 December 1992 . (BOE No. 290 of 3 December 1992).*Convenio entre el Gobierno del Reino de España y el Gobierno de la República Eslovaca sobre la cooperación en materia de la lucha contra la delincuencia organizada, hecho “ad referéndum” en Bratislava el 3 de marzo de 1999, cuya aplicación provisional fue publicada en el BOE n. 192, de fecha 12 July 1999 y su entrada en vigor en el BOE n. 21 de 25 January 2000)
- Agreement for the readmission of persons in an irregular situation, done in Bratislava on 3 March 1999, provisional application published in the BOE n. 94, of 20 April 1999.
- Agreement of cultural and educational cooperation between the Kingdom of Spain and the Slovak Republic, made in Bratislava on 11 April 2000 (BOE No. 35 of 9 February 2001). It is in the process of renewal for the year 2013.
- Agreement between the Kingdom of Spain and the Slovak Republic on the International Carriage of Passengers and Goods by Road, made in Bratislava on 27 November 2001 (BOE No. 158 of 3 July 2002).
- Scientific and technical cooperation agreement between the Kingdom of Spain and the Slovak Republic, made in Bratislava on 7 May 2002 (Official Gazette No. 39 of 14 February 2003).
- Social Security Agreement between the Kingdom of Spain and the Slovak Republic, made in Bratislava on 22 May 2002. (BOE No. 156 of 1 July 2003)
- Agreement on creation and operation of bilingual sections in high schools of the Slovak Republic, signed in Bratislava on 29 March 2007
- Agreement between the Kingdom of Spain and the Slovak Republic for the mutual protection of Classified Information, signed in Bratislava on 20 January 2009.

== Resident diplomatic missions ==
- Slovakia has an embassy in Madrid.
- Spain has an embassy in Bratislava.
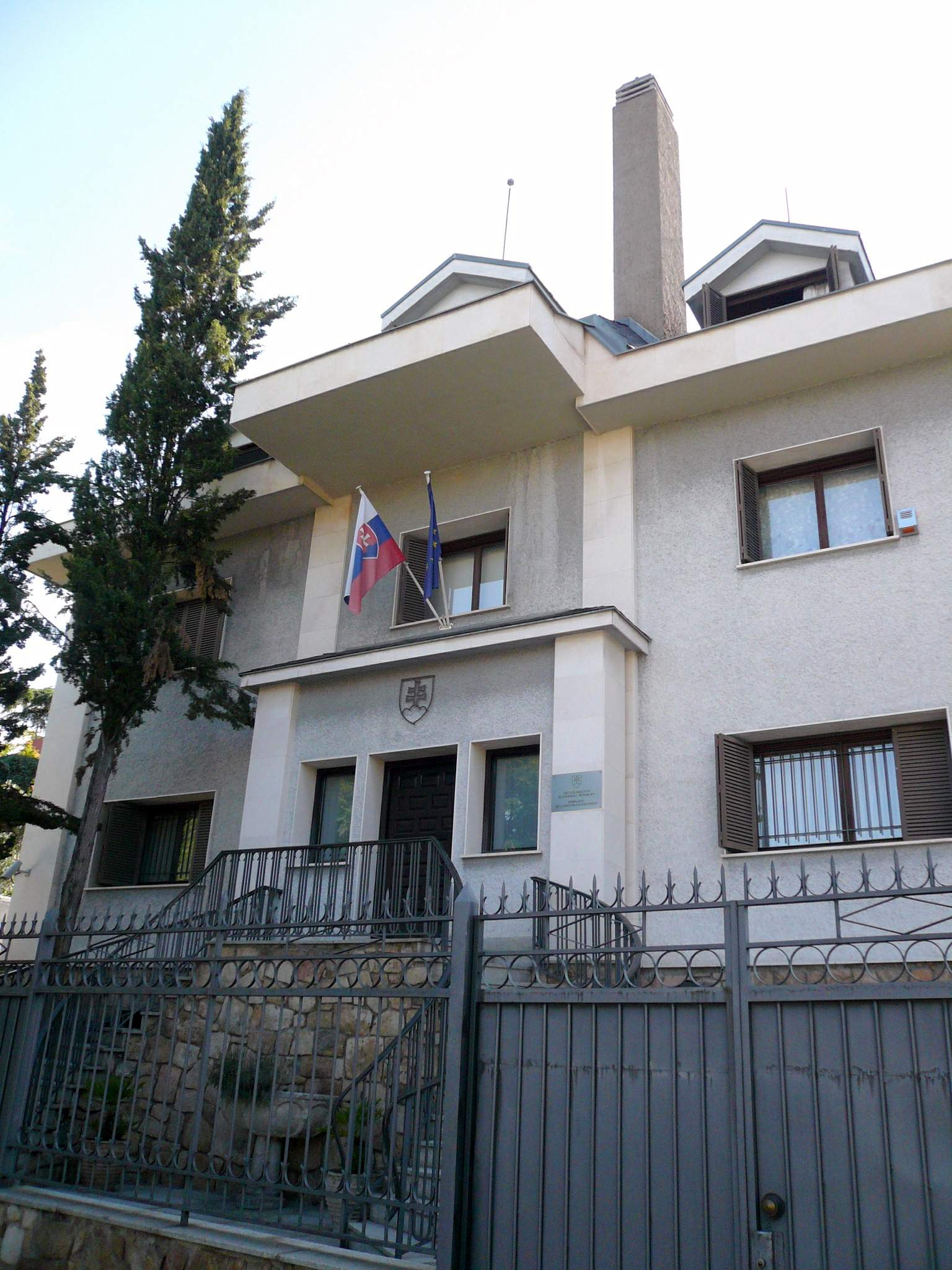
Embassy of Slovakia in Madrid

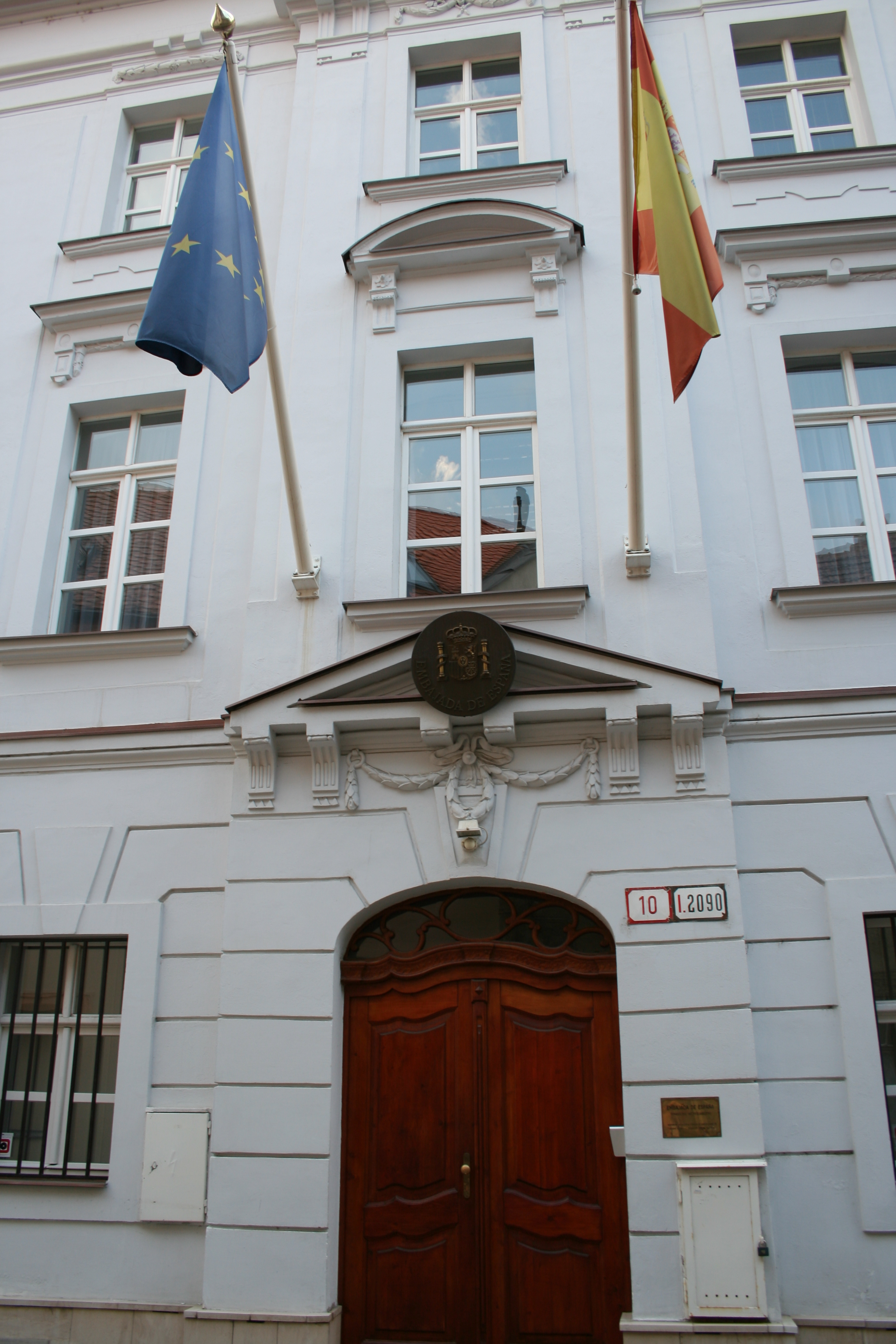
Embassy of Spain in Bratislava

== See also ==
- Foreign relations of Slovakia
- Foreign relations of Spain
