= Israel–Slovakia relations =

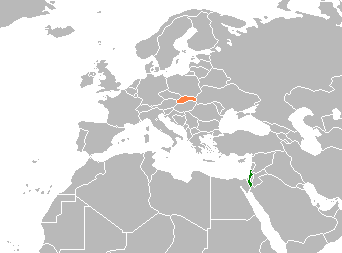
- Israel: Slovakia

Israel–Slovakia relations are bilateral relations of Israel and Slovakia.

Israel and Slovakia established relations on the first of January 1993. Israel has an embassy in Bratislava and Slovakia has an embassy in Tel Aviv.

== History ==
After the Dissolution of Czechoslovakia, Israel recognized both Czechia and Slovakia. Israel and Slovakia established relations on the first of January 1993. The first official visits were made by the representatives of the parliaments, with a visit of the Knesset Speaker made in August 1994, and a visit of the Chairman of the National Council of the Slovak Republic made in July 1995. The first official visit of the Slovak prime minister was after the Assassination of Yitzhak Rabin, with the Slovak prime minister Vladimír Mečiar attending the funeral of Yitzhak Rabin on 6 November 1995. On 14 May 1997, Israel and Slovakia signed an agreement on the abolition of the visa requirement, which entered into force on 2 September 1997.

On 8 August 1999, Israel and Slovakia signed an agreement on avidness of double taxation, which entered into force on 31 December 2000, and agreement on promotion and protection of investments, which entered into force on 23 June 2003. In February 2000, the President of the Slovak Republic Rudolf Schuster made an official visit to Israel, and in July 2003 the President of Israel Moshe Katsav made an official visit to Slovakia. Rudolf Schuster made a second visit to Israel in September 2003 as part of a working visit. In November 2003, the Prime Minister of Slovakia Mikuláš Dzurinda made an official visit to Israel.

In 2013, Israel and Slovakia signed an agreement on cooperation in industrial research and development. In 2018, the head of the Slovak National Council Andrej Danko told the Israeli President Reuven Rivlin that Slovakia will move its embassy to Jerusalem. On the first of September 2021, Slovakia established the Slovak Institute in Jerusalem with the main objective of deepening Slovak-Israeli cultural dialogue. In 2023, the President of Israel Isaac Herzog made a state visit to Slovakia.

== Trade ==
The trade between Israel and Slovakia is influenced by the 1995 EU-Israel Free Trade Agreement.

Israel - Slovakia trade in millions USD-$
	Israel imports Slovakia exports	Slovakia imports Israel exports	Total trade value
2023	203.4	20.1	223.5
2022	174.7	21.5	196.2
2021	242.6	22.9	265.5
2020	132.5	17.8	150.3
2019	186	17.7	203.7
2018	187.3	23.8	211.1
2017	245.8	17.9	263.7
2016	152.8	15.9	168.7
2015	262.9	27.9	290.8
2014	207.4	20.4	227.8
2013	111.5	17.1	128.6
2012	73.5	22.1	95.6
2011	94.4	27.4	121.8
2010	82.4	19.1	101.5
2009	60.9	23.4	84.3
2008	49.4	28.5	77.9
2007	17.2	18.5	35.7
2006	21.4	12.1	33.5
2005	23.5	11.9	35.4
2004	10.7	10.7	21.4
2003	14	10.2	24.2
2002	8.6	7.9	16.5

The Israeli military industry is also favorable by the Slovakian military as many deals were signed over the years. In March 2020 Slovakia ordered the Israeli Spike LR II an anti-tank missile system, in 2021 Israel delivered 17 ELTA radars to Slovakia, and in 2024 Slovakia ordered from Israel the air defense system BARAK MX.

== Tourism ==
From 1997 Israeli and Slovakia abolished the need for visas for each other's citizens to travel.

Slovakia is considered a safe destination of Israelis, and the Slovak tourism ministry advertising Slovakia's nature to the Israeli tourist with goal to increase tourists from Israel in 2025.

Tourism: Slovaks in Israel and Israelis in Slovakia (in thousands)
	2023	2022	2021	2020	2019	2018	2017
Tourists from Slovakia Arriving to Israel	17.5	8.6	0.7	4.7	22.7	20.1	14.4
Tourists from Israel Arriving to Slovakia	23.2	17.4	7.4	2.1	34.0	36.6	44.9

== Resident diplomatic missions ==
- Israel has an embassy in Bratislava.
- Slovakia has an embassy in Tel Aviv.

== See also ==
- Foreign relations of Israel
- Foreign relations of Slovakia
- History of the Jews in Slovakia
- History of the Jews in Bratislava
- The Holocaust in Slovakia
