= Slovakia's reaction to the 2008 Kosovo declaration of independence =

Kosovo's declaration of independence from Serbia was enacted on Sunday, 17 February 2008 by a unanimous vote of the Assembly of Kosovo. All 11 representatives of the Serb minority boycotted the proceedings. International reaction was mixed, and the international community continues to be divided on the issue of the international recognition of Kosovo. Slovakia's reaction to the 2008 Kosovo declaration of independence is one of non-recognition, but it has given indications that its stance could change in the future.

== Reaction ==
On the day of the declaration, the Slovak Ministry of Foreign Affairs issued this statement on its website: "Ministry of Foreign Affairs of the Slovak Republic takes note of the Kosovo unilateral declaration of independence. For the time being Slovakia does not consider recognising Kosovo on the basis of this declaration. Slovakia has always been in favour of the final settlement of the Kosovo status based upon an agreement with the decisive role of the UN Security Council in accordance with the UN-approved principles of the Contact Group. Slovakia will support all activities of the UN, European Union, NATO, OSCE and Council of Europe regarding Kosovo, primarily by the means of Slovak participation at NATO (KFOR) and the EU (EULEX) missions based on the UN Security Council Resolution 1244 (1999)".

Shortly afterwards, in February 2008, several high officials of Slovakia made statements regarding Kosovar independence. Prime Minister Robert Fico said "I do not exclude the possibility that Slovakia will never recognize Kosovo. Kosovo is not some independent territory, it is an integral part of Serbia where Serbs, and members of the Albanian ethnic minority live. The declaration of independence violate[s] the basic principles of international law". Fico also said that he wanted Kosovo to be debated at the UN, since it is the only organisation that can decide on the change of borders. Fico added "Historians compare what is happening today in Serbia with what happened at Munich in 1938 or with the Vienna arbitration". President Ivan Gašparovič said that Slovakia still had enough time to take a prudent stance. "I am sure that it will take not a year or two, but maybe even ten years, until countries can take a final position on Kosovo." Deputy Prime Minister Dušan Čaplovič said that by declaring independence without Serbian consent, Kosovo broke international law and created a precedent.

During 2009 there were several statements regarding Kosovo from Slovakia, most notable were made by President of Slovakia Ivan Gašparovič who said that "Slovakia prefers respect for international law, and therefore doesn't acknowledge independence for Kosovo." and by Foreign Minister Miroslav Lajčák who said that there is broad consensus across the Slovak Parliament, crossing party lines (with the exception of the Party of the Hungarian Coalition), that supports the government's stance on Kosovo recognition. Ján Škoda, the Spokesman of the Ministry of Foreign Affairs of Slovakia stated that Slovakia will wait until the ICJ produces its verdict before it takes the final decision towards Kosovo. In September 2009, Prime Minister of Slovakia Robert Fico explained that there was not a single reason for Slovakia to change its stance on Kosovo.

At a meeting in September 2009 with the Kosovan Foreign Minister, Skënder Hyseni, Mr. Lajčák said that Slovakia sees Kosovo as a sui generis case, and said "we are aware that the process is irreversible".

In a subsequent visit to Belgrade, Lajčák told the Serbian government that he would not support any initiative that put recognising Kosovo as a condition for Serbia to join the EU. Afterwards, Serbian president Boris Tadić thanked Slovakia for maintaining its support for Serbia's territorial integrity and sovereignty.

In a 3 December 2009 meeting with Serbian President Boris Tadić, Slovak President Ivan Gašparovič said that Slovakia would not recognise Kosovo even if the ICJ rules against Belgrade.

On 2 September 2010, Slovak Minister of Foreign Affairs Mikulas Dzurinda stated that he had never said Slovakia would never recognise Kosovo. On 5 January 2011, Dzurinda said that Slovakia would not change its position on the case.

In April 2012 Slovak Foreign Minister Miroslav Lajčák said that Slovakia's relationship with Kosovo will depend on developments in Kosovo and the development of dialogue between Belgrade and Pristina. Slovakia wants to normalise the atmosphere in the region, but this is not a prerequisite for Slovakia to reconsider its relationship with Kosovo.

In April 2012, at a Global Security Forum (Globsec) conference in Bratislava, Kosovo's Deputy Foreign Minister Petrit Selimi held a meeting with the Political Director of the Slovak Ministry of Foreign Affairs, Peter Michalko, who confirmed that Slovakia supports Kosovo's European perspective and encouraged Kosovar authorities to continue the cooperation with the EU as the fastest way of normalising relations in the Balkans. Also at the Globsec conference, in response to a question about Slovakia's position on Kosovo, Foreign Minister Miroslav Lajčák said, "Our position is given but it is not set in stone. It will certainly be adjusted when the situation on the ground is different".

On 8 August 2012, former Slovak Prime Minister Mikuláš Dzurinda, expressed his desire to improve relations between Kosovo and Slovakia.

After the 2013 Brussels Agreement, former Slovak Prime Minister Iveta Radičová said that she no longer saw any reason why Slovakia should not recognise Kosovo's independence.

After his election in 2014, President Andrej Kiska advocated for recognising Kosovo.

The Slovak Prime Minister Robert Fico, on April 2, 2015, stated that Slovakia "does not intend to recognize Kosovo."

On 7 October 2022, Slovak Prime Minister Eduard Heger met with President of Kosovo Vjosa Osmani in Prague, as part of the meetings undertaken during her participation at the European Political Community. During their meeting, they emphasized the need to jointly overcome the challenges and in committing to the strengthening of cooperation between their countries.

In April 2023, Slovakia along with Bosnia and Herzegovina, Greece, Moldova and Ukraine abstained in the vote to approve Kosovo's membership in the Council of Europe.

== See also ==
- International recognition of Kosovo
