= Mexico–Slovakia relations =

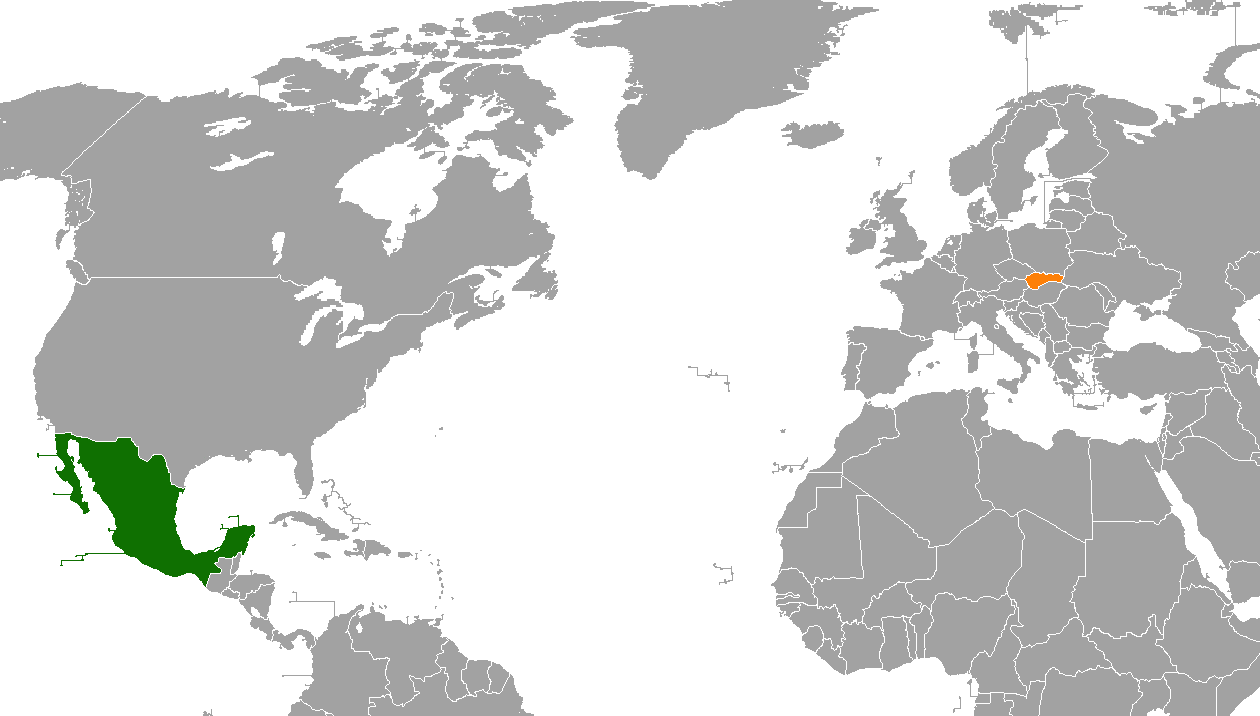

- Mexico: Slovakia

The nations of Mexico and Slovakia established diplomatic relations in 1993. Relations between both nations existed beginning in 1922 when Slovakia was part of Czechoslovakia until its separation from the union in 1992.

Both countries are members of the Organisation for Economic Co-operation and Development and the United Nations.

== History ==
Mexico established diplomatic relations with then Czechoslovakia in 1922; four years after the country proclaimed its independence from the Austro-Hungarian Empire. Diplomatic relations between the two nations were interrupted in April 1939 after the invasion from Germany in the country, however, the exiled Czechoslovak government in London maintained relations with Mexico. In 1942, diplomatic relations were fully restored between the two nations and in 1959, embassies were established in each other's capitals, respectively.

In December 1992, Czechoslovakia was split into Slovakia and the Czech Republic. Mexico established diplomatic relations with newly independent Slovakia on 1 January 1993. Initially, Mexico maintained diplomatic relations with Slovakia from its embassy in Prague, however, in 1996 Mexico accredited relations to Slovakia from its embassy in Vienna, Austria due to its close proximity to the Slovak capital of Bratislava. During this time, Slovakia opened a resident embassy in Mexico City.

In May 2006, Mexican President Vicente Fox paid an official visit to Slovakia and met with President Ivan Gašparovič. In February 2007, Mexican Foreign Secretary Patricia Espinosa paid a visit to Bratislava. In November 2017, Slovak President Andrej Kiska paid an official visit to Mexico.

In January 2024, both nations celebrated 31 years of diplomatic relations.

== High-level visits ==
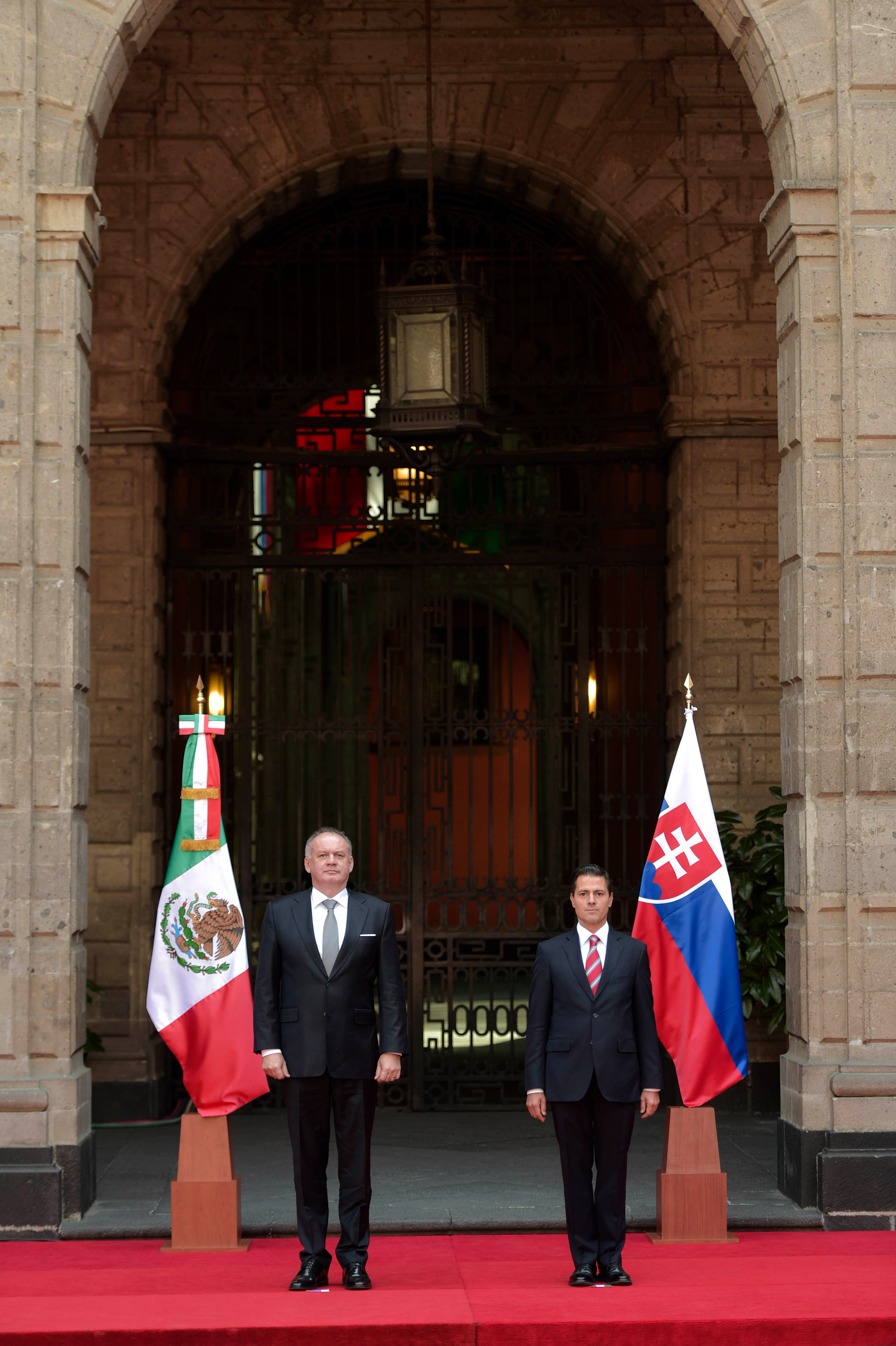
Slovak President Andrej Kiska on an official visit to Mexico, along with Mexican President Enrique Peña Nieto; November 2017.

High-level visits from Mexico to Slovakia

- Foreign Undersecretary for Europe Juan Rebolledo (2000)
- Foreign Undersecretary Lourdes Aranda (2004)
- President Vicente Fox (2006)
- Foreign Secretary Patricia Espinosa (2007)
- Foreign Undersecretary Carlos de Icaza (2016)

High-level visits from Slovakia to Mexico

- Secretary of State József Berényi (2003)
- Foreign Minister Eduard Kukan (2004)
- Foreign State Secretary Diana Štrofová (2007)
- Foreign State Secretary Oľga Algayerová (2010)
- Foreign Minister Miroslav Lajčák (2014)
- President Andrej Kiska (2017)

== Bilateral Agreements ==
Both nations have signed several bilateral agreements, such as an Agreement on Air Transportation (2000), Agreement on the Avoidance of Double Taxation and the Prevention of Tax Evasion (2006); Agreement on Economic Cooperation (2006), Agreement on Reciprocal Promotion and Protection of Investments (2007), Agreement on Cooperation in the fields of Education, Youth, Sports and Culture (2017) and an Agreement in Scientific, Technological, Academies and Innovation (2017).

== Trade ==
In 1997, Mexico signed a Free Trade Agreement with the European Union (which includes Slovakia since 2004). In 2023, trade between Mexico and Slovakia totaled US$540.8 million. Mexico's main exports to Slovakia include: auto-parts, machinery, electrical appliances and components, computer memory and copper based products. Slovakia's main exports to Mexico include: motors and compressors, auto-parts, tractors, electrical appliances and components, tools and tires. Mexican multinational company Nemak operates a plant in Žiar nad Hronom, Slovakia. Both nations are large Automotive industry producers.

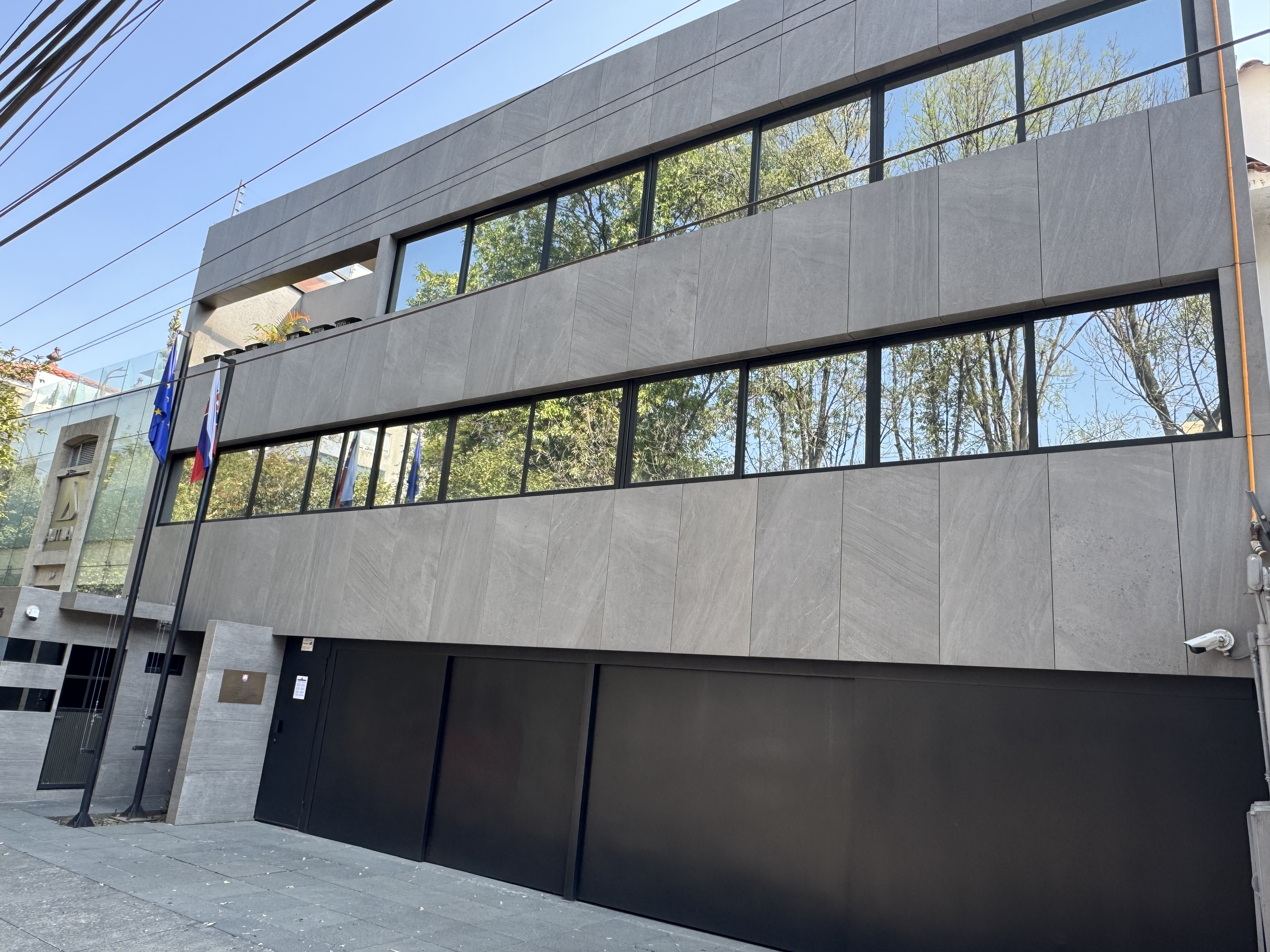
Embassy of Slovakia in Mexico City

== Resident diplomatic missions ==
- Mexico is accredited to Slovakia from its embassy in Vienna, Austria and maintains an honorary consulate in Bratislava.
- Slovakia has an embassy in Mexico City.
