= Czech Republic–Slovakia relations =

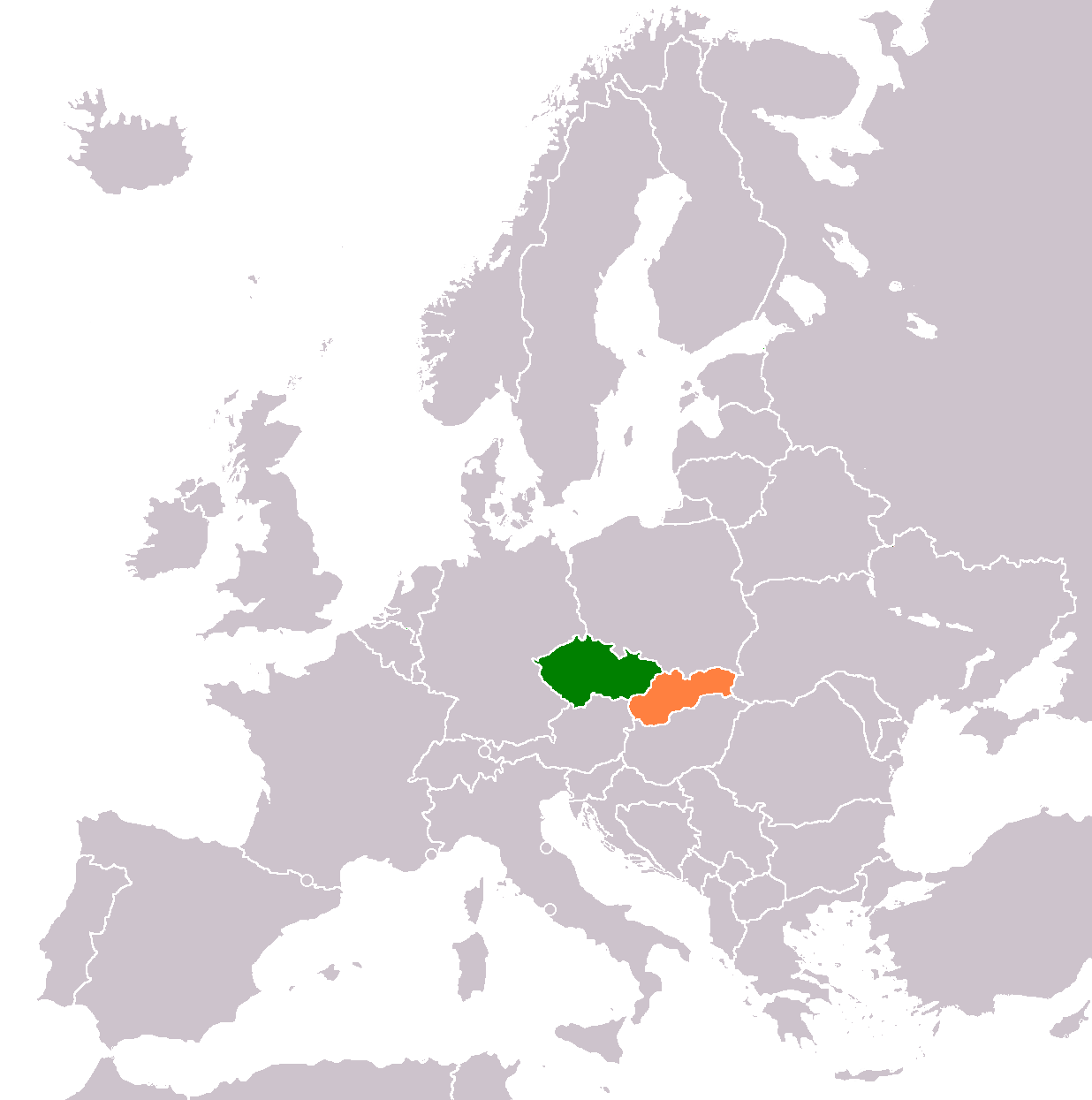
- Czech Republic: Slovakia

The Czech Republic and Slovakia established diplomatic relations on 1 January 1993. Before 1918, both countries were part of Austria-Hungary; however, after the Ausgleich of 1867 the Czech lands belonged to the Austrian Empire while Slovakia belonged to the administratively separate Kingdom of Hungary. Between 1918 and 1992, both countries were part of Czechoslovakia. The Czech Republic has an embassy in Bratislava. Slovakia has an embassy in Prague. Both countries are full members of the European Union and of NATO.

== History ==
=== Early relations ===
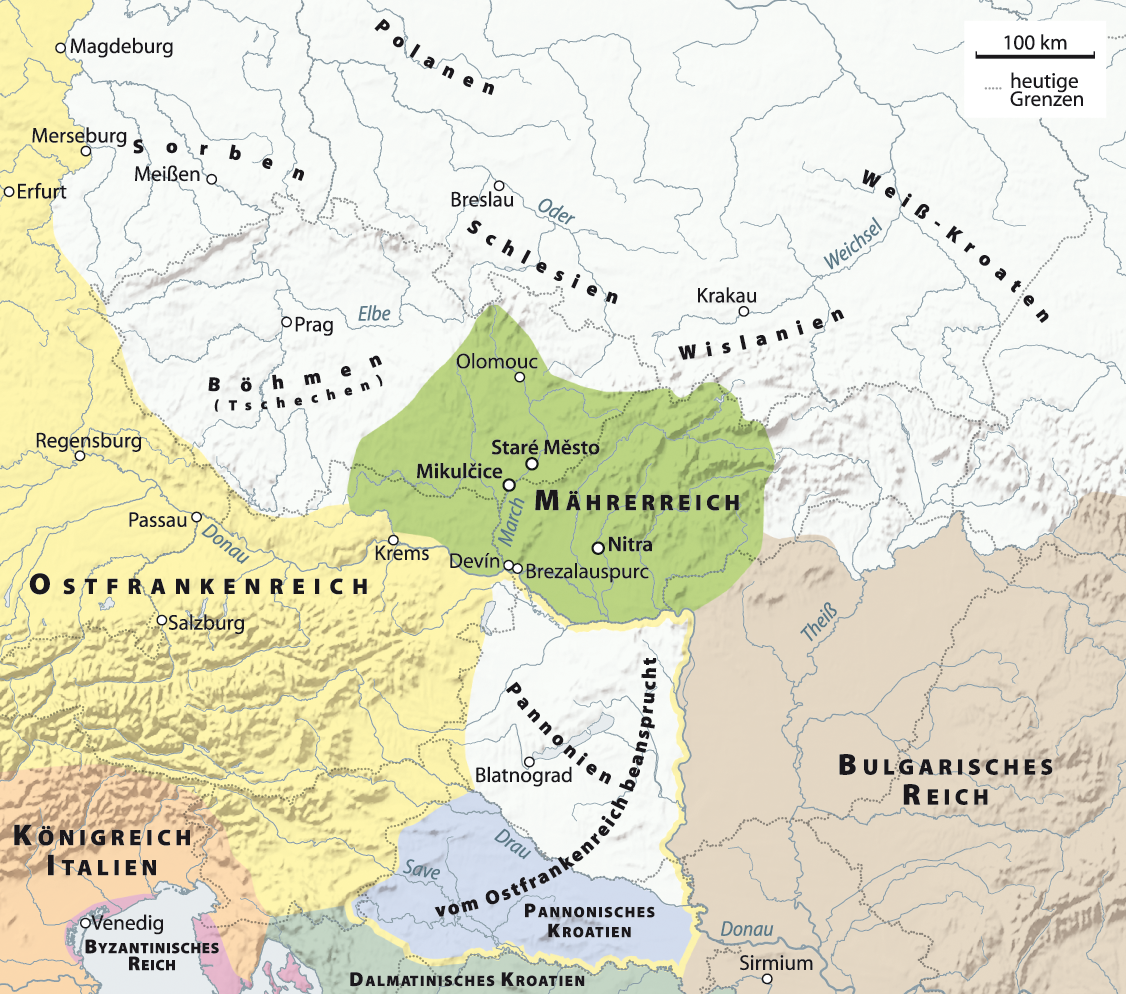
Early Moravian Empire under Mojmir I

The beginnings of relations between the Slovak and Czech peoples date back to the early Middle Ages. In 833, the Great Moravian Empire was established as the first joint state of the West Slavs in the territory of present-day Moravia and Western Slovakia. After the collapse of Great Moravia at the beginning of the 10th century, the historical paths of the two regions diverged for a long time: the territory of Slovakia became part of the Kingdom of Hungary, while the Czechs established their own Kingdom of Bohemia under various dynasties. In the centuries that followed, there were therefore only indirect contacts. However, both ethnic groups adopted Christianity (partly through the Slavic missionaries Cyril and Methodius in the 9th century) and developed closely related West Slavic languages, so that a sense of cultural kinship persisted. Until the 16th century, the Slovaks belonged to Hungary, while the lands of the Czechs remained independent or were under foreign rule (House of Luxembourg).

=== Habsburg period ===
Ethnicities of Austria-Hungary, 1910

After the Battle of Mohács in 1526, both the Kingdom of Bohemia (including Moravia) and the Kingdom of Hungary (including Slovakia) came under Habsburg rule. This meant that the Czechs and Slovaks were once again part of the same empire, albeit in different administrative units. The Bohemian lands belonged to the Habsburg monarchy, while Slovakia belonged to the lands of the Hungarian crown. In the 19th century, these different conditions led to divergent developments: the Czech regions experienced an industrial and cultural boom under relatively liberal Austrian administration, while the Slovaks were subjected to an intensive Magyarization policy after the Austro-Hungarian Compromise of 1867. Nevertheless, national movements arose among both peoples. Czech and Slovak intellectuals established contacts, and the idea of closer cooperation or even political union began to take shape. During the First World War, Czech and Slovak politicians in exile – led by Tomáš Garrigue Masaryk, Edvard Beneš and Milan Rastislav Štefánik – worked together to achieve independence from Austria-Hungary and the establishment of a joint state. Czech and Slovak volunteers fought in the Czechoslovak Legion to fight alongside the Entente. With the collapse of the Habsburg Monarchy in 1918, the plan for a separate nation became reality: on 28 October 1918, representatives of both nations proclaimed the Czechoslovak Republic, a joint state of the Czechs and Slovaks.

=== Czechoslovakia ===
Breakup of Czechoslovakia (1938/39)

The First Czechoslovak Republic (1918–1938) was a multinational state in which Czechs and Slovaks lived together with significant minorities (mainly Germans and Hungarians). Formally, a Czechoslovak nation was postulated in order to emphasize the unity of the country. Although the Slovak political representatives had been promised autonomy in the Pittsburgh Agreement of 1918, the constitution adopted in 1920 established a centralized unitary state without a separate Slovak government or parliament, on the grounds that the Slovak part of the country did not have enough political experience, skilled administrators and political institutions for a functioning autonomy. In the 1920s, Slovaks made up around 15% of the total population (with Czechs accounting for just under half). Many Slovaks perceived Prague's dominance as unequal treatment, which led to growing discontent and demands for autonomy by the Slovak People's Party in the 1930s. After the Munich Agreement in 1938, Slovakia initially gained extensive autonomy within the federalized “Second Republic.” In March 1939, Czechoslovakia finally collapsed as a result of German pressure. In Prague, the Protectorate of Bohemia and Moravia was established under German rule, while Slovakia proclaimed itself a nominally independent state on 14 March 1939, as the first Slovak nation state ever—albeit as a de facto satellite state of Nazi Germany.

After the Second World War, Czechoslovakia was restored in 1945 within its 1938 borders (without Carpatho-Ukraine). With the February coup by the communists in 1948, the state structure remained centralized. It was not until the Prague Spring of 1968 that a formal reorganization took place: on 1 January 1969, the ČSSR was transformed into a federation consisting of the Czech Socialist Republic and the Slovak Socialist Republic in order to accommodate Slovak aspirations for autonomy. In practice, however, decision-making powers remained firmly in the hands of the Communist Party of Czechoslovakia. During the “normalization” in the 1970s and 1980s, tensions between Czechs and Slovaks were publicly downplayed but persisted: There was discontent in Slovakia about limited influence on the government, while in the Czech Republic there was skepticism about the preferential economic treatment of Slovakia and the role of the Communist Party leader Gustáv Husák.

The peaceful Velvet Revolution, which took place in the context of the numerous revolutions of 1989 in the socialist states of Europe, brought democracy and economic liberalization. The Czech and Slovak Federative Republic was formed. At the same time, national issues resurfaced. In free elections in 1992, different political forces prevailed in the two parts of the country (in the Czech Republic, Václav Klaus with the Civic Forum/ODS, and in Slovakia, Vladimír Mečiar with the HZDS). The two sides were unable to reach a consensus on the form of government, with the Slovak side in particular pushing for autonomy. This dispute also included the Hyphen War. This was not a violent conflict, but rather a media-driven discourse about the “correct” name for the two-state federation. This dispute manifested the long-suppressed issues of Czech centralism and Slovak aspirations for self-determination.

Finally, the political leaders agreed to divide the state. Without a referendum and on the basis of parliamentary decisions, Czechoslovakia dissolved in 1993, peacefully splitting Czechoslovakia into the states of Czech Republic and Slovakia, often referred to as the “Velvet Divorce” because the process was peaceful and amicable. This separation, which was decided mainly by the political elite without a referendum, was not without controversy, as opinion polls in both parts of the country showed that there was no majority in favor of dissolving Czechoslovakia. In a September 1992 poll, only 37% of Slovaks and 36% of Czechs were in favor of separation.

Relations after 1993

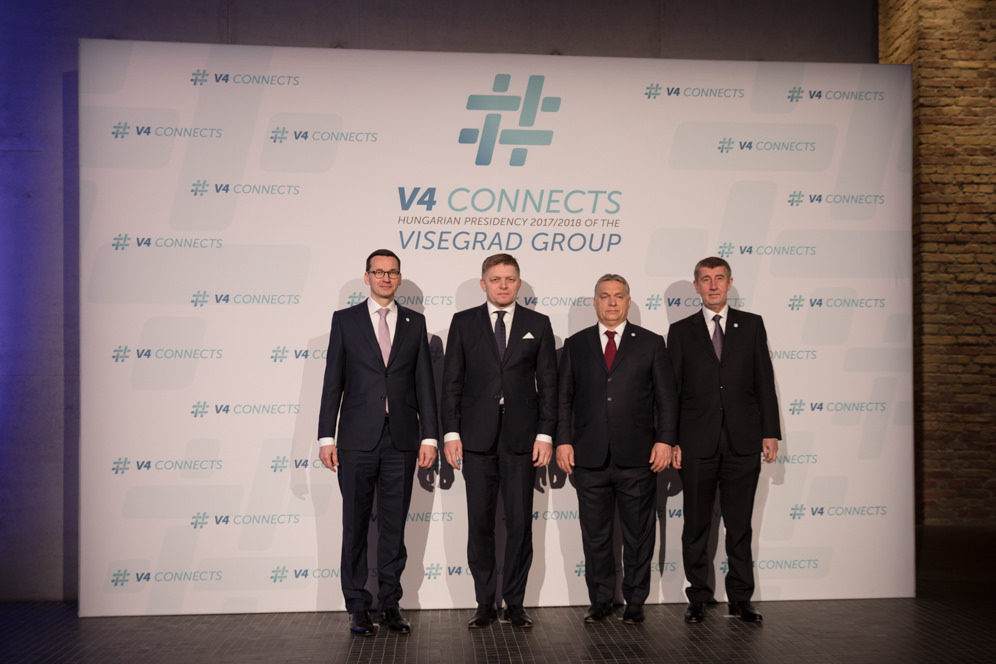
2018 meeting of the Visegrád Group with Mateusz Morawiecki (Poland), Robert Fico (Slovakia), Viktor Orbán (Hungary) and Andrej Babiš (Czech Republic)

After the split, Slovakia and the Czech Republic continued their relations in an exceptionally friendly manner (in contrast to, for example, Yugoslavia). Diplomatic relations were established on 1 January 1993, with both countries opening embassies in Prague and Bratislava. To avoid economic disadvantages, they signed a customs union agreement in 1992, which came into force on Independence Day. This allowed the free movement of goods between the two countries and prevented the introduction of customs barriers. The customs union and other bilateral agreements ensured a smooth transition after the end of the federation. It was not until both countries joined the EU in May 2004 – together with their Central European neighbors – that the Czech-Slovak customs union was absorbed into the EU customs union. Prague and Bratislava also continued to cooperate closely on a political level, for example in the regional Visegrád Group. Mutual relations were often described as “brotherly” in politics and the media. Newly elected presidents of the Czech Republic and Slovakia traditionally make their first foreign visit to the other country and hold joint cabinet meetings once a year to discuss important bilateral issues. Opinion polls regularly show that Czechs and Slovaks view each other with great goodwill – the neighboring country is often named the “most popular country.”

Nevertheless, relations also faced challenges. In the 1990s, Slovakia was temporarily isolated internationally under Prime Minister Mečiar, while the Czech Republic integrated more quickly into Western institutions. This changed in 1998 at the latest, and Slovakia caught up (joining NATO in 2004 and the EU in 2004). More recently, political differences have come to light, especially after the return of Slovak Prime Minister Robert Fico at the end of 2023. Fico's foreign policy course – such as his government's sceptical stance toward further military aid for Ukraine – led to tensions with the pro-Western government in Prague. In March 2024, Czech Prime Minister Petr Fiala canceled a planned joint government meeting and announced that the previously “excellent” relations would be suspended for the time being. The reason was differences over relations with Russia. Observers spoke of a noticeable cooling after more than 30 years of exceptionally close partnership.

== Military relations ==
Both countries are full members of NATO. The Czech Republic joined NATO in 1999, and Slovakia joined NATO in 2004. In December 2016 Slovak government ratified the Treaty of Cooperation on Mutual Protection of Airspace, which allows the use of Czech and Slovak military aircraft in the airspace of the other one and the possible reinforcement of one air force by its neighbour's counterpart in time of need. After the ratification from the Czech side, it came into effect in July 2017.

== Trade ==
In 2023, bilateral trade between the Czech Republic and Slovakia reached approximately $26.9 billion, with Czechia exporting $15.8 billion worth of goods to Slovakia and importing $11.1 billion from Slovakia. The trade volume has moderately grown over the past five years.

The automotive sector remains the dominant industry in trade between the two nations. Czechia’s main exports to Slovakia in 2023 included motor vehicle parts and accessories ($2.02 billion), cars ($1.02 billion), and refined petroleum ($545 million). Conversely, Slovakia primarily exported motor vehicle parts and accessories ($1.02 billion), refined petroleum ($775 million), and cars ($501 million) to Czechia.

In 2019, Czechia exported $1.73 billion in services to Slovakia, with travel ($540 million) and business services ($394 million) accounting for the largests shares. Similarly, in 2020, Slovakia exported $1.28 billion in services to Czechia, led by travel ($406 million) and transportation ($405 million).

== Cultural relations ==
Cultural relations between Slovaks and Czechs are exceptionally close and friendly. This is mainly due to their linguistic and cultural proximity, which is almost unique in the world. The Czech and Slovak languages are so closely related that both peoples understand each other well in everyday life. Official documents in the other country's language are automatically recognized in the Czech Republic and Slovakia. Until their separation in 1993, they lived in a shared media and educational space, which promoted mutual language skills. Even after 1993, Czech remained omnipresent in Slovakia: most Slovak households can still receive Czech television and radio stations today. Czech films, series, and books are often shown or distributed in Slovakia in their original form, as subtitles or translations are not necessary. As a result, passive—but often also active—knowledge of Czech remains very high among the Slovak population. Conversely, after the separation, everyday contact with Slovak declined somewhat in the Czech Republic, so that language skills of Slovak are not quite as widespread there.

Cultural cooperation is promoted by government and civil society initiatives. There is a Czech Center in Bratislava that organizes exhibitions, film festivals, concerts, and readings. Slovakia is similarly active in the Czech cultural sphere. Numerous theater companies, musicians, and artists regularly perform in each other's countries. There are also many personal connections. Countless families have mixed roots, as marriages between Czechs and Slovaks were common during the period when the two countries were part of the same state. Education and the sciences are important areas. Thousands of Slovak students continue to be attracted to Czech universities every year. Due to the similarity of the languages, Slovaks can study there without any major obstacles—Czech universities accept Slovak applicants without complications, and exams can often even be taken in Slovak.

There are around 200,000 people of Slovak descent living in the Czech Republic and around 46,000 people of Czech descent living in Slovakia. Gustáv Slamečka, a Slovak citizen, was a Minister of Transportation of the Czech Republic from 2009 to 2010 and in his office he exclusively used the Slovak language. In addition, Andrej Babiš, who served as prime minister of the Czech Republic from 2017 to 2021, was born in Bratislava, Czechoslovakia (now Slovakia) to a Slovak father. Babiš holds dual Czech and Slovak citizenship, and was the first Czech prime minister for whom Czech was not a native language.

== European Union and NATO ==
Both countries became members of the EU in 2004. the Czech Republic joined NATO in 1999, and Slovakia joined NATO in 2004.

== Resident diplomatic missions ==
- The Czech Republic has an embassy in Bratislava.
- Slovakia has an embassy in Prague.
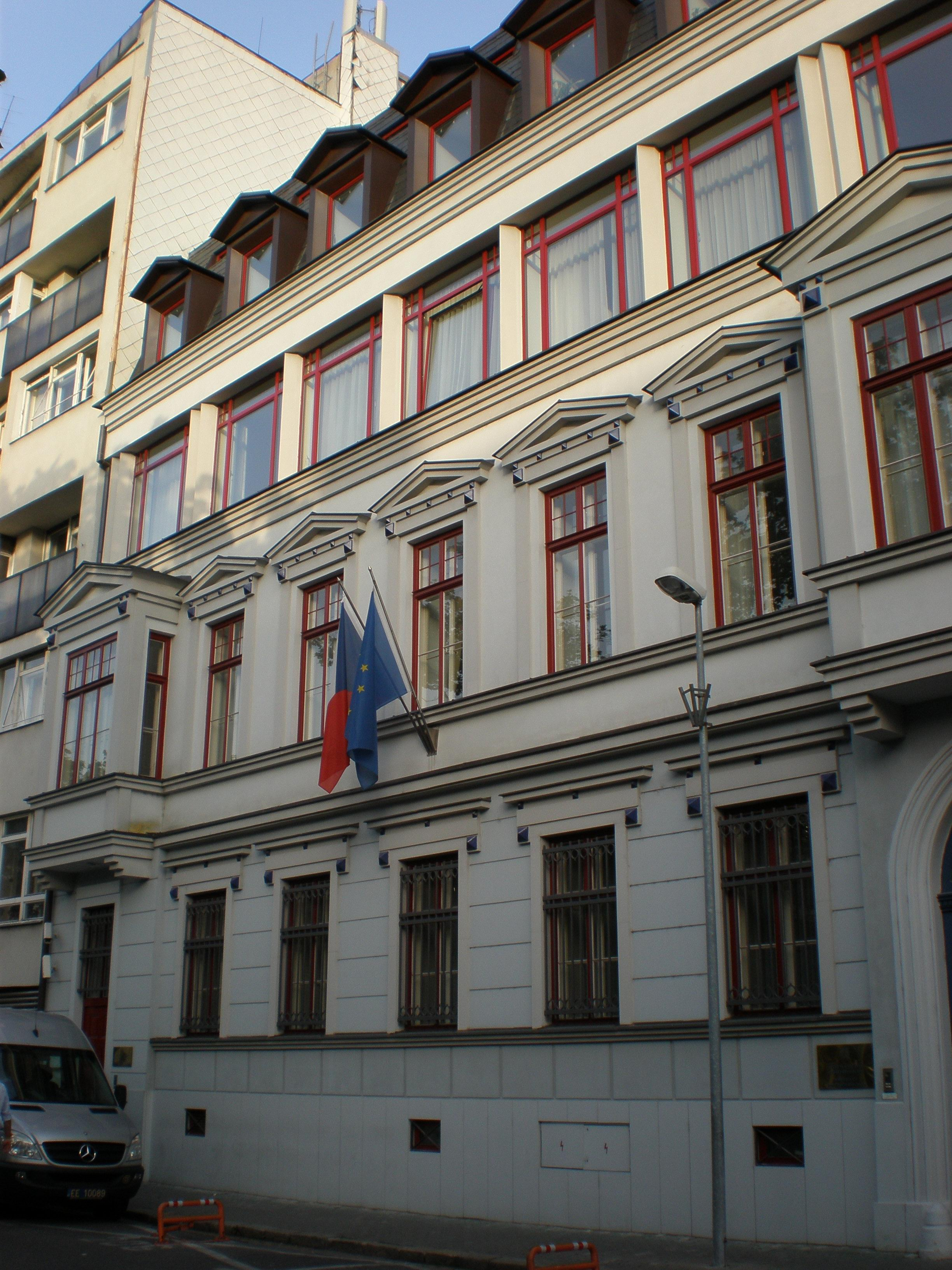
Embassy of the Czech Republic in Bratislava

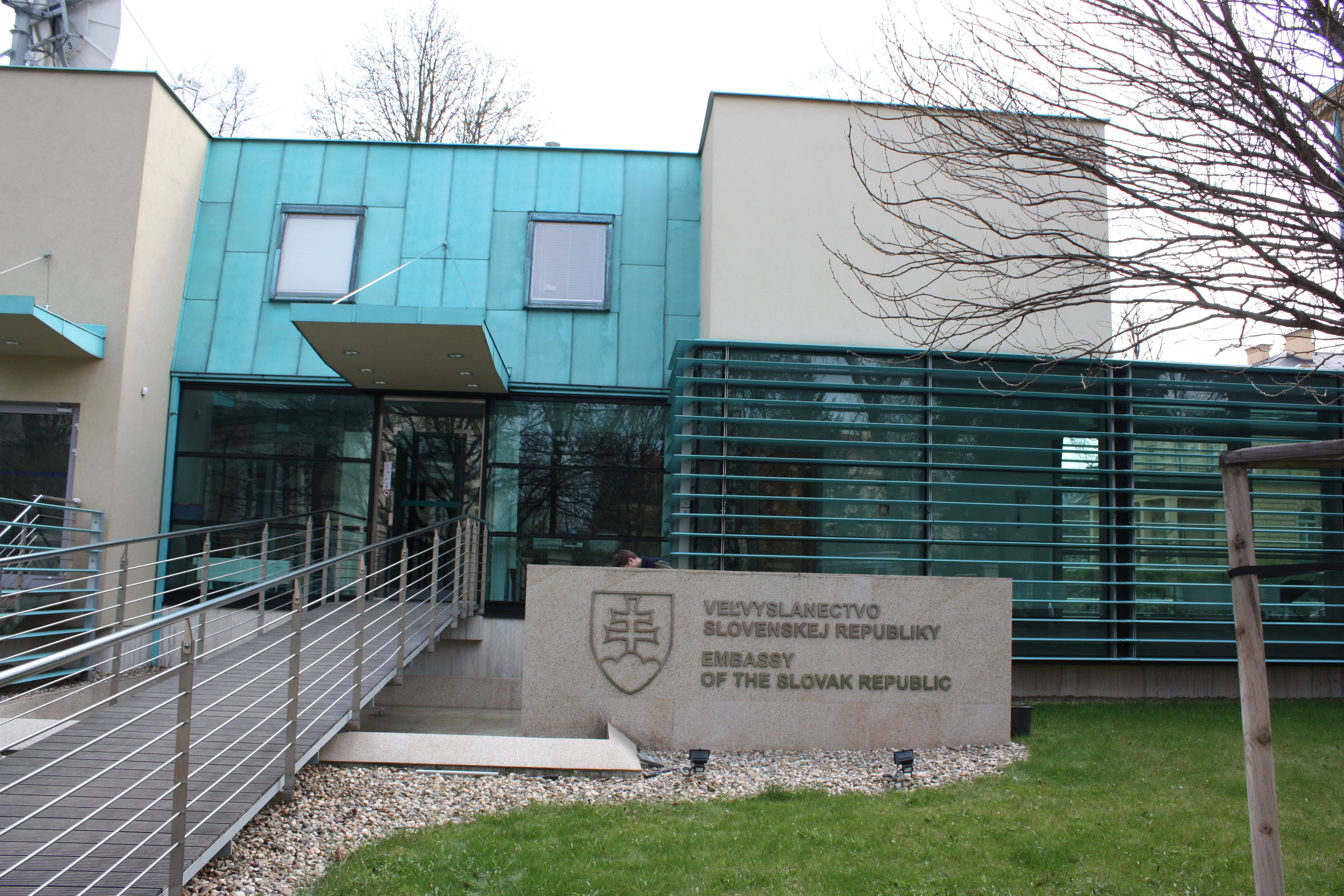
Embassy of Slovakia in Prague

== See also ==
- Dissolution of Czechoslovakia
- 2004 enlargement of the European Union
- Slovaks in the Czech Republic
- Czechs in Slovakia
