= Shaven women =

Derogatory WW II term for women who had a relationship with a German soldier

Shaven women were women humiliated for wartime collaboration during or after a war by having their hair shaved off from the 1920s onwards.

== Precedents ==
Shaving off women's hair was an ancient punishment in many cultures - examples occur in the Bible, in ancient Germany, among the Visigoths, in a Carolingian capitulary dating to 805 and against adulterous women in the Middle Ages. After the Tour de Nesle affair, Philip IV's three daughters in law were convicted of adultery and had their heads shaved.

In the 11 July 1682 ordinance against the Roma entitled "Declaration against vagabonds and people called Bohenmians and those who give them shelter", Jean-Baptiste Colbert condemned - even without a crime - men to the galleys in perpetuity and women to have their heads shaved. This was to prevent the men being easily recruited as troops for nobles revolting against royal authority. Women who returned to this life after being shaved were whipped and banished from France.

Whatever the context, the punishment always had a marked sexual connotation and aimed to shame the victim, and again make her the property of the national community by purifying her and inflicting a public 'mark' on her. Shaving was felt to be all the more punitive in an era when appearance held more importance; symbolically it was equally used when the shaven woman was held to have sinned through her powers of seduction and remained visible for several months.

== 1918-1943 ==
=== France and Belgium ===
At the end of the First World War the French soldier Ephraïm Grenadou mentioned suspected female collaborators in the departments of the Nord in his memoirs:

When we arrived in that area, they were settling their accounts for old quarrels during the German occupation. They cut good women's hair.

This is the only evidence of such a punishment there and remains subject to confirmation. though it is reliably attested to in Belgium in the same period.

=== Germany ===
The first such public shavings were in the Weimar Republic in the early 1920s. Part of Germany was occupied by the French and Belgian armies and relations began between them and German women. Several local women were shaved as punishment, with the practice continuing into the 1930s. Posters were also sometimes put up identifying women who had had relations with the enemy.

When the Nazis seized power in Germany their concern with "pure-race Germans" marrying "foreigners" and thus defiling the Aryan race led to the Nuremberg Laws on 15 September 1935 "for the protection of German blood and German honour". These forbade marriage between Jews and "nationals of German or related blood" and even between "good Germans" and Black people or Gypsies. Violation of these laws was punishable by prison and/or the woman involved having their heads shaved, or even death.

A Nazi ordnance of 30 January 1940 forbade sexual relations between Aryan women and non-Aryans and made head-shaving a means of repression, but a circular of 13 October 1941 by Martin Bormann forbade that public punishment, fearing its negative reception in Allied nations and friendly countries which sent workers to Germany and aiming to avoid giving foreigners the impression of pillorying misbehaving Germans. It also forbade slandering them in the press, putting them in a literal pillory or parading them through the streets.

=== Spain ===
The practice was resumed (or reinvented) by the Spanish falangists from the beginning of the Spanish Civil War (1936-1939). A similar custom existed in the 17th century, involving the shaving of women's heads upon entering prison (considered, whatever the reason for their conviction, as fallen women), thus signifying a break with their past and the beginning of a new life.

From the outset of the Spanish coup of July 1936, in Spanish Morocco, Republican women and female relatives of Republicans (wives, mothers, sisters, and daughters) had their heads shaved. This act of deliberate and premeditated terror was committed across conquered Spain, in order to keep the home front calm. It was an act exclusively committed by the nationalists, in a ritualized and consistent manner throughout the war, as a form of purification.

== French liberation ==
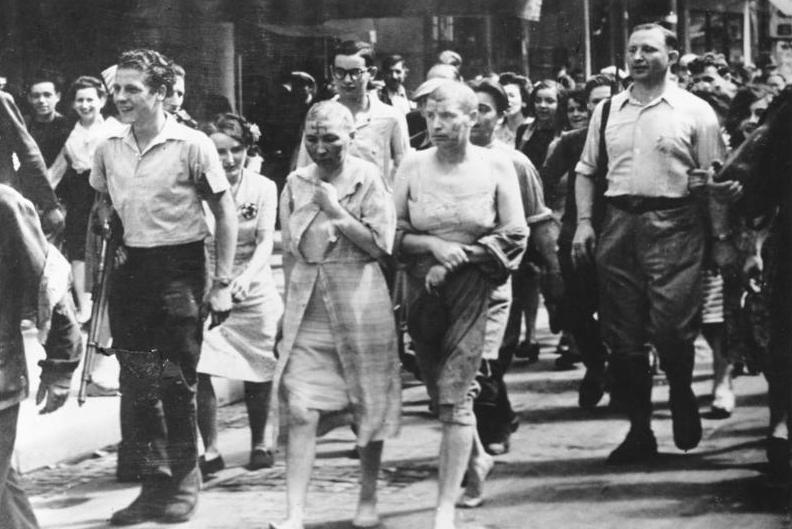
French women accused of collaboration after the post-liberation 'épuration sauvage', Paris, summer 1944.

The punishment is best known in western Europe at the end of the Second World War between the liberation of France and the war's end.

== After 1945 ==
It has also been used in 2004 by Hindu fundamentalists against Indian converts to Christianity.

== Bibliography (in French) ==
- Frédéric Baillette, « Organisations pileuses et positions politiques », Quasimodo, Montpellier, no 77 (Modifications corporelles), spring 2003, p. 121-160
- Sophie Bernard (1988). Le Discours sur les « tondues » (master's thesis). université d'Aix-en-Provence..
- Alain Brossat (1992). Les Tondues, un carnaval moche. Paris: Manya..
- Patrick Buisson (2009). 1940-1945. Années érotiques (in French). Vol. De la grande prostituée à la revanche des mâles. Paris: Albin Michel. ISBN 978-2-226-18688-1..
- Cahiers de l'IHTP, No. 31 (Identités féminines et violences politiques (1936-1946)), October 1995
- Jean-Paul Cointet (2008). Expier Vichy: L'Épuration en France 1943-1958 (in French). Paris: Perrin. ISBN 978-2-262-02200-6..
- Catherine Durand (2006). "La guerre en mémoire". Femmes tondues - la diabolisation de la femme en 1944. By Dominique François. Le Coudray-Macouard : Cheminements.
- Philippe Frétigné; Gérard Leray (2011). La Tondue 1944-1947. Enquêtes (in French). Paris: Vendémiaire. ISBN 978-2-36358-011-5..
- Max Lagarrigue :
  - « Épuration, attentats, affabulation : le Tarn-et-Garonne à la Libération », Arkheia, Montauban, nos 5-6, 2002;
  - « Trois questions sur... l’Épuration : sauvage ou légale », Arkheia, nos 14-15-16, 2005;
  - « Épuration sauvage, légale : vengeance ou soif de justice de la Résistance », Arkheia, nos 17-18, 2006 - published in Max Lagarrigue, La France sous l'Occupation, éd. CRDP Languedoc-Roussillon, coll. « 99 questions sur... », Montpellier, 2007, 222 p. (ISBN 2866262808 and 978-2-86626-280-8).
- Jean-Yves Le Naour, « Femmes tondues et répression des femmes à Boches en 1918 », Revue d'Histoire moderne et contemporaine, January-March 2000, p. 148-158.
- Françoise Leclerc and Michèle Weindling, « La répression des femmes coupables d'avoir collaboré pendant l'Occupation », Clio. Femmes, genre, histoire, nos 1-1995 (Résistances et Libérations France 1940-1945), January 1995
- Lucia Reggiani (1988). Les Tondues. Cortèges de barbarie à la libération (1944). Paris..
- Valentine Schulmeister (2014). J'ai failli être tondue (in French). Sancerre: éd. Double fureur. ISBN 978-2-912704-12-2.. With the Evane Luna's poem Août 44 as a preface.
- Jacky Tronel, « L’Épuration et les femmes en Dordogne (1944-1951) », Arkheia, Montauban, nos 17-18, 2006
- Fabrice Virgili :
  - « Les « tondues » à la Libération : le corps des femmes, enjeu d'une réaproppriation », Clio, nos 1-1995 (Résistances et Libérations France 1940-1945), January 1995;
  - « Les tontes de la Libération en France », in François Rouquet and Danièle Voldman (ed.s), Identités féminines et violences politiques (1936-1946), Institut d'histoire du temps présent, coll. « Cahiers de l'IHTP » (no 31), October 1995.
  - La France « virile » : des femmes tondues à la Libération, Paris, Payot et Rivages, 2000, 392 p. (ISBN 2-228-89346-3 and 978-2228893466 — new edition : Payot et Rivages, coll. « Petite bibliothèque », 2004, 422 p. (ISBN 2-228-89857-0 and 978-2228898577) ;
  - Naître ennemi – Les enfants de couples franco-allemands nés pendant la Seconde Guerre mondiale, Paris, Payot et Rivages, 2009, 376 p. (ISBN 978-2-228-90399-8 and 2-228-90399-X).

== In fiction ==
=== Novels ===
- Guy Croussy, La tondue, Grasset, 1980.
- Marie de Palet, La Tondue, Éditions De Borée, 2002.
- Philippe Cougrand, Garonne amère, Pleine Page Éditeur, coll. « Rouge nuit », Bordeaux, 2006, 312 p. ISBN 2-913406-40-8, 978-2913406407.
- Valentine Goby, L'Échappée, Gallimard, 2007.
- Carlota O’Neill, Una Mujer en la guerra de España, 1979.
- Joël Selo, Les vieux démons, éditions De Borée, 2007, 331 p. ISBN 2844944876, 978-2844944870.
- Francis Berthelot, L'Ombre du soldat, Denoël, 1994, 175 p. ISBN 2207241483, 978-2207241486.

=== Films ===
- Manon, directed by Henri-Georges Clouzot (1949)
- Hiroshima mon amour, directed by Alain Resnais (1958) ;
- Le Vieil homme et l'enfant, directed by Claude Berri (1966) ;
- Un enfant dans la foule, directed by Gérard Blain (1976) ;
- Les Chinois à Paris, directed by Jean Yanne (released 1974), dealing with a fictional Chinese woman recalling the German occupation of France
- Black Book, directed by Paul Verhoeven (2006)
- Along Came Love, directed by Katell Quillévéré (2021)

=== Music ===
- La Tondue, in Georges Brassens' 1964 album Les Copains d'abord
- Patrick Font's 2010 song Identité nationale, written in reaction to the creation of France's 'Ministry of Immigration, Integration, National Identity and Solidarity Development, humorously referred to the women shaved in France in 1944-1945 - the line "I even had my lawn mowed, when in July '92 a German went down on it" denounced what the artist saw as a shift to the far right.
- Benabar's 2003 song Je suis de celles linked male contempt for 'easy girls' who they nevertheless used and the fate of shaven women "in another era".

=== Other media ===
- Robert Capa's August 1944 photograph The Shaved Woman of Chartres
- Paul Éluard's 1944 poem on shaven women, 'Comprenne qui voudra' was published in the review Au rendez-vous des Allemands, Éditions de Minuit, Paris, 1944.

== Documentaries ==
- Jean-Pierre Carlon, Tondues en 44, documentary, 2007, 52 minutes, France Télévisions
- Jean-Louis Lorenzi, Épuration, Film TV, 2007, 100 minutes, France Télévisions
