= Yannakakis =

Yannakakis is a family name of Greek origin. It may refer to one of the following persons.

- Mihalis Yannakakis (born 1953), Greek computer scientist
- Georgios N. Yannakakis, Greek computer scientist working in Denmark
- Ilios Yannakakis (1931–2017), French-Greek historian and politologist
