= Cercle de l'Oratoire =

French think-tank

The Cercle de l'Oratoire (French for "Circle of the Oratory") is a French think tank created a short time after the September 11, 2001 attacks. Since 2006, it edits a journal, Le Meilleur des mondes. The Circle is led by the journalist Michel Taubmann, who is also in charge of the news at Arte-Paris, and his wife Florence, a pastor at the Temple de l'oratoire du Louvre and vice-president of the Amitié judéo-chrétienne group (Judeo-Christian Friendship). Many of its members (André Glucksmann, Pascal Bruckner, Romain Goupil, etc.) and the Meilleur des mondes journal supported the US invasion of Iraq, a minority viewpoint in France.

== Le Meilleur des mondes ==
The journal Le Meilleur des mondes is published by Éditions Denoël and headed by Michel Taubmann. It launched a first petition in favor of the United Nations' intervention in Afghanistan. Two years later, it published another petition in Le Figaro supporting the US invasion of Iraq.

This journal has been described by some in the French media as the "Voice of America" or as a gathering point of French neoconservatives (néo-conservateurs à la française). The journal, however, rejects these labels, describing itself as "anti-totalitarian". It considers radical Islam as a "real danger", and claims that "there has never been so much anti-Jewish propaganda."

== Composition ==
- Several intellectuals such as André Glucksmann and Pascal Bruckner
- Filmmakers such as Romain Goupil, Jacques Tarnero and Raphaël Glucksmann
- Historians such as Stéphane Courtois, Max Lagarrigue and Ilios Yannakakis.
- Mohammed Abdi, secretary general of the NGO Ni Putes Ni Soumises
- Jacky Mamou, former President of Médecins du Monde (Doctors of the World),
- Pierre-André Taguieff, research director at the CNRS
- Thérèse Delpech, director of strategic affairs at the Commissariat à l'énergie atomique (CEA) and researcher at the CERI Institute
- Bruno Tertrais, former director of the civil affairs commission at the NATO Assembly and also a CERI researcher
- Frédéric Encel, a geopolitist specialist of the Middle East
- Antonio Elorza, a political sciences professor at the University of Madrid
- Writers Olivier Rolin and Marc Weitzmann
- Journalists Cécilia Gabizon, specialist of Islam issues at the Figaro newspaper, Elisabeth Schemla, founder of the website proche-orient.info, Antoine Vitkine, journalist at Arte TV, Jean-Luc Mouton, director of the Protestant weekly Réforme, Violaine de Marsangy, a freelance journalist and former responsible of logistics for the NGO Action contre la faim in North Korea and Indonesia, Claire Brière-Blanchet
- Lawyer Michel Laval.
