= Along Came Love (2023 film) =

- Theatrical release poster
- French: Le Temps d'aimer
- Directed by: Katell Quillévéré
- Screenplay by: Katell Quillévéré; Gilles Taurand
- Produced by: David Thion; Justin Taurand; Philippe Martin
- Starring: Anaïs Demoustier; Vincent Lacoste
- Cinematography: Tom Harari
- Edited by: Jean-Baptiste Morin
- Music by: Amin Bouhafa
- Production companies: Les Films du Bélier; Les Films Pelléas; Frakas Productions; Radio Télévision Belge Francophone (RTBF)
- Distributed by: Gaumont (France); Cinéart (Belgium)
- Release dates: 20 May 2023 (Cannes); 29 November 2023 (France)
- Running time: 125 minutes
- Countries: France; Belgium
- Languages: French; English
- Box office: $1,633,978

Along Came Love (French: Le Temps d'aimer) is a 2023 drama film co-written and directed by Katell Quillévéré, loosely based on the life of her own grandmother. Starring Anaïs Demoustier and Vincent Lacoste, it follows a French woman, who is branded a Nazi collaborator following an affair with a German soldier, adapting to life in post-war France.

The film had its world premiere in the Cannes Premiere section of the 2023 Cannes Film Festival on 20 May, where it was nominated for the Queer Palm. It was theatrically released in France on 29 November 2023 by Gaumont.

== Plot ==
After a brief liaison with a German soldier, working-class Madeleine is publicly shamed as a "collabo" whilst still pregnant with his child.

After the war, estranged from her family, Madeleine works as a waitress at the hôtel Beaurivage in Brittany, raising her young son Daniel alone. In 1947, she meets, falls in love with and quickly marries François, a postgraduate archaeology student at the Sorbonne and younger son of a wealthy industrialist who avoided the war due to a previous bout with polio. The three soon move to Paris. There, François' former male lover, Nicolas, noisily tries to gain entry to their flat, with François pretending that he was merely a college friend who was certified insane after an academic grievance. Madeleine, deeply suspicious, struggles to believe his story.

Madeleine receives news that her estranged father has died and returns home to visit his grave, where the family's car windscreen is defaced by excrement and Nazi symbolism by the locals who know of Madeleine's past scandal. Upon returning home, they discover that Nicolas burned down their apartment in their absence—and, with it, François's near-complete thesis. Though Madeleine feels her suspicions confirmed, she hopes to make a fresh start with François by moving to run a dance club near an American military base as he re-writes his thesis.

Madeleine and Daniel's relationship grows more and more difficult, as Madeleine resents her son for the difficult life she suffered after the war while Daniel resents his mother for lying to him about his biological father. Daniel is eventually expelled from school for attacking another pupil. Meanwhile, at the dance club, both François and Madeleine become attracted to a handsome and charismatic Black American serviceman, Jimmy. Jimmy spends more and more time with the couple, who eventually shelter him in their bedroom when an American military police squad checks leave passes, which he lacks. One night, Madeleine wakes Jimmy by massaging his groin with her foot. They begin making love and Madeleine invites François to join. François kisses both Madeleine and Jimmy, but when he takes his trousers off to have sex, Jimmy breaks things off and leaves, angry at François for assuming he is queer. Madeleine finally confronts François about his sexuality, during which François admits he will never love her like Nicolas or Jimmy but he can't be happy without her, and the two reconcile.

Over the next many years, François completes his thesis, Madeleine gives birth to Jeanne, and the family returns to Paris so François can take up an academic post. Now drinking and spending heavily, an unfulfilled Madeleine accuses François of using her as a beard while he argues he gave her son a respectable name. François' compulsive cottaging comes to a head when police arrive at the family's home to arrest him for a liaison he had with a 20-year-old student, legally underage. Though he is taken in, Madeleine defends François' name and tells him she loves him. After being threatened with a serious prison sentence and released on bail, François watches Madeleine send Daniel and Jeanne off to school before committing suicide by throwing himself under a truck.

Madeleine holds a touching funeral for François. Soon after, Daniel violently confronts Madeleine for his father's name before joining the army. Jeanne vows to read all the books in her father's office library over the course of her life (starting with a translation of The Picture of Dorian Gray). Madeleine begins her own nightclub business as she receives cancer treatment.

At Daniel's request, Madeleine writes a letter to the Wehrmacht archives admitting to her son's real parentage, which will finally enable Daniel to find out whether his biological father was killed on the Eastern Front.

== Cast ==
- Anaïs Demoustier as Madeleine Villedieu
- Vincent Lacoste as François Delambre
- Hélios Karyo as Daniel (5 years old)
  - Josse Capet as Daniel (10 years old)
  - Paul Beaurepaire as Daniel (18 years old)
- Margot Ringard Oldra as Jeanne
- Morgan Bailey as Jimmy Wayle

== Production ==
The film was partially inspired by Quillévéré's own grandmother, who kept the secret that her oldest child had been conceived in an affair with a German soldier until very late in life. In a pre-premiere interview for the Cannes Film Festival, Quillévéré described the film as an attempt to "intertwine my passion for Maurice Pialat and Douglas Sirk," by making a film whose melodramatic, Sirkian plot was effectively in conflict with a more realistic and Pialat-like aesthetic not in keeping with the stylistic conventions of traditional melodrama.

The film went into production in spring 2022.

== Distribution ==
The film premiered in the Cannes Premiere program of the 2023 Cannes Film Festival, where it was nominated for the Queer Palm.

It was theatrically released in France on 29 November 2023 by Gaumont.

== Reception ==
=== Critical response ===
Wendy Ide of Screen Daily wrote that the film is "a solid, watchable drama that, while perhaps lacking some of the directorial flair of Heal the Living, evocatively tallies the costs of living on the wrong side of social and sexual conventions in the 1950s and 60s."

Fabien Lemercier of Cineuropa reviewed the film positively, writing that "Shot with a camera on the shoulder and amidst natural decor, the film takes a highly sensitive, controlled approach to offer up a modernised, nigh-on naturalistic variation on the classic melodramatic films. Paying equal attention to each of her (brilliantly acted) protagonists, Katell Quillévéré crafts a skilful work of a kind we don’t often see, spanning three time periods (preceded by a prologue of archive material and followed by an epilogue in the comforting tradition of the best films of this kind). A tale where happiness walks a tightrope above abysses, driven by a desire like that expressed by Stefan Zweig in Amok: 'It’s only through passion that you’ll get to know the world around you! Because where secrets abound, life begins too.'"

Jordan Mintzer of The Hollywood Reporter was more mixed, writing that "the film isn’t a total misfire, and it conveys a strong, at times moving message about the sacrifices required in love and marriage, especially during a period as chaotic as the post-war era. But it does so in ways that can feel overcooked and clichéd, relying more on melodramatic tropes than on the subtle drama found in Quillévéré’s previous works."

=== Awards and nominations ===
Award	Date of ceremony	Category	Recipient(s)	Result	Ref.
Cannes Film Festival	26 May 2023	Queer Palm	Katell Quillevéré	Nominated	
Angoulême Francophone Film Festival	27 August 2023	Best Film	Katell Quillevéré	Won	
Angoulême Francophone Film Festival	27 August 2023	Best Actor	Vincent Lacoste	Won	
Lumière Awards	22 January 2024	Best Actor	Vincent Lacoste	Nominated	
