= Demographics of Czechoslovakia =

Demographics of a country

Czechoslovakia had a peak population of 15.6 million, mainly composed of Czechs, Germans, Slovaks, Hungarians, Romani people, Silesians, Ruthenians, Ukrainians, Poles and Jews. The ethnic composition of Czechoslovakia changed over time from Czechs and Sudeten Germans being the most prominent ethnicities to Czechs and Slovaks making up two-thirds of the demographic. Amongst this demographic, there was also a diverse range of religions, with Roman Catholic being the most prominent. This population has been found to have had an increasing growth rate that had a declining trajectory. The population density was approximately 121 persons per square kilometre, with the highest population density being in Moravia of 154 persons per square kilometre.

== Population ==
As of 1991, Czechoslovakia had a population of 15.6 million, of which by ethnicity 62.8% were Czechs (including Moravians), 31% Slovaks, 3.8% Hungarians, 0.7% Roma, and 0.4% Silesians. Smaller groups of Rusyns, Ukrainians, Germans, Austrians, Poles, and Jews (the post-Holocaust community) combined made up the remaining 1.6% of the population.

=== Population growth rate ===
The population growth rate was 2.7% in 1985, falling to 1.7% in 1990. Its decreasing tendency was sharper in the Czech Republic than in Slovakia. In 1989, life expectancy was 67.7 years for men and 75.3 years for women. About 23.1% of the population was under the age of 15, and 19% was over the age of 60.

=== Population density ===
The population density in 1986 was approximately 121 persons per square kilometer. The most densely settled geographic region was Moravia, which had around 154 persons per square kilometer. The figure for Bohemia was around 120, and for Slovakia, around 106. The major cities and their estimated populations in January 1986 were as follows:

- Prague (ČSR) 1.2 million (1.85 million in the Metropolitan area)
- Bratislava (SSR) 417,103
- Brno (ČSR) 385,684
- Ostrava (ČSR) 327,791
- Košice (SSR) 222,175
- Plzeň (ČSR) 175,244

Czechoslovakia remained essentially a society of small cities and towns, in which about 65% of the population were classified as urban dwellers.

== Ethnic composition ==
Czechoslovakia's ethnic composition in 1987 offered a stark contrast to that of the First Republic (see History). The Sudeten Germans that made up the majority of the population in border regions were forcibly expelled after World War II, and Carpathian Ruthenia (poor and overwhelmingly Ukrainian and Hungarian) had been ceded to the Soviet Union following World War II. Czechs and Slovaks, about two-thirds of the First Republic's population in 1930, represented about 94% of the population by 1950, with Hungarians as the third largest group.

Following the expulsion of the ethnic German population from Czechoslovakia, parts of the former Sudetenland, especially around Krnov and the surrounding villages of the Jeseníky mountain region (collective name of Nízký Jeseník and Hrubý Jeseník) in northeastern Czechoslovakia, were settled in 1949 by Communist refugees from Northern Greece who had left their homeland as a result of the Greek Civil War. These Greeks made up a large proportion of the town and region's population until the late 1980s/early 1990s. Although defined as "Greeks", the Greek Communist community of Krnov and the Jeseníky region actually consisted of an ethnically diverse population, including Greek Macedonians, Slavo-Macedonians, Vlachs, Pontic Greeks and Turkish speaking Urums or Caucasus Greeks.

The aspirations of ethnic minorities had been the pivot of the First Republic's politics. This was no longer the case in the 1980s. Nevertheless, ethnicity continued to be a pervasive issue and an integral part of Czechoslovak life. Although the country's ethnic composition had been simplified, the division between Czechs and Slovaks remained; each group had a very similar history, but sometimes divergent aspirations.

From 1950 through 1983, the Slovak share of the total population increased steadily. The Czech population as a portion of the total declined by about 4%, while the Slovak population increased by slightly more than that. The actual numbers did not imperil a Czech majority; in 1983 there were still more than two Czechs for every Slovak. In the mid-1980s, the respective fertility rates were fairly close, but the Slovak fertility rate was declining more slowly.

For details on ethnic groups, see also:

- History of Czechoslovakia (1918–1938)
- History of Czechoslovakia (1948–1989)

== Religious affiliations in 1930 ==
In the 1930 census, Czechoslovakia's population was divided in the following religious denominations:

- Roman Catholic - 73.5%
- Protestants - 7.67%
- Czechoslovak Hussite Church 5.39%
- Greek and Armenian Catholics 3.97%
- Jews - 2.42%
- Orthodox - 0.99%
- No affiliation - 5.8%

== See also ==
- Demographics of the Czech Republic
- Demographics of Slovakia
