= Martha a Tena =

Czech music duo

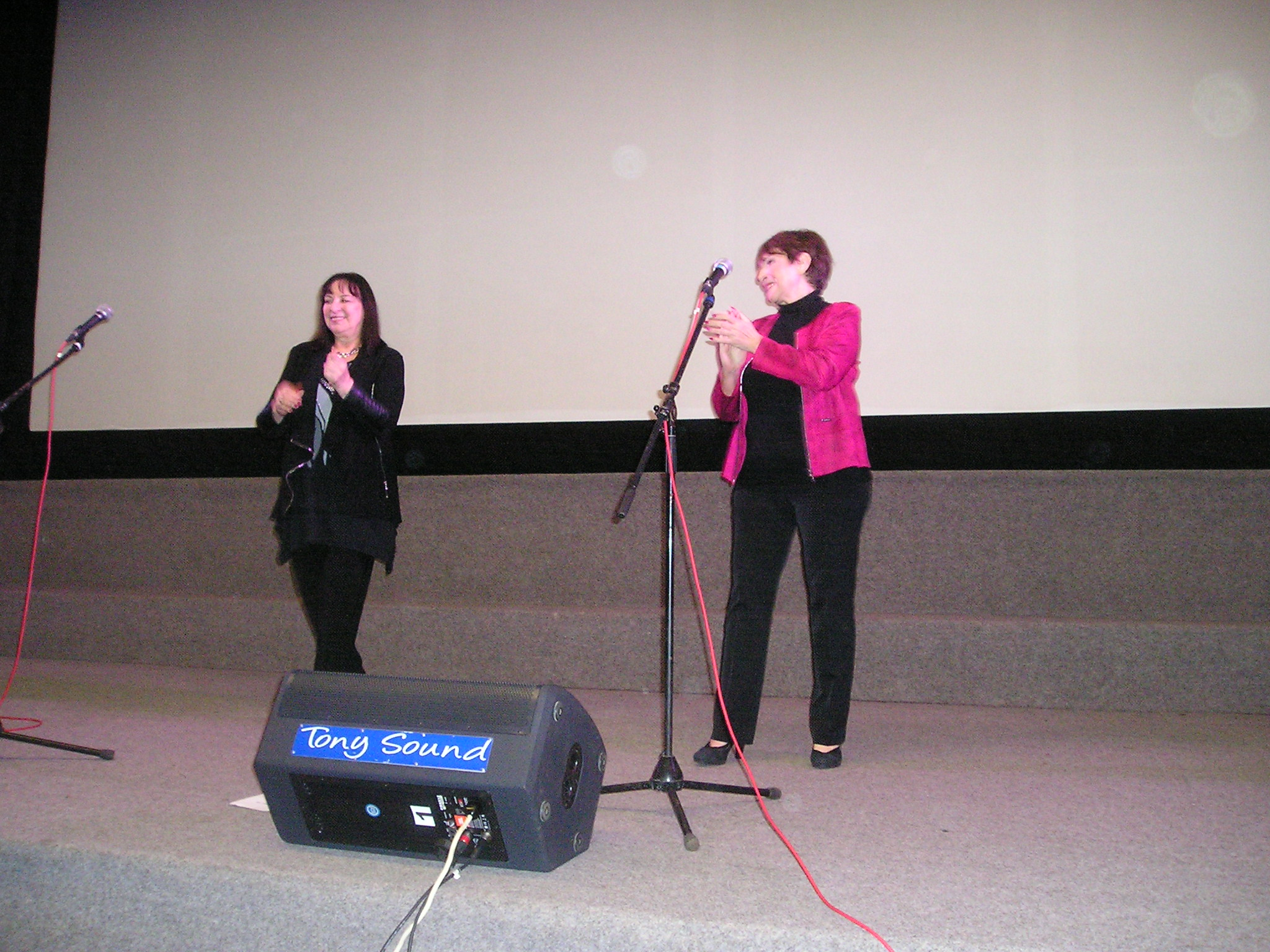
- 2017 in Český Těšín

Background information
- Born: 12 September 1946 (age 79); Bulkes, Yugoslavia
- Origin: Czech Republic
- Years active: 1960s–present
- Labels: Panton, Supraphon
- Members: Martha Elefteriadu; Tena Elefteriadu
- Website: martha-tena.net

Martha a Tena is a Czech music duo whose members are sisters Martha Elefteriadu and Tena Elefteriadu.

Martha Elefteriadu (born 12 September 1946 Bulkes, Yugoslavia) is a Czech singer of Greek origin, half of the duo Martha a Tena, together with her sister Tena.

Tena Elefteriadu, born as Partena Elefteriadu (born 16 April 1948) is a Czech singer of Greek origin, member of the duo Martha a Tena.

== Personal life ==
Their family emigrated from Greece because of the Greek Civil War and settled in 1950 in former Czechoslovakia. Their mother died while they were children, so they grew up in orphanages, they went through 5 of them, including one in Ivančice.

Martha, after matura at a gymnasium (school) studied first general medicine, then changed major to psychology, and graduated from Charles University in Prague.

Tena has a son Marko Elefteriadis, a rapper who performs under stage name Ektor.

== Career ==
At the end of the 1960s the sisters met a guitarist Aleš Sigmund from band Vulkán, who helped them create strong creative and musical foundations. Their first records are from 1968, in 1970 they released their first LP record with Panton Records Dál než slunce vstává. They quickly established themselves in Czech Pop music. They collaborated with many notable artists. Martha and Tena enriched Czech culture with their southern temperament and Greek spontaneity.

Currently their repertoire is focused on Greek folk songs and they also teach Greek dances.

Martha occasionally hosts a radio show Noční Mikrofórum at Český Rozhlas Dvojka.

== Discography ==
=== LP ===
- Dál než slunce vstává – Panton 1970
- Hrej dál – Panton 1972
- Modré království – Panton 1973
- Ať se múzy poperou – Panton 1975
- Řecké prázdniny – Panton 1977
- Kresby tuší – Panton 1980
- A desky dál stárnou – Panton 1983

=== CD ===
- Nejkrásnější řecké písně – Multisonic 1992
- Martha a Tena The best of 1969–1982 – Panton 1993
- Děti z Pirea – B.M.G. 1995
- Kresby tuší – Martha Elefteriadu Supraphon 2000
- Řecké prázdniny a největší hity – Supraphon 2001
- Řecké slunce – B.M.B. 2001
- Ať se múzy poperou – 24 hitů – Supraphon 2006
- V rytmu řeckého tance – Popron 2006

== Sources ==
- Martha Elefteriadu: Málem z nás byly Maďarky interview in Deník (in Czech)

== See also ==
- Bratislavská lýra
- Greeks in the Czech Republic
