= Czech Republic–Greece relations =

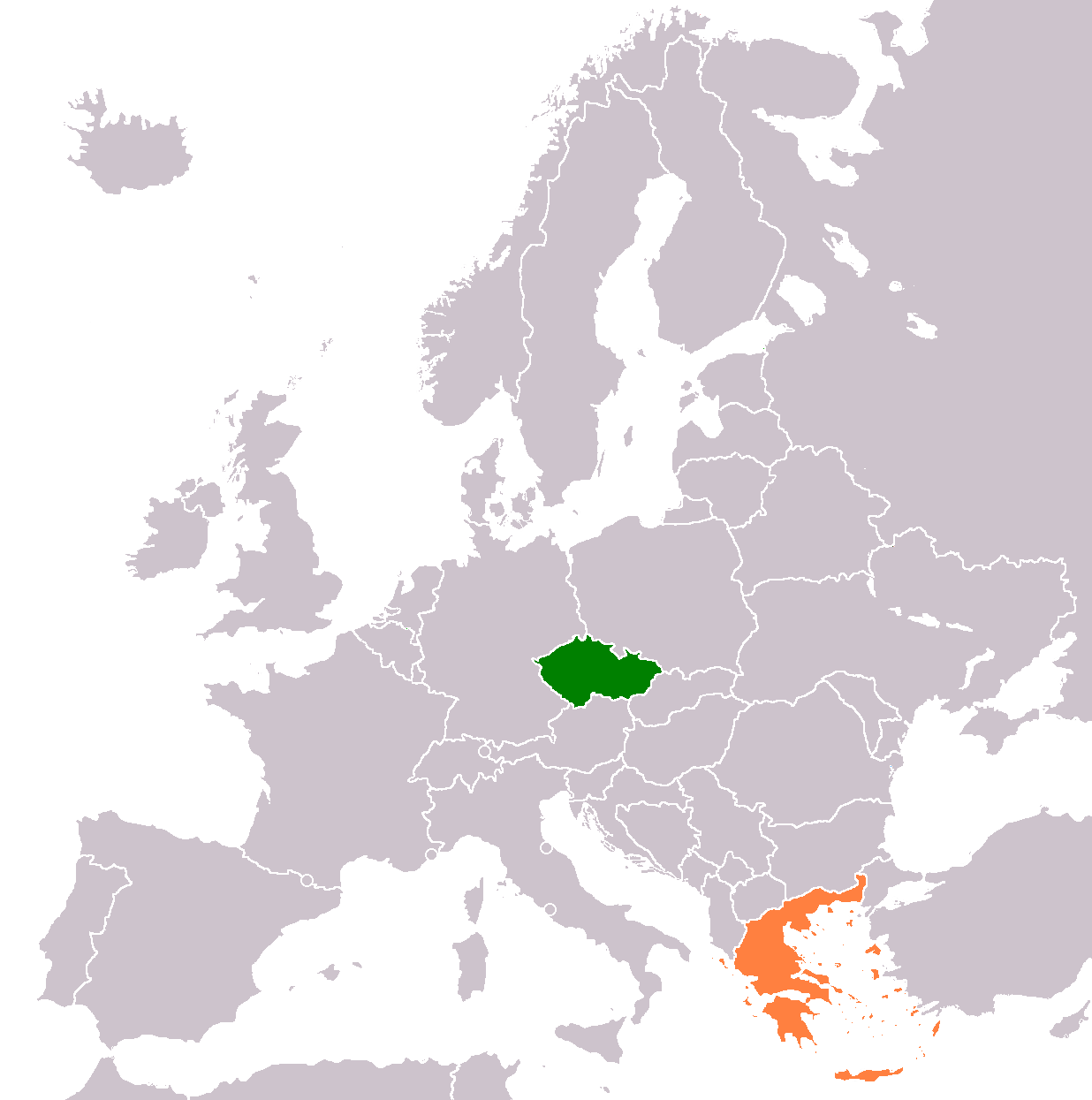
- Czech Republic: Greece

Czech Republic–Greece relations are foreign relations between the Czech Republic and Greece. The diplomatic relations between Greece and former Czechoslovakia were established in 1920 - after Czechoslovakia's foundation. Czech Republic and Greece established diplomatic relations on January 1, 1993. Each country has an embassy in the other's capital. Both countries are members of the European Union, NATO, the OECD, the OSCE, the Council of Europe, and the World Trade Organization.

A Czech military contingent participated in a NATO mission to assist Greece in ensuring security during the 2004 Summer Olympics.

In December 2015 Greek diplomat Panayotis Sarris was briefly recalled from Prague to Athens due to a misunderstood public statement by Czech President Miloš Zeman, who spoke about the consequences of the European debt crisis.

== International organizations ==
Greece joined the EU in 1981, while the Czech Republic joined in 2004. Greece joined NATO in 1952, and the Czech Republic in 1999. Greece fully supported the Czech Republic's applications to join both the EU and NATO.

== Diplomacy ==
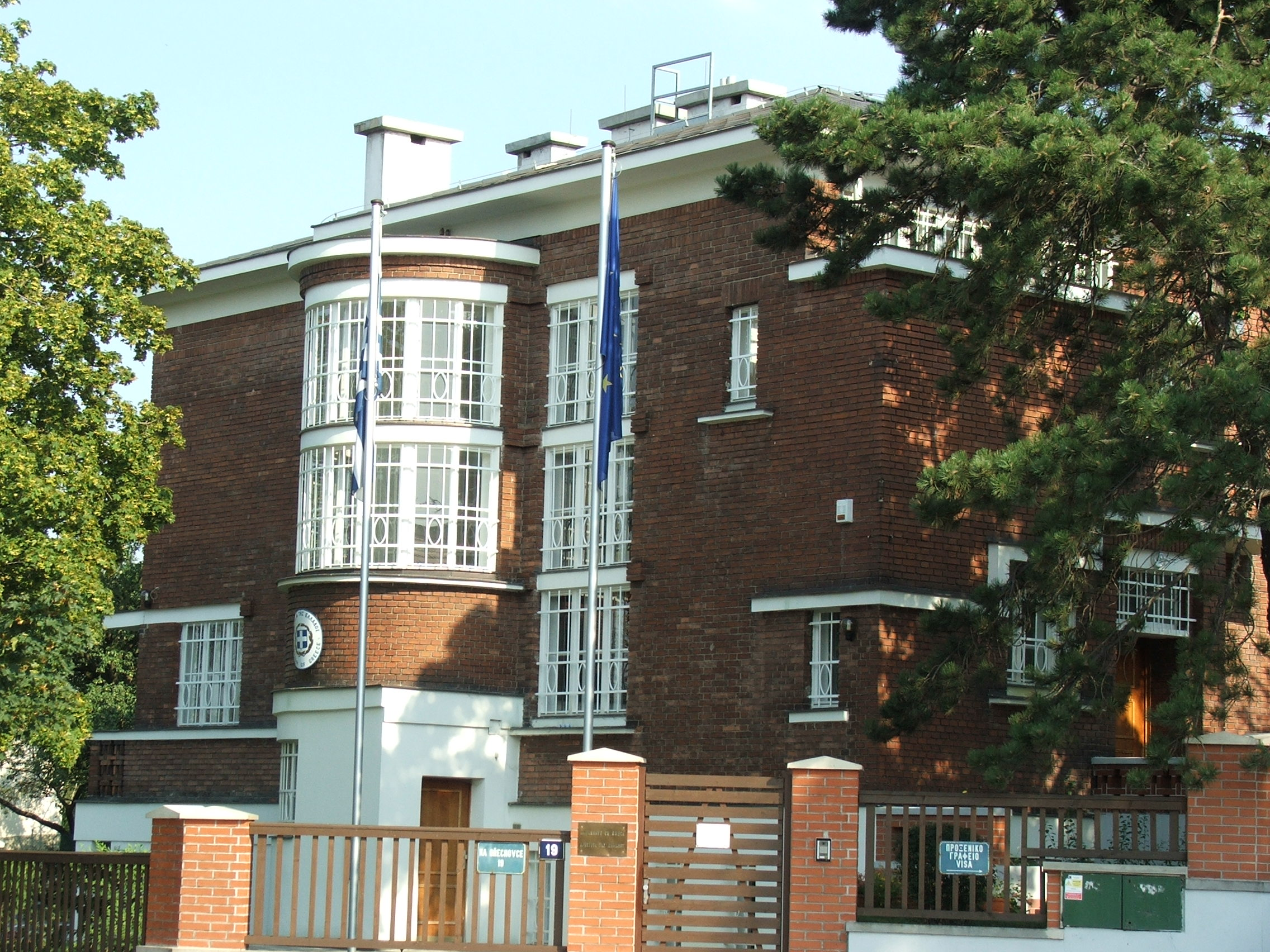
Embassy of Greece in Prague

Czech Republic

- Athens (Embassy)

Republic of Greece

- Prague (Embassy)

== See also ==
- Foreign relations of the Czech Republic
- Foreign relations of Greece
- NATO-EU relations
- Greeks in the Czech Republic
