= The Shaved Woman of Chartres =

1944 photograph by Robert Capa

The Shaved Woman of Chartres (1944)

The Shaved Woman of Chartres (French: La Tondue de Chartres) is a black and white photograph taken by Robert Capa in Chartres on 16 August 1944. This picture was first published in Life magazine and became iconic of the épuration sauvage (wild purge) enacted after the liberation of France and the severe punishment imposed on the French women accused of so-called horizontal collaboration with the German occupiers.

== History and description ==
During the liberation of France, French women deemed collaborators with the Nazi regime, especially those who had been romantically or sexually involved with German men, were punished with head shaving. Many were paraded through the streets as a means of humiliation, usually before being sent to jail. One of these women, Simone Touseau, 23 years old, had been a translator working for the Germans and was in a relationship with a German soldier since 1941, bearing him a daughter. She was accused of denouncing neighbours who ended up being deported, an accusation she denied. The photo depicts her being paraded through the streets of Chartres, carrying her infant daughter in her arms, after her head had been shaven and her forehead branded with a red-hot iron as a sign of collaborationism. She is followed by a number of people, including women, children and policemen. Her father walks ahead, carrying a bag, possibly with the shaved hair, while her mother, who also suffered the same punishment, is partially covered by him. She is being escorted home, from where she would be sent to jail.

== Cultural references ==
This case and the picture in particular were the subject of the documentary La Tondue de Chartres (2017), directed by Patrick Cabouat. It also inspired a novel by French author Julie Héraclès, titled Vous ne connaissez rien de moi ("You don't know anything about me") and released in 2023.

== Public collections ==
A print of the photograph is held at the collection of the International Center of Photography, in New York.
