= Czech Republic–Italy relations =

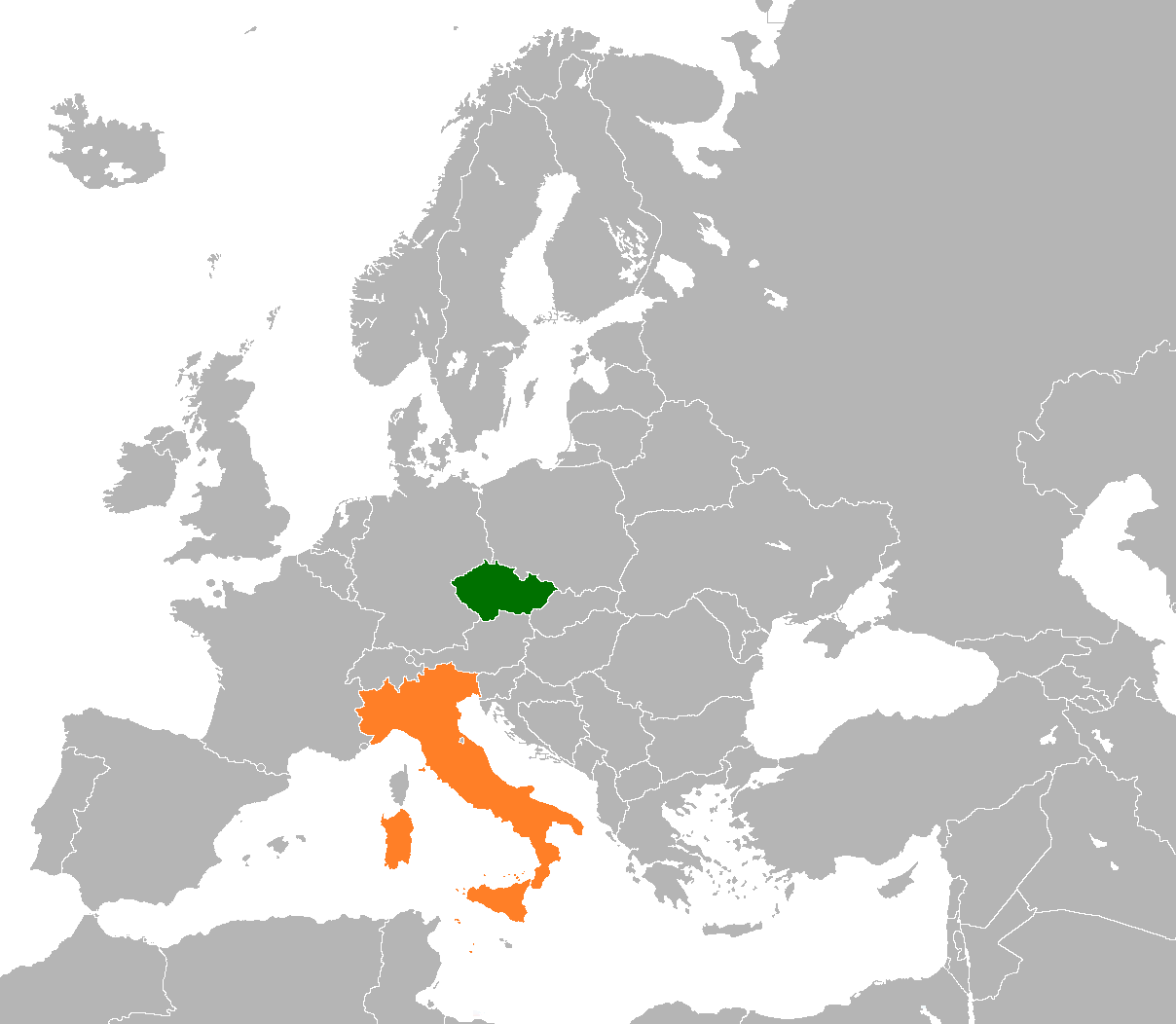
- Czech Republic: Italy

Czech Republic–Italy relations are bilateral relations between the Czech Republic and Italy. Both nations are full members of the European Union, NATO, OECD, OSCE, Council of Europe, World Trade Organization and United Nations.

== History ==
Relations date back to the Middle Ages, and in 1272, Bohemian (Czech) rule also reached north-eastern Italy, after King Ottokar II of Bohemia acquired the region of Friuli and became de facto administrator of the Patriarchate of Aquileia.

The Kingdom of Bohemia and Papal States were part of a coalition of several European countries in the Crusade of Varna of 1443–1444, whose goal was to repel the Ottoman invasion of Europe and liberate the already conquered nations of Southeast Europe.

Following Austria's conquests and annexations, both Bohemia and parts of Italy belonged to the Austrian Empire (from 1867 Austria-Hungary) until the end of World War I in 1918. Italian freedom fighters, known as Carbonari, were, like Hungarian and Polish freedom fighters, imprisoned by the Austrians in the Špilberk Castle in Brno. Among the prisoners was Italian poet Silvio Pellico. There is a memorial to the Carbonari at the site.

During World War II, Italians were among Allied prisoners of war held by the German occupiers in the Stalag IV-C and Stalag 359 prisoner-of-war camps, and in several subcamps of the Flossenbürg concentration camp in present-day Czechia.

== International organizations ==
While Italy is a founding member of the EU and NATO, the Czech Republic became a member of NATO in 1999 and the EU in 2004.

== Resident diplomatic missions ==
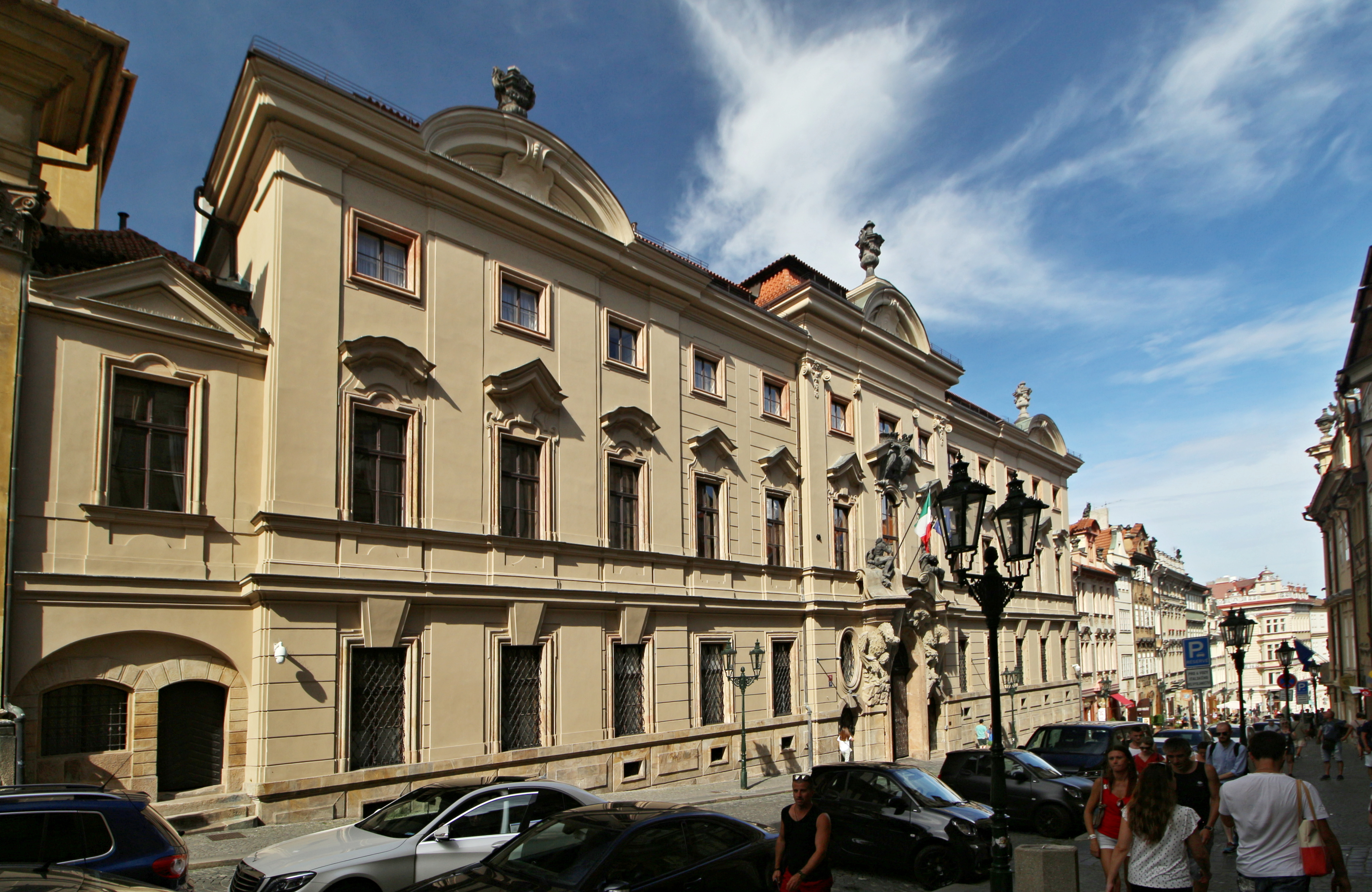
Embassy of Italy, Prague

- Czechia has an embassy in Rome, a consulate-general in Milan.
- Italy has an embassy in Prague and an honorary consulate in Brno.

== See also ==
- Foreign relations of the Czech Republic
- Foreign relations of Italy
