= Jagnula Kunovska =

Macedonian jurist, politician and artist (1943–2024)

Member of the Assembly of North Macedonia

Assembly Member for Skopje and Kumanovo

Personal details
- Born: August 15, 1943 Kastoria, Axis-occupied Greece
- Died: 29 December 2024 (aged 81) Skopje
- Party: New Social Democratic Party; VMRO-DPMNE
- Education: Ss. Cyril and Methodius University of Skopje
- Occupation: Jurist, artist and journalist

Jagnula Kunovska (Macedonian: Јагнула Куновска; 1943 – 29 December 2024) was a Macedonian jurist, politician and artist.

== Biography ==
Kunovska was born in the Greek city of Kastoria in 1943. She was the granddaughter of the Kastorian voivode, Nikola Dobrolitski. She was evacuated to the city of Tetovo in the People's Republic of Macedonia in 1948 as one of the many political refugees of the Greek Civil War. She finished a law degree at Skopje University. She then worked as a lawyer in Skopje. She was a member of the Association of writers from Macedonia. She soon became a leading jurist in the Socialist Republic of Macedonia.

In 1990 she became a founding member of the Macedonian political party, Movement for All-Macedonian Action (MAAK). She was a supporter of Tito Petkovski's bid for the Presidency of the Republic of Macedonia in 1999. In 2006 she ran for election in the Skopje and Kumanovo regions as part of the New Social Democratic Party. In 2006 there was a controversy between Kunovska and Vlado Bučkovski which involved claims of Bulgarianisation. In 2007 she left the New Social Democratic Party and became a member of the leading party of the Republic of Macedonia, VMRO–DPMNE During 2008 she has participated in the writing of the magazine "Makedonski Duhovni Konaci".

Kunovska died on 29 December 2024, at the age of 81.
