= Czech Republic–NATO relations =

Czech Republic – NATO relations
- Czech Republic: NATO

Czech Republic joined North Atlantic Treaty Organization (NATO) on 12 March 1999, following the decision taken at the Madrid Summit, in July 1997.

== History ==
Czech Republic joined the Partnership for Peace in 1994. Czech Republic, along with the Hungary and Poland, received an invitation to participate in the 1997 Madrid Summit and became a full member on 12 March 1999.

Since it began in 2001, Czech troops have been part of the NATO-led mission in Afghanistan, ISAF.

=== Finnish and Swedish accession bids ===
On 31 August 2022, Czech president Miloš Zeman signed and approved the proposals for Finland and Sweden to apply to join NATO.

== the Czech Republic's foreign relations with NATO member states ==
- Albania
- Belgium
- Bulgaria
- Canada
- Croatia
- Denmark
- Estonia
- Finland
- France
- Germany
- Greece
- Hungary
- Iceland
- Italy
- Latvia
- Lithuania
- Luxembourg
- Montenegro
- Netherlands
- North Macedonia
- Norway
- Poland
- Portugal
- Romania
- Slovakia
- Slovenia
- Spain
- Sweden
- Turkey
- United Kingdom
- United States

== See also ==
- Foreign relations of the Czech Republic
- Foreign relations of NATO
