= Horizontal collaboration =

Collaboration and intimate relationships between French women and Nazi occupiers

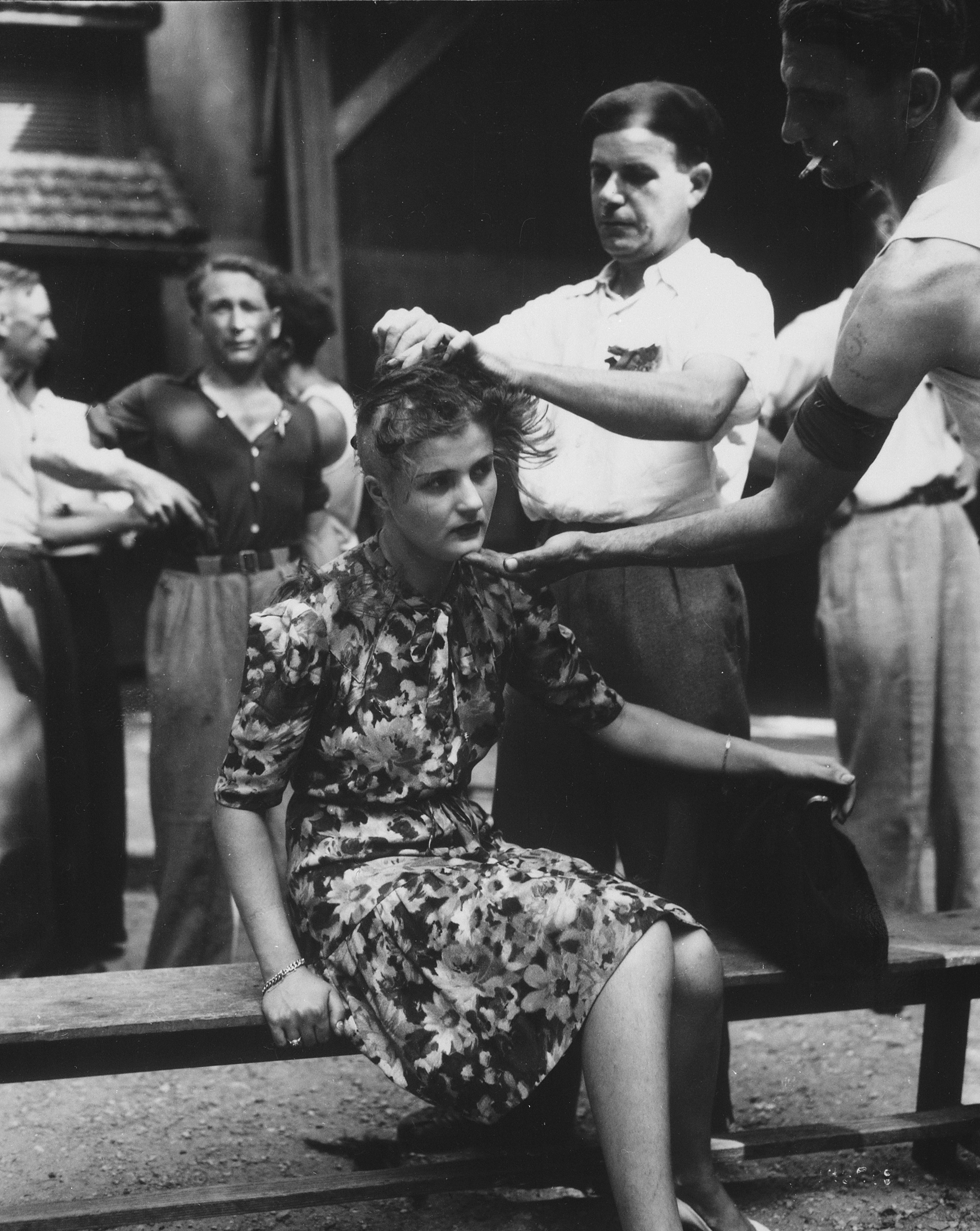
A woman's head is shaved as punishment for collaboration horizontale. Montélimar area, August 1944.

Horizontal collaboration (French: Collaboration horizontale, collaboration féminine or collaboration sentimentale) referred to the romantic or sexual relationship that many women in France actually or allegedly had with members of the German occupation forces after the Fall of France in 1940. The existence of those liaisons had been a major reason for young men to join the French Resistance. After the Liberation of France from German occupation, such women were often punished for collaboration with the German occupiers.

After the war, throughout France, women accused of collaboration had their heads shaved. These women were referred to as "femmes tondues" (shaven women) and were easily identifiable. In many of the 20,000 cases, the women in question had performed only professional services for the occupying Germans, rather than being engaged in sexual relationships with them. The head-shaving in public spaces being used to punish women thought to be collaborators and the presence of many foreign photographers in post-war France have caused thousands of photos to exist of women being subjected to that punishment.

"Collaboration horizontale" is believed to have produced 200,000 French babies with German fathers. Since 2009 Germany has offered these children of "the other bank of the Rhine" citizenship, after French foreign minister Bernard Kouchner lobbied for their recognition. The same phenomenon and later punishments occurred in other parts of Europe that were occupied by Germany during the war.

== Outside France ==
Horizontal collaboration was also seen and condemned in other countries occupied by Germany during World War II, such as in Serbia, the Netherlands and in Norway, where the so-called Norwegian tyskertøser (German sluts) included thousands who actively participated in the Lebensborn program and others, such as the mother of ABBA member Anni-Frid Lyngstad, who independently had children with a German soldier. Rather than shaving their heads, women accused of horizontal collaboration in Norway were subjected to public exile and even arrest or internment. Any child that came from relationships between the local women and German soldiers was also considered part of the betrayal and so was equally exiled and considered illegitimate or bastards; Lyngstad's mother sent her to Sweden to avoid that. In both Norway and Serbia, horizontal collaboration was seen as a betrayal of one's own country during the war and was often treated as an act of aggression.

In October 2018, Norwegian Prime Minister Erna Solberg publicly apologized to the tyskertøser and their children for the treatment that they received following the liberation.

== In popular media ==
In Hiroshima mon amour (1959), the female protagonist is revealed to have been shaven as punishment for collaboration horizontale as a result of her relationship with a German soldier. The film visually linked the suffering of women forcibly shaved after D-Day with the loss of hair experienced by survivors of Hiroshima and Nagasaki.

The phenomenon also inspired the 2010 film Collaboration horizontale, a documentary exploring what happened to the baby shown in the photo of The Shaved Woman of Chartres.

In the 2000 film Malèna, a woman in wartime Sicily is punished for her beauty and her liaisons with German soldiers by the local women ripping off her clothes, beating her and shaving her hair.

In the fourth episode of the 2001 series Band of Brothers, multiple Dutch women can be seen shaved with a black swastika on their forehead for collaborating with the Nazis.

The 2019 graphic novel Horizontal Collaboration tells the story of a liaison between a French woman and a German soldier in wartime France.

The 2023 film Lee includes a scene in which the titular character, during the Liberation of Paris, photographs women being publicly humiliated for working with the Germans.

== See also ==
- The Shaved Woman of Chartres (1944 photograph)
