= Ilios Yannakakis =

French historian and political scientist

Ilios Yannakakis (13 September 1931 in Cairo, Egypt – 16 January 2017 in Paris) was a French historian and political scientist of Greek descent, professor emeritus of the University of Lille III.

He joined the Communist Party of Greece and after the Greek Civil War of 1946-1949 he fled to Paris and eventually to communist Czechoslovakia. There he fell victim of purge of the communist party. After the death of Joseph Stalin he continued lecturing. He was engaged in struggle for human rights and after the defeat of the Prague Spring he fled to France.

In 2003 he became the editorial board of the Le Meilleur des mondes, a magazine of the French political think tank Cercle de l'Oratoire.

A fictionalized account of his life was presented in the book Matin Rouge ("Red Sunrise") by Chantal Delsol.

== Books ==
- Premier retour de Bagdad (with Pierre Rigoulot), 1998, ISBN 2-226-11432-7
- Un Pavé dans l'histoire. Le débat français sur "Le Livre noir du communisme" (with Pierre Rigoulot), 1998, ISBN 2-221-08882-4
- Alexandrie 1860-1960. Un modèle éphémère de convivialité : Communautés et identité cosmopolite (with Robert Ilbert), 1998, ISBN 2-86260-392-9
- Histoire du monde (with André Berelowitch, a textbook), 1986, ISBN 2-218-07516-4
