= Katell Quillévéré =

French filmmaker (born 1980)

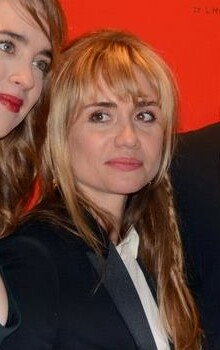
- Quillévéré in 2014
- Born: 30 January 1980 (age 45); Abidjan, Ivory Coast
- Occupations: Film director; screenwriter
- Years active: 2003–present

Katell Quillévéré (French: [katɛl kileveʁe]; born 30 January 1980) is a French filmmaker.

== Early life ==
Quillévéré is the daughter of an IT worker and science teacher. She was born and brought up in the Ivory Coast until the age of five. She comes from a Breton family from Finistère.

Her family returned to Paris and after studying at the Lycée Fénelon, chose a career in cinema. Failing to get a place at la Fémis, she took a Diplôme d'études approfondies (DEA) at the l'université Paris-VIII where she also studied philosophy. During this time she met her partner another director-to-be Hélier Cisterne.

== Career ==
With Sébastien Bailly she set up the Festival du cinéma at Brive dedicated to medium length films. She made a series of short films, the first was À bras le corps in 2005 which was selected for the Quinzaine des réalisateurs at Cannes and nominated for a César. She then made L'Imprudence in 2007 and L’Échappée in 2009.

Her first feature Un Poison violent (Love like Poison) was set in Brittany and was the story of a young adolescent girl torn between family loyalties, her religious beliefs and the changes from girl to woman. It won the Jean Vigo prize. Her second feature Suzanne was about a young woman living a normal life whose world is disturbed by a romance with a troubled man that takes her into a life on the wrong side of the tracks. It was shown at the 2013 Cannes Film Festival and received good reviews with Le Monde's critic describing her as treading in the steps of Maurice Pialat.

In 2015, she was selected to be a member of the jury for the Critics' Week section of the 2015 Cannes Film Festival.

== Filmography ==
Year	Title	Credited as		Notes
Year	Title	Director	Screenwriter	Notes
2003	Dehors		Yes	Short film
2005	With All My Might (À bras le corps)	Yes	Yes	Short film
2007	L'Imprudence	Yes	Yes	Short film
2009	Escape (L'Échappée)	Yes	Yes	Short film
2010	Love Like Poison (Un poison violent)	Yes	Yes	Prix Jean Vigo; Nominated—Caméra d'Or
2013	Suzanne	Yes	Yes	Thessaloniki Film Festival - Special Jury Award; Nominated—César Award for Best Original Screenplay; Nominated—Globes de Cristal Award for Best Film
2013	Vandal		Yes	
2016	Heal the Living (Réparer les vivants)	Yes	Yes	Nominated—César Award for Best Adaptation
2023	Along Came Love (Le Temps d'aimer)	Yes	Yes	

== Awards and honors ==
- Chevalier of the Order of Arts and Letters (2015)
