= Greeks in the Czech Republic =

The Greeks in the Czech Republic have a presence dating back to the 20th century. Roughly 12,000 Greek citizens, mainly from Greek Macedonia in Northern Greece, who fled from the 1946–1949 Greek Civil War were settled in several formerly German inhabited areas in Czechoslovakia.

== Migration history ==
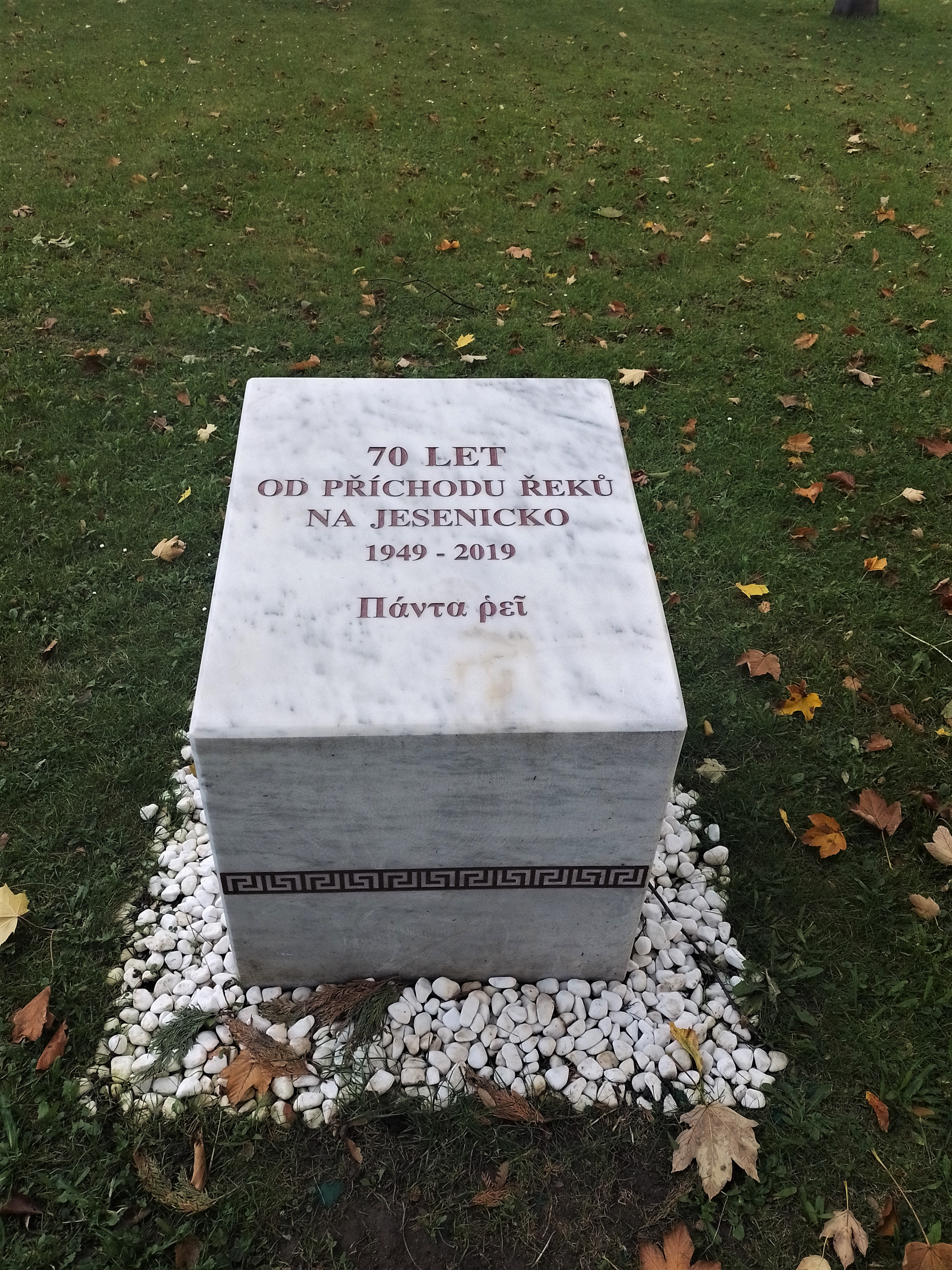
Monument "70 years since the arrival of the Greeks in the Jeseník region 1949–2019" in Jeseník

The admission of Greek Communist refugees to Czechoslovakia at the end of the 1946–1949 Greek Civil War was facilitated by members of the Communist Party of Greece (KKE) living in exile in Bucharest, Romania. Though they initially expected that the refugees they would soon return to Greece, due to the development of the political situation they could predict no definite end to their stay in Czechoslovakia. As a result, many eventually naturalised as Czechoslovak citizens and generally assimilated, often intermarrying with local Czechs or the small but significant minority of Sudeten Germans allowed to remain in Czechoslovakia following its liberation from Nazi German occupation.

In many cases, these Greek refugees were resettled in houses which had formerly been owned by Sudeten Germans and were left unoccupied following the expulsion of Germans from Czechoslovakia. Most were concentrated in or around the towns of Brno, Ostrava, Opava, Krnov and the Jeseník District in Czech Silesia, where Greek farming expertise helped revive agricultural production on lands formerly worked by ethnic Germans. About 5,200 of the migrants consisted of unaccompanied children.

The migrants were ethnically heterogeneous, consisting not just of Greek Macedonians, Pontic Greeks and Caucasus Greeks but also Slavo-Macedonians, Aromanians, Sephardi Jews, and even small numbers of Turkish-speaking Greeks or Urums originating in Georgia and Eastern Anatolia.

Beginning in 1975, shortly after the overthrow of the Colonels' dictatorship and a programme of political liberalisation in Greece which led to the legalisation of the KKE, several thousand young Greeks, including those born in Czechoslovakia, emigrated to Greece. Older Greeks followed them some years later, after an arrangement was made between the Greek and Czechoslovak governments for them to receive their pensions in Greece. By 1991, there were just 3,443 people in Czechoslovakia who declared Greek ethnicity; almost all of those were in the Czech portion of the country, with just 65 in the Slovak portion. However, many of those who did emigrate to (mainly northern) Greece continued to retain strong links with the Czech Republic, with a few even using their dual Greek-Czech national identities and contacts to help establish trade links between the two countries.

== Language ==
In their early days in the Czechoslovak Socialist Republic, ethnic Greek Macedonian and Slav Macedonian migrants used Greek as their natural lingua franca; however in orphanages which housed unaccompanied child migrants, it was not uncommon for ethnic Greek children to become receptively bilingual in the Slav-Macedonian language spoken by their playmates. In later years, locally born members of the community showed increasing language shift towards Czech, and tended to have a somewhat weaker command of Greek. However, this may also have been a natural consequence of several factors, including: intermarriage with Czechs and Sudeten Germans, the communist Czechoslovak education system's emphasis on Russian as a second language at the expense of providing for minority-language education, and even the fact many ethnic Greek Macedonians residing in Czechoslovakia were actually Pontic Greeks and Caucasus Greeks and so somewhat more comfortable with the Pontic Greek dialect and/or the Eastern Anatolia dialect of Turkish rather than the Standard (Demotic) Greek used by the majority of Greek speakers.

In situations where families from these communities had ancestors originating in Southern Russia, as was the case with those defined as Caucasus Greeks or Urum, there had been a long tradition of using Russian as a second language after Pontic Greek and Turkish anyway. But the use of Russian was further reinforced in Soviet-dominated Czechoslovakia by the compulsory teaching of the language in schools.

Although a poor command of Modern Greek was previously often evident among the grandchildren of Greek refugees born in the 1980s and later, those from families who returned to Greece from the mid-70s have now been fully re-assimilated into Greek society and the Modern Greek education system. In fact, their multi-lingual background has enabled ethnic Greeks from Czechoslovakia (and elsewhere in the former Soviet Bloc) to develop and exploit a marked facility in foreign language learning and communication.

== Next Generation Migration - 2008 Greek economic crisis ==
The next migration was caused by the Greek government-debt crisis in 2008. From 2008 at least 200,000 Greeks emigrated abroad. The main reason for Greeks choosing to move to the Czech Republic was job vacancies at foreign companies, mostly IT companies.

== Notable people ==
- Martha Elefteriadu and Parthena "Tena" Elefteriadu
- Michal Papadopulos
- Jana Michailidu
- Loukas Vyntra

== See also ==
- Czech Republic–Greece relations
- Czechs in Greece
- Greek diaspora
- Immigration to the Czech Republic
