= Max Lagarrigue =

- Max Lagarrigue in 2025.
- Born: November 19, 1972 (age 53); Castelsarrasin, France
- Education: Toulouse-Jean Jaurès University; Paris Nanterre University; Sciences Po
- Occupations: Crime reporter, historian
- Known for: Judicial reporting, history of rural communism and World War II

Max Lagarrigue (born 19 November 1972 in Castelsarrasin) is a French crime reporter, legal correspondent, and historian specialising in rural communism and the Second World War.

== Biography ==
=== Journalism career ===
Lagarrigue entered journalism following postgraduate research in modern history, without attending a formal journalism school. He supplemented his academic background with professional training placements at the École de journalisme de Toulouse (EJT). He launched his career in 2001 at the Montauban-based Journal du Palais, before joining the newsroom of regional daily La Dépêche du Midi in 2006.

In 2014, he moved into judicial reporting, covering daily hearings at local magistrates' courts and major trials before the Assize Courts across Tarn-et-Garonne and the wider region. He has also covered high-profile cases tried in Paris, including proceedings linked to the 2012 Toulouse and Montauban shootings and the trial of the Montauban "radicalised gardener" prosecuted for far-right terrorism. In 2021, he was appointed head of the legal affairs desk for Tarn-et-Garonne at La Dépêche du Midi's Montauban bureau. Since October 2026, he has been part of the La Dépêche group's specialist crime reporting desk and writes a weekly true crime newsletter.

As a crime expert, he appears on television investigative and true-crime broadcasts, including Faites entrer l'accusé (covering the Montauban double murder / Éric Gallo case), Complément d'enquête (investigating financial irregularities at Emmaüs), Enquêtes criminelles : le magazine des faits divers, Chroniques criminelles, and France 2's Au bout de l'enquête, la fin du crime parfait ? on the Mohamed Merah case, alongside commentary on BFM TV and CNews.

A member of the French Legal Press Association (APJ) since 2018, Lagarrigue was targeted in January 2024 by an intense online harassment campaign and death threats following articles he published on a local neighbour dispute involving a farmer in Montjoi. Singled out in a targeted video circulated by far-right networks, he received public support from his newsroom, the National Union of Journalists (SNJ), and the APJ. His case and testimony were featured on page 21 of the French Press Freedom Observatory's (OFALP) 2024 annual report to illustrate the growing threats faced by local journalists. The creator of the videos was sentenced in July 2024 by the Montauban Criminal Court to a 12-month suspended prison sentence with probation (currently under appeal before the Toulouse Court of Appeal, with a hearing date pending), and subsequently ordered to pay damages by the 17th Chamber of the Paris Judicial Court on 29 May 2026 (Note: Sentenced to pay a €500 fine, €800 in civil damages, and €1,000 in legal fees under Article 475-1 of the French Code of Criminal Procedure.).

=== Historical research ===
Renaud Jean. Carnets d'un paysan député communiste (2001).

A trained historian, Lagarrigue completed a master's degree in history in 1996 under the supervision of Pierre Laborie at the University of Toulouse-Le Mirail, titled Le PCF tarn-et-garonnais, de l'implantation à l'essor 1936-1946 ("The PCF in Tarn-et-Garonne: From Establishment to Expansion, 1936–1946"). He pursued doctoral research on rural communism in south-western France across six departments (Corrèze, Dordogne, Gers, Lot, Lot-et-Garonne, and Tarn-et-Garonne) from the 1930s to the 1960s, supervised by Pierre Laborie, Rémy Pech, and Marc Lazar.

He has taught the history of communism at Sciences Po in Paris and contributed academic papers to the journal Communisme (CNRS/GEODE), alongside publishing a political biography of Lot-et-Garonne MP Renaud Jean (2001).

Cover of the regional contemporary history journal Arkheia (issue 11-12-13, 2003).

In 1999, he founded the regional contemporary history journal Arkheia to showcase work by postgraduate researchers, local historians, and established academics. He edited 25 issues until the journal went on hiatus in 2012, publishing prominent scholars including Emmanuel Le Roy Ladurie, Geneviève Dreyfus-Armand, Serge Berstein, Jean-Pierre Rioux, and Michel Roquebert, alongside eyewitness accounts from resistance figures such as Henri Caillavet and Marie-Rose Gineste.

1940, la Belgique du repli. L'histoire d'une petite Belgique dans le Sud-Ouest de la France (2005).

In May 2000, the journal's publishing association hosted an international conference in Montauban entitled "La France du repli : les réfugiés dans le Midi, 1940", gathering over thirty researchers from France, Belgium, Germany, and the United States. The proceedings were published in 2001 in an edited volume, 1940, la France du repli – L’Europe de la défaite (Privat). He built upon this work with further studies on the influx of Belgian refugees during World War II and the historical ties between Tarn-et-Garonne and Belgium.

Manuel Azaña et la France (symposium proceedings).

In 2004, Lagarrigue organised an international symposium in Montauban on Manuel Azaña and the memory of the Spanish Civil War. The following year, he co-founded the "Présence de Manuel Azaña" association alongside historian Jean-Pierre Amalric, honouring the memory of the last president of the Second Spanish Republic. Five volumes stemming from the association's symposia were subsequently published by Arkheia under the joint editorship of Max Lagarrigue, Jean-Pierre Amalric, and Geneviève Dreyfus-Armand.

== Selected publications ==
- 99 questions… La France sous l'Occupation, Montpellier, CNDP, October 2007 ISBN 978-2-86626-280-8
- 1940, la Belgique du repli. L'histoire d'une petite Belgique dans le Sud-Ouest de la France, with Bénédicte Rochet, Charleroi, Éditions du Hainaut, 2005 ISBN 2-930336-60-9
- Toulouse et sa région, Hachette Guide Bleu, 2004
- Renaud Jean. Carnets d'un paysan député communiste, Biarritz, Atlantica, 2001, 531 p. ISBN 2-84394-244-6
- 1940, La France du repli : l'Europe de la défaite (ed.), Toulouse, Privat, 2001, 384 p. ISBN 2-7089-0528-7

=== Academic papers and contributions ===
==== Historical studies ====
- "La France du repli, 1940 : refuge et solidarité", Migrance (special issue edited by Max Lagarrigue), Paris, 2000.
- "L'affaire du Fau (mai 1944-1952)", Montauban, Arkheia, 2000.
- "Itinéraire d'un cadre en marge : Renaud Jean, 1939-1941", Communisme, Paris, L'Âge d'Homme, 1999.
- "Un communisme rural ? L'exemple lot-et-garonnais durant les années trente", Éditions les Amis du Vieux Nérac, Toulouse, 1998.
- "Le PCF dans le Sud-Ouest : Centre et Périphérie", Communisme, Paris, L'Âge d'Homme, 1998.
- "Le PCF de la France rurale des années trente à la Guerre froide (1930-1961) : l'exemple du Sud-ouest", Revue des Archives en Limousin, issue 12, Brive, 1998.
- "La Confédération paysanne des Paysans Travailleurs (CGPT). Émergences, actions et difficultés d'un syndicalisme de 'classe' dans les années trente", Le Festin, issue 25, Bordeaux, 1998.

==== Essays ====
- "Les causes noires", Le Meilleur des mondes, issue 2, Denoël, 2007.
- "D'un totalitarisme à un autre… Les liaisons dangereuses de la Ligue des Droits de l'homme", Le Meilleur des mondes, issue 1, Denoël, 2006.
- "Pauvre Voltaire : le cas Thierry Meyssan", Le Meilleur des mondes, issue 1, Denoël, 2006.
