= Maglić, Serbia =

Maglić Маглић (Serbian) Báčsky Maglič (Slovak)
- Village (Selo)
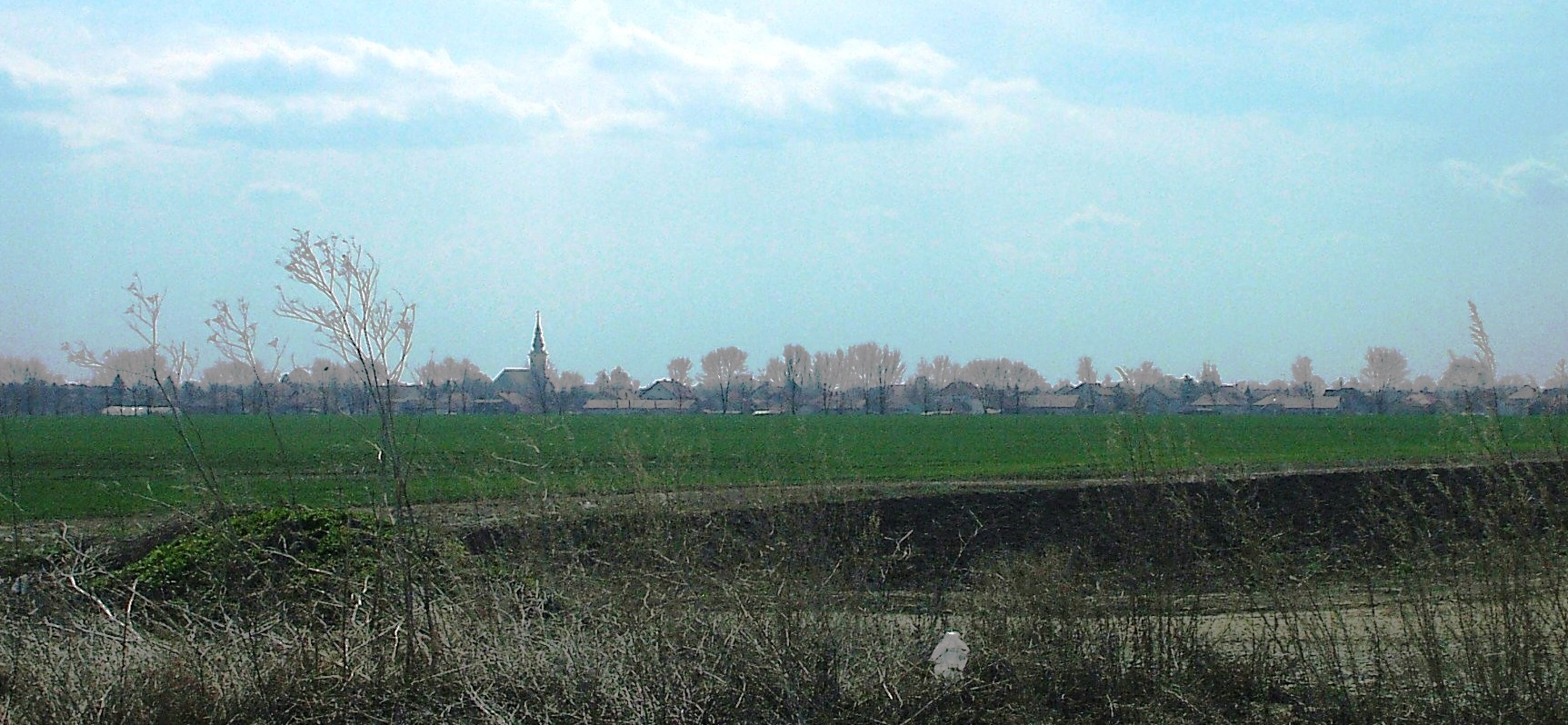

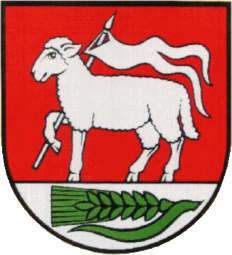
- Coat of arms

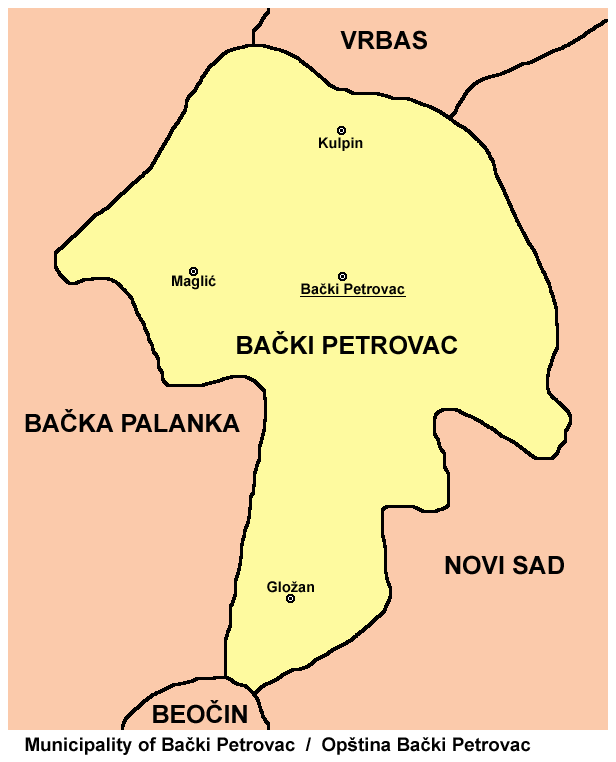
- Map of the Bački Petrovac municipality, showing the location of Maglić

- Location within Vojvodina Location within Serbia Location within Europe
- Coordinates: 45°21′44″N 19°31′54″E
- Country: Serbia
- Province: Vojvodina
- Region: Bačka (Podunavlje)
- District: South Bačka
- Municipality: Bački Petrovac

Population (2002)
  - Total: 2,695
- Time zone: UTC+1 (CET)
  - Summer (DST): UTC+2 (CEST)
- Postal code: 21473
- Area code: +381 21
- Vehicle registration: NS

Maglić (Serbian Cyrillic: Маглић) or Bački Maglić (Бачки Маглић) is a village located in the Bački Petrovac municipality, in the South Bačka District of Serbia. It is situated in the Autonomous Province of Vojvodina. Of the 2,695 population (2002 census) of the village, 2,426 are ethnic Serbs.

== Name ==
In Serbian, the village is known as Maglić (Маглић), or formerly also "Bulkes" (Булкес) or "Buljkes" (Буљкес); in Croatian as Maglić; in Hungarian as Bulkeszi or Bulkesz; and in German as "Bulkes" (or Pfalzweiler).

== History ==
Before the World War II, the village was called Buljkes, and was inhabited chiefly by ethnic Germans, settled here around 1786, mostly from Baden-Württemberg. In 1944, many of the residents fled ahead of the advancing Russian and Partisan troops. Under the newly enacted AVNOJ laws, in December 1944 the remaining residents were forced to relocate to the newly established concentration camp at Bački Jarak and the village was abandoned.

In May 1945, 4,650 Greek refugees, mostly male members of ELAS, settled in the village with the help of Yugoslav government. From 1945 to 1948, it was a sui generis case of Greek extraterritorial jurisdiction. The Yugoslav conflict with the Informbiro saw the Greek community divided between loyalty to Yugoslavia and to the Comintern, and those who supported the latter left the country. The remaining also emigrated to Greek Macedonia eventually, with only a few remaining.

The final settlement of the village started in late 1949, and ended around 1953. Settlers, chiefly Serbs, came in several waves, from all over the Yugoslavia. The village took the current name in 1949, after the Maglić mountain in eastern Herzegovina. The name partly evocates the sentiment of some settlers from that area, and partly subsumes the multi-original nature of the villagers, as it lies on junction of Bosnia, Herzegovina and Montenegro.

== Historical population ==
Historical population
Year	Pop.	±%
1961	2,180	—
1971	2,226	+2.1%
1981	2,571	+15.5%
1991	2,732	+6.3%
2002	2,695	−1.4%

== Gallery ==
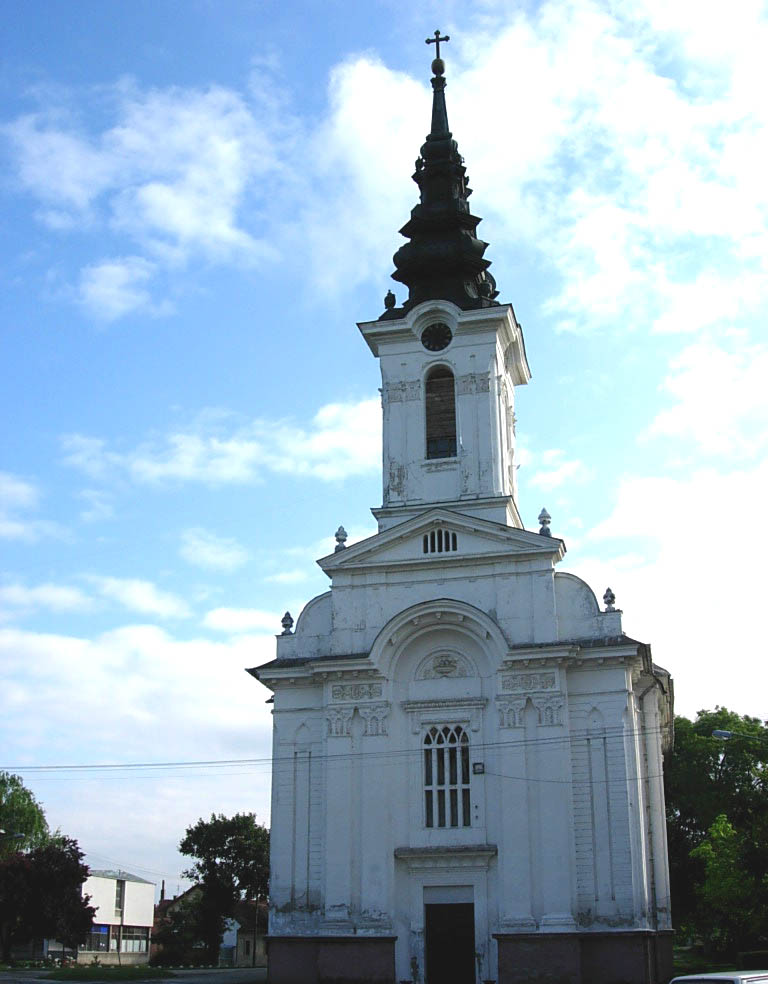
Old Evangelical Church.

== See also ==
- List of places in Serbia
- List of cities, towns and villages in Vojvodina
