= Armenia–Poland relations =

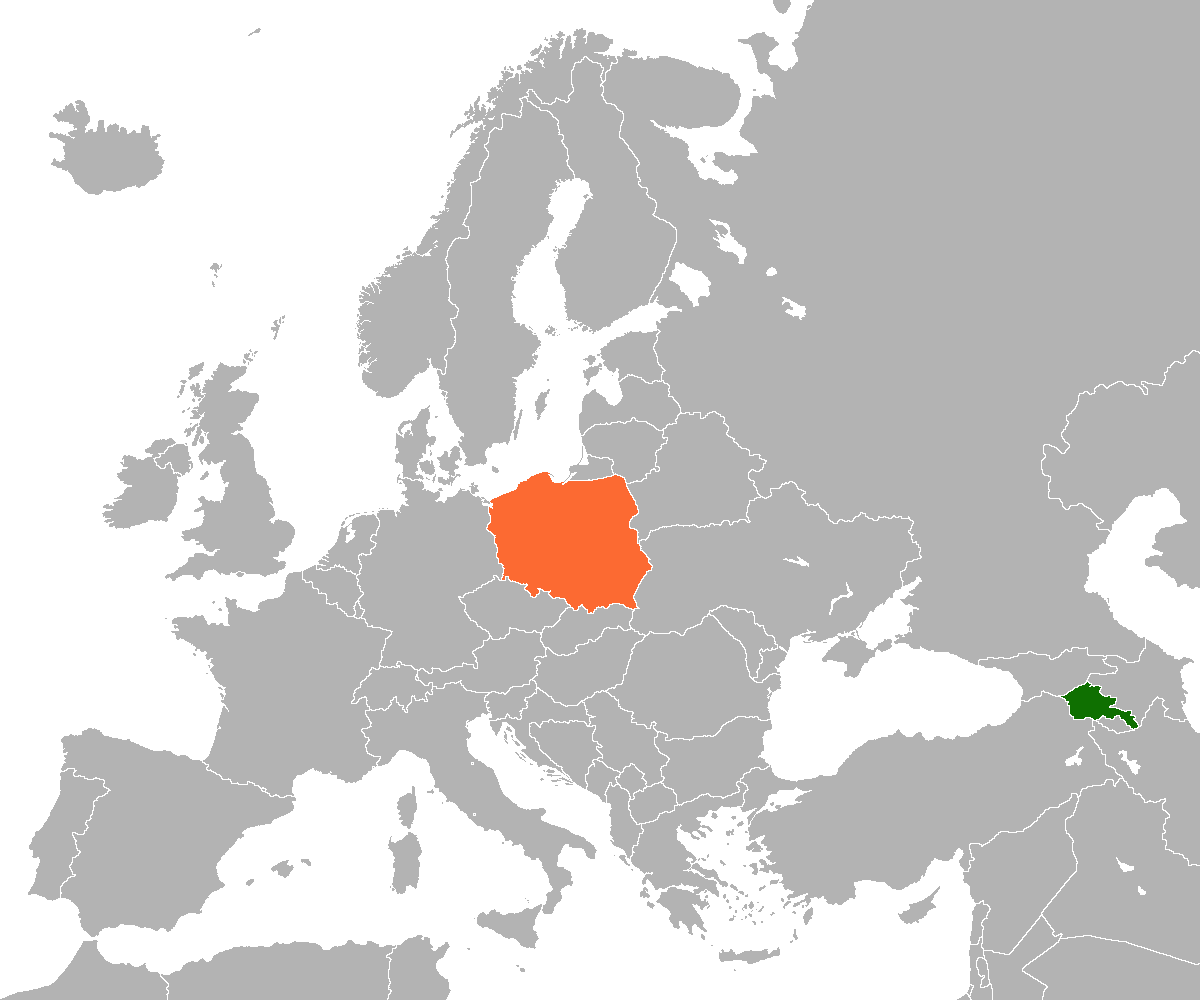

- Armenia: Poland

Diplomatic mission
- Embassy of Armenia, Warsaw: Embassy of Poland, Yerevan

Armenia–Poland relations are bilateral relations between Armenia and Poland. Both nations enjoy historically friendly relations, owing to their centuries-long cultural exchange and trade. Both countries are full members of the OSCE, the Council of Europe, the World Trade Organization and the United Nations.

== Historical relations ==
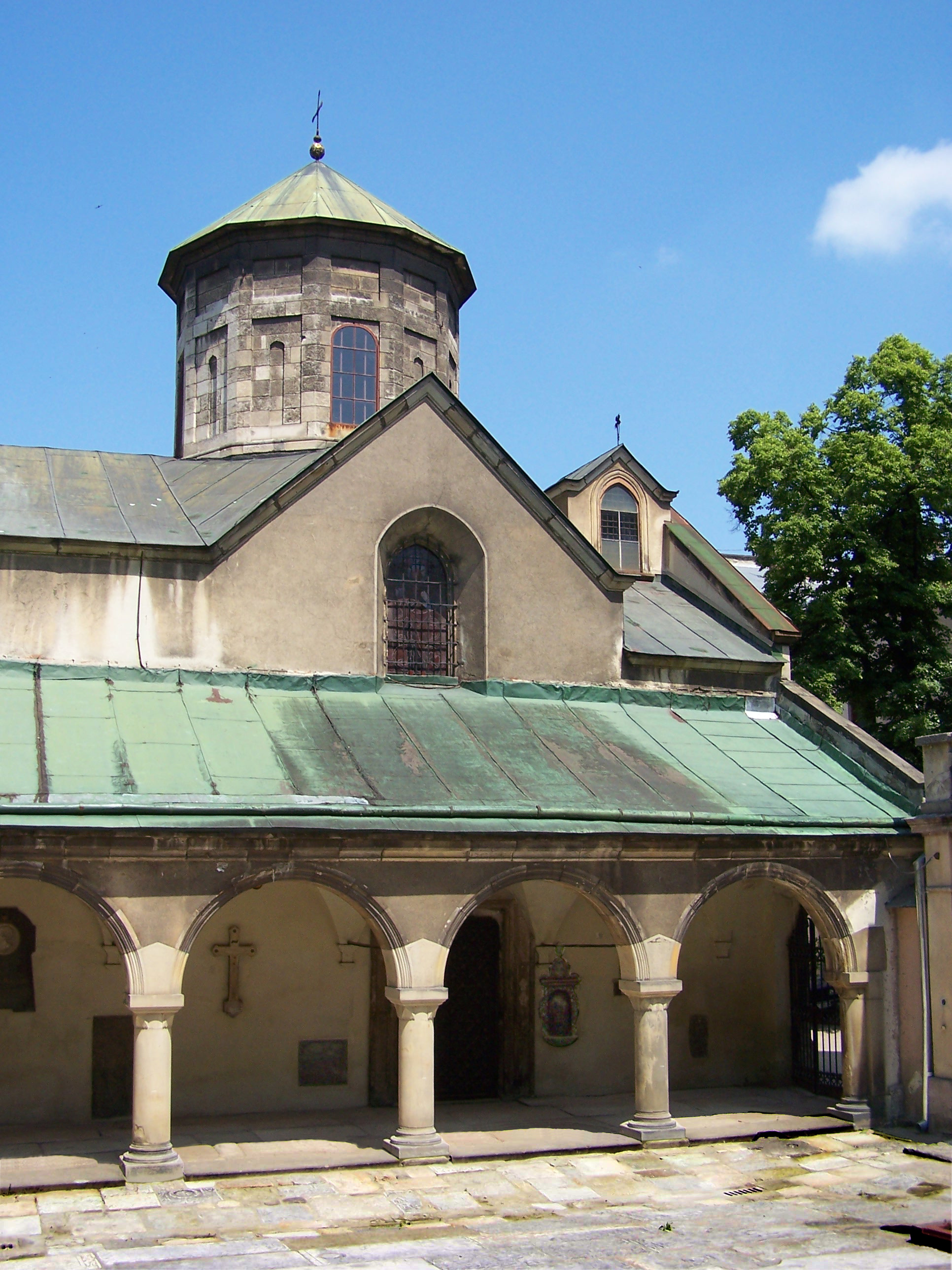
The Armenian Cathedral of Lwów in former eastern Poland (now Lviv) was for centuries the most important Armenian church in Poland

Historic contacts between Armenians and Poles date back to the Middle Ages. Since the 14th century, Armenians settled in the Kingdom of Poland, forming the historically significant Armenian-Polish community. Several vibrant Polish-Armenian communities existed especially in former southeastern Poland, the largest in Lwów, Kamieniec Podolski and briefly in Caffa, and others included Stanisławów, Jazłowiec, Buczacz, Zamość and Kuty. Numerous remnants of the community can still be found both in Poland and in former Polish eastern territories. The most known such sites include the Armenian Cathedral of Lwów (now Lviv) and the Renaissance Armenian Houses in Zamość. Polish merchants visited Armenia since the 16th century. In the 17th century, Polish King John III Sobieski planned to liberate Armenia from Ottoman rule, but his death thwarted these plans. A group of Armenians from Poland took part in the Syunik rebellion against Ottoman rule in Armenia in the 1720s.

After the Partitions of Poland carried out by Austria, Prussia and Russia in 1772–1795, and the annexation of Eastern Armenia by Russia in 1828, many Poles were either deported as political prisoners from the Russian Partition of Poland to Russian-controlled Armenian lands or were sent there after being conscripted to the Russian Army. Approximately 5,000 Poles lived in Armenia in the late 19th and early 20th century. Notable Polish communities existed in the cities of Yerevan, Gyumri, Kars and Ardahan.

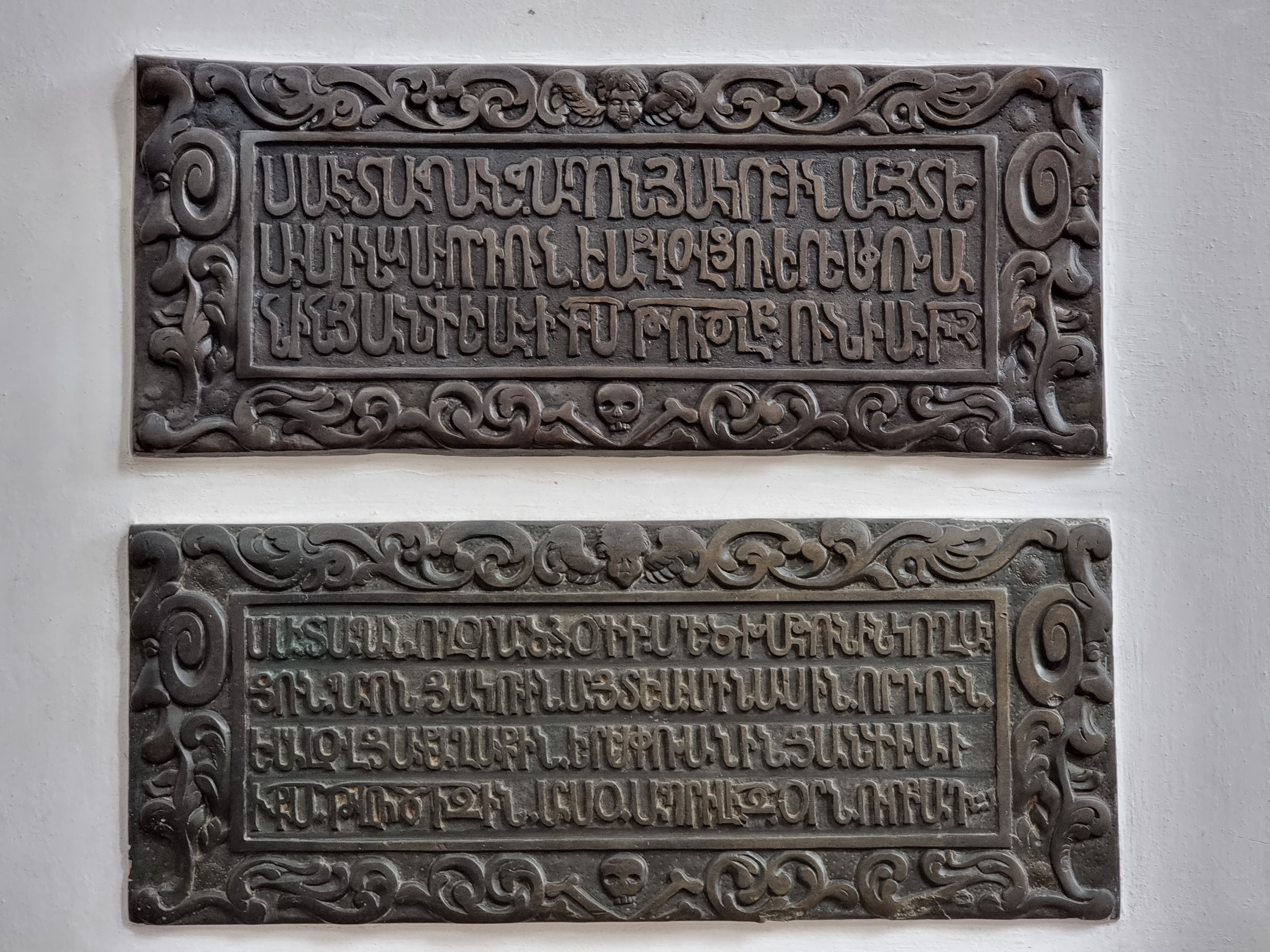
17th-century Armenian epitaphs in the St. Hyacinth's Church, Warsaw

Józef Pomiankowski, an ethnic Polish marshal of the Austrian Army (and later Polish General after the re-establishment of independent Poland), was one of the earliest figures to discover the intention of the Young Turks to exterminate the Armenians, and the Armenian genocide was strongly condemned by Józef himself. It was the tragic massacre that Polish lawyer Raphael Lemkin coined the word "genocide" in 1943.

Prior to the genocide, the Armenians were well-perceived by the Polish population, and several Polish famous figures have Armenian root, notably poets Juliusz Słowacki and Zbigniew Herbert.

Both Armenia and Poland regained independence in 1918. Poles were repatriated from Armenia to Poland since 1918. Polish navy officer Stanisław Korwin-Pawłowski started the creation of the Armenian Navy and founded a training center for the Armenian Navy. Poland strongly supported the re-establishment of independent Armenia. In 1919, Kazimierz Dłuski, one of the Polish delegates to the Paris Peace Conference, held talks with the Armenian delegation, and supported Woodrow Wilson's proposal to include Armenia in a United States mandate. Ignacy Jan Paderewski unequivocally advocated Armenia's independence and membership in the League of Nations at the League's meeting in Geneva. Both countries were shortly afterwards invaded by Soviet Russia. Poland successfully repelled the Russian invasion and secured its independence, but Armenia was conquered, which made it impossible to establish official diplomatic relations between the nations.

== Modern relations ==
Poland has recognized the Armenian genocide. At the height of the Cold War, both countries were communist states under Soviet domination as the Polish People's Republic and the Armenian SSR.

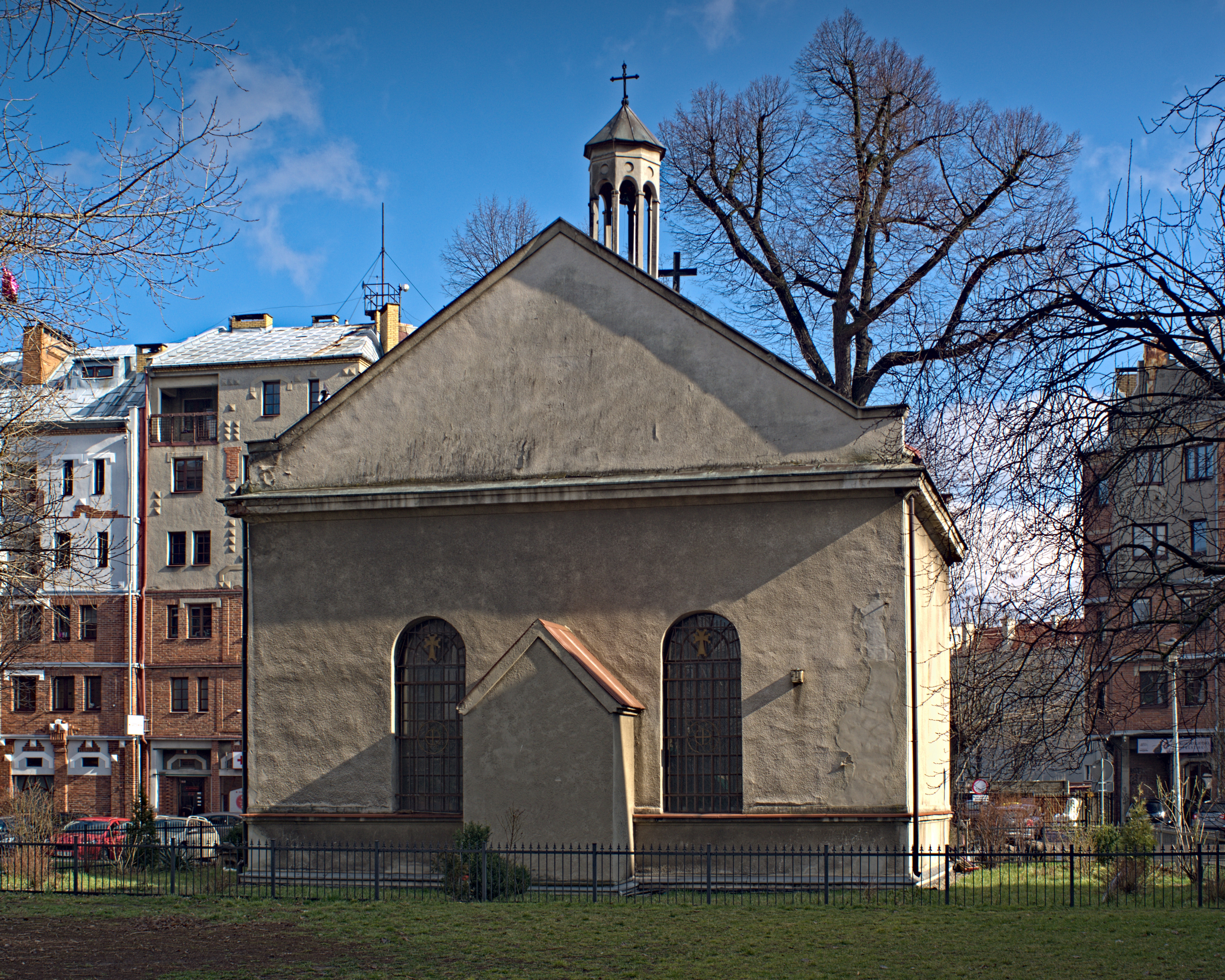
Armenian Catholic Holy Trinity church in Gliwice, Poland

Following the restoration of independence, several agreements between the two countries were signed, including a cultural cooperation agreement in 2000, a defense cooperation agreement in 2004, and an economic cooperation agreement in 2010.

Polish companies like Lubawa SA also cooperate with the Armenian government. Lubawa-Armenia and the Armenian ministry of defense successfully set up a military industry enterprise, capable of supplying ballistic vests and helmets, vehicle decoys, and tents to the Armenian Armed Forces, and opening the gateway for Polish companies to assist in getting access to Eurasian markets.

Armenia's main import from Poland are cherries.

Poland and Poles are viewed positively in Armenia, mainly due to close historic relations.

The glorification of Ramil Safarov, who had murdered Armenian military personnel Gurgen Margaryan, had been criticized in Poland, and Poland also had some reservations toward Hungary, a long time traditional ally of Poland, for the releasing of Ramil Safarov.

In 2017, the Senate of Poland adopted a resolution commemorating the 650th anniversary of the foundation of the Polish-Armenian community and expressed gratitude for its contribution to Polish culture and history. Between 2018–2023, khachkars commemorating Armenian-Polish friendship were unveiled in Zamość, Szczecinek, and Zabrze in Poland. In 2021, a khachkar commemorating Armenian-Polish friendship and Pope John Paul II was unveiled in Yerevan.

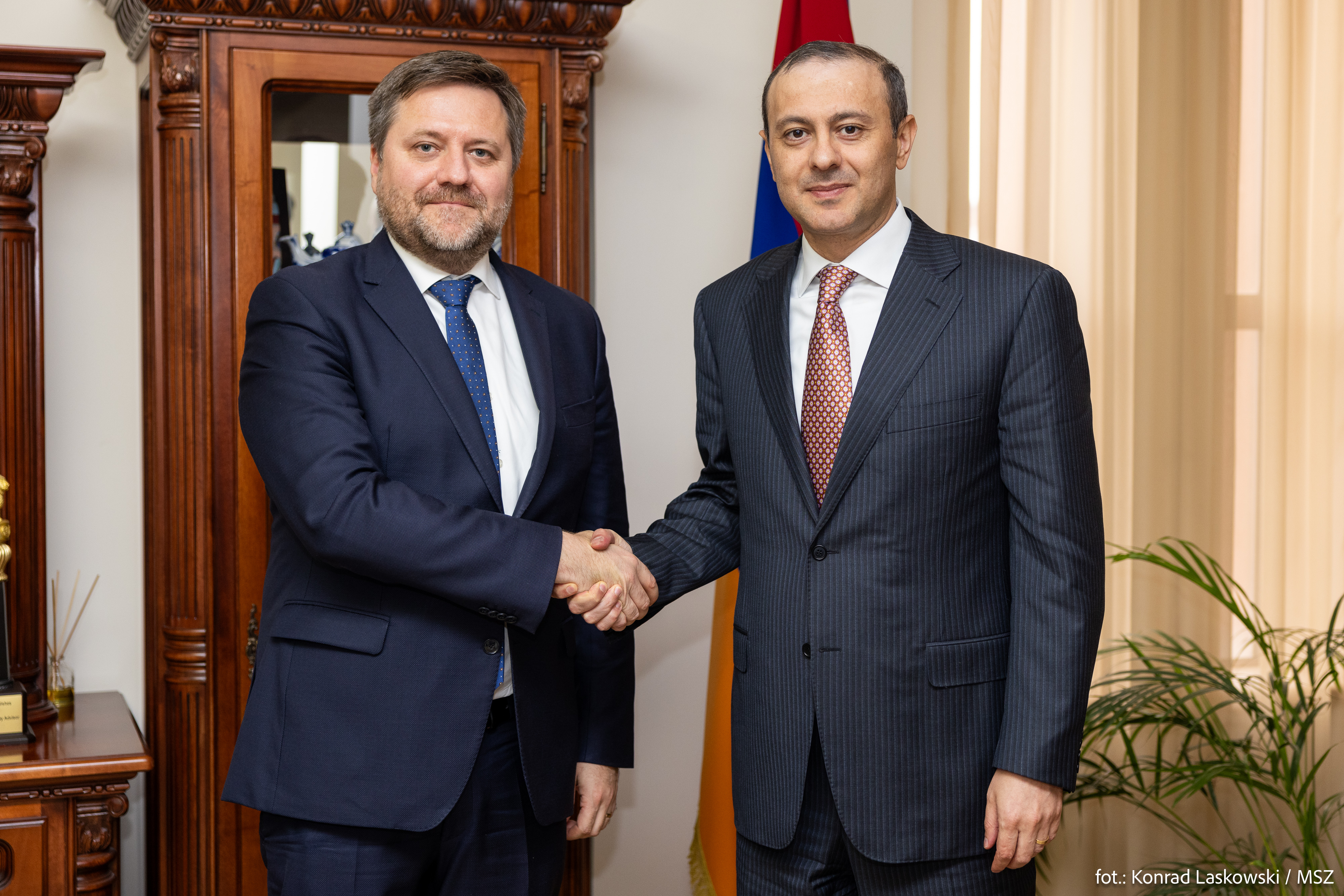
Undersecretary of State at the Ministry of Foreign Affairs of Poland Wojciech Gerwel and Secretary of the Security Council of Armenia Armen Grigoryan in 2023

In June 2020, Poland donated medical items, such as face masks, face shields and hand and face sanitizers, to Armenia, following the outbreak of the COVID-19 pandemic in Armenia. In June 2021, Poland donated medical supplies to Armenia to help fight the pandemic, and in November 2021, Poland donated over 200,000 COVID-19 vaccines to Armenia.

In February 2026, Poland and Armenia signed an agreement on military-technical cooperation between their respective Ministries of Defense of Poland and Armenia.

=== Armenian genocide recognition ===
In 2005, Poland officially recognized the Armenian genocide.

=== Nagorno-Karabakh conflict ===
Poland has refrained from taking side and had instead urged Armenia and Azerbaijan to find the way to solve the problem. Following the 2020 Nagorno-Karabakh conflict, Armenians in Poland demonstrated in Warsaw demanding Polish President Andrzej Duda to take a firmer hand against Turkey and Azerbaijan. In April 2021, Poland sent 3 tons of humanitarian aid to Armenia for the displaced citizens of Artsakh residing in Armenia. On 8 August 2025, Poland welcomed the peace agreement signed between Armenia and Azerbaijan and announced its full support for the normalization process of relations between Armenia and Azerbaijan.

== Resident diplomatic missions ==
- Armenia has an embassy in Warsaw.
- Poland has an embassy in Yerevan.
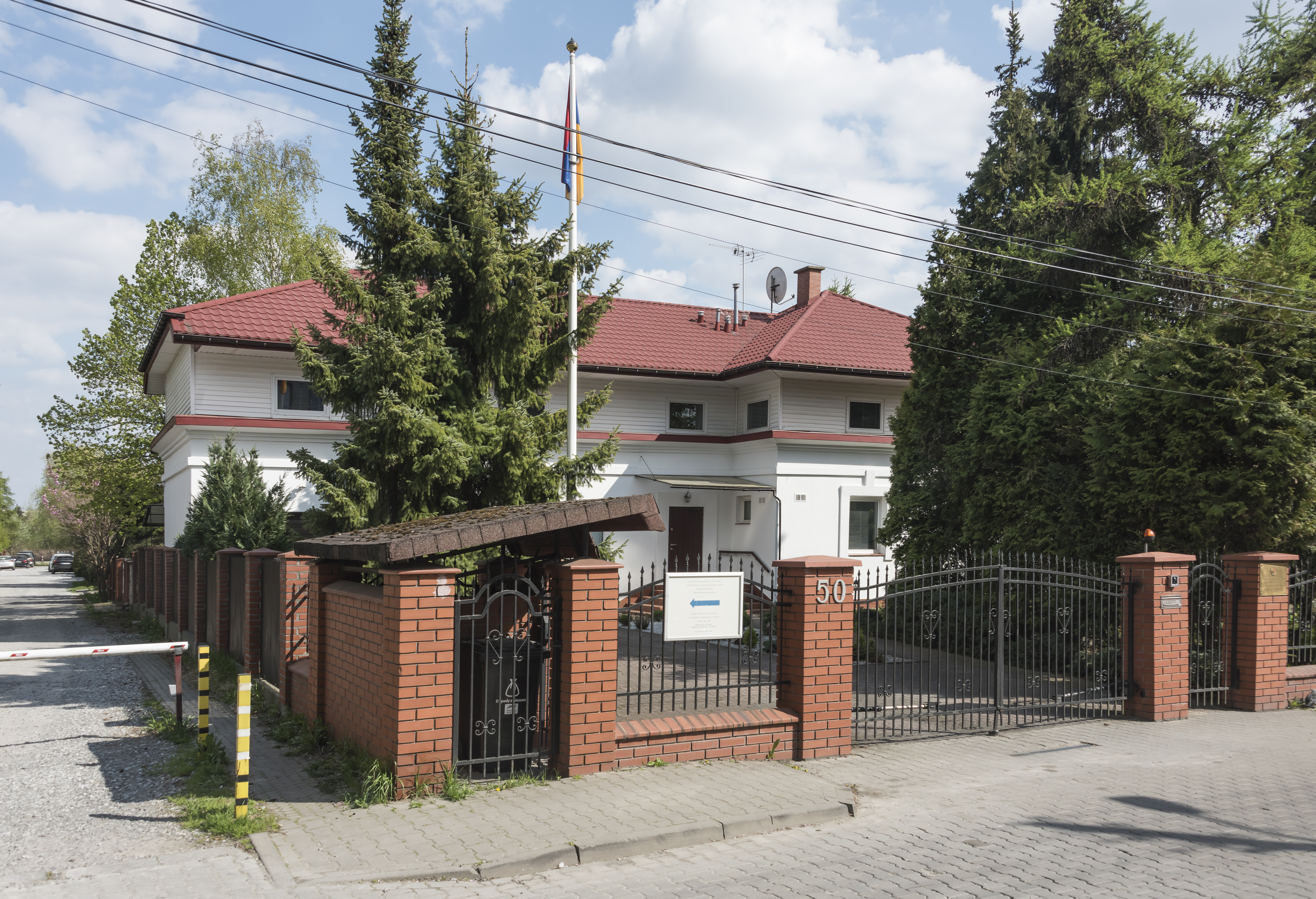
Embassy of Armenia in Warsaw

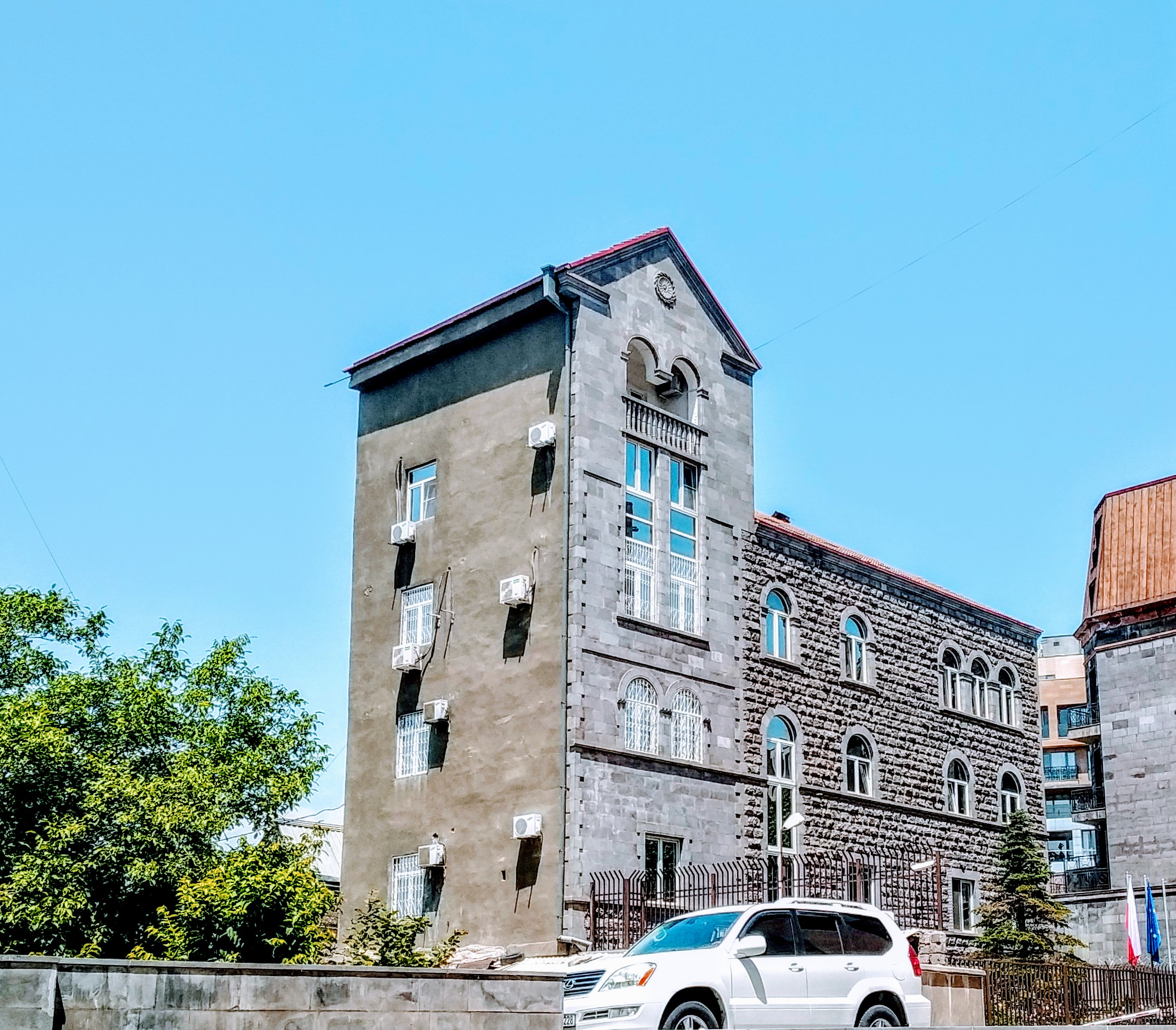
Embassy of Poland in Yerevan

== Honorary consulates ==
There are honorary consulates of Armenia in Łódź, Poznań and Zabrze.

== See also ==
- Foreign relations of Armenia
- Foreign relations of Poland
- Armenia-NATO relations
- Armenia-EU relations
  - Accession of Armenia to the EU
- Armenians in Poland
- Poles in Armenia

== Bibliography ==
- Stopka, Krzysztof (2000). Ormianie w Polsce dawnej i dzisiejszej (in Polish). Kraków: Księgarnia Akademicka. ISBN 83-7188-325-0.
