= Dominique Girard =

Dominique Girard may refer to:

- Dominique Girard (diplomat), French ambassador to India
- Dominique Girard (garden designer) (1680–1738), landscape architect and engineer
