= Poland–Vietnam relations =

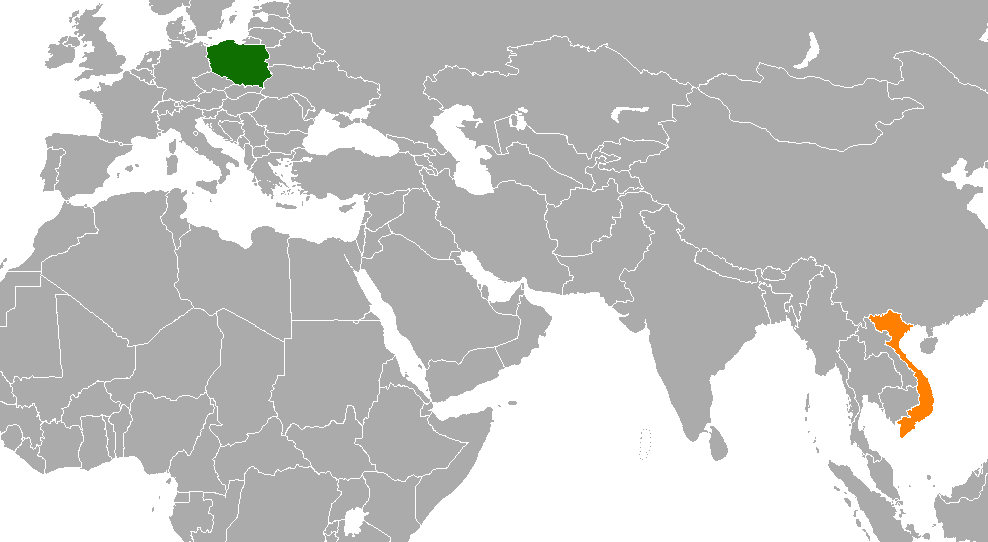
- Poland: Vietnam

Poland–Vietnam relations are the current and historical relations between Poland and Vietnam. Poland has an embassy in Hanoi and Vietnam has an embassy in Warsaw.

The relationship between these two nations can be described as special because they both share historical parallels, although they are also culturally different from one another and geographically very far apart. Both peoples experienced long struggles for national liberation, living in divided countries, near the armies of occupying forces, and were later brought further together as part of the Eastern Bloc.

Both Poland and Vietnam have had a long history of wars and uprisings against powerful foreign invaders such as Russia and Germany for the Polish, China and Japan for the Vietnamese. These shared historical struggles are mentioned in the Vietnamese poem My dear, Poland by the Vietnamese poet Tố Hữu.

== History ==
Although the two nations at first glance seem to have little in common due to being located so far from each other geographically, they nevertheless share historical parallels. Both Poland and Vietnam were given credit for having repelled the invasions from two of the most powerful empires in history; Poland repelled an invasion of the Ottoman Empire and Vietnam pushed back attacks from the Mongol Empire.

Both nations also share some commonalities in how brutally they were treated by invading forces in the 19th and 20th centuries. In their long historical struggles for independence, the Poles and the Vietnamese had to fight against larger empires, with Poland rising up against Russia and Germany while Vietnam fought China and France. Each country frequently suffered destruction and devastation at the hands of invading armies. In the first half of the 20th century, both nations were also occupied by powerful colonisers. During World War II, Poland was occupied by Nazi Germany and the Soviet Union, whereas Vietnam was occupied by Vichy France and the Japanese Empire. Much of the Polish and Vietnamese population became victims of massacres launched by these imperial forces, with many war crimes in German-occupied Poland and French war crimes in colonial Vietnam.

Similarly, both nations resisted via the use of guerrilla warfare and resistance movements. Poland launched the Warsaw Uprising against the German occupation and the Vietnamese started the August Revolution to fight against the colonial rule of the French and the Japanese. As such, Vietnam received much sympathy from Polish co-workers when they arrived in North Vietnam in the 1960s and the Vietnamese immigrants in Poland also perceived Poland in a similar manner because of their historical parallels. When Vietnam was subjected to global condemnations and embargoes that were raised by the United States and China, both the Polish People's Republic government and the Solidarity movement expressed solidarity with Vietnam's fight against the Khmer Rouge in Cambodia. It was an act that led to the deployment of Polish troops in Cambodia under the UN mission to help stabilise the political situation in Cambodia.

In 1946, the future founder of Israel, a Polish Jew, David Ben-Gurion, met Hồ Chí Minh in Paris. His desire to establish Israel and the historical impression from Hồ to Poland was considered as the first unofficial tie between Vietnam and Poland.

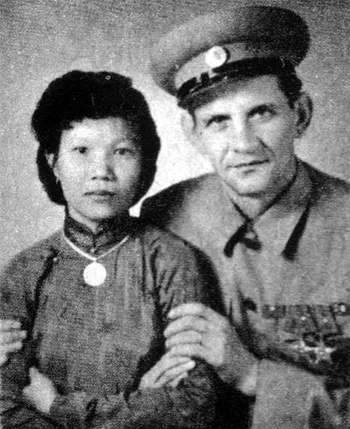
Nguyễn Thị Phượng and Stefan Kubiak

Some Poles have fought for Vietnam's independence, with the most well-known and only historically confirmed example being Stefan Kubiak – a Polish soldier of the People's Army of Vietnam, who became a decorated veteran due to his exploits during the First Indochina War and was eventually adopted by Hồ Chí Minh under the name "Hồ Chí Toán". Following the Vietnamese victory over the French in 1954, Kubiak settled in the capital of Hà Nội, married a Vietnamese woman called Nguyễn Thị Phượng and started a family with her. A celebrated war hero by the time of the conflict with the US, he eventually succumbed to injuries sustained during his years as a combatant and died after suffering from malaria.

Official diplomatic relations between the states of Poland and Vietnam were established in 1950. Janusz Lewandowski, representative of the Polish delegation during the Geneva Accords at 1954, had protested the idea of separating Vietnam into two parts that was proposed by the Government of the newly-established People's Republic of China. To monitor the Geneva Accords, the International Control Commission (ICC) consisting of diplomats and soldiers from Poland, India, and Canada was set up. The chairman of the ICC was always Indian; while the Canadians were expected to support South Vietnam, the Poles were expected to support North Vietnam. In practice, the ICC did not work as expected, with the Indian delegation often taking a more pro-North position than the Polish delegation, who contrary to expectations proved to be more neutral. Poland–Vietnam relations grew from the student exchange programmes that ran from the 1950s to the 1980s, during which time both Poland and Vietnam were one-party states and members of the Eastern Bloc under Soviet Russian influence. Both states were members of Comecon.

During the Vietnam War, Polish diplomats in North Vietnam collaborated with Italian diplomats in South Vietnam in order to seek peace and end the Vietnam War. The first effort was the "Maneli Affair" of 1963, named after the Polish commissioner on the ICC, Mieczysław Maneli. The "Maneli Affair" involved a proposal to end the war and ultimately set up a federation of North Vietnam and South Vietnam. The second effort of 1966 was known as Operation Marigold. In Marigold, Janusz Lewandowski of the ICC met with the American ambassador to South Vietnam, Henry Cabot Lodge Jr., presenting an offer on behalf of North Vietnam to open peace talks provided the Americans stopped bombing North Vietnam first.

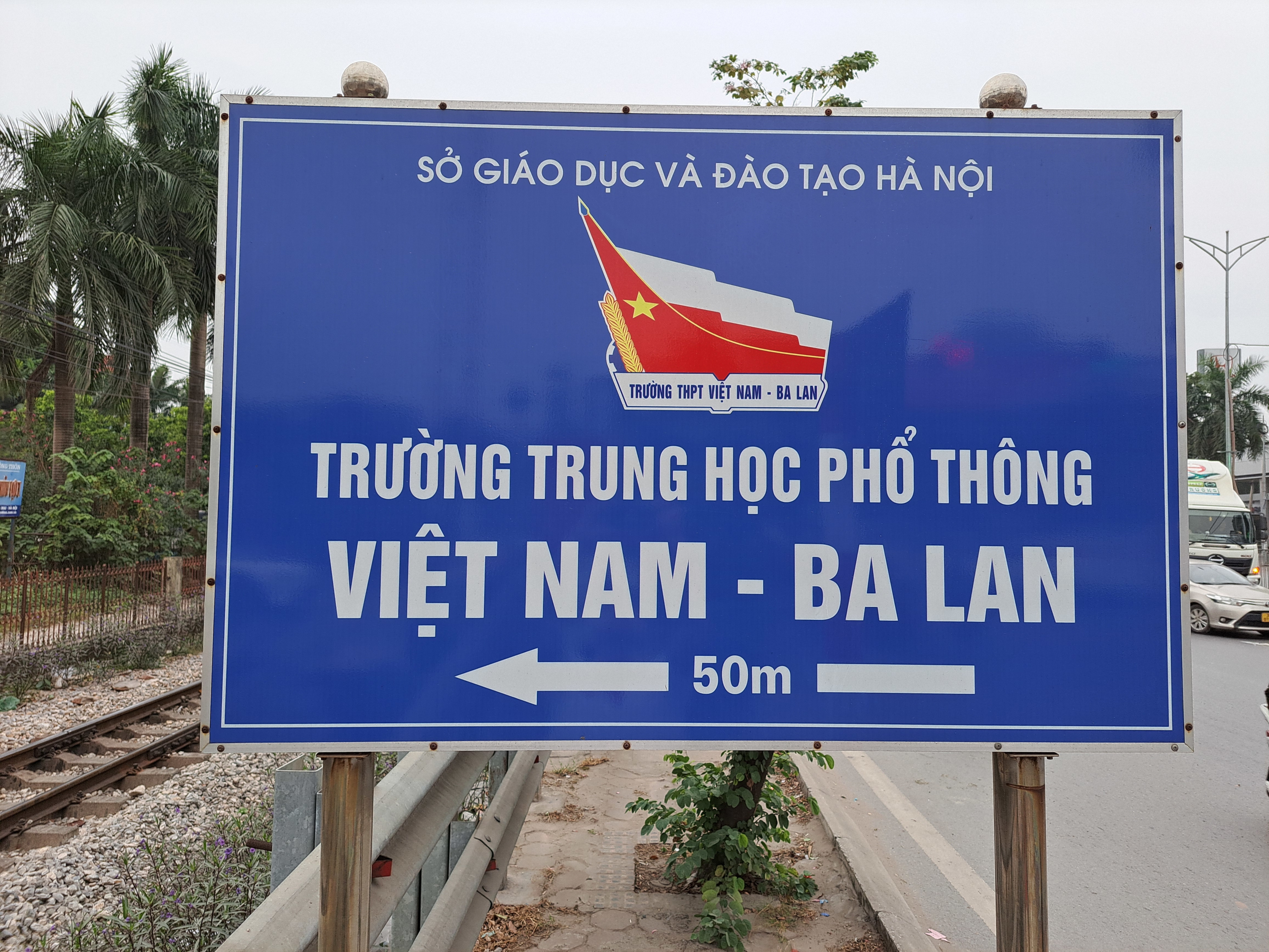
Vietnam-Poland High School in Hanoi

The Vietnam-Poland High School in the Hoàng Mai district of Hà Nội was opened in 1960 and operates under its current name since 1962, when it was paired with a primary school in Pruszków near the Polish capital of Warsaw. Since the 1960s, the Vietnam-Poland High School has sent many of its pupils to Poland for summer camps and to visit the country. Throughout the 20th century and into the 21st, even after the transformation of the Polish People's Republic into the Third Polish Republic, the Vietnamese school continues to take part in various international programmes and cooperates with Polish educational organisations.

Many Vietnamese university students took part in student exchanges with Poland; after returning to their home country, Vietnamese graduates of Polish universities often became leading specialists in key areas of the country's developing economy, including mining and shipbuilding. In the 1980s, the Vietnamese-Polish Friendship Hospital was built in Vinh, Vietnam with Poland's help. The hospital continues to be supported by Poland as it donates medical equipment and provides professional courses for the hospital's Vietnamese doctors. Thanks to Vietnamese graduates of Polish universities, the works of renowned Polish writers, such as Henryk Sienkiewicz, Adam Mickiewicz, Bolesław Prus, Ryszard Kapuściński, and Olga Tokarczuk have been translated into Vietnamese.

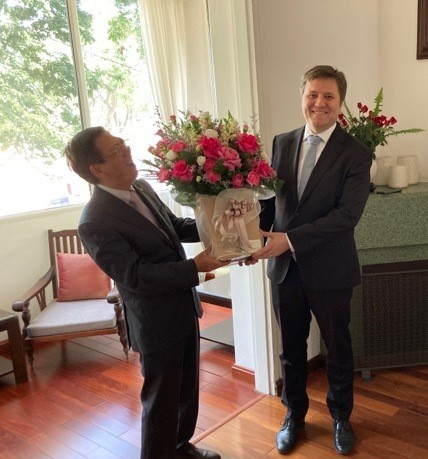
Vietnamese politician Nguyễn Thế Thảo and Poland's ambassador to Vietnam Wojciech Gerwel in Hanoi, 2020

In 2017, an office of the Polish Investment and Trade Agency was opened in Ho Chi Minh City in the presence of Polish President Andrzej Duda. As of 2020, Vietnam was Poland's largest trading partner among the ASEAN countries. On 1 August 2020, the European Union–Vietnam Free Trade Agreement came into force, which eliminated 99% of tariffs in trade between Vietnam and EU countries, including Poland.

Following the outbreak of the COVID-19 pandemic in Poland, in March 2020, Vietnam aided Poland by sending 4,000 COVID-19 testing kits, as well as medical gowns and gloves for Polish medics. The aid was organised by the Vietnamese community in Poland. In August 2021, Poland donated over 500,000 COVID-19 vaccines to Vietnam. In September 2021, over 8 tons of medical equipment arrived from Poland to Vietnam, and in October 2021, Poland donated another over 880,000 vaccines. During a meeting with Poland's ambassador to Vietnam Wojciech Gerwel, Vietnamese Foreign Minister Bùi Thanh Sơn expressed gratitude for the donation, also stressing the long-standing traditional friendship between the nations. Vietnam is the first Southeast Asian country to receive such aid from Poland.

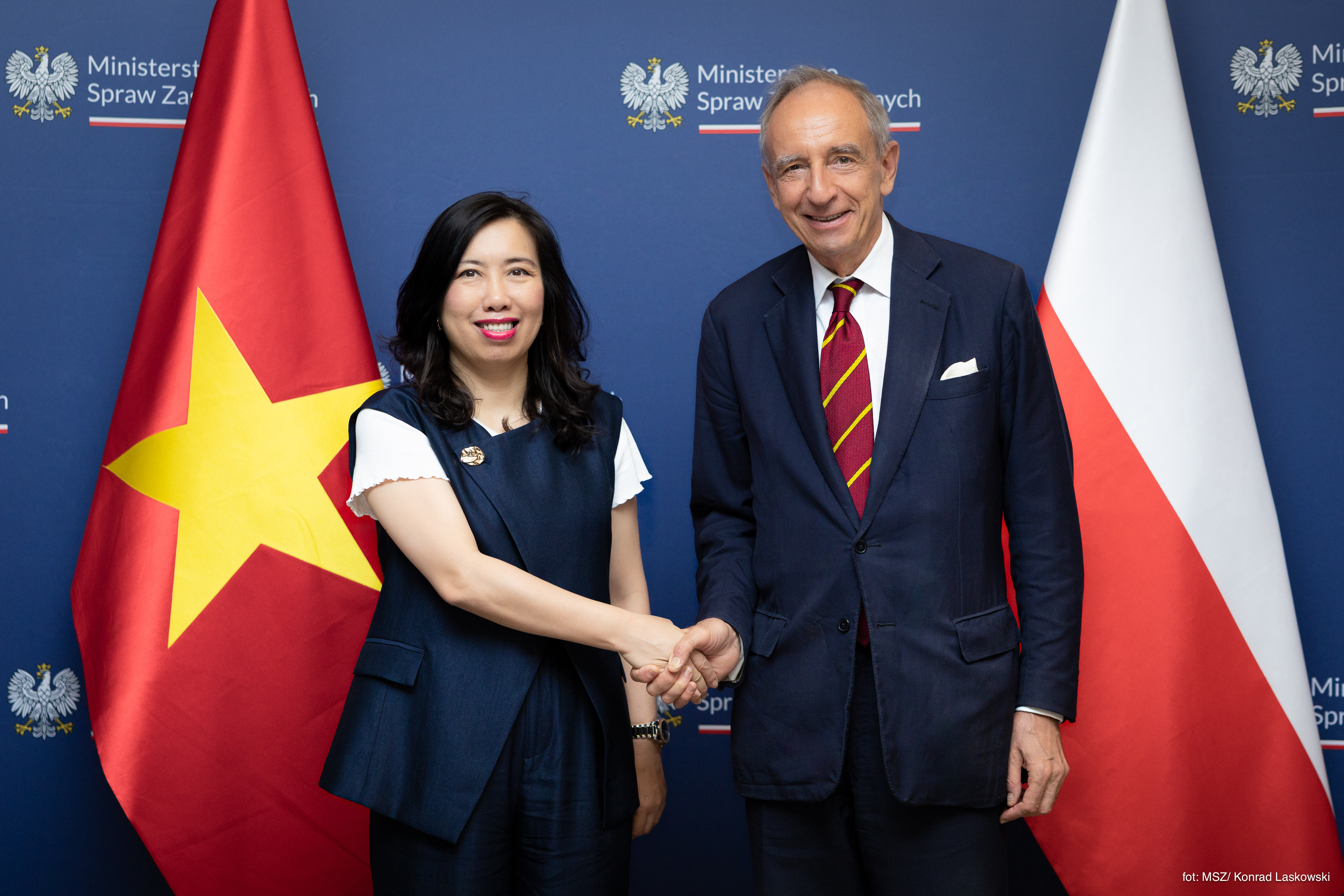
Deputy Foreign Minister of Vietnam Lê Thị Thu Hằng and Secretary of State at the Ministry of Foreign Affairs of Poland Władysław Teofil Bartoszewski in Warsaw in 2025

In January 2025, Vietnamese prime minister Phạm Minh Chính attended a conference in Warsaw, where he announced that Polish citizens wishing to visit Vietnam for up to 45 days would no longer need to apply for a visa from March of the same year. Both Chính and Polish prime minister Donald Tusk spoke about the historical and ongoing friendly relations between their two countries, as well as the desire for continued cooperation to bring them even closer together economically and in other aspects.

=== Polish Catholic influence in Vietnam ===
Throughout the history of their relations, Poland has played both an unofficial and official role on the growth and buildup of Roman Catholicism in Vietnam, since Roman Catholicism is the major religion in Poland. In the 17th century, Polish Catholic Jesuit, Wojciech Męciński, visited Vietnam in a tour through Asia, and documented his travels in Vietnam as the first Polish official record of the country.

Pope John Paul II, who was Polish, had canonised all Vietnamese Catholics who died from 1533 to protect Christianity as Vietnamese Martyrs in 1988. The Polish Pope opted an open opportunity to establish relations with Vietnam and had recognised the importance of Our Lady of La Vang, a Marian apparition in La Vang. He also expressed desire to rebuild the La Vang Basilica in commemoration of the 200th anniversary of the first vision. His message was instrumental, leading to the Government of Vietnam to acknowledge the importance of La Vang in the Christian history of Vietnam. The Polish Pope remained a revered figure among the Vietnamese, both Catholics and non-Catholics, even when he died in 2005. John Paul II was also seen as having laid the framework for the normalisation of relations between the Holy See and Vietnam.

Archbishop Marek Zalewski, who is the second Vatican non-residential representative to Vietnam, is from Poland. He played a minor role, yet facilitated an unofficial link on the ongoing normalisation in Holy See–Vietnam relations, which was seen with the direct result of the Vatican's decision to establish a permanent representative in Vietnam and accepted by the Vietnamese regime, moving further to possible future establishment of official ties between the two entities and lax of suppression on Catholicism in Vietnam by the Vietnamese government.

== Cultural relations ==
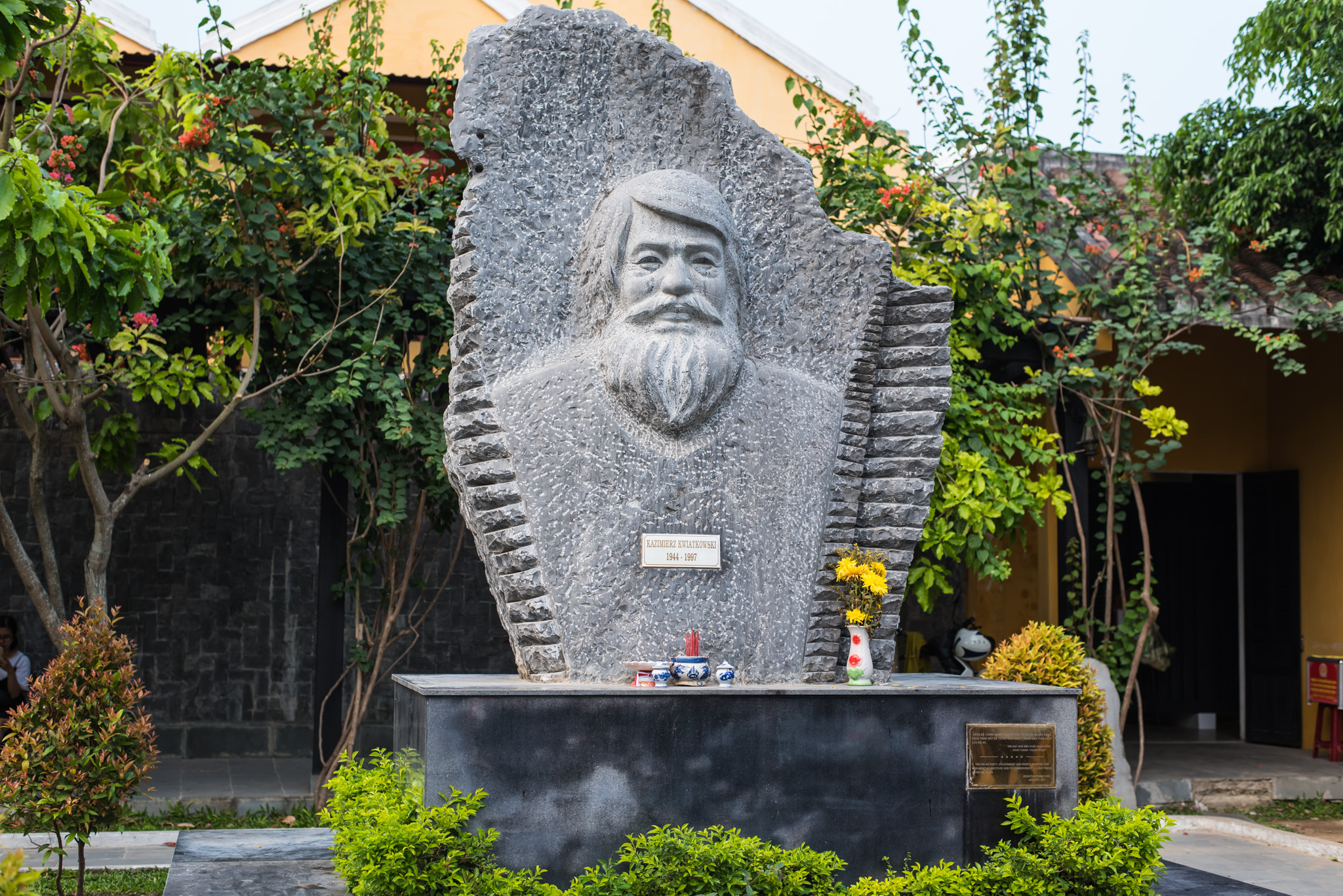
Monument of Polish architect Kazimierz Kwiatkowski in Hoi An, Vietnam

The 10th-Anniversary Stadium of Warsaw has been called the centre of the Vietnamese-Polish community in Poland. The Vietnamese community is also served by a number of non-governmental organisations, run by the community itself.

The Vietnamese-Polish Friendship High School in Hanoi was named in honour of the relationship between Vietnam and Poland, and Poland donated equipment to the school several times. Also in Hanoi, the Marie Curie High School was named in honour of the famous Polish scientist. There is a statue of Kazimierz Kwiatkowski in the city of Hội An, which he helped to revive.

== State visits ==
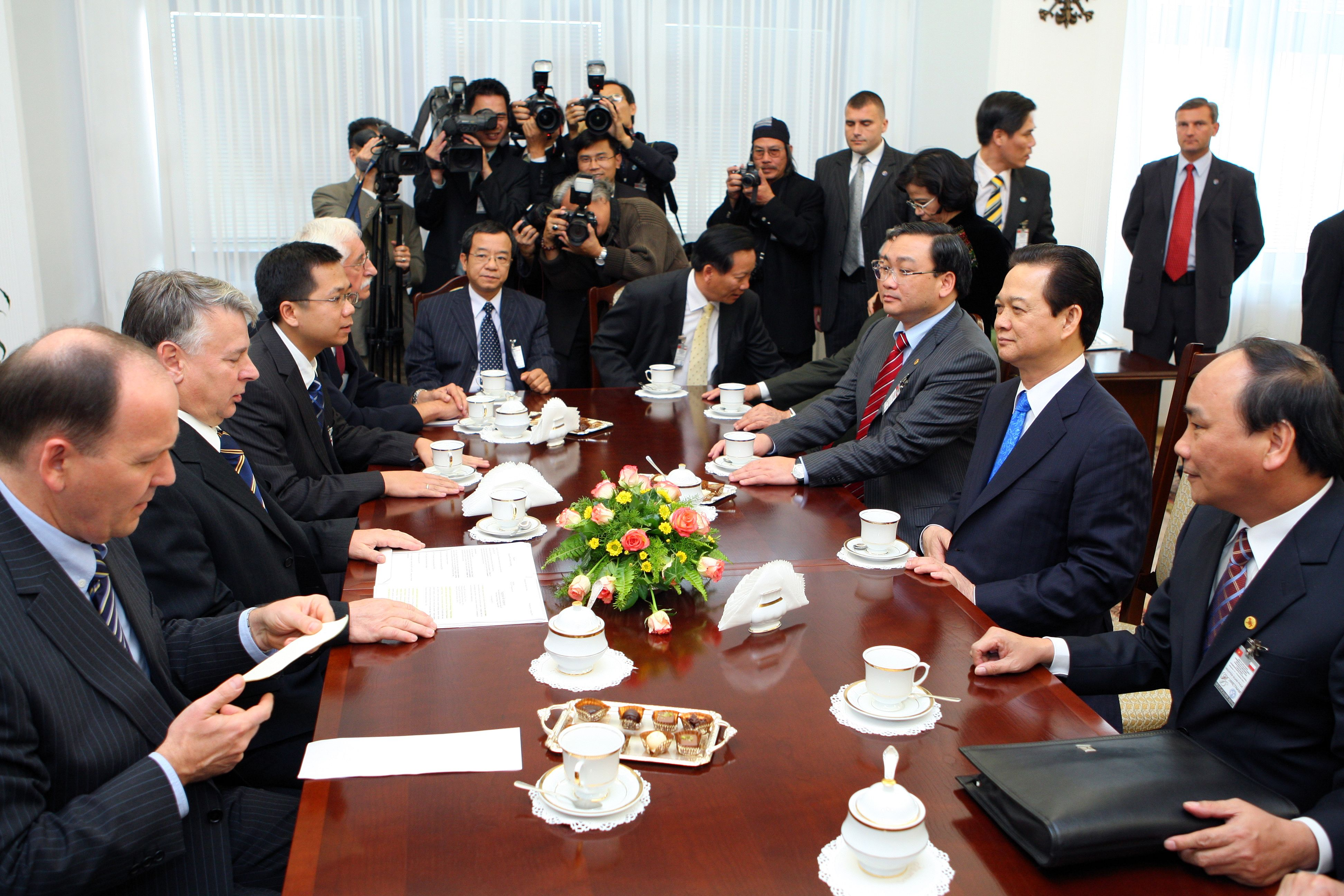
Visit of Vietnamese Prime Minister Nguyễn Tấn Dũng in the Senate of Poland in 2007

From Poland to Vietnam:

- President Aleksander Kwaśniewski in 1999
- Prime Minister Marek Belka in 2005
- President Andrzej Duda in 2017

From Vietnam to Poland:

- Prime Minister in 1997
- President in 2003
- Prime Minister in 2007
- Prime Minister Phạm Minh Chính in 2025

== Contributions and Development Assistance ==
Kazimierz Kwiatkowski contributed immensely to the restoration of the historic city of Hội An, the Mỹ Sơn Sanctuary, and the Complex of Huế Monuments. His contributions led to all three sites being recognised as World Heritage Sites by UNESCO, also making Hội An one of the most popular tourist attractions in the world. His statue can be found in the city of Hội An.

In 2015, Poland offered to loan Vietnam EUR 250 million as a form of official development assistance. The financial co-operation framework agreement was eventually signed between the two countries in 2017. In the same year, Adamed Group made the largest direct Polish investment in Vietnam by acquiring a controlling stake in Davipharm Co.

== Migration ==
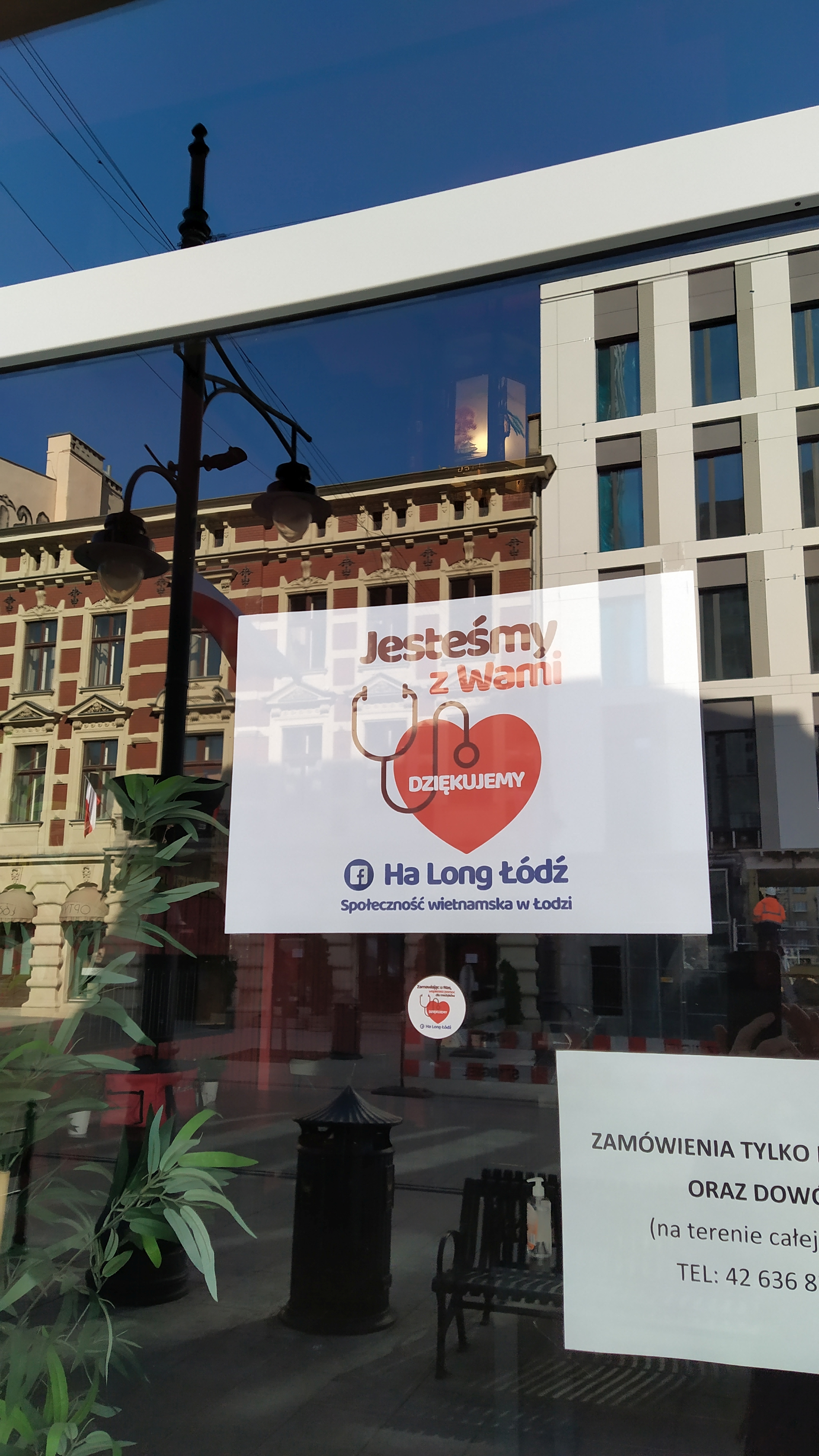
Vietnamese minority in Łódź thanks Polish medics during the COVID-19 pandemic

There has been significant migration of Vietnamese people to Poland estimated to be between 30,000 and 40,000 forming the largest non European migrant community in Poland.

Following the Polish transition to a capitalist economy in 1990, and the reforms of Vietnam at 1986, Poland became a more attractive immigration destination for the Vietnamese people, in particular, small entrepreneurs; this triggered a second, larger wave of Vietnamese immigrants to Poland. Many began as vendors in the open air market bazaar at the 10th-Anniversary Stadium selling clothes or cheap food; as of 2005, there were between 1,100 and 1,200 Vietnamese-owned stands in the area. As of 2002 in Warsaw there were an estimated 500 Vietnamese restaurants, mostly serving fast food.

== Resident diplomatic missions ==
- Poland has an embassy in Hanoi.
- Vietnam has an embassy in Warsaw.
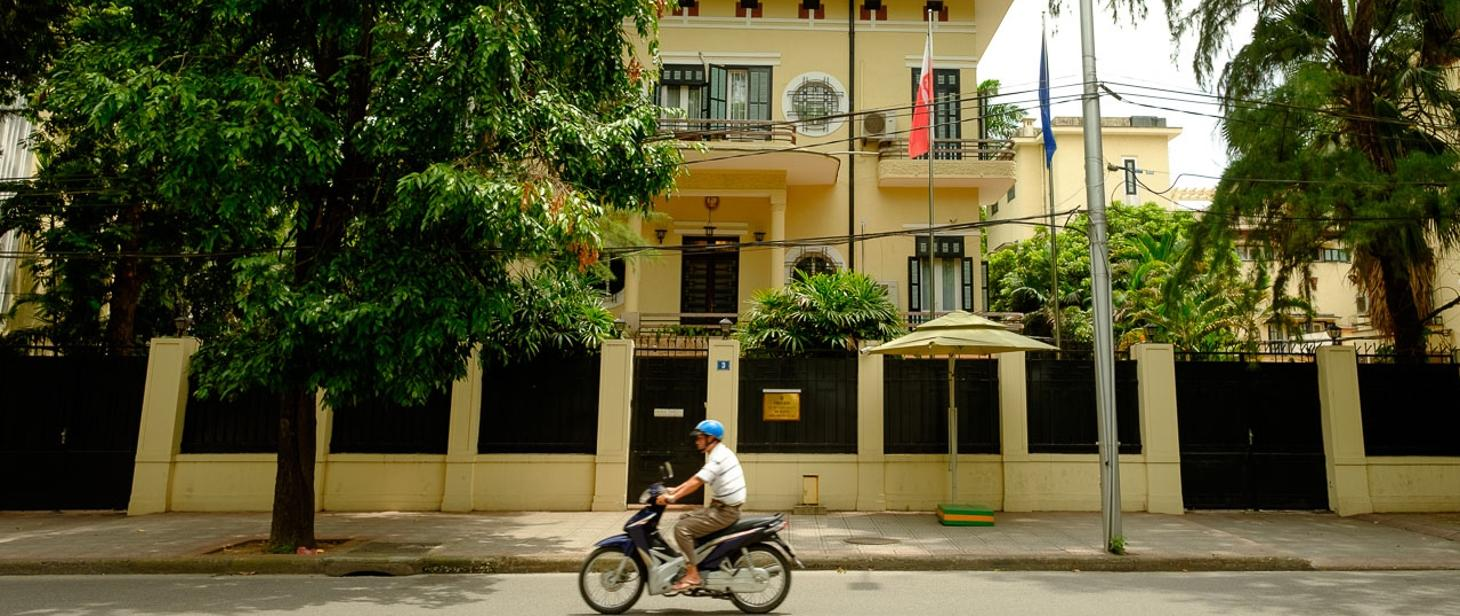
Embassy of Poland in Hanoi

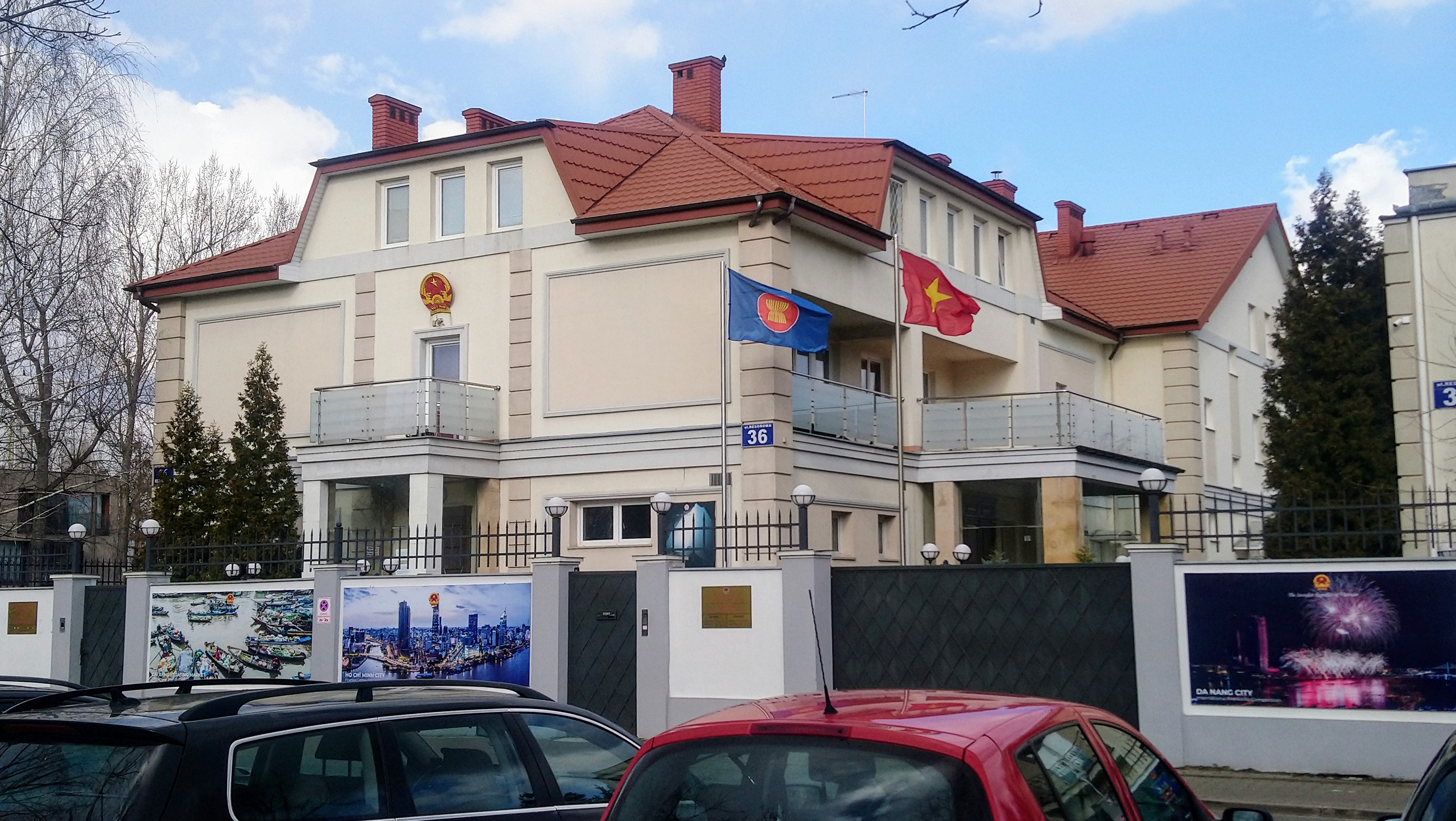
Embassy of Vietnam in Warsaw

== Books and articles ==
- Karnow, Stanley Vietnam: A History, New York: Viking, 1983, ISBN 0670746045
- Gnoinska, Margaret "Poland and Vietnam, 1963: New Evidence on Secret Communist Diplomacy and the "Maneli Affair"" pages 2-83 from Cold War International History Project Working Paper 45 March 2005
- Thakur, Ramesh "Peacekeeping and Foreign Policy: Canada, India and the International Commission in Vietnam, 1954-1965" pages 125-153 from British Journal of International Studies Volume 6, Issue 2, July 1980

== See also ==
- Foreign relations of Poland
- Foreign relations of Vietnam
