= Academy of Kraków (disambiguation) =

Academy of Kraków (Cracow) or Kraków (Cracow) Academy most often refers to Jagiellonian University, the most famous of the universities of Kraków, Poland, and which held the official name of Akademia Krakowska until the 18th century.

Academy of Kraków may also refer to:

- Academy of Fine Arts in Kraków
- Kraków University of Economics
- Academy of Music in Kraków
