= Grzegorz Kowal =

Polish diplomat

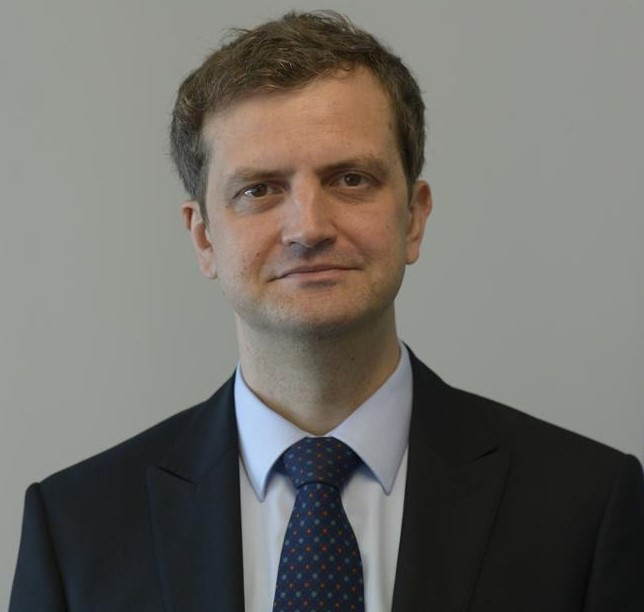

4th Poland Ambassador to New Zealand
- In office 5 November 2020 – July 2024
- Preceded by: Zbigniew Gniatkowski
- Succeeded by: Patryk Błaszczak

Personal details
- Spouse: Zofia Halwic
- Education: University of Warsaw
- Profession: Diplomat

Grzegorz Kowal is a Polish diplomat who served as Poland's ambassador to New Zealand (2020–2024).

== Education ==
Grzegorz Kowal earned his master's degree in international relations at the University of Warsaw. In 2009, he graduated from the National School of Public Administration and political science doctoral programme at the University of Warsaw (2009).

== Career ==
After graduating, he joined the Ministry of Foreign Affairs, specializing in relations with countries of the Asia-Pacific region. Following his work as a head of division, in 2011, he was sent to the Embassy in Seoul, South Korea, where he was the 1st Secretary for political cooperation. He was temporarily in charge of consular affairs as well. In 2015 he returned to Warsaw, serving as a specialist at the MFA Bureau of Control and Audit. In 2019, he became the director of the Asia-Pacific Department.

In August 2020, Kowal was nominated as Ambassador to New Zealand, additionally accredited to Kiribati, Samoa, Tonga, and Tuvalu. On 5 November 2020, he presented his credentials to the Governor-General of New Zealand Patsy Reddy. He ended his mission in July 2024.
