= Asia–Europe Foundation =

Singapore-based not-for-profit organization

Asia-Europe Foundation
- Logo
- Headquarters: Singapore
- Working language: English
- Type: Not-for-profit Organization
- Members: 53 list

Leaders
  - Chair 2026, ASEF Board of Governors: Ambassador SUH Chung Ha (Korea)
  - Vice-Chair 2026, ASEF Board of Governors: Mr José PINTOR AGUILAR (Spain)
  - ASEF Executive Director: Ambassador Beata STOCZYŃSKA (Poland)
- Establishment: 15 February 1997
- Website www.ASEF.org

The Asia–Europe Foundation (ASEF) is an intergovernmental not-for-profit organization located in Singapore. Founded in 1997, it is the only institution of the Asia-Europe Meeting (ASEM). Its purpose is to promote mutual understanding and cooperation between the people of Asia and Europe through intellectual, cultural, and people-to-people exchanges.

Every year, ASEF runs about 20 projects in Asia and Europe together with over 100 partner organisations, mainly conferences, seminars and workshops. More than 1,000 Asians and Europeans actively participate in its activities annually and it reaches much wider audiences through its networks, web-portals, publications, lectures and exhibitions.

== History ==
In March 1996, the leaders of 25 Asian and European countries as well as the European Commission, met in Bangkok, Thailand, for the 1st Asia-Europe Meeting (ASEM) Summit (ASEM1). At this inaugural meeting, they agreed on the establishment of the Asia–Europe Foundation (ASEF) on 15 February 1997 as a central institution of ASEM's social, cultural and educational pillar. The main tasks of ASEF are to bring the civil societies of Asia and Europe together and to become an interface between civil society and governments by facilitating interactions among people from diverse fields and transmitting the resulting outputs as recommendations to policy-makers.

By nature, ASEF is different from other organisations, as it works with both the civil societies and public sectors of the ASEM Partners as well as the private sector. It works on creating sustainable networks and it injects civil society inputs into the ASEM Process, enhancing the ASEM Process. This unique attribute allows ASEF's activities to generate ideas and solutions that would not normally emerge from pure civil society or inter-governmental processes.

To date, ASEF is the only permanently established institution of the ASEM Process.

== Thematic Areas ==
ASEF focuses in its work on the following key thematic areas: culture, education, governance, economy, sustainable development, public health, and media.

=== Culture ===
ASEF promotes various forms of cultural cooperation between Asia and Europe, including policy dialogue, bi-regional networks and artistic collaborations. It fosters sustainable partnerships between Asian and European arts organisations, while also facilitating dialogue between the arts sector and government agencies responsible for culture.

=== Education ===
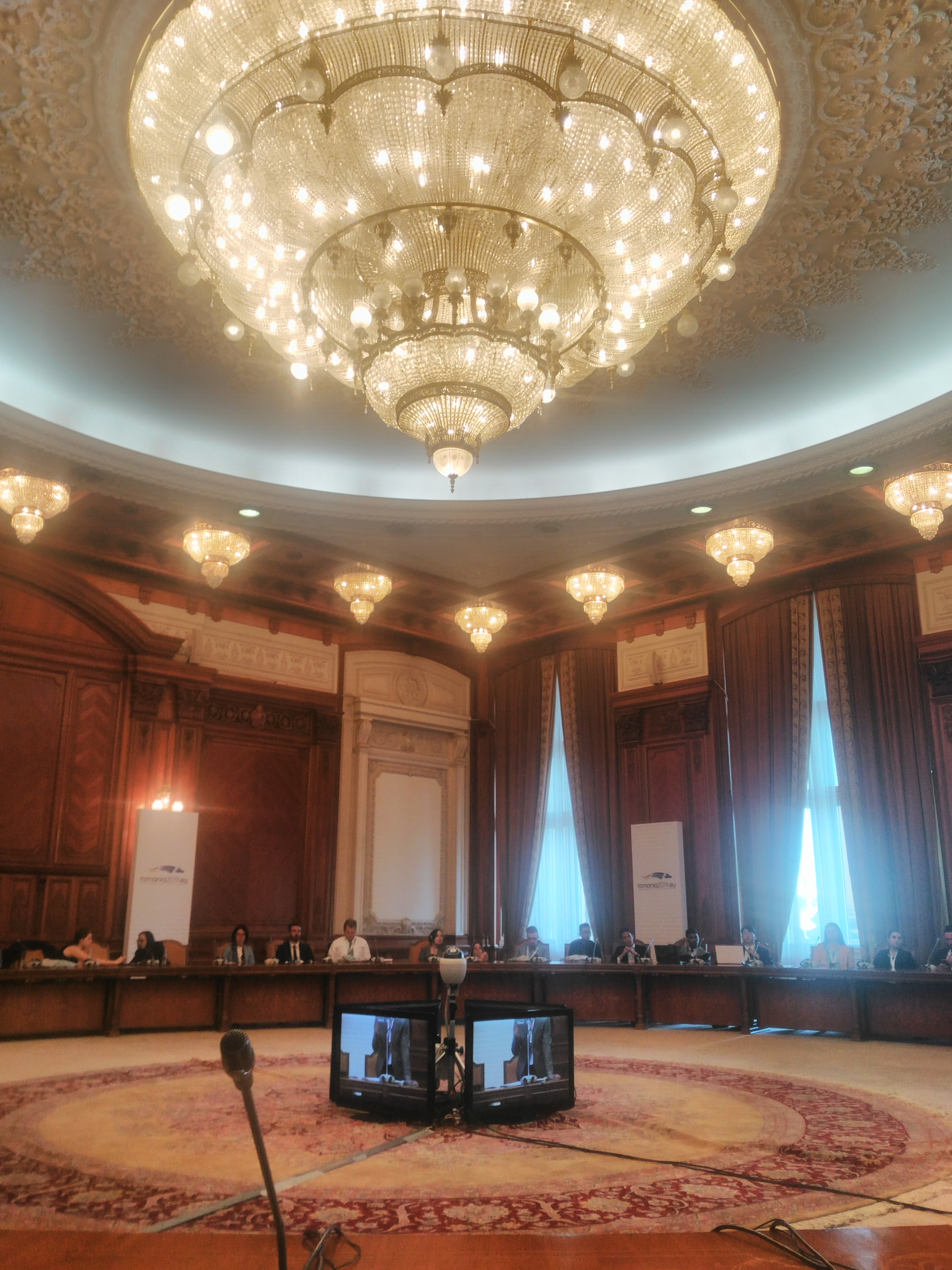
7th ASEF Rectors Conference & Students Forum (ARC7) in May 2019 in Bucharest, Romania.

ASEF has set in motion projects which contribute to education policy dialogue and facilitate youth networks. Through interdisciplinary and pragmatic approaches, as well as the integration of ICT as an essential component, ASEF’s education projects strengthen collaboration between education institutions and exchange among young people, while linking them to the ASEM Education Process and ASEM Leaders' Meetings.

=== Governance ===
Respect for human rights, rule of law, effective participation, and accountability of public institutions are some areas that lay the foundation for good governance. ASEF encourages informal, open and non-confrontational dialogue between civil society, government and international organisation representatives on human rights topics of common interest to the 2 regions. Public diplomacy is being promoted in Asia and in Europe for a better understanding of ASEM challenges.

=== Economy ===
Together with its partners of the Asia Europe Economic Forum (AEEF) ASEF addresses current economic issues and long-term trends impacting Asian and European societies in line with ASEM’s political and economic agenda concerning the international financial and economic situation across ASEM constituencies.

=== Sustainable Development ===
Since its inception, ASEF has initiated several dialogue platforms on sustainable development and climate change issues in Asia and Europe. Reflecting priorities of the ASEM Process as well as the needs of stakeholders at international, regional, and national levels, ASEF’s activities in this field focus on contributing to the implementation of the 2030 Agenda.

=== Public health ===
The ASEF Public Health Network (ASEF PHN) is part of the ASEM Initiative for the Rapid Containment of Pandemic Influenza. The initiative was officially launched in 2009 with the financial support from the Government of Japan. The ASEF PHN has been promoting bi-regional exchange of public health priorities with a strong focus on emerging infectious diseases, including pandemic influenza.

=== Media ===
Through its media projects, ASEF creates unique networking platforms for an exchange of views and ideas as well as cooperation among mass media representatives of Asia and Europe. The media projects include events with themes aligned with the agenda of Asia-Europe Meeting (ASEM) which can examine current issues relevant to Asia-Europe relations, challenges faced by the media industry, as well as the professional development of media personnel.

== Members ==
ASEF's members are the 53 Partners of the Asia-Europe Meeting (ASEM): 30 European countries, 21 Asian countries, and 2 regional organisations (the European Union and the ASEAN Secretariat).

== Funding ==
ASEF is funded by annual voluntary contributions from the 54 ASEM Partners and shares the financing of its projects with its civil society, public and private sector partners across Asia and Europe.

== Structure ==
ASEF reports to a Board of Governors whose members are appointed by each of the 53 ASEM Partners and who meet twice a year. At its permanent office in Singapore, ASEF is composed of 4 program departments, a Culture Department, an Education Department, a Governance & Economy Department, and a Sustainable Development & Public Health Department as well as a Communications Department, a Finance & Administrative Department, a Human Resource Department, and an Executive Office.

=== Executive Directors ===
- 2024-current (Poland) Ambassador Beata STOCZYŃSKA
- 2020–2024 (Japan) Mr MORIKAWA Toru
- 2020–2020 (China) Mr SUN Xiangyang (acting)
- 2016–2020 (Germany) Ambassador Karsten WARNECKE
- 2012–2016 (China) Ambassador ZHANG Yan
- 2011–2012 (France) Ambassador Michel FILHOL
- 2008–2011 (France) Ambassador Dominique GIRARD
- 2004–2008 (South Korea) Ambassador CHO Wonil
- 2000–2004 (Spain) Ambassador Delfín COLOMÉ
- 1997–2000 (Singapore) Ambassador Professor Tommy KOH

=== Deputy Executive Directors ===
- 2024-current (China) Mr ZHANG Lei
- 2020–2024 (Luxembourg) Mr Leon FABER
- 2017–2019 (China) Mr SUN Xiangyang
- 2012–2016 (Germany) Mr Karsten WARNECKE
- 2008–2012 (Vietnam) Ambassador NGUYEN Quoc Khanh
- 2006–2008 (France) Mr Bertrand FORT
- 2004–2006 (Germany) Mr Hendrik KLONINGER
- 2000–2004 (South Korea) Mr KIM Sung-Chul
- 1997–2000 (France) Mr Pierre BARROUX

== See also ==
- Asia-Europe Meeting (ASEM)
- EU–LAC Foundation
