= Vietnamese people in Poland =

Wietnamczycy
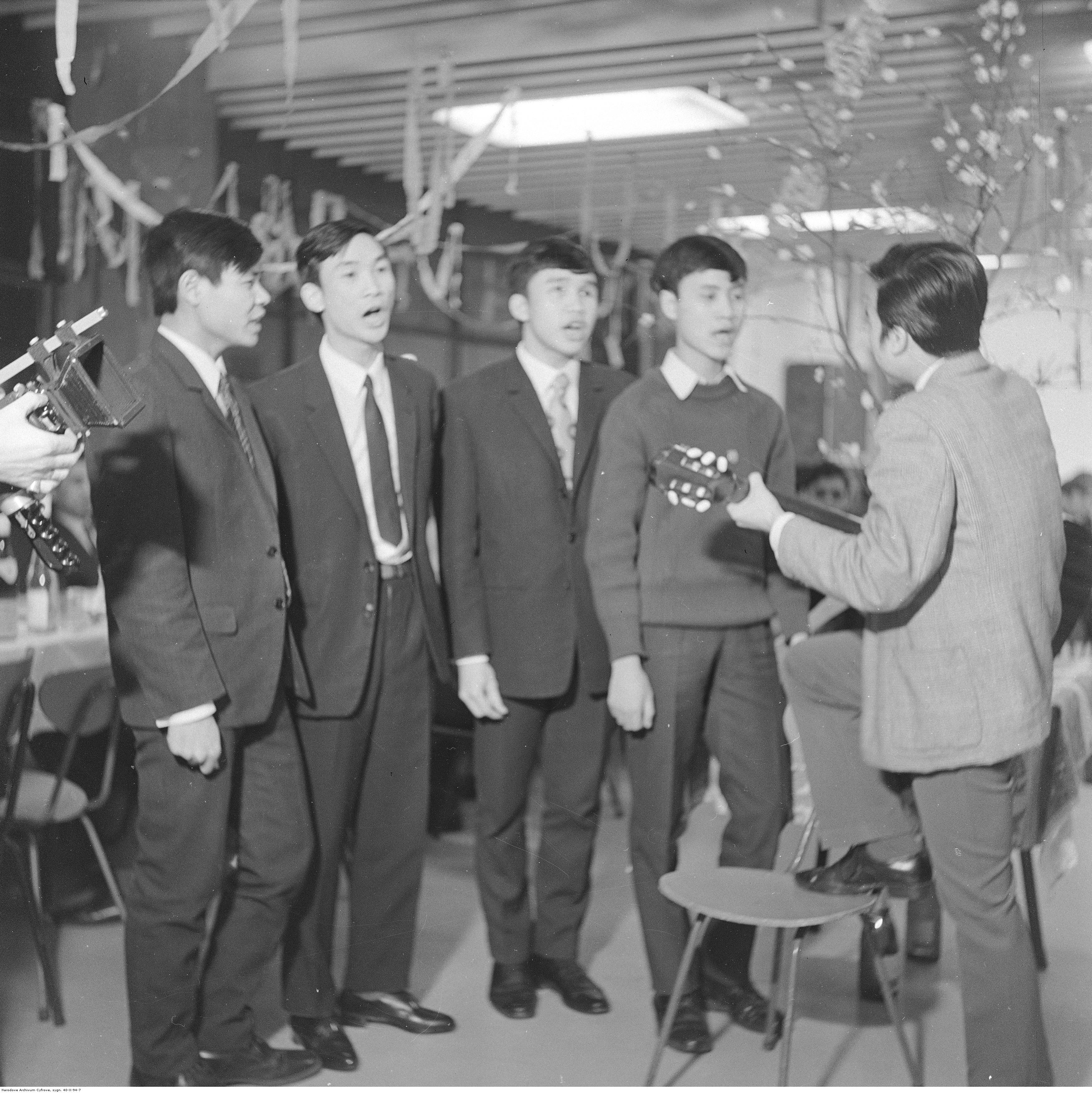
- Celebration of Tết by Vietnamese students in the University of Warsaw between 1967 and 1973. Photograph by Grażyna Rutowska from the NAC

Total population
- 40,000–60,000

Regions with significant populations
- Warsaw

Languages
- Vietnamese, Polish

Religion
- Vietnamese folk religion, Buddhism, Catholicism, Ancestor worship

Related ethnic groups
- Overseas Vietnamese, Kinh Vietnamese

Vietnamese people in Poland (Polish: Wietnamczycy w Polsce; Vietnamese: Người Việt tại Ba Lan) are the fourth largest Vietnamese community in the European Union, after France, Germany, and Czechia. The common estimates of their population range from 40,000 to 60,000 (2022). They are Poland's largest non-European immigrant community.

== Demography ==
The Polish census of 2021 revealed that 5,271 respondents indicate Vietnamese as their nationality. The Vietnamese embassy and Vietnamese community leaders in Poland estimate that about 20,000 to 30,000 Vietnamese people may reside in Poland, while the Polish government in 2002 put the upper range at about 50,000.

As they are Poland's largest non-European immigrant community, they are also one of Poland's most visible immigrant groups. Members of the Polish public commonly hold the mistaken belief that the Vietnamese form Poland's largest foreign community, but this title belongs to immigrants from the former USSR. The Vietnamese population is mainly concentrated in the Polish capital of Warsaw, and to a lesser extent in other major cities.

== History ==
Poland–Vietnam relations grew from the 1950s and 1980s student exchange programs, as during this period both countries were allied members of the Eastern Bloc (the former then known as the Polish People's Republic). Many of the Vietnamese students who stayed in Poland following their studies would start working as vendors on street markets, which were booming in Poland of the late 1980s and early 1990s. However, over time, some would move on to other industries as their fluency in Polish grew and their position in the country became more stable.

Following the change of regime in Poland, resulting in privatisation and transition to a market economy in the 1990s, the country gradually became a more attractive destination for the Vietnamese people, especially small entrepreneurs; this triggered a second, larger wave of Vietnamese immigration to Poland. Many began as vendors in the open air market bazaar at the 10th-Anniversary Stadium, selling clothes or cheap food. As of 2005, there were between 1,100 and 1,200 Vietnamese-owned stands in the area. As of 2002, there were an estimated 500 Vietnamese restaurants in Warsaw, mostly serving fast food. The cuisine offered by some of the Vietnamese businesses in Poland changed over the years, from lower quality takeaways to more authentic Vietnamese dishes.

The 10th-Anniversary Stadium was arguably the centre of the Vietnamese community. The Vietnamese community also has a number of non-governmental organisations. Over time, as the street markets and bazaars of Poland diminished, the Vietnamese community in Warsaw and other parts of the country began to switch to different sectors. Although traditionally associated with trading at stalls, some of the Vietnamese minority in Poland (particularly younger individuals) are now working in Vietnamese restaurants, graphic design, software development, IT, insurance, and banking. Some of the older generation also gave up selling at bazaars in favour of running beauty salons.

Two Tết (Vietnamese Lunar New Year) festivals have emerged in the late twentieth century and represent the different growing political identities of the Vietnamese community. The larger events are organized by long standing Vietnamese associations, like the Association of Vietnamese in Poland, that work in conjunction with the Socialist Republic of Vietnam. As of 2014, the event received a few hundred attendees with a Vietnamese majority. The second festival is organized by a smaller pro-democratic organization called the Freedom of Speech Society. The event receives a smaller turnout with about a hundred individuals, and is attended more by human rights activists and students rather than Vietnamese individuals due to its antigovernmental stance. Both festivals aim to promote Vietnamese culture to the greater Polish community.

== Language ==
In 2007, the Lac Long Quan School was opened in Warsaw to teach the Vietnamese language to Vietnamese children and provide Vietnamese adults with the opportunity to practice speaking their own language. Aside from learning the Vietnamese language, students are also educated in Vietnamese art, history, geography, culture, and customs. Additionally, the school holds festivals and other important events on special occasions such as Tết, the Vietnamese Lunar New Year. Later, the school opened new branches in Raszyn and Wrocław. As of 2021, there are 4,735 households that indicate Vietnamese as a household language.

== See also ==
- Poland–Vietnam relations
- Ethnic groups in Poland
- Vietnamese diaspora
- Category: Polish people of Vietnamese descent
