= Jacek Purchla =

Polish economist (born 1954)

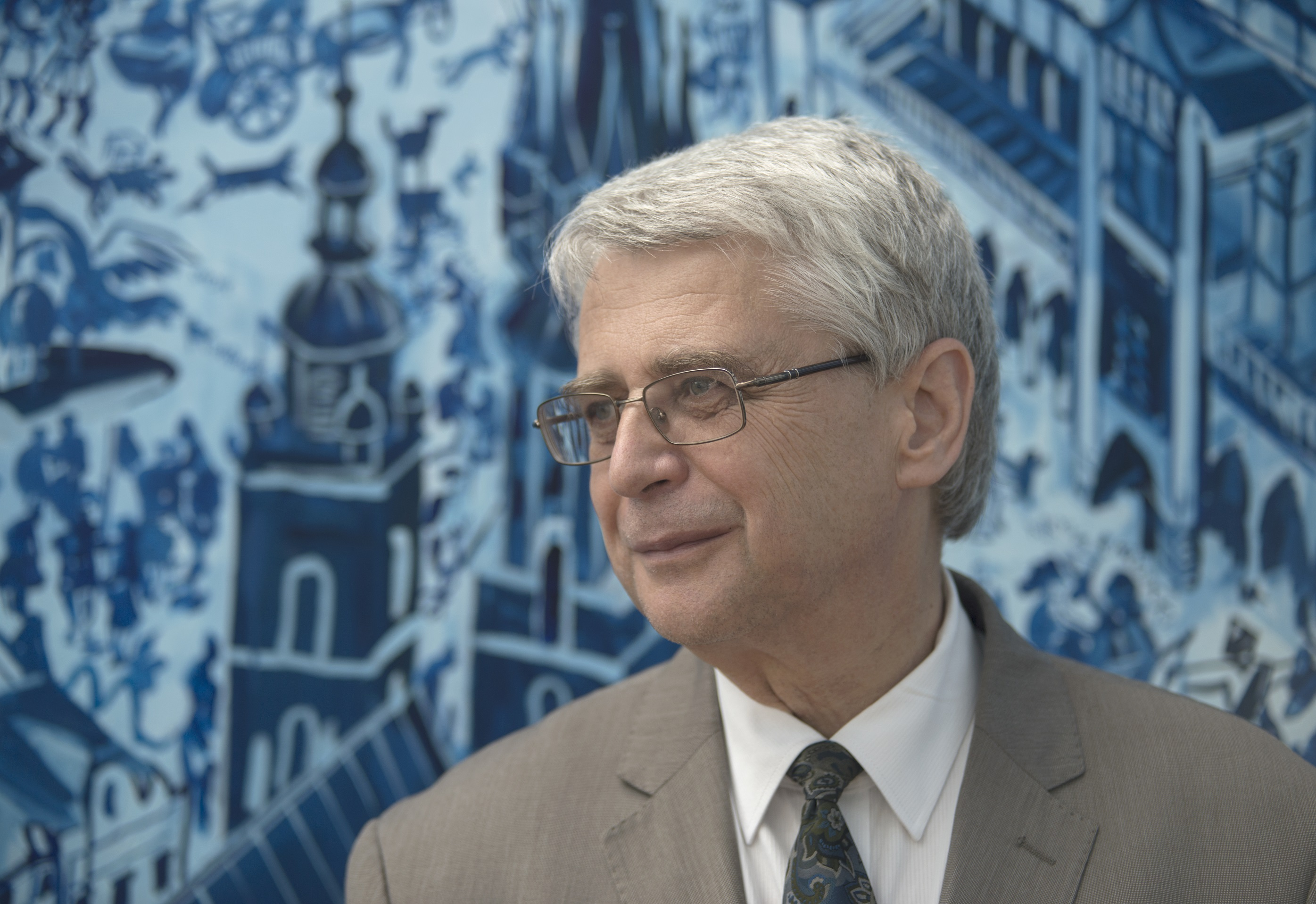
- Jacek Purchla (2015)
- Born: Jacek Purchla; 1954 (age 71–72); Kraków
- Education: Jagiellonian University
- Occupations: Director of Międzynarodowe Centrum Kultury / International Cultural Centre, Kraków; Chairperson of the 41st session of the World Heritage Committee; Art Historian; Cultural Heritage specialist

Jacek Purchla (born 1954 in Kraków) is a Polish art historian and economist, Professor of Humanities, founder and director of the International Cultural Centre in Kraków. He specialises in urban development, social history and art history of the 19th and 20th centuries, as well as the theory and protection of cultural heritage.

== Education and employment ==
Jacek Purchla graduated in Economics and Art History. He received his PhD (1983) and habilitation (second doctoral degree) from the Jagiellonian University. He has been a titular professor since 1994 and full professor of humanities (professor ordinarius) since 1997. He is a member of the Polish Academy of Arts and Sciences. He is the head of the Department of Economic and Social History and the UNESCO Chair for Heritage and Urban Studies at the Krakow University of Economics, as well as the head of the Centre of European Heritage, Institute of European Studies at the Jagiellonian University.

From 1990 to 1991 he was a vice-mayor of the city of Kraków. He has been the founder and director of the International Cultural Centre in Kraków since its inception in 1991. From 1995 to 2001 he was a professor in the Institute of Art History at the Jagiellonian University. Since 2015 he has been the President of the Polish National Commission for UNESCO (previously, 2012–2015, its Vice-president). In 2016, has been elected the Chairperson of the 41st session of the World Heritage Committee.

== Research areas ==
Jacek Purchla's scholarly activities are of interdisciplinary character, and his interests focus primarily on widely understood urban issues and problems connected with the development of cities. He managed to create a modern technique of an “urbanologist”, considering a city to be a complex organism, composed of social, economic, political and cultural processes. In his activities, another important emphasis was placed on research into the 19th and 20th century architecture, which he pioneered already in the mid-1970s, and in which he analysed, in an innovative way, such factors as construction law, the role of public patronage, education, political, social and economic issues. In recent years, he has initiated interdisciplinary studies in the theory of heritage and historic city management. Since 2005, he has been the founder and head of the first Polish European Heritage Department.

== Functions ==
Selection of various functions: an editor of the “Rocznik Krakowski” [Krakow Yearly] (with Jerzy Wyrozumski) since 1989; a member of the Art Studies Committee at the Polish Academy of Sciences; a member of the Comité International d’Histoire de l’Art (CIHA). He is a member of many organisations and associations, including the Europa Nostra Council in The Hague. He is an expert member of the ICOMOS International Scientific Committee on the Theory and Philosophy of Conservation and Restoration of Cultural Property, an expert of the European Commission in the European Heritage Label project, a member of the Advisory Council of Anna Lindh Euro-Mediterranean Foundation for the Dialogue Between Cultures. He was the chairmen of the Monument Preservation Council at the Ministry of Culture and National Heritage in Poland (2000-2016).

== Fellowships ==
Jacek Purchla's major foreign fellowships include Eisenhower Exchange Fellowships Programme (1991); Alexander von Humboldt Stiftung (1992-1993, 1997, 2005, 2015); the University of Leuven (1995); Salzburg Seminar (1995, 2000); the University of Heidelberg (1996); Australian Institute for Polish Affairs (2003); British Council (2004). He also took part in extended fellowship programmes in Tilburg (the Netherlands), Vienna, Grand Valley State University (Michigan, USA) and London.

== Orders and distinctions (selection) ==
- Knight's Cross, Officer's Cross and Commander's Cross of the Order of Polonia Restituta
- Golden Order of Merit of the Republic of Austria
- Golden Cross of Merit of the Republic of Hungary
- Knight's Cross of the Order of Leopold (Belgium)
- Cross of Merit on Ribbon of the Federal Republic of Germany
- Officer's Cross of the Order of Merit of Norway
- Officer's Cross of the Order of Merit of Hungary
- Rheinlandtaler (Cologne)
- Aleksander Gieysztor Award
- Mitteleuropapreis
- Prize of Economic Forum in Krynica New Culture of the New Europe
- Order for Merits to Lithuania (2020)

== Publications (selection) ==
- Jak powstał nowoczesny Krakow [How modern Krakow originated], Krakow, 1979; 2nd edition, Krakow, 1990.
- Wien-Krakau im 19. Jahrhundert, Vienna, 1985.
- Jan Zawiejski – architekt przełomu XIX i XX wieku [Jan Zawiejski – an architect of the turn of the 19th and 20th centuries], Warsaw, 1986.
- Dom pod Globusem [A house under globe], Krakow, 1988; 2nd edition, Krakow, 1997 – co-author with Zbigniew Beiersdorf.
- Matecznik Polski. Pozaekonomiczne czynniki rozwoju Krakowa w okresie autonomii galicyjskiej [The cradle of Poland. Non-economic factors of Krakow's development in the period of Galician autonomy], Krakow, 1990; 2nd edition, Krakow, 1992.
- Krakau unter österreichischer Herrschaft 1846–1918. Faktoren seiner Entwicklung, Vienna-Cologne-Weimar, 1993.
- Das Theater und sein Architekt, Krakow, 1993)
- Krakow – prowincja czy metropolia? [Krakow – provinces or metropolis?], Krakow, 1996.
- Krakow in the European Core, Krakow, 2000, 2nd edition Krakow 2016, and various language versions (Kraków w Europie Środka, Krakau Mitten in Europa, Cracovia nell’Europa centrale, Cracovia en Europa Central, Cracovie dans l’Europe du Centre)
- Historia architektury Krakowa w zarysie [The outline of the architectural history of Krakow], Krakow, 2001 – co-author with Marcin Fabianski.
- Heritage vs. Transformation, Krakow, 2005.
- Gry w miasto [Playing a city], Krakow, 2011.
- Międzynarodowe Centrum Kultury. Początek [International Cultural Centre. The Beginning], Kraków 2015.
- Budúcnosť minulosti. Kultúrne dedičstvo strednej Európy dnes, Bratislava 2017.

Jacek Purchla is also a scientific editor of over 40 collective works and the author of over 400 articles published in many languages.

== Bibliography ==
- Władysław Tyrański Kto jest kim w Krakowie, Kraków 2000.
