= Świat Nieruchomości =

- Discipline: Economics, real estate
- Language: English, Polish
- Edited by: Adam Nalepka

Publication details
- History: 1991-present
- Publisher: Fundacja Uniwersytetu Ekonomicznego w Krakowie (Poland)
- Frequency: Quarterly

Standard abbreviations
- ISO 4: Świat Nieruchom.

Indexing
- ISSN: 1231-8841
- OCLC no.: 749194883

Links
- Journal homepage; Online access; Online archive

Świat Nieruchomości (English: World of Real Estate Journal) is a quarterly peer-reviewed academic journal. It was established in 1991 and covers real estate, concentrating mostly on Central and Eastern European countries. It is mainly written in Polish, however every article is published with an abstract written both in Polish and English. Every year's final issue is published in English. The journal is published by the Fundacja Uniwersytetu Ekonomicznego w Krakowie (English: Foundation of Cracow University of Economics).

The journal is listed by the Ministry of Science and Higher Education (Poland) in 'segment B', giving it 7 points out of 10.
