= Kraków University of Economics Museum =

Museum in Kraków, Poland

Muzeum Uniwersytetu Ekonomicznego w Krakowie is an economics museum of the Kraków University of Economics in Kraków, Poland. It was established in 2004.
