= Poles in Armenia =

Polish diaspora in Armenia

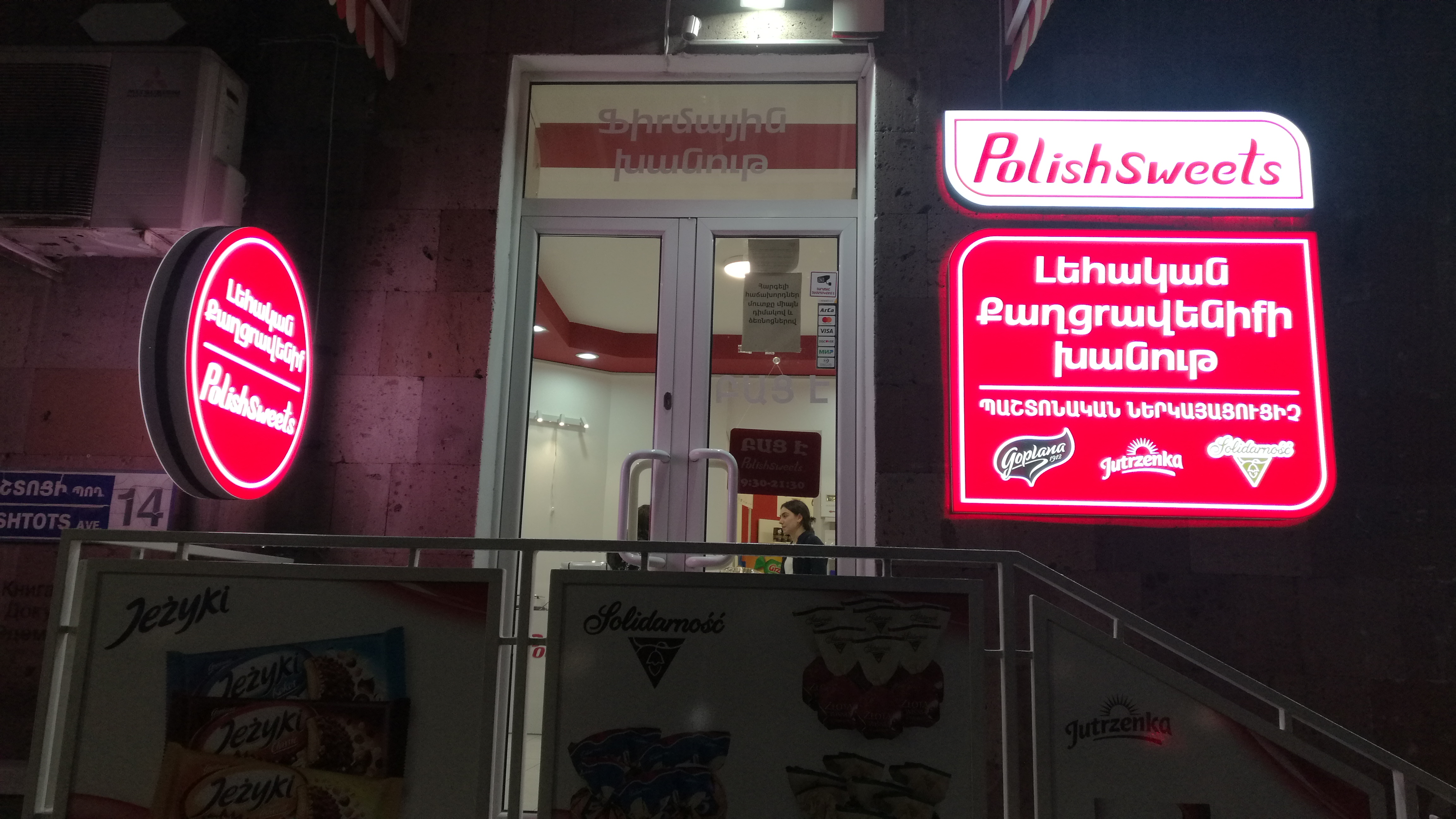
- Polish sweets shop in Yerevan

Total population
- several hundred (2002)

Regions with significant populations
- Yerevan, Gyumri, Vanadzor, Spitak, Stepanavan, Ashtarak, Armavir, Abovyan, Hrazdan, Vagharshapat

Languages
- Polish • Armenian • Russian

Poles in Armenia form a small population of a few hundred, and are part of the Polish diaspora of the Caucasus region, with first Poles coming to Armenia in the 16th century.

== History ==
Historical population
Year	Pop.	±%
1926	705	—
1939	240	−66.0%
1959	208	−13.3%
1970	389	+87.0%
1979	691	+77.6%
1989	270	−60.9%

Polish merchants visited Armenia since the 16th century. In the 17th century, Polish Catholic missionaries came to Armenia, and opened a mission station in 1669. Polish Jesuits in Armenia, Tadeusz Krusiński and Michał Wieczorkowski, spoke Armenian and, apart from missionary work, engaged in diplomacy and cultural activities.

After the Partitions of Poland carried out by Austria, Prussia and Russia in 1772–1795, and the annexation of Eastern Armenia by Russia in 1828, many Poles were either deported as political prisoners from the Russian Partition of Poland to Russian-controlled Armenian lands or were sent there after being conscripted to the Russian Army. Some conscripted Poles took part in the Russian capture of Kars in 1828. Polish poet Tadeusz Łada-Zabłocki was exiled by the Russians in Armenia in the 1840s. Since 1843, Polish engineer Kazimierz Łapczyński was also exiled in Armenia, where he eventually was employed in building forts. In 1850, Józef Chodźko became the first Pole and one of the first people overall to climb Mount Ararat.

Approximately 5,000 Poles lived in Armenia in the late 19th and early 20th century. Notable Polish communities existed in the cities of Yerevan, Gyumri, Kars and Ardahan. In 1917, Poles in Armenia established several Polish military associations.

Poles were repatriated from Armenia to newly reborn Poland since 1918. Polish navy officer Stanisław Korwin-Pawłowski started the creation of the Armenian Navy and founded a training center for the Armenian Navy. After World War II, some deported Poles from Soviet-occupied eastern Poland to Siberia and Kazakhstan, moved to Armenia.

In 1995, the Polonia Association of Poles in Armenia was established.

In 2021, a khachkar (cross carved in stone) commemorating Armenian-Polish friendship and Pope John Paul II was unveiled in Yerevan.

== See also ==
- Armenia–Poland relations
- Armenians in Poland

== Bibliography ==
- Chodubski, Andrzej (2009). "O Polakach w Armenii i Azerbejdżanie w XIX i na początku XX wieku". Studia Polonijne (in Polish). 30. Lublin. ISSN 0137-5210.
