= Beata Stoczyńska =

Polish politician

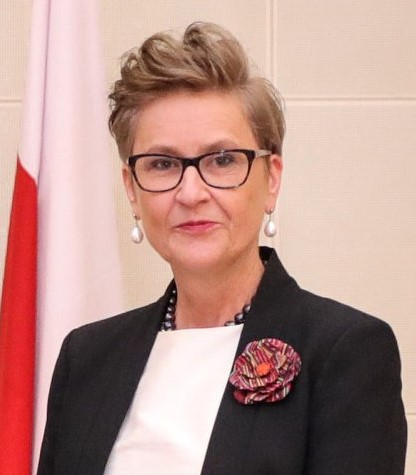

2nd Poland Ambassador to New Zealand
- In office 2009–2014
- Preceded by: Lech Mastalerz
- Succeeded by: Zbigniew Gniatkowski

Poland Ambassador to Indonesia
- In office February 2018 – July 2024
- Preceded by: Tadeusz Szumowski
- Succeeded by: Barbara Szymanowska

Personal details
- Born: 21 August 1961 (age 65) Sieradz, Poland
- Spouse: Sławomir Stoczyński
- Children: Justyna, Filip
- Education: Wroclaw University of Economics
- Profession: Diplomat

Beata Stoczyńska (born 21 August 1961 in Sieradz as Beata Sutuła) is a Polish diplomat, ambassador to New Zealand (2009–2014) and Indonesia (2018–2024).

== Life ==
Beata Stoczyńska was born on 21 August 1961 in Sieradz. She has graduated from the Wrocław University of Economics. She was also educated at Stanford University, Australian National University and in New Delhi.

In 1993 she began her career at the Ministry of Foreign Affairs. She worked as the deputy head of mission at the embassy in Canberra between 1996 and 2000. Afterwards, she was the deputy director of the Asia and Pacific Department. Between 24 November 2009 and 30 June 2014 she served as an ambassador to New Zealand. Later, she worked at the MFA on director post.

In February 2018 she was appointed ambassador to Indonesia, additionally accredited to East Timor and ASEAN. On 4 April 2018, she presented her credentials to the President of Indonesia Joko Widodo. She ended her mission in July 2024. On the same month she was elected Executive Director of the Asia–Europe Foundation for the term 2024–2028.

Besides Polish, Stoczyńska speaks English, French, and Russian.
