= Zbigniew Gniatkowski =

Polish politician

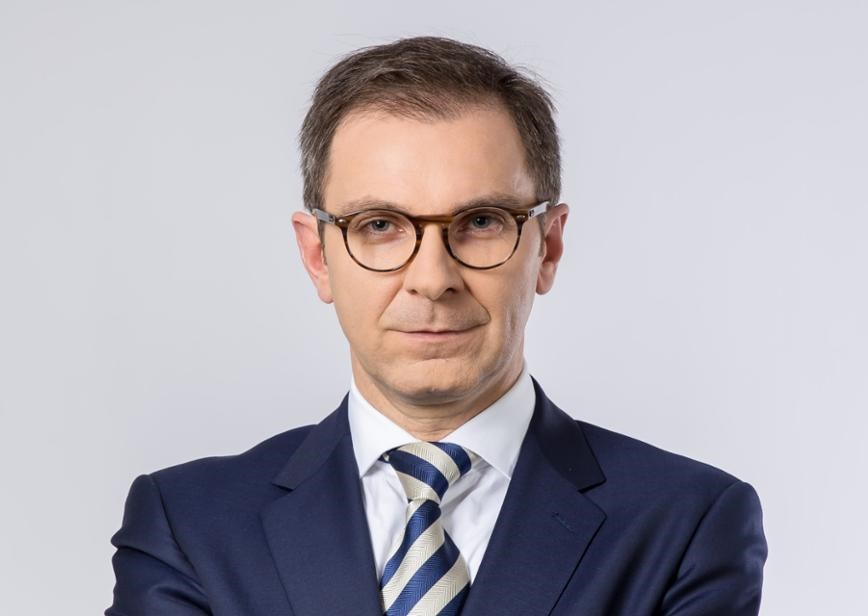

3rd Polish Ambassador to New Zealand
- In office 18 August 2014 – 30 September 2020
- Preceded by: Beata Stoczyńska
- Succeeded by: Grzegorz Kowal

Personal details
- Born: 1972 (age 53–54) Radomsko, Polish People’s Republic
- Education: John Paul II Catholic University of Lublin
- Profession: Diplomat

Zbigniew Gniatkowski (born in Radomsko) is a Polish civil servant and diplomat, and EU official, ambassador of Poland to New Zealand (2014–2020).

== Life ==
Zbigniew Gniatkowski graduated from John Paul II Catholic University of Lublin Romance studies (1996) and National School of Public Administration in Warsaw (2001).

From 1994 to 1999 he worked as a journalist. In 2001, he entered the Ministry of Foreign Affairs of the Republic of Poland. He served at the Polish embassies in Paris, Washington, D.C., Permanent Representation to the European Union in Brussels (2004–2008, as a Press Counsellor) and European Commission Representation in Warsaw (2008–2014, deputy head since 2013). From 18 August 2014 Zbigniew Gniatkowski served as the ambassador of Poland to New Zealand; he presented his letter of credence to Governor-General of New Zealand Jerry Mateparae on 17 September 2014. Since 2017 accredited also to Kiribati, Tuvalu, Samoa and Tonga, as the first Polish ambassador to these Pacific island countries. He ended his term on 30 September 2020.

Upon his return to the Foreign Ministry in Warsaw he worked in the Department for cooperation with Polish Diaspora. In September 2022, he rejoined the European Commission.

Besides Polish, he speaks English, French, and Spanish.
