= Barbara Szymanowska =

Polish diplomat

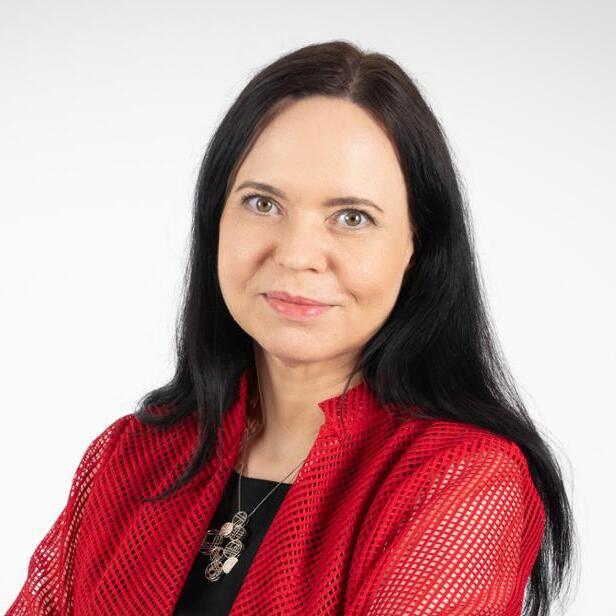

Poland Ambassador to Vietnam
- In office 19 May 2014 – 30 June 2018
- Preceded by: Roman Iwaszkiewicz
- Succeeded by: Wojciech Gerwel

Poland Ambassador to Indonesia
- Incumbent
- Assumed office 2025
- Preceded by: Beata Stoczyńska

Personal details
- Education: University of Warsaw
- Profession: diplomat

Barbara Magda Szymanowska is a Polish diplomat who served as ambassador of Poland to Vietnam (2014–2018) and Indonesia (since 2025).

== Life ==
Szymanowska graduated from law at the University of Warsaw. She completed also postgraduate studies at the University of Sussex (European Studies) and at the University of Warsaw (Management).

In 2000, she started her professional career at the Committee for European Integration. In 2004, she joined the Ministry of Foreign Affairs. Between 2005 and 2009, she was working at the MFA Department of Development Cooperation, being promoted to the deputy director. Next, until 2020, she served at the embassy in Kabul and counsellor to the Polish Task Force White Eagle. In 2010, she returned to Warsaw and became director of the MFA Department of Implementing the Development Programs, and in 2012 director of the MFA Department of Development Cooperation. In 2014, she began her mission as ambassador to Vietnam. She ended her mission on 30 June 2018. Between 10 September 2021 and January 2021, she headed the MFA Asia-Pacific Department. In January 2024, she took the post of the director of the MFA Department of Development Cooperation. On 17 March 2025, she assumed the duties of Chargé d'affaires ad interim to Indonesia, and in April 2025, as Ambassador to Indonesia, additionally accredited to East Timor and ASEAN.

Besides Polish, she speaks English, and Russian.

== Honours ==
- Knight's Cross of the Order of Polonia Restituta, Poland, 2011
- Friendship Order, Vietnam, 2020
