= Aleksander Surdej =

Polish economist and diplomat

Prof. Aleksander Surdej
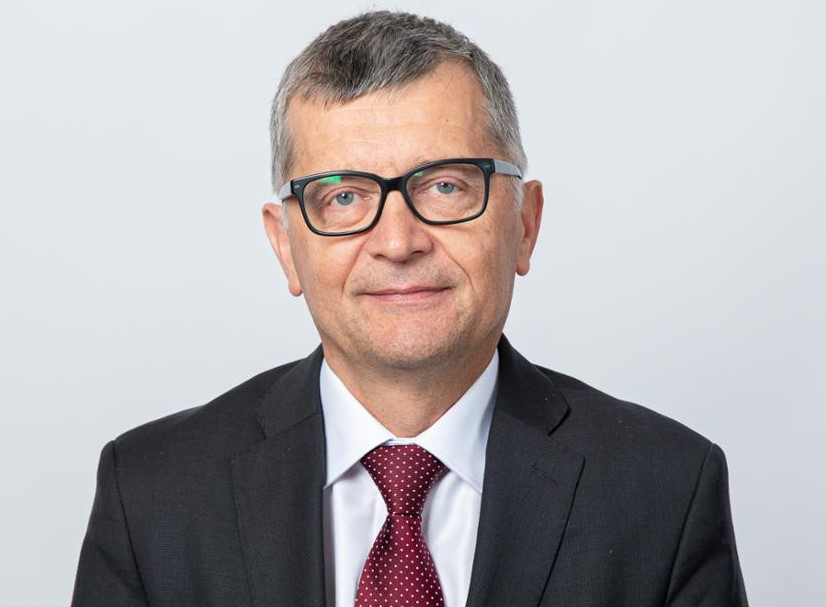

Poland Ambassador to the OECD
- In office 19 August 2016 – 31 October 2023
- Preceded by: Jakub Wiśniewski
- Succeeded by: Jacek Rostowski

Poland Ambassador to Vietnam
- In office 5 December 2023 – July 2024
- Preceded by: Wojciech Gerwel
- Succeeded by: Joanna Skoczek

Personal details
- Born: 1961 (age 64–65)
- Spouse: Irena Surdej
- Children: four
- Education: Kraków University of Economics
- Profession: economist, scientist, diplomat

Aleksander Surdej (born 1961) is a Polish economist and scientist who served as an Ambassador to Vietnam (2023–2024); and permanent representative to the Organisation for Economic Co-operation and Development (2016–2023). His research interests focus on the methodology of policy analysis, labour market policies and policies of social regulations.

== Life ==
Aleksander Surdej has graduated from international economics at the Kraków University of Economics as well as sociology at the Jagiellonian University. He completed an International Studies program at Johns Hopkins University SAIS, Ph.D. program at the European University Institute (EUI) in Florence and a research fellow there, was twice a fellow of Salzburg Global Seminar, World Institute for Development Economics Research in Helsinki and Netherlands Institute for Advanced Study in Wassenaar. He defended his Ph.D. in 1995 at Jagiellonian University and acquired post-doctoral degree in 2006.

Since 2007 he worked as a professor of economics at the Kraków University of Economics as the head of the Department of European Studies.

He is an author and editor of 14 books and more than 70 articles related to international economics published in Polish and international scientific journals.

Aleksander Surdej was collaborating with the Wim Kok group in the 2002 analysis of the consequences of EU enlargement, the World Bank and the Polish government. He has coordinated and participated in more than dozen international research projects. He has been also cooperating with Adam Smith Centre.

He speaks English, French, Italian and Russian.

Aleksander Surdej is married to Irena Surdej with four children.

== Works ==
- Small- and medium-sized development in Poland after 1990, Helsinki: WIDER, 2000.
- Determinanty regulacji administracyjnoprawnych w oddziaływaniu państwa na gospodarkę, Wydawnictwo Akademii Ekonomicznej w Krakowie, Kraków, 2006, ISBN 83-7252-297-9.
- Managing Ownership and Succession in Family Firms [ed. with Krzysztof Wach], Warszawa: Difin, 2010, ISBN 978-83-7383-402-6.
- Exploring the dynamics of entrepreneurship [ed. with Krzysztof Wach], Toruń; Kraków: Wydawnictwo Adam Marszałek, 2010, ISBN 978-83-7611-584-9.
- Succession Choices in Family Businesses. The Case of Poland [ed. with Krzysztof Wach], Toruń; Kraków: Wydawnictwo Adam Marszałek, 2011.
- Analiza ekonomiczna w polityce publicznej [ed.], Warszawa: Wydawnictwo Naukowe Scholar, 2012, ISBN 978-83-7383-579-5.
- Wprowadzenie do problematyki globalnych reżimów regulacyjnych [ed. with Jan Brzozowski], Toruń: Wydawnictwo Adam Marszałek, 2012, ISBN 978-83-7780-172-7.
- Ewaluacja w polityce publicznej [ed.], Warszawa: Difin, 2013, ISBN 978-83-7641-938-1.
- Terytorializacja lub funkcjonalizacja: dylematy ugrupowań integracyjnych [ed. with Jan Brzozowski], Toruń: Wydawnictwo Adam Marszałek, 2013, ISBN 978-83-7780-536-7.
- Economic Challenges for Higher Education in Central and Eastern Europe [ed. with Marcin Kędzierski], Toruń: Wydawnictwo Adam Marszałek, 2015, ISBN 978-83-8019-270-6.
- Tożsamość i efektywność: w poszukiwaniu mechanizmów zrównoważonego rozwoju [with Katarzyna Jarecka-Stępień], Toruń: Wydawnictwo Adam Marszałek, 2016, ISBN 978-83-8019-542-4.
