= Kraków University of Economics =

Business school in Kraków, Poland

Coordinates: 50°4′6″N 19°57′13″E

- Uniwersytet Ekonomiczny w Krakowie
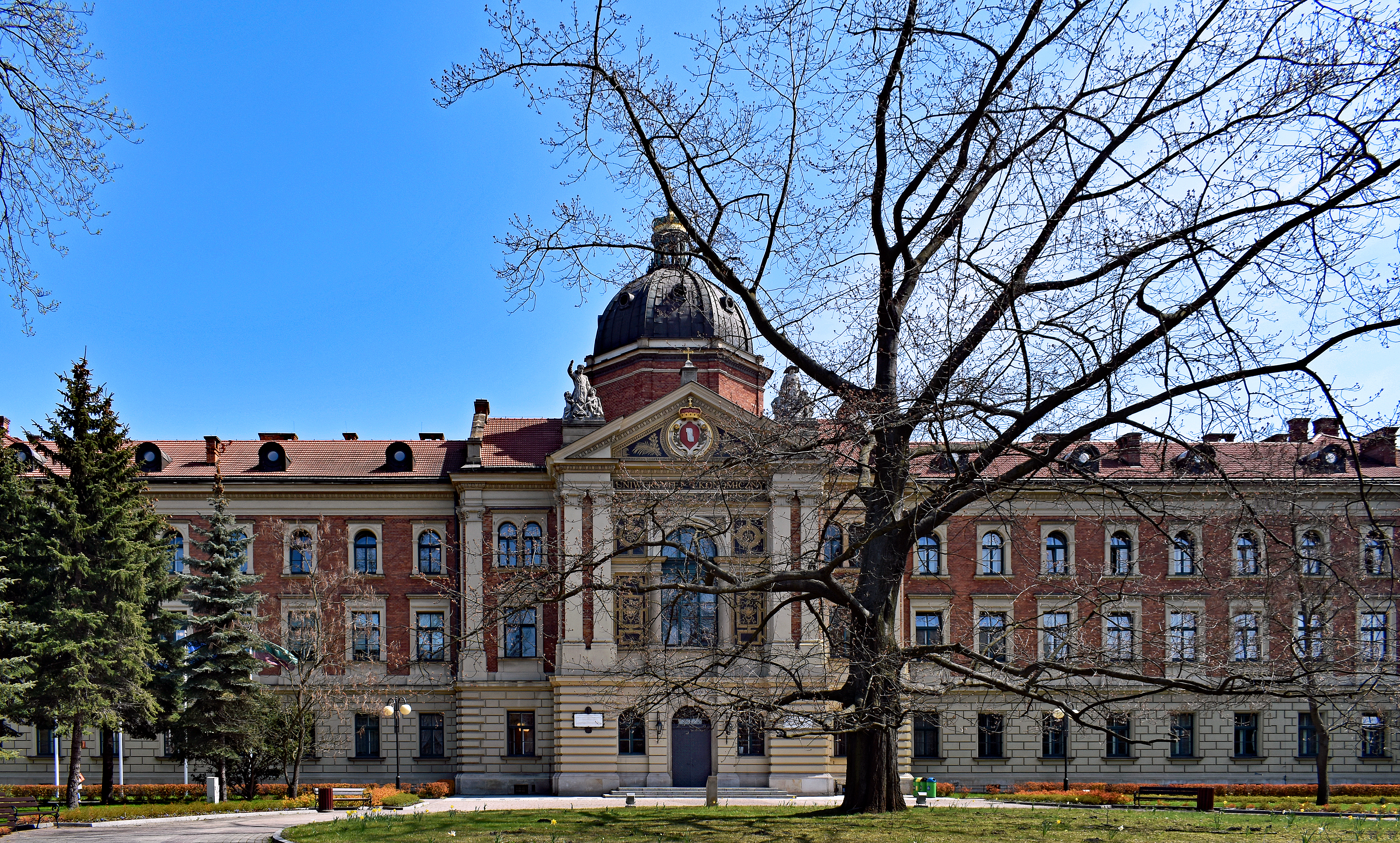
- Latin: Universitas Oeconomicae Cracoviensia
- Motto: Rerum cognoscere causas et valorem
- Type: Public
- Established: 1925
- Affiliations: EUA, NIBES, Socrates-Erasmus
- Rector: Professor Stanisław Mazur
- Students: 14,876 (12.2023)
- Location: 27 Rakowicka Street; 31–510 Kraków; Poland, Kraków, Poland
- Campus: Urban
- Colours: Burgundy and Dark green
- Website: www.uek.krakow.pl

Kraków University of Economics (Polish: Uniwersytet Ekonomiczny w Krakowie, abbreaviated UEK) is one of the five Polish public economics universities. UEK came into existence in 1925. It is the biggest university of economic sciences in Poland. Kraków University of Economics is one of the three largest universities in Kraków, after Jagiellonian University and the AGH University of Science and Technology. The motto and mission of the university in Latin is "Rerum cognoscere causas et valorem" (in English "To learn the causes and values of things. To provide universal education. To bring together professional and general knowledge of methodological and theoretical character.") Its 17-acre (69,000 m^{2}) campus is in the vicinity of historical medieval Old Town of Kraków and easily accessible both on foot or by public transportation. In addition to the main campus in Kraków, the university has seven Remote Teaching Centers in the cities of the region.

== History ==
The university opened its doors on October 1, 1925, as College of Commerce (Wyższe Studium Handlowe).

On 6 November 1939, as a part of Sonderaktion Krakau operation, the Nazis arrested professors of Cracow universities who later were executed or sent to concentration camps. Among them were four professors of the academy: Arnold Bolland, Zygmunt Sarna, Walenty Winid and Albin Żabiński, as well as many professors of other universities who were running some classes at the academy. Two buildings of the school were seized, and numerous library books and documents were lost. Classes continued surreptitiously throughout the war, until the school was able to reopen in 1945. The school was nationalized in 1950 and renamed as Higher School of Economics (Wyższa Szkoła Ekonomiczna).

In 1974 it was renamed again, as Kraków Academy of Economics (Akademia Ekonomiczna w Krakowie). In 2007 it received its current name: Kraków University of Economics (Uniwersytet Ekonomiczny w Krakowie).

== Degrees ==
Krakow University of Economics has national rights to admit:

- licencjat – 1st degree
- inżynier – Engineer degree in 2 majors
- Magister – European master's degree in 11 majors
- MBA degree – in cooperation with foreign universities
- MPA degree – in cooperation with foreign universities
- doktor nauk- PhD in 3 disciplines: economics, management and commodity sciences
- doktor habilitowany – Habilitation degree (post doc degree) in 3 disciplines: economics, management and commodity sciences

== Structure and organization ==
=== Faculties ===
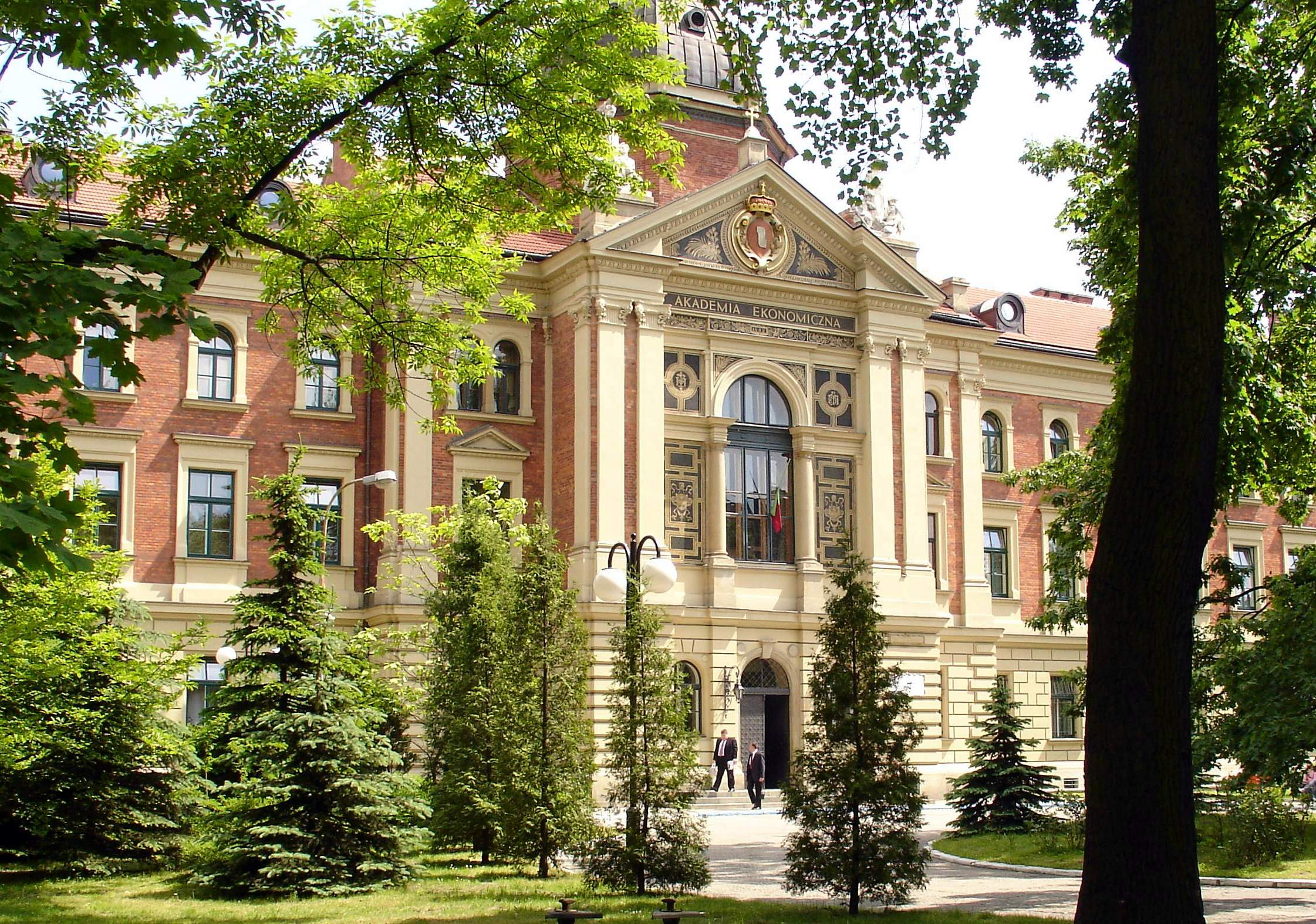
Main building of the university

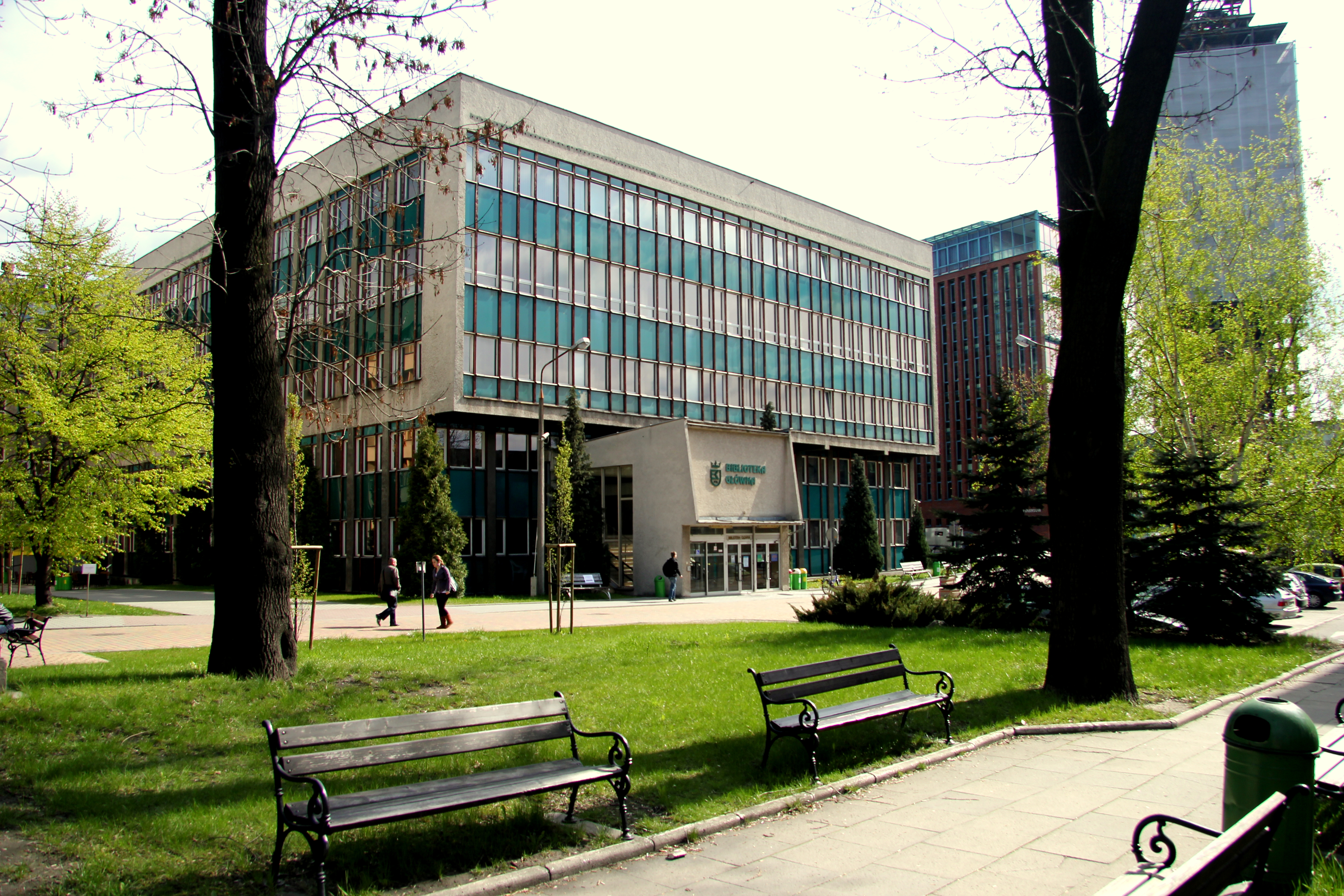
Main Library

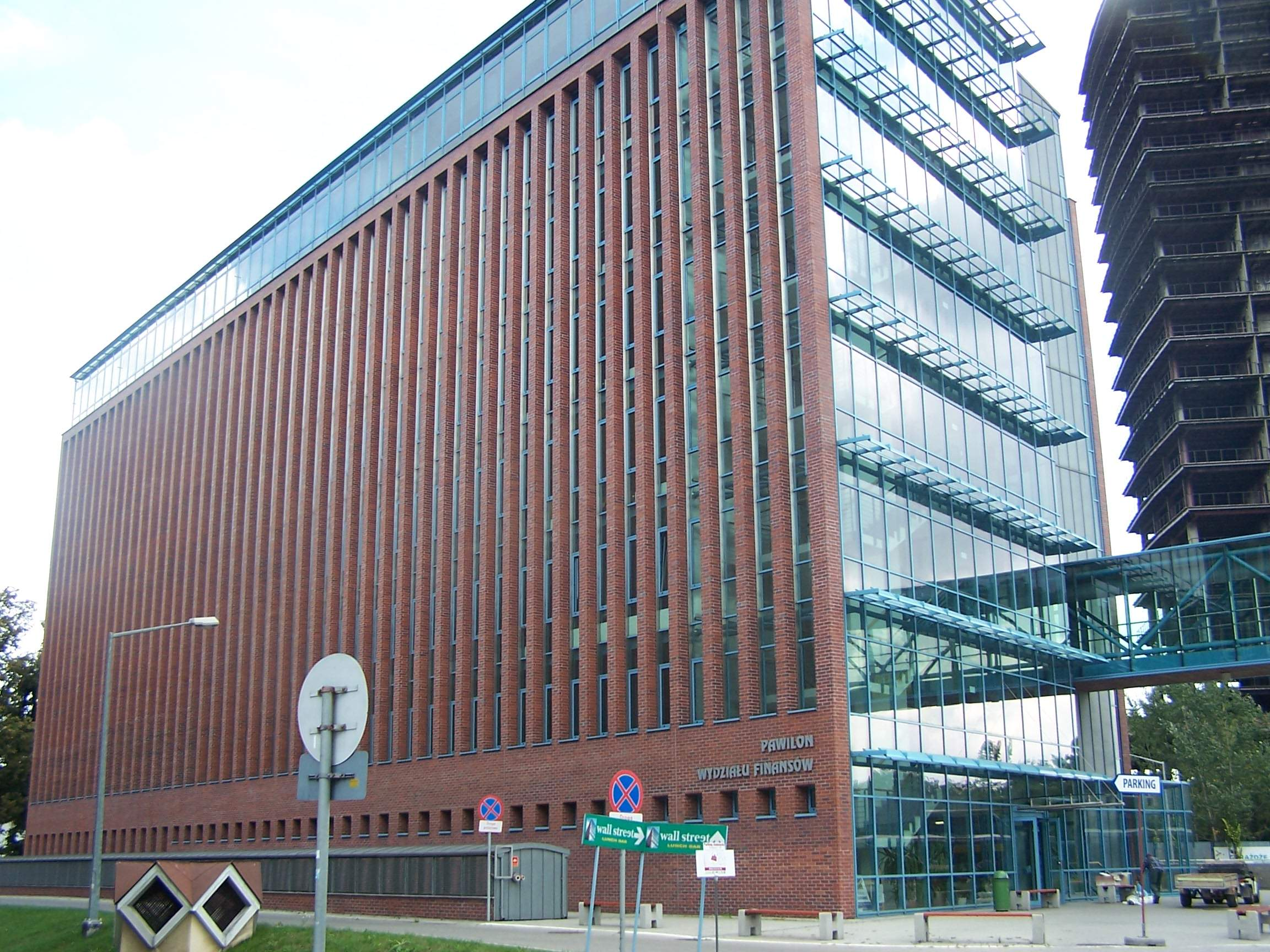
Faculty of finance

- Faculty of Economics and International Relations
  - Chair of Macroeconomics
  - Chair of Microeconomics
  - Chair of International Economics
  - Chair of Theory of Economics
  - Chair of European Economic Integration (Jean Monnet European Centre of Excellence)
  - Chair of European Studies
  - Chair of Foreign Trade
  - Chair of International Management
  - Chair of Human Capital Management
  - Chair of Economic Policy and Development Programming
  - Chair of Public Management and Administration
  - Chair of Entrepreneurship and Innovation
  - Chair of Strategic Analyses
  - Chair of Economics for Real Estate and Investment Process
  - Chair of Economic and Social History (UNESCO Chair for Heritage and Urban Studies)
  - Chair of History of Economic Thought
  - Chair of Political Science
  - Chair of Philosophy
  - Chair of Sociology
  - Chair of Psychology and Education
  - Chair of Organisation Strategy and Development
  - Chair of International and Comparative Law
  - Chair of Public Law
- Faculty of Finance
  - Chair of Finance
  - Chair of Corporate Finance
  - Chair of Regional Economy
  - Chair of Mathematics
  - Chair of Industrial Policy and Ecology
  - Chair of Law
  - Chair of Financial Accounting
  - Chair of Financial Markets
  - Chair of Insurance
  - Chair of Household Economics
- Faculty of Commodity Science
  - Chair of Chemistry and Process Kinetics
  - Chair of Applied Economics
  - Chair of Metrology and Instrumental Analysis
  - Chair of Commodity Microbiology
  - Chair of Product Packaging
  - Chair of Product Technology and Ecology
  - Chair of Industrial Commodity Science
  - Chair of Foodstuffs Commodity Science
  - Chair of Quality Management
- Faculty of Management
  - Chair of Market Analysis and Marketing Research
  - Chair of Consumption Research
  - Chair of Econometrics
  - Chair of Economics and Corporate Organisation
  - Chair of Commerce and Market Institutions
  - Chair of Information Technology
  - Chaor of Computational Systems
  - Chair of Marketing
  - Chair of Organisation and Management Methods
  - Chair of Management Process
  - Chair of Accounting
  - Chair of Statistics
  - Chair of Management Strategy
  - Chair of Tourism
  - Chair of Organisational Behaviour
  - Chair of Human Resources Management

=== Additional ===
- Kraków University of Economics Museum

== Study ==
There are about 20,000 students (full- and part-time). The university offers 13 majors and 38 specializations within the majors taught in the Polish language. The university offers also studies in the English language. The university offers plenty of postgraduate courses and studies as well as MBA programs in cooperation with foreign universities.

The studies in the Polish language are realized on the following majors:

- economics (B.Sc., M.Sc.)
- administration (B.A.)
- public management and administration (B.A.)
- international relations (B.A., M.A.)
- international economics (B.Sc., M.Sc.)
- management (B.Sc., M.Sc.)
- management and production engineering (B.Sc.)
- commodity science (B.Sc., M.Sc.)
- European studies (B.A.)
- finance and accountancy (B.Sc., M.Sc.)
- spatial management (B.Sc., M.Sc.)
- tourism and recreation (B.A.)
- IT studies and econometrics (B.Sc., M.Sc.)
- marketing and market communication (B.Sc., M.Sc.)

Studies in the English language are realized on the following majors:

- international business (B.Sc., M.Sc.)
- corporate finance and accountancy (B.Sc., M.Sc.)
- public management and administration (M.A.)

Krakow University of Economics offers also PhD studies in the following disciplines:

- in Polish: economics, management, commodity science
- in German: economics, management

== Periodical publications in English ==
- Rector's Lectures
- Argumenta Oeconomica Cracoviensia
- EMERGO – Journal of Transforming Economies and Societies
- Wiki Encyclopedia of Management "M-files"

== Periodical publications in Polish ==
- Świat Nieruchomości (English: World of Real Estate Journal)

== Affiliation ==
Krakow University of Economics is member of many international organizations and networks, such as:

- European University Association (EUA)
- International Council for Open and Distance Education (ICDE)
- Danube Rectors' Conference (DRC)
- Network of International Business and Economic Schools (NIBES)
- European Master of Business Studies (EMBS)
- European Business Consortium (EBC)
- International Education Knowledge Network (IEKN)
- US Department of State-Affiliated Overseas Educational Advising Centers
- SOCRATES-ERASMUS
- Central European Exchange Program for University Studies (CEEPUS)

== Notable alumni and faculty ==
- Karolina Borchardt (1905-1995), Polish artist and aviator.
- Rafał Brzoska (born 1977), entrepreneur, founder and owner of InPost
- Andrzej Domański (born 1981), economist and politician, Minister of Finance
- Andrzej Gut-Mostowy (born 1960), politician and economist
- Jerzy Hausner (born 1949), politician and economist
- Mateusz Polit (born 1975), choreographer
- Jacek Purchla (born 1954), economist and historian
- Aleksander Surdej (born 1961), economist and diplomat
- Dariusz Szwed (born 1967), politician, feminist, social activist and economist
- Beata Szydło (born 1963), ethnologist, politician, former Prime Minister of Poland
- Sobiesław Zasada (born 1930), rally driver and economist
