= Dominique Girard (diplomat) =

French diplomat

Dominique Girard is a French diplomat. He served as the French ambassador to Indonesia from 1992 to 1995, French ambassador to Australia from 1995 to 2000, French ambassador to India from 2002 to 2007. He also occupied several senior positions at the French foreign ministry. From 2008 to 2011 he was executive director of the Asia-Europe Foundation (ASEF).

While Ambassador to India, he arranged for several French films to be shown at the 37th International Film Festival of India (IFFI) in 2006.
