= Wojciech Gerwel =

Polish politician

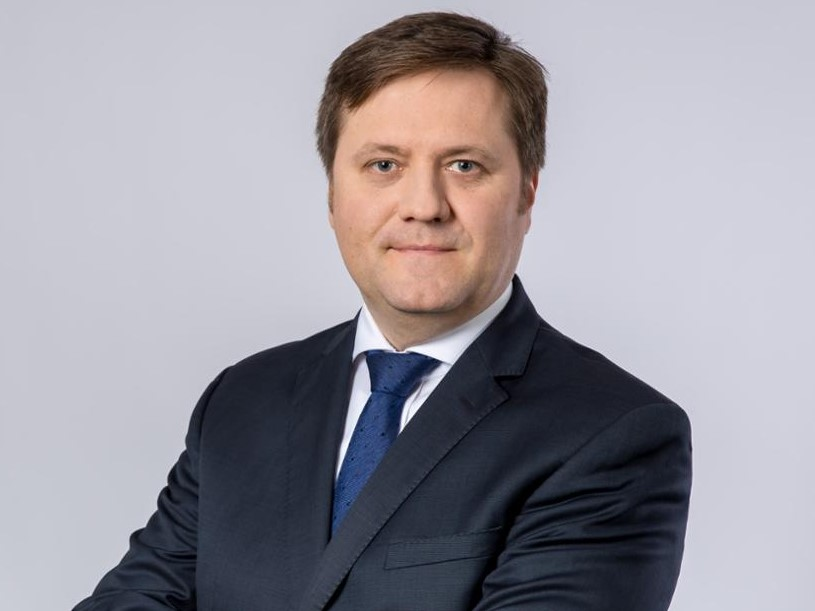

Poland Ambassador to Vietnam
- In office August 2018 – 30 November 2022
- Preceded by: Barbara Szymanowska
- Succeeded by: Aleksander Surdej

Personal details
- Born: 1 April 1978 (age 48) Gdynia
- Children: one daughter
- Education: Georgetown University; Simon Fraser University
- Profession: diplomat

Wojciech Piotr Gerwel (born 1 April 1978 in Gdynia) is a Polish diplomat who served as an Undersecretary of State at the Ministry of Foreign Affairs (2022–2023) and ambassador of Poland to Vietnam (2018–2022).

== Life ==
Wojciech Gerwel has been educated at the Lester B. Pearson College, Victoria (1995–1997). He has graduated from economics and political science at the Simon Fraser University, Vancouver (B.A.) and the School of Foreign Service at the Georgetown University (M.A.). He has been also studying at the Sciences Po, Paris.

He has been working as an analyst for the Center for European Policy Analysis in Washington, D.C., Center for Strategic and International Studies, Centre for International Governance Innovation, General Motors. In 2007 he entered the diplomatic service of Poland. Between 2007 and 2014 he served as an economic counsellor at the embassy in Hanoi. Later, he headed the unit at the Department of Economic Cooperation and analyst at the Department of Foreign Policy Strategy. He was also fellow of the Harvard University Weatherhead Center for International Affairs.

In August 2018, he became an ambassador of Poland to Vietnam. In 2019, Gerwel carried out a competition on Vietnamese Wikipedia, resulting in creating 2000 new articles about Poland. The winner, 23-year-old Võ Ka Anh Duy, who authored more than 800 articles, won 7-day trip to Poland. on 30 November 2022, Gerwel ended his term.

On 6 December 2022, he was nominated Undersecretary of State at the Ministry of Foreign Affairs for Economic Cooperation, the United Nations and Asia. He ended his term on 13 December 2023. Between 20 December 2023 and 5 August 2025, he was advisor to the President of Poland Andrzej Duda. Next, he was appointed MFA Special Envoy for the Indo-Pacific of the Republic of Poland.

Besides Polish, he speaks French, English, German and Russian. He is married, with a daughter.

== Honours ==
- Knight of the Order of Polonia Restituta (Poland, 2025)
- Commander of the Order for Merits to Lithuania (Lithuania, 2023)
- Friendship Order (Vietnam, 2026)
