= Foreign relations of Vietnam =

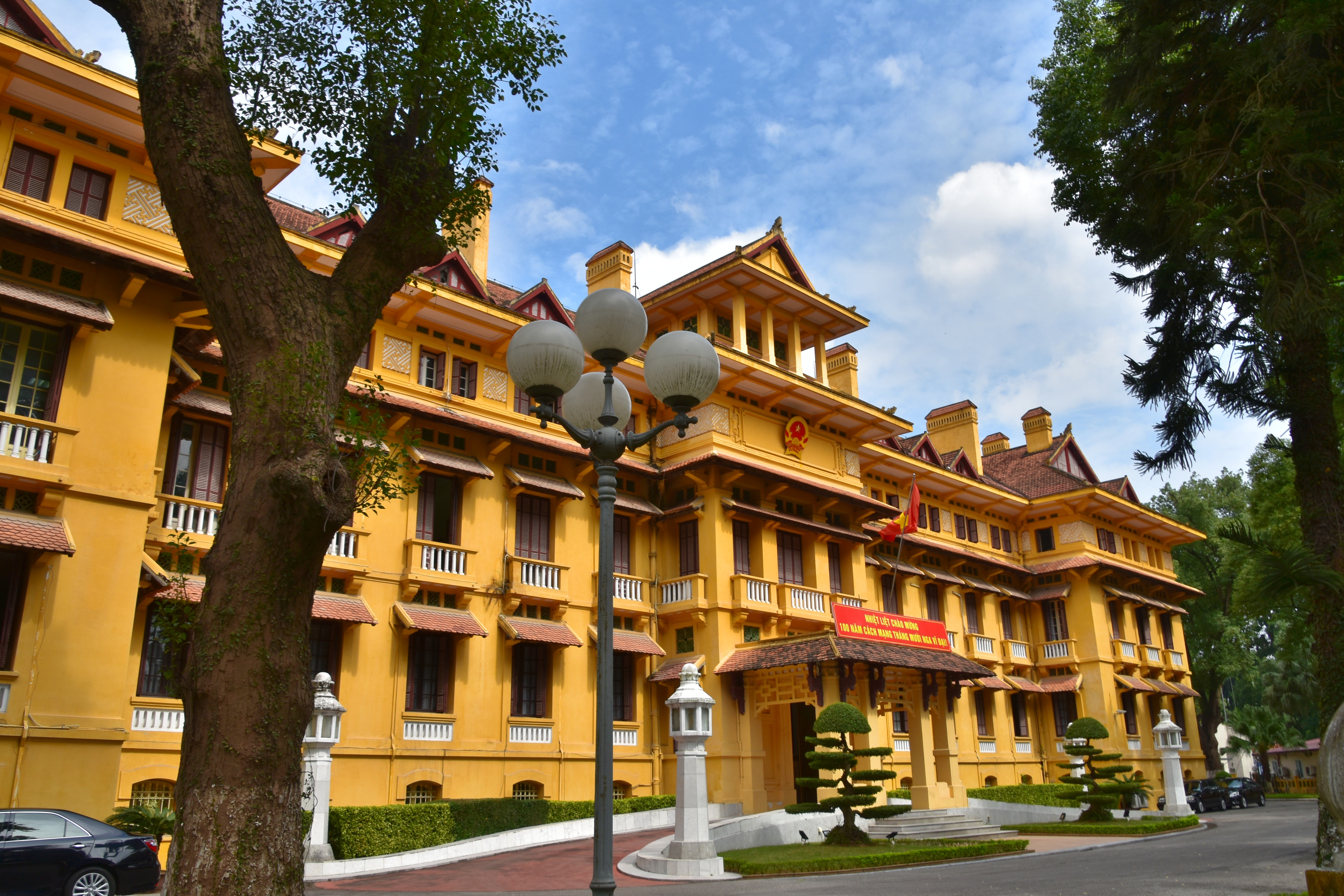
Foreign ministry in Hanoi

As of September 2025, Vietnam (officially the Socialist Republic of Vietnam) maintains diplomatic relations with all 192 other member states of the UN, as well as with the State of Palestine and Sahrawi Arab Democratic Republic.

Since the end of the Vietnam War and the unification of Vietnam, Vietnam's foreign policy has reflected a tension between two choices: "to reject the Western-led world order and oppose Western influence, or to accept the Western-led world order and adapt Western influence." Over time, Vietnam has become more engaged in the international community. Vietnam has shifted from a fierce opponent of the United States to having friendlier relations. Vietnam has for decades has both kept close economic and political ties with China and consistently sought to deny Chinese regional dominance.

== History ==
=== Monarchial Vietnam ===
In its early history, Vietnam tried to maintain good relations with its neighbours. During feudal dynasties such as the Ngô, Đinh, Anterior Lê, Lý, Trần, Lê, Tây Sơn and Nguyễn, Vietnam's main diplomatic relationships were with neighboring Imperial China, Kingdom of Champa, Kingdom of Lan Xang, Khmer Empire, and Siam. Later trading relationship were established with European countries (such as through the Dutch East India Company) and Japan.

=== Cold War era and the two Vietnams ===
Following Japan's surrender, British and Chinese Nationalist forces entered Vietnam to supervise the disarmament of Japanese troops. Following the 1946 Ho–Sainteny Agreement (a preliminary agreement), the communist-led Democratic Republic of Vietnam (DRV) was recognized as a free state within the French Union. However, total war broke out later that year. The anti-communist State of Vietnam (SVN) was established in 1949 under the Élysée Accords and recognized as an independent state associated with the French Union.

Having long embraced a "two-camp" worldview and regarded the United States as a leading enemy of world revolution, the Indochinese Communist Party worked to bring the DRV into the socialist camp. Following the Chinese Communist victory in 1949, Ho Chi Minh secretly visited Beijing and Moscow to seek recognition and aid. In January 1950, the People's Republic of China and the Soviet Union were the first two countries to recognize the DRV. Meanwhile, the United States and other Western countries recognized the SVN. The First Indochina War became internationalized and intertwined with the global Cold War.

The July 1954 Geneva Accords divided Vietnam at the 17th parallel, with the DRV in the north and the State of Vietnam (later the Republic of Vietnam) in the south. As of January 1975, South Vietnam was recognised by 95 countries, and North Vietnam was recognised by 65 countries. The division continued until the North conquered the South in 1975, and the reunification was formalized the following year.

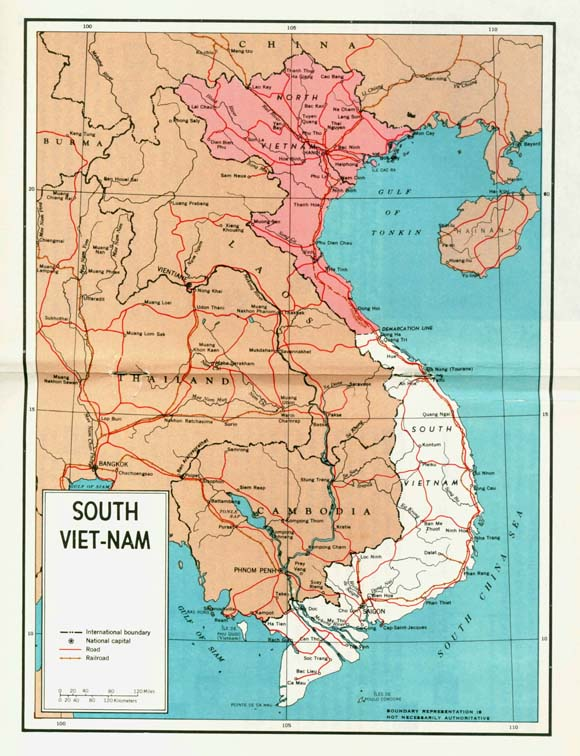
By 1966, South Vietnam had been recognized by about 60 states, while by 1972 North Vietnam had been recognized by 49 states.

During the Vietnam War (1959–1975), North Vietnam tried to balance relations with its two major allies, the Soviet Union and the People's Republic of China. In 1964, Zhou Enlai, worried about the escalation of U.S. forces in South Vietnam, made an informal agreement with the North. The agreement stipulated that if U.S. and South Vietnamese forces invaded North Vietnam, the Chinese would respond by loaning pilots to the North. During the invasion, Mao Zedong failed to send as many trained pilots as he promised. As a result, the North became more reliant on the Soviet Union for its defense.

By 1977, tension began to grow as Beijing increasingly viewed Vietnam as a potential Soviet instrument to encircle China. Meanwhile, Beijing's increasing support for Cambodia's Khmer Rouge sparked Vietnamese suspicions of China's motives.

Vietnamese-Chinese relations deteriorated significantly after Hanoi instituted a ban in March 1978 on private trade, a move that particularly affected the Sino-Vietnamese sector of the population. Following Vietnam's December 1978 invasion of Cambodia, China launched a retaliatory invasion of Vietnam's northern border region. Faced with severance of Chinese aid and strained international relations, Vietnam established even closer ties with the Soviet Union and its allies in the Comecon member states. Throughout the 1980s, Vietnam received nearly US$3 billion a year in economic and military aid from the Soviet Union and conducted most of its trade with the U.S.S.R. and Comecon countries. Soviet and Eastern bloc economic aid, however, ceased after the breakup of the Soviet Union.

==== International memberships ====
In 1951, both the State of Vietnam (SVN) and the Democratic Republic of Vietnam (DRV) applied for United Nations membership. In 1952, the SVN, which would later continue as the Republic of Vietnam (RVN), was granted observer status in the UN General Assembly. The DRV and the Republic of South Vietnam gained observer status only in July 1975.

The Soviet Union in 1952 vetoed the SVN's admission to full UN membership. In 1957, the General Assembly twice reaffirmed that the RVN was fully qualified for membership and should be admitted, yet both attempts were again vetoed by the Soviet Union. The Socialist Republic of Vietnam, unified in 1976, maintained a sole observer mission and was admitted as a full UN member in September 1977.

The State of Vietnam was admitted to several specialized agencies of the United Nations, including the World Health Organization (WHO), the International Labour Organization (ILO), the Food and Agriculture Organization (FAO), the United Nations Educational, Scientific and Cultural Organization (UNESCO), the International Telecommunication Union (ITU), and the Universal Postal Union (UPU). As the continuator of the State of Vietnam, the Republic of Vietnam maintained membership in these organizations and later joined the International Civil Aviation Organization (ICAO), the World Meteorological Organization (WMO), and the International Atomic Energy Agency (IAEA), among others.

Meanwhile, the Democratic Republic of Vietnam was not a member of any of these organizations and only joined the WMO in August 1975 and the WHO in October 1975. After the reunification of Vietnam in 1976, the Socialist Republic of Vietnam substituted for or continued South Vietnam's membership in many organizations, while in other cases it joined as a new member state.

== Đổi mới reforms ==
Vietnam didn't begin to emerge from international isolation until it withdrew its troops from Cambodia in 1989. Within months of the 1991 Paris Agreements, Vietnam established diplomatic and economic relations with Association of Southeast Asian Nations (ASEAN) member states and also with most countries of Western Europe and Asia's Far East. China re-established full diplomatic ties with Vietnam in 1991. The two nations concluded a land border demarcation agreement in 1999. In 1995, the US and Vietnam re-established diplomatic ties. United States–Vietnam relations improved in August 1995, when both nations upgraded their liaison offices opened during January 1995 to embassy status, with the United States later opening a consulate general in Ho Chi Minh City, and Vietnam opening a consulate in San Francisco.

In 2001, Vietnam signed 16 free trade agreements.

Full diplomatic relations were restored with New Zealand who opened its embassy in Hanoi in 1995, while Vietnam established an embassy in Wellington in 2003. Pakistan reopened its embassy in Hanoi in October 2000. Vietnam also reopened its embassy in Islamabad in December 2005 and trade office in Karachi in November 2005.

In the past decade, Vietnam has recognized the importance of growing global economic interdependence and has made concerted efforts to adjust its foreign relations to reflect the evolving international economic and political situation in Southeast Asia. The country has begun to integrate itself into the regional and global economy by joining international organizations. Vietnam has stepped up its efforts to attract foreign capital from the West and regularize relations with the world financial system. In the 1990s, following the lifting of the US veto on multilateral loans to the country, Vietnam became a member of the World Bank, the International Monetary Fund (IMF), and the Asian Development Bank. The country has expanded trade with its East Asian neighbors as well as with countries in Western Europe and North America. Of particular significance was Vietnam's acceptance into ASEAN in July 1995. Vietnam joined the Asia-Pacific Economic Cooperation forum (APEC) in November 1998 and also hosted the ASEAN summit the following month. In 2005, Vietnam attended the inaugural East Asia Summit. Vietnam became a member of the World Trade Organization in November 2006.

== Current issues ==
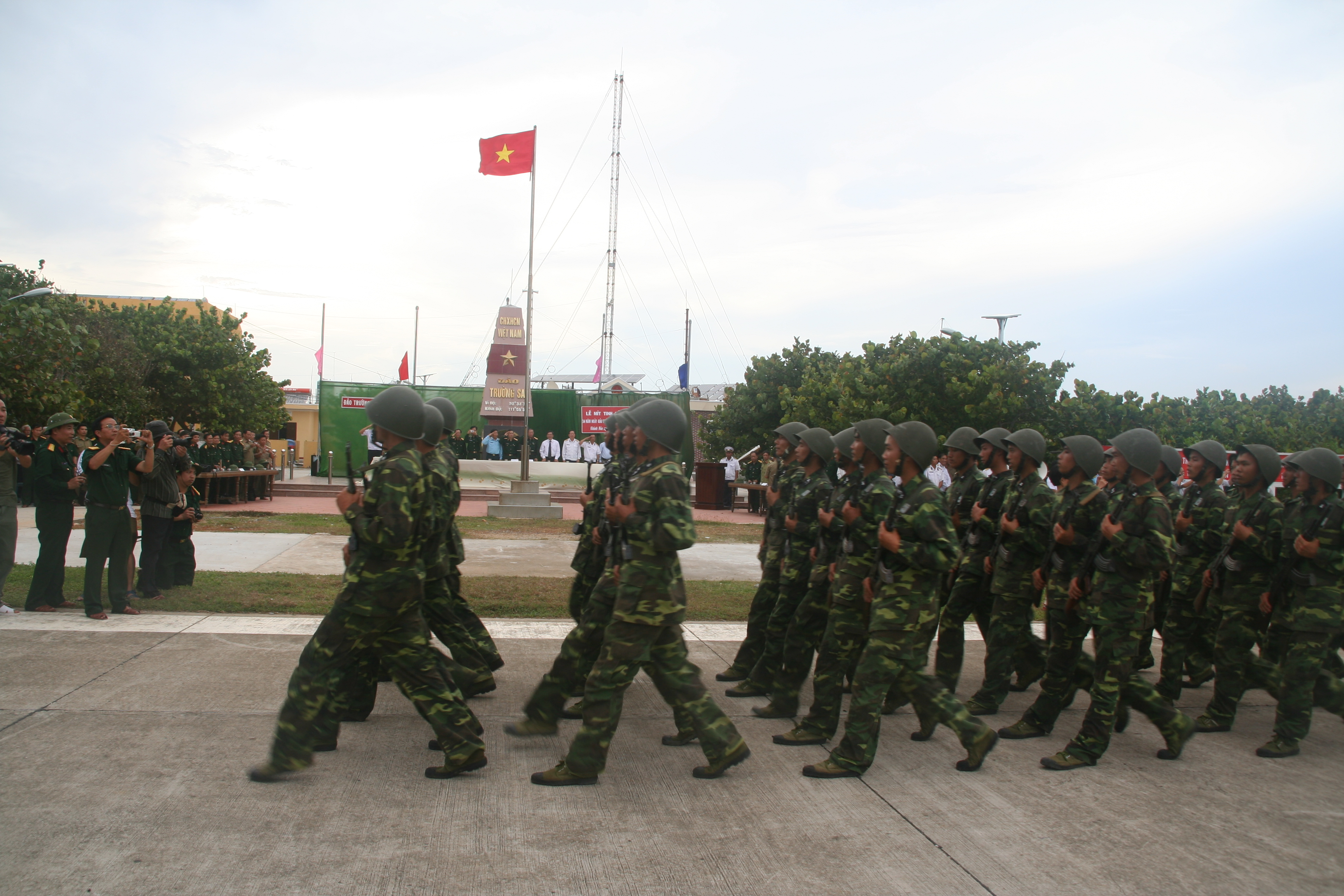
Vietnamese troops on Spratly Island

In 2011 the Central Committee of the Communist Party of Vietnam, at the 11th National Congress of the Communist Party of Vietnam, released an official statement about Vietnam's foreign policy and a section of the statement stated: "Vietnam is a friend and reliable partner of all countries in the international community, actively taking part in international and regional cooperation processes. Deepen, stabilize and sustain established international relations. Develop relations with countries and territories in the world, as well as international organizations, while showing: respect for each other's independence; sovereignty and territorial integrity; non-interference in each other's international affairs; non-use or threat of force; settlement of disagreements and disputes by means of peaceful negotiations; mutual respect, equality and mutual benefit."

While Vietnam has remained relatively conflict-free since its Cambodia days, tensions have arisen in the past between Vietnam and its neighbors, especially in the case of China since both nations assert claims to the Spratly and Paracel Islands - the two archipelagos in a potentially oil-rich area of the South China Sea. Conflicting claims have produced over the years small scale armed altercations in the area. In 1988, more than 70 Vietnamese troops were killed during a confrontation with Chinese forces, when China occupied several islands under Vietnamese control in the Spratly Islands. China's assertion of control over the Spratly Islands and the entire South China Sea has elicited concern from Vietnam and its Southeast Asia neighbors. The territorial border between the two countries is being definitively mapped pursuant to a Land Border Agreement signed in December 1999, and an Agreement on Borders in the Gulf of Tonkin signed in December 2000. Vietnam and Russia declared a strategic partnership in March 2001 during the first visit ever to Hanoi of a Russian head of state, largely as an attempt to counterbalance China's growing profile in Southeast Asia.

Disputes – international: maritime boundary with Cambodia not defined; involved in a complex dispute over the Spratly - Paracel Islands with the People's Republic of China (PRC), Malaysia, Philippines, and possibly Brunei; maritime boundary with Thailand resolved in August 1997; maritime boundary dispute with the PRC in the Gulf of Tonkin resolved in 2000; Paracel Islands occupied by the PRC since 1974; offshore islands and sections of boundary with Cambodia are in dispute; agreement on land border with the People's Republic of China was signed in December 1999.

Illicit drugs: minor producer of opium poppy with 21 km^{2} cultivated in 1999, capable of producing 11 metric tons of opium; probably minor transit point for Southeast Asian heroin destined for the US and Europe; growing opium/heroin addiction; possible small-scale heroin production.

== Diplomatic relations ==
List of countries which Vietnam maintains diplomatic relations with:

#	Country	Date
1	China	18 January 1950
2	Russia	30 January 1950
3	North Korea	31 January 1950
4	Czech Republic	2 February 1950
5	Hungary	3 February 1950
6	Romania	3 February 1950
7	Poland	4 February 1950
8	Bulgaria	8 February 1950
9	Albania	11 February 1950
10	Mongolia	17 November 1954
11	Indonesia	30 December 1955
12	Serbia	10 March 1957
13	Guinea	9 October 1958
14	Mali	30 October 1960
15	Cuba	2 December 1960
16	Morocco	27 March 1961
17	Democratic Republic of the Congo	13 April 1961
18	Laos	5 September 1962
19	Algeria	28 October 1962
20	Egypt	1 September 1963
21	Yemen	16 October 1963
22	Republic of the Congo	16 July 1964
23	Tanzania	14 February 1965
24	Mauritania	15 March 1965
25	Ghana	25 March 1965
26	Syria	21 July 1966
27	Cambodia	24 June 1967
28	Iraq	10 July 1968
29	Sweden	11 January 1969
30	Sudan	26 August 1969
31	Senegal	29 December 1969
32	Somalia	7 June 1970
33	Sri Lanka	21 July 1970
34	Chile	25 March 1971
35	Switzerland	11 October 1971
36	Denmark	25 November 1971
37	Norway	25 November 1971
38	India	7 January 1972
39	Cameroon	30 August 1972
40	Equatorial Guinea	1 September 1972
41	Zambia	15 September 1972
42	Pakistan	8 November 1972
43	Austria	1 December 1972
44	Tunisia	15 December 1972
45	Madagascar	19 December 1972
46	Finland	25 January 1973
47	Uganda	9 February 1973
48	Bangladesh	11 February 1973
49	Australia	26 February 1973
50	Benin	14 March 1973
51	Belgium	22 March 1973
52	Italy	23 March 1973
53	Malaysia	30 March 1973
54	Netherlands	9 April 1973
55	France	12 April 1973
56	Burundi	16 April 1973
57	Singapore	1 August 1973
58	Iran	4 August 1973
59	Iceland	5 August 1973
60	Canada	21 August 1973
61	United Kingdom	11 September 1973
62	Japan	21 September 1973
63	Guinea-Bissau	30 September 1973
64	Argentina	25 October 1973
65	Gambia	30 October 1973
66	Luxembourg	15 November 1973
67	Burkina Faso	16 November 1973
68	Malta	14 January 1974
69	Afghanistan	16 September 1974
70	Gabon	9 January 1975
71	Togo	8 February 1975
72	Niger	7 March 1975
73	Libya	15 March 1975
74	Greece	15 April 1975
75	Guyana	19 April 1975
76	Nepal	15 May 1975
77	Mexico	19 May 1975
78	Myanmar	28 May 1975
79	Maldives	18 June 1975
80	New Zealand	19 June 1975
81	Mozambique	25 June 1975
82	Portugal	1 July 1975
83	Cape Verde	8 July 1975
84	Panama	28 August 1975
85	Germany	23 September 1975
86	Rwanda	30 September 1975
87	Ivory Coast	6 October 1975
88	Angola	12 November 1975
89	Cyprus	1 December 1975
90	Jamaica	5 January 1976
91	Kuwait	10 January 1976
92	Ethiopia	23 February 1976
93	Costa Rica	24 April 1976
94	Nigeria	25 May 1976
95	Philippines	12 July 1976
96	Thailand	6 August 1976
97	São Tomé and Príncipe	6 November 1976
98	Spain	23 May 1977
99	Turkey	7 June 1978
100	Sierra Leone	24 June 1978
101	Colombia	1 January 1979
—	Sahrawi Arab Democratic Republic	2 March 1979
102	Grenada	15 July 1979
103	Seychelles	16 August 1979
104	Nicaragua	3 September 1979
105	Ecuador	1 January 1980
106	Jordan	19 August 1980
107	Lebanon	12 February 1981
108	Zimbabwe	24 July 1981
109	Chad	5 October 1981
110	Vanuatu	3 March 1982
111	Bolivia	10 February 1987
—	State of Palestine	19 November 1988
112	Brazil	8 May 1989
113	Papua New Guinea	3 November 1989
114	Venezuela	18 December 1989
115	Namibia	21 March 1990
116	Djibouti	30 April 1991
117	Uzbekistan	17 January 1992
118	Ukraine	23 January 1992
119	Belarus	24 January 1992
120	Latvia	12 February 1992
121	Estonia	20 February 1992
122	Brunei	29 February 1992
123	Lithuania	18 March 1992
124	Kyrgyzstan	4 June 1992
125	Oman	9 June 1992
126	Moldova	11 June 1992
127	Kazakhstan	29 June 1992
128	Georgia	30 June 1992
129	Marshall Islands	1 July 1992
130	Armenia	14 July 1992
131	Tajikistan	14 July 1992
132	Turkmenistan	29 July 1992
133	Azerbaijan	23 September 1992
134	South Korea	22 December 1992
135	Slovakia	1 January 1993
136	Guatemala	7 January 1993
137	Qatar	8 February 1993
138	Fiji	14 May 1993
139	Israel	12 July 1993
140	Eritrea	20 July 1993
141	United Arab Emirates	1 August 1993
142	Uruguay	11 August 1993
143	South Africa	22 December 1993
144	Samoa	9 March 1994
145	Mauritius	4 May 1994
146	Slovenia	7 June 1994
147	North Macedonia	10 June 1994
148	Croatia	1 July 1994
149	Peru	14 November 1994
150	Belize	4 January 1995
151	Bahrain	31 March 1995
152	Paraguay	30 May 1995
153	United States	12 July 1995
154	Barbados	25 August 1995
155	Federated States of Micronesia	22 September 1995
156	Saint Vincent and the Grenadines	18 December 1995
157	Kenya	21 December 1995
158	Bosnia and Herzegovina	26 January 1996
159	Ireland	5 April 1996
160	Solomon Islands	30 October 1996
161	Haiti	26 September 1997
162	Suriname	19 December 1997
163	Lesotho	6 January 1998
164	Saudi Arabia	21 October 1999
165	Timor-Leste	28 July 2002
166	Honduras	17 May 2005
167	Dominican Republic	7 July 2005
168	Nauru	21 June 2006
169	Montenegro	4 August 2006
170	Andorra	12 June 2007
171	San Marino	6 July 2007
172	Monaco	29 November 2007
173	Liechtenstein	2 July 2008
174	Palau	18 August 2008
175	Central African Republic	10 November 2008
176	Botswana	11 February 2009
177	El Salvador	16 January 2010
178	Bhutan	19 January 2012
179	Eswatini	21 May 2013
180	Dominica	1 November 2013
181	Saint Kitts and Nevis	1 November 2013
182	Antigua and Barbuda	8 November 2013
183	Kiribati	15 September 2014
184	Comoros	24 September 2015
185	Liberia	28 June 2016
186	Saint Lucia	26 June 2018
187	South Sudan	21 February 2019
—	Cook Islands	26 April 2022
188	Bahamas	6 January 2023
189	Trinidad and Tobago	1 February 2023
190	Tonga	21 September 2023
191	Malawi	23 September 2024
192	Tuvalu	24 September 2025

== Bilateral relations ==
=== Africa ===
Country	Formal relations began	Notes
Algeria		See Algeria–Vietnam relations: Algeria has an embassy in Hanoi.; Vietnam has an embassy in Algiers.
Angola		See Angola–Vietnam relations: Angola has an embassy in Hanoi.; Vietnam has an embassy in Luanda.
Kenya	21 December 1995	See Kenya–Vietnam relations: Kenya is accredited to Vietnam through its embassy in Bangkok, Thailand.; Vietnam's embassy in Tanzania is accredited to Kenya.
Libya	15 March 1975	See Libya–Vietnam relations: Both countries established diplomatic relations on 15 March 1975.; Libya has an embassy in Hanoi.; Vietnam is accredited to Libya from its embassy in Cairo, Egypt.
Tanzania	14 February 1965	See Tanzania–Vietnam relations

=== Americas ===
Country	Formal relations began	Notes
Argentina	1973-10-25	Since December 1996, Argentina has an embassy in Hanoi.; Since January 1995, Vietnam has an embassy in Buenos Aires.; Argentine Ministry of Foreign Relations: list of bilateral treaties with Vietnam (in Spanish only); Vietnamese Ministry of Foreign Affairs about relations with Argentina
Canada	1973-08-21	See Canada–Vietnam relations: Canada maintains an embassy in Hanoi and a consulate general in Ho Chi Minh City.; Vietnam has an embassy in Ottawa and a consulate general in Vancouver.
Chile		See Chile–Vietnam relations: Chile has an embassy in Hanoi.; Vietnam has an embassy in Santiago.; Bilateral trade between Chile and Vietnam, Chile recorded a trade deficit of $898 million, with exports to Vietnam reaching $290 million and imports from Vietnam totaling $1.19 billion.
Colombia	1 January 1979	Colombia has an embassy in Hanoi.; Vietnam is accredited to Colombia from its embassy in Caracas, Venezuela.; Bilateral trade between the two nations has grown steadily, with key exports including Colombian coffee, flowers, and emeralds, alongside Vietnamese electronics and textiles.
Cuba	1960-12-02	See Cuba–Vietnam relations: Cuba has an embassy in Hanoi.; Vietnam has an embassy in Havana.
Guyana	19 April 1975	Both countries established diplomatic relations on 19 April 1975.; Economic and commercial relations are very limited.
Mexico	1975-07-15	See Mexico–Vietnam relations: Mexico has an embassy in Hanoi.; Vietnam has an embassy in Mexico City.
Panama	28 August 1975	Panama has an embassy in Hanoi and a consulate-general in Ho Chi Minh City; Vietnam is accredited to Panama from its embassy in Mexico City, Mexico.
Paraguay	30 May 1995	Paraguay is accredited to Vietnam from embassy in Tokyo, Japan.; Vietnam is accredited to Paraguay from its embassy in Buenos Aires, Argentina.
Peru		See Peru–Vietnam relations: Peru has an embassy in Hanoi.; Vietnam is accredited to Peru from its embassy in Brasília, Brazil.
United States	1995-07-11	See United States–Vietnam relations: United States has an embassy in Hanoi and a consulate-general in Ho Chi Minh City.; Vietnam has an embassy in Washington, D.C., and consulates-general in Houston, New York City and San Francisco.
Uruguay		See Uruguay–Vietnam relations: Uruguay has an embassy in Hanoi.; Vietnam is accredited to Uruguay from its embassy in Buenos Aires, Argentina.; Bilateral trade between Vietnam and Uruguay, Vietnam recorded a trade surplus of $58.1 million, with exports totaling $108 million and imports valued at $50.2 million.
Venezuela	1989-12-18	See Venezuela–Vietnam relations Vietnam has an embassy in Caracas and Venezuela an embassy in Hanoi. Though bilateral trade was $11.7 million in 2007 relations show "great potential". Over the past ten years, the two countries have witnessed new developments in various fields, including politics, economics, culture and society, particularly in the oil and gas industry. Vietnamese President Nguyễn Minh Triết arrived in Caracas on 18 November for a two-day official visit on an invitation from Hugo Chávez. Triet hailed Vietnam's friendship with Venezuela as he sought to focus on tying up oil and gas deals, including a joint development fund. He said that "We (Vietnamese) are grateful for the support and solidarity that they (Venezuelans) have offered us until now." Triết said. Since Hugo Chávez's visit to Vietnam in 2006, his government stepped up bilateral relations with the country, which also included a visit by the Communist Party general secretary, Nông Đức Mạnh in 2007. Petróleos de Venezuela and Petrovietnam also announced a number of joint projects since the 2006 visit, including Petrovietnam's was given a concession in the Orinoco basin and an agreement to transport Venezuelan oil to Vietnam, where the two would together build an oil refinery that Vietnam lacks. On the 2006 visit, Chávez praised Vietnam's revolutionary history as he attacked the United States for its "imperialist" crimes in the Vietnam War. On the 2008 visit Triết returned similar comments as he lauded a group of Venezuelans who captured a US soldier during the Vietnam war in an unsuccessful bid to prevent the execution of a Vietnamese revolutionary. The two leaders also signed a deal for a $200 million joint fund and 15 cooperation projects. In March 2008 an agreement was signed to cooperate in tourism between Vietnam and Venezuela. President Nguyễn Minh Triết received the PDVSA's vice president Asdrubal Chavez and stated that oil and gas cooperation would become a typical example of their multi-faceted cooperation. In 2009 the Venezuelan government approved $46.5 million for an agricultural development project with Vietnam.

=== Asia ===
Country	Formal relations began	Notes
Afghanistan	16 September 1974	Vietnam had an embassy in Kabul from 1978 to 1992.
Armenia	14 July 1992	Diplomatic relations between Armenia and Vietnam were established on 14 July 1992.; Vietnam is represented in Armenia through its embassy in Moscow, Russia.; Armenia has an embassy in Hanoi.
Bangladesh	2 November 1973	See Bangladesh–Vietnam relations
Brunei	29 February 1992	See Brunei–Vietnam relations Brunei has an embassy in Hanoi, and Vietnam has an embassy in Bandar Seri Begawan.
Cambodia	24 June 1967	See Cambodia–Vietnam relations Since the 1990s, relations between these nations have been improving. Both countries are members of multilateral regional organizations ASEAN and the Mekong–Ganga Cooperation. Both have opened and developed cross-border trade and sought to relax visa regulations to that end. Both governments have set official targets of increasing bilateral trade by 27% to US$2.3 billion by 2010 and to $6.5 billion by 2015. Vietnam exported US$1.2 billion worth of goods to Cambodia in 2007. While Cambodia is only the 16th largest importer of Vietnamese goods, Vietnam is Cambodia's third-largest export market.: Cambodia has an embassy in Hanoi and a consulate-general in Ho Chi Minh City.; Vietnam has an embassy in Phnom Penh and consulates-general in Battambang and Sihanoukville.
China	960 (Song); 18 January 1950 (PRC)	See China–Vietnam relations Countries which signed cooperation documents related to the Belt and Road Initiative After both sides resumed trade links in 1991, growth in bilateral trade has increased from US$32 million in 1991 to almost $7.2 billion by 2004. Both governments have set the target of increasing trade volume to US$10 billion by 2010. Vietnam's exports to China include crude oil, coal, coffee and food, while China exports pharmaceuticals, machinery, petroleum, fertilizers and automobile parts to Vietnam. China has become Vietnam's second-largest trading partner and the largest source of imports. Both nations are working to establish an "economic corridor" from China's Yunnan to Vietnam's northern provinces and cities, and similar economic zones in the Gulf of Tonkin and connecting the Nanning of Guangxi province, Lang Son province, Hanoi, Haiphong and Quang Ninh province of Vietnam. Air and sea transport as well as railway have been opened between the two countries, so have the 7 pairs of national-level ports in the frontier provinces and regions of the two countries. Both sides have also launched joint ventures such as the Thai Nguyen Steel Complex, which produces hundreds of thousands of tonnes of steel products.: China has an embassy in Hanoi and a consulates-general in Da Nang and Ho Chi Minh City.; Vietnam has an embassy in Beijing and consulates-general in Guangzhou, Hong Kong, Kunming, Nanning and Shanghai.
India	7/1/1972	See India–Vietnam relations India and Vietnam are members of the Mekong–Ganga Cooperation, created to develop to enhance close ties between India and nations of Southeast Asia. Vietnam has supported India's bid to become a permanent member of the U.N. Security Council and join the Asia-Pacific Economic Cooperation (APEC). In the 2003 joint declaration, India and Vietnam envisaged creating an "Arc of Advantage and Prosperity" in Southeast Asia; to this end, Vietnam has backed a more important relationship and role between India and the Association of Southeast Asian Nations (ASEAN) and its negotiation of an Indo-ASEAN free trade agreement. India and Vietnam have also built strategic partnerships, including extensive cooperation on developing nuclear power, enhancing regional security and fighting terrorism, transnational crime and drug trafficking.
Indonesia	30 December 1955	See Indonesia–Vietnam relations: Vietnam and Indonesia are both members of (ASEAN), the Association of Southeast Asian Nations.; President Megawati Sukarnoputri of Indonesia visited Vietnam in June 2003. At this time the two countries signed a "Declaration on the Framework of Friendly and Comprehensive Cooperation Entering the 21st Century".; In May 2005 President Susilo Bambang Yudhoyono of Indonesia visited Vietnam. In the December of the same year festivities were organized in the respective capital cities to celebrate the 50th anniversary of the establishment of diplomatic ties. Due to the ongoing South China Sea disputes, both Vietnam and Indonesia has supported a restraint in militarizing the issue. China claims the EEZ of the Natuna Island of Indonesia, while it also claims most of the South China Sea including the Vietnam-claimed Paracel and Spratly islands.
Iran	4 August 1973	See Iran–Vietnam relations
Iraq	10 July 1968	See Iraq–Vietnam relations: Since December 1969, Iraq has an embassy in Hanoi.; Vietnam is accredited to Iraq from its embassy in Tehran, Iran.
Israel	12 July 1993	See Israel–Vietnam relations: Since December 1993, Israel has an embassy in Hanoi.; Vietnam has an embassy in Tel Aviv.; See also History of the Jews in Vietnam; Vietnamese Ministry of Foreign Affairs about relations with Israel
Japan	1605 (Tokugawa shogunate); 21 September 1973	See Japan-Vietnam relations: Lord Nguyễn Hoàng started to send national letter to Tokugawa Ieyasu to invite Japanese merchant to come to Hội An in 1605; Prince Cường Để exiled in Japan in 1905; Việt Nam Duy Tân Hội (Vietnam Modernization Association) created in 1904 by Phan Bội Châu, The Vietnamese nationalist who wished to bring his people to Japan to study through Đông Du Movement; Empire of Japan invaded French Indochina in 1940; Surrender of Japan in 1945; Both nation established relation on 21 September 1973; Following 23 October 1991 Final Act of the International Paris Conference on Cambodia among the Cambodian parties, Indonesia (as co-chair with France), and the five permanent members of the United Nations Security Council, Japan promptly established diplomatic relations and ended economic restrictions with Cambodia and Vietnam. In November 1992, Tokyo offered Vietnam US$370 million in aid. Japan also took a leading role in peacekeeping activities in Cambodia. Japan's Akashi Yasushi, UN Undersecretary General for Disarmament, was head of the UN Transitional Authority in Cambodia, and Japan pledged US$3 million and even sent approximately 2,000 personnel, including members of the SDF, to participate directly in maintaining the peace. Despite the loss of a Japanese peacekeeper killed in an ambush, the force remained in Cambodia until the Cambodians were able to elect and install a government.; Japan is the single biggest country donor to Vietnam. It has pledged US$890 million in aid for the country this year, or 6.5 percent higher than the 2006 level of $US 835.6 million.
Laos	5/9/1962	See Laos-Vietnam relations Although Vietnam's historical record of leadership in the revolution and its military power and proximity will not cease to exist, Laos struck out ahead of Vietnam with its New Economic Mechanism to introduce market mechanisms into its economy. In so doing, Laos has opened the door to rapprochement with Thailand and China at some expense to its special dependence on Vietnam. Laos might have reached the same point of normalization in following Vietnam's economic and diplomatic change, but by moving ahead resolutely and responding to Thai and Chinese gestures, Laos has broadened its range of donors, trading partners, and investors independent of Vietnam's attempts to accomplish the same goal. Thus, Vietnam remains in the shadows as a mentor and emergency ally, and the tutelage of Laos has shifted dramatically to development banks and international entrepreneurs.: Laos has an embassy in Hanoi and a consulates-general in Da Nang and Ho Chi Minh City.; Vietnam has an embassy in Vientiane and consulates-general in Luang Prabang, Pakse and Savannakhet
Malaysia	30 March 1973	See Malaysia-Vietnam relations: Vietnam has an embassy in Kuala Lumpur; Malaysia has an embassy in Hanoi and consulate-general in Ho Chi Minh City.
Mongolia	1280 (Yuan dynasty); 17 November 1954	See Mongolia–Vietnam relations The countries signed a Friendship and Cooperation Treaty in 1961, renewed it in 1979, and signed a new one in 1995. On 13 January 2003, the countries signed an 8-point cooperative document committing to cooperation between the two governments and their legislative bodies, replacing an earlier document signed in 1998. There have been 13 sessions of the Vietnam-Mongolia inter-governmental committee on cooperation in trade, economics and sci-tech, with the next to be held in Ulaanbaatar in 2010. On 25 May 2004 in Ulaanbaatar, the countries signed agreements on railway transport and scientific and technological cooperation. Other agreements have covered areas such as plant protection and quarantine regulations, customs, health and education.
Myanmar	28 May 1975	See Myanmar-Vietnam relations: Myanmar has an embassy in Hanoi.; Vietnam has an embassy in Yangon.
North Korea	1226 (Goryeo); 31 January 1950	See North Korea–Vietnam relations: Prince Lý Long Tường of the Lý dynasty fled and exiled in Kingdom of Goryeo in 1226 to avoid the execution of the Trần dynasty; Both had some meetings when both of them sent envoys to pay tribute to China Empire.; North Korea recognised Communist ally North Vietnam on 31 January 1950; In July 1957, President Ho Chi Minh visited North Korea; North Korean leader Kim Il-sung visited North Vietnam in November–December 1958 and November 1964.; In February 1961, the two governments concluded an agreement on scientific and technical cooperation.; President Kim Il Sung sent some fighter squadron to North Vietnam to back up the North Vietnamese 921st and 923rd fighter squadrons defending Hanoi while Hanoi was bombed by The US air forces.; From 1950 to 1960s, students from North Vietnam began studying in North Korea as early as the 1960s.; Relations later declined due to investment and trade disputes in the 1990s and 2000s and emerging relationship between South Korea and Vietnam
Pakistan	8 November 1972	See Pakistan–Vietnam relations Pakistan opened its embassy in Hanoi in 1973. However, due to economic reasons, Pakistan closed the embassy in 1980. Vietnam also opened its embassy in Islamabad in 1978 and had to close it down in 1984 due to its own economic difficulty. Bilateral relations between Pakistan and Vietnam in recent years have considerably improved. Both countries' leaders expressed their willingness to strengthen their existing relations, not only in the political sphere but also in other areas such as trade and economics, and exchange more visits from one to another's country, including both high-ranking and working visits. Pakistan reopened its embassy in Hanoi in October 2000. Vietnam also reopened its embassy in Islamabad in December 2005 and trade office in Karachi in November 2005.
Philippines	12 July 1976	See Philippines–Vietnam relations Ever since the end of the Cold War relations between the Philippines and Vietnam has warmed rapidly. Today the Philippines and Vietnam are economic allies and have a free trade deal with each other. Both nations are a part of Association of Southeast Asian Nations (ASEAN) and Asia-Pacific Economic Cooperation (APEC). The Philippines and Vietnam have conducted joint military exercises together in the South China Sea and are trying to find ways to turn the Spratly Islands from an area of conflict to an area of cooperation. Vietnam is also sometimes called the only communist military ally of the Philippines. The Philippines and Vietnam are also monitoring China's expansion into the South China Sea making sure that China is no threat to either Philippine or Vietnamese islands in the South China Sea. The Philippines also imports a large amount of writing material, clothes and other products from Vietnam. In May 2009, The Philippines has inked an agreement with Vietnam to cooperate in the fight against crimes and ensuring social order. In January 2010, the Philippine Stock Exchange (PSE) has signed a memorandum of understanding with the Vietnam bourse "for mutual collaboration and communication of information and experience" to facilitate the development and efficient operations of both securities markets. In 2012, Vietnam sent two military assets for a good will visit to the Philippines. Both Vietnam and the Philippines have the same stand on the South China Sea disputes, patronizing multilateral talks and international court rulings to solve the issue, tactics which China has avoided. In 2016, the Philippines strengthened its stand on the dispute through a court ruling in an international court not associated with UN and poised to create stronger relations with Vietnam for strategic defense and economic cooperation.
Qatar	8 February 1993	See Qatar–Vietnam relations: Qatar has an embassy in Hanoi.; Vietnam has an embassy in Doha.
Saudi Arabia		See Saudi Arabia–Vietnam relations: Saudi Arabia has an embassy in Hanoi.; Vietnam has an embassy in Riyadh.; In bilateral trade between Vietnam and Saudi Arabia, Vietnam recorded a trade surplus of $2.43 billion, with exports totaling $3.08 billion and imports valued at $644 million.
Singapore	1 August 1973	See Singapore–Vietnam relations: Singapore has an embassy in Hanoi.; Vietnam has an embassy in Singapore.
South Korea	1226 (Goryeo); 22 December 1992	See South Korea–Vietnam relations History: Prince Lý Long Tường of the Lý dynasty fled and exiled in Kingdom of Goryeo in 1226 to avoid the execution of the Trần dynasty; Both had some meetings when both of them sent envoys to pay tribute to China Empire.; South Korea recognised Capitalist ally South Vietnam; President Park Chung Hee sent ROK troops to fight in Vietnam war in 1960s.; The establishment of diplomatic relations between the Socialist Republic of Vietnam and the Republic of Korea started on 22 December 1992.: 1994 August Prime Minister Lee Young-deok; 1996 November President Kim Young-sam; 1998 December President Kim Dae-jung; 2002 April Prime Minister Lee Han-dong; 2004 October President Roh Moo-hyun; 2006 January Speaker of National Assembly Kim Won-ki; 2006 November President Roh Moo-hyun (APEC); 2008 April Speaker of National Assembly Lim Chae-jung; 2009 May Presidential Envoy Lee Byung-suk; 2009 October President Lee Myung-bak; 2009 November Speaker of National Assembly Kim Hyong-o; 2010 October President Lee Myung-bak; 2013 January Speaker of National Assembly Kang Chang Hee; 2013 September President Park Geun-hye(G20).
Taiwan	960 (Song) unofficial relation (Now)	see Taiwan–Vietnam relations: Taiwan had full relation with former South Vietnam; Taiwan–Vietnam relations are conducted on an unofficial level, as Hanoi adheres to a one-China policy and officially recognises the People's Republic of China only. However, this has not stopped bilateral visits and significant flows of migrants and investment capital between Taiwan and Vietnam. Taiwan has been the largest source of foreign direct investment in Vietnam since 2006. Both countries maintain representative offices; Taiwan is represented by branches of the Taipei Economic and Cultural Office in Hanoi and Ho Chi Minh City, while Vietnam is represented by the Vietnam Economic and Cultural Office in Taipei.
Thailand	6/8/1976	See Thailand–Vietnam relations: Thailand has an embassy in Hanoi and a consulate-general in Ho Chi Minh City.; Vietnam has an embassy in Bangkok and a consulate-general in Khon Kaen.
Turkey	1978	See Turkey–Vietnam relations: Vietnam has an embassy in Ankara.; Turkey has an embassy in Hanoi.; Trade volume between the two countries was US$1.912 billion in 2015 (Viet exports/imports: 1.76/0.16 billion USD).; There are direct flights from Istanbul to Hanoi and Ho Chi Minh City since 27 June 2016.
United Arab Emirates	1 August 1993	See United Arab Emirates–Vietnam relations: United Arab Emirates has an embassy in Hanoi.; Vietnam has an embassy in Abu Dhabi.; In October 2024, both nations elevated their bilateral relationship by signing a Comprehensive Economic Partnership Agreement (CEPA).; In 2025, total non-oil bilateral trade between Vietnam and the United Arab Emirates reached US$16.05 billion, representing a 27.4% year-on-year increase from US$12.6 billion in 2024.

=== Europe ===
Country	Formal relations began	Notes
EU	1990	See Vietnam–European Union relations
Austria	1 December 1972	See Austria–Vietnam relations: Austria has an embassy in Hanoi.; Vietnam has an embassy in Vienna.
Belarus	24 January 1992	See Belarus–Vietnam relations: Since 1997, Belarus has an embassy in Hanoi.; Since November 2003, Vietnam has an embassy in Minsk.
Bulgaria	8 February 1950	See Bulgaria–Vietnam relations: Bulgaria has an embassy in Hanoi.; Vietnam has an embassy in Sofia.; In 2006, the Bulgarian Government agreed to a healthcare cooperation plan with Vietnam. The two-year plan includes cooperation in many areas, mainly in public healthcare, inpatient and outpatient help, food security, medical education.
Czech Republic	2 February 1950 (as Czechoslovakia)	See Czech Republic–Vietnam relations: The Czech Republic has an embassy in Hanoi.; Vietnam has an embassy in Prague.
Denmark	25 November 1971	See Denmark–Vietnam relations: Since 1 April 1994, Denmark has an embassy in Hanoi.; Since 12 August 2000, Vietnam has an embassy in Copenhagen.; There are around 8,500 Vietnamese living in Denmark.; June 2002, Nguyễn Dy Niên, Vietnamese Foreign Minister, visited Denmark; October 2004, Per Stig Møller Danish Minister of Foreign Affairs attended the 5th Asia–Europe Meeting in Hanoi; March 2007, Ulrik Federspiel Secretary of State for Foreign Affair visited Vietnam; Vietnamese Ministry of Foreign Affairs about relations with Denmark
Finland		See Finland–Vietnam relations: Finland has an embassy in Hanoi.; Vietnam has an embassy in Helsinki.
France	12 April 1973	See France–Vietnam relations: France has an embassy in Hanoi and a consulate-general in Ho Chi Minh City.; Vietnam has an embassy in Paris.
Germany	3 February 1955 (with East Germany and unified Germany); 23 September 1975 (with West Germany)	See Germany–Vietnam relations: Germany has an embassy in Hanoi.; Vietnam has an embassy in Berlin and a consulate-general in Frankfurt.
Greece	15 April 1975	See Greece–Vietnam relations: Greece has an embassy in Hanoi.; Vietnam has an embassy in Athens.
Holy See	No relation	See Holy See–Vietnam relations
Hungary	3 February 1950	See Hungary–Vietnam relations: Hungary has an embassy in Hanoi.; Vietnam has an embassy in Budapest.
Italy	23 March 1973	See Italy–Vietnam relations: Italy has an embassy in Hanoi and a consulate-general in Ho Chi Minh City.; Vietnam has an embassy in Rome.
Luxembourg	15 November 1973	See Luxembourg–Vietnam relations: Luxembourg is represented in Vietnam through its embassy in Beijing, China.; Vietnam is represented in Luxembourg through its embassy in Brussels, Belgium.
North Macedonia	10 June 1994	The countries established diplomatic relations on 10 June 1994.; North Macedonia is represented in Vietnam through its embassy in Beijing, China.; Vietnam is represented in North Macedonia through its embassy in Sofia, Bulgaria.
Poland	4 February 1950	See Poland–Vietnam relations: Poland has an embassy in Hanoi.; Vietnam has an embassy in Warsaw.; The two countries celebrated the 75th anniversary of their diplomatic relations in 2025, highlighting strong historical ties.
Portugal	1 July 1975	In 2015 both countries are celebrating 500 years of relations, remembering 1515 when the Portuguese traveler Duarte Coelho reached Cochinchina, Champa and Tonkin starting a long period of trading relations with the Portuguese established in Macau and in Malacca.; Portugal is accredited to Vietnam from its embassy in Bangkok, Thailand and has honorary consulates both in Hanoi (31 Pho Duc Chinh, Truc Bach Ward, Ba Dinh District, Ha noi) and in Ho Chi Minh City (66/11 Pham Ngoc Thach, Q3, Ho Chi Minh); Vietnam is accredited to Portugal from its embassy in Paris, France.
Russia	30 January 1950 (as USSR); Russia (now)	See Russia–Vietnam relations: USSR was an ally of Vietnam.; On 30 January 1950 the Union of Soviet Socialist Republics established an embassy to North Vietnam. The USSR was traditionally one of Vietnam's strongest allies.
Serbia	10 March 1957 (as SFR Yugoslavia)	Serbia is represented in Vietnam through its embassy in Jakarta (Indonesia).; Vietnam is represented in Serbia through its embassy in Bucharest (Romania).; Vietnam supports Serbia in Kosovo issue.; Serbian Ministry of Foreign Affairs about the relation with Vietnam; Vietnamese Ministry of Foreign Affairs about the relation with Serbia
Slovakia	2/2/1950 (as Czechoslovakia)	See Slovakia–Vietnam relations: Slovakia has an embassy in Hanoi.; Vietnam has an embassy in Bratislava.
Spain	23 May 1977	See Spain–Vietnam relations: Spain has an embassy in Hanoi.; Vietnam has an embassy in Madrid.
Ukraine	23 January 1992	See Ukraine–Vietnam relations: Ukraine has an embassy in Hanoi.; Vietnam has an embassy in Kyiv.
United Kingdom	11 September 1973	See United Kingdom–Vietnam relations Vietnamese Foreign Minister Bùi Thanh Sơn with British Foreign Secretary David Lammy in Kuala Lumpur, July 2025. Vietnam established diplomatic relations with the United Kingdom on 11 September 1973.: Vietnam maintains an embassy in London.; The UK is accredited to Vietnam through its embassy in Hanoi, and a Consulate General in Ho Chi Minh City.; The UK occupied Southern Vietnam and Saigon from 1945–1946. Both countries share common membership of CPTPP, the United Nations, and the World Trade Organization. Bilaterally the two countries have a Double Taxation Agreement, a Free Trade Agreement, an Investment Agreement, and a Strategic Partnership.

=== Oceania ===
Country	Formal relations began	Notes
Australia	26 February 1973	See Australia–Vietnam relations: Australian prime ministers Paul Keating and John Howard have visited Vietnam, in 1994 and 2006 respectively.; In the fiscal year 2006–2007 Australia Overseas Development Aid was 81.5million A$.; In 2006, the volume of bilateral trade was 4.75 US$ billion.; Australia has an embassy in Hanoi and a consulate in Ho Chi Minh City. Vietnam has an embassy in Canberra.; Vietnamese Ministry of Foreign Affairs: VIETNAM – AUSTRALIA RELATIONS
New Zealand	19 June 1975	See New Zealand–Vietnam relations

== See also ==
- List of diplomatic missions in Vietnam
- Visa requirements for Vietnamese citizens
