= Belarus–Vietnam relations =

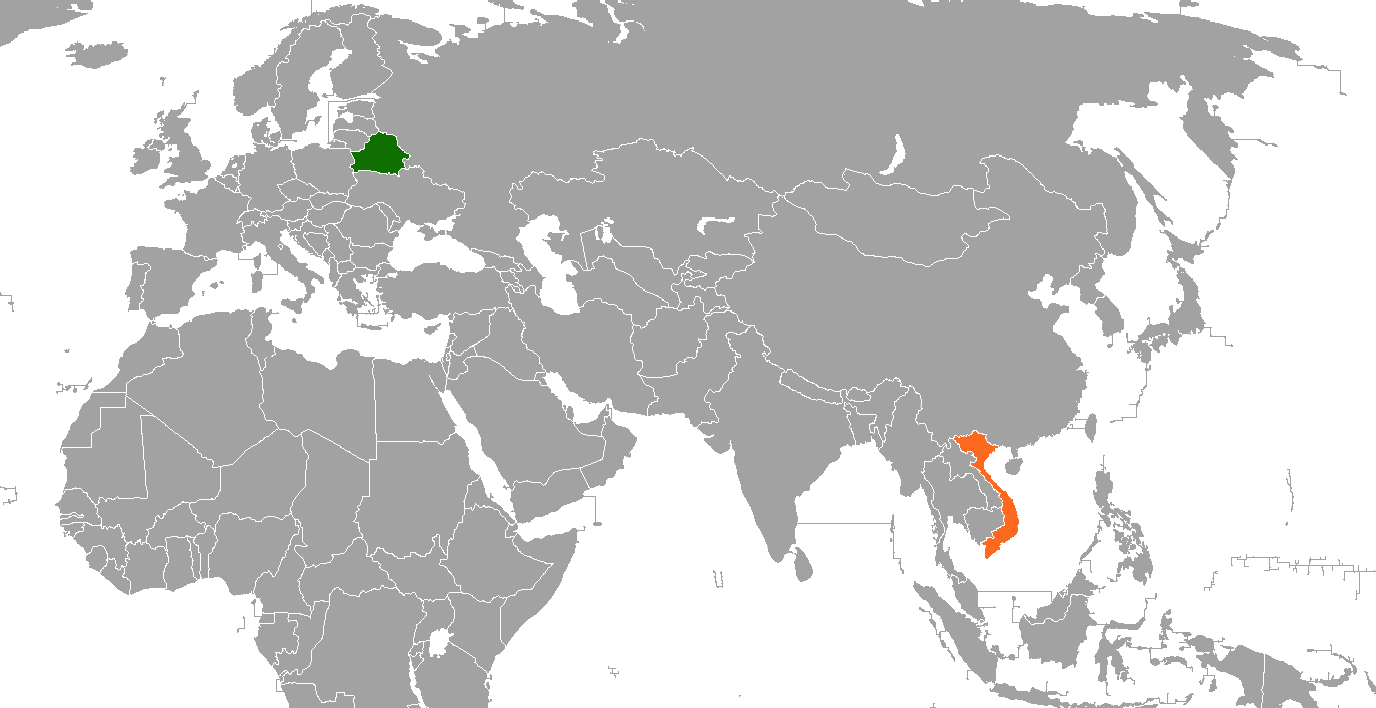

- Belarus: Vietnam

The Byelorussian Soviet Socialist Republic recognized the Democratic Republic of Vietnam on January 30, 1950. Both the modern states of Belarus and reunified Vietnam established official relations in 1991, with the collapse of the Soviet Union. Belarus has an official embassy in Hanoi and Vietnam has its counterpart in Minsk.

== History ==
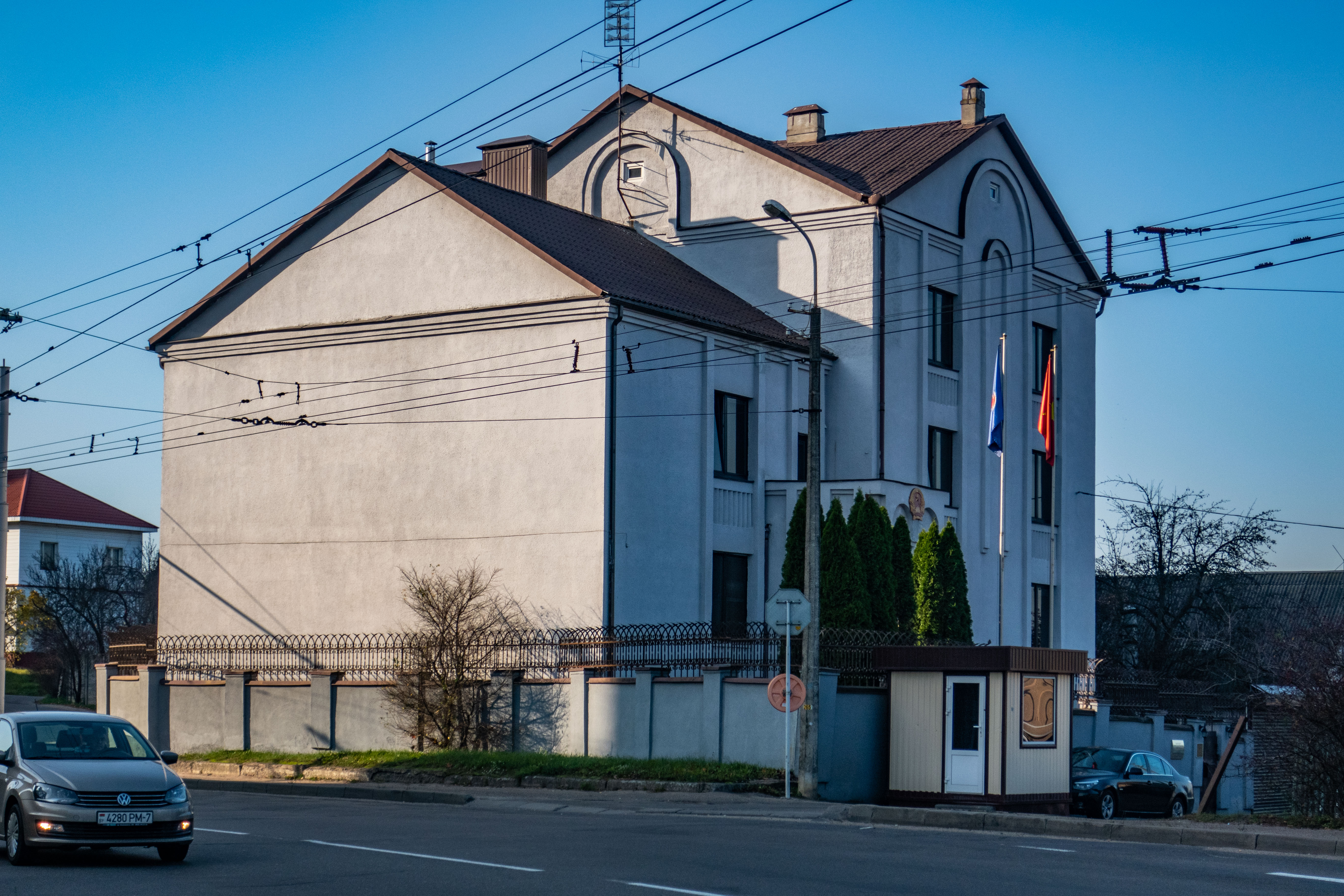
Embassy of Vietnam in Minsk

As a union republic of the Soviet Union, the Byelorussian Soviet Socialist Republic, like the Soviet Union itself, recognized the Democratic Republic of Vietnam on January 30, 1950 as a state. A number of Belarusians, mostly advisers and pilots, were sent to North Vietnam to assist its communist ally in the Vietnam War as part of the USSR.

Since 1991, Belarus and Vietnam enjoy a relative close relations, though not as much as Vietnam's relations with two other East Slavic nations, Russia and Ukraine. Belarus has played a small role on developing the closeness with Vietnam, as Vietnam is quite reliant on assistance from military hardware from former Soviet Union, including Belarus. Over Vietnam's tensions with China (another partner of Belarus), Belarus seeks a neutral position.

Alexander Lukashenko had taken visits to Vietnam in a number of foreign trip; and had confirmed his support to Vietnam in a number of issues.

There is a small Vietnamese community in Belarus.

In November 2024, Vasil Verameychik, a former fighter of the Kastuś Kalinoŭski Regiment and a member of the Coordination Council, was detained in Vietnam and extradited to Belarus.

== Resident diplomatic missions ==
- Belarus has an embassy in Hanoi and a consulate-general in Ho Chi Minh City.
- Vietnam has an embassy in Minsk.

== See also ==
- Foreign relations of Belarus
- Foreign relations of Vietnam
