= Spain–Vietnam relations =

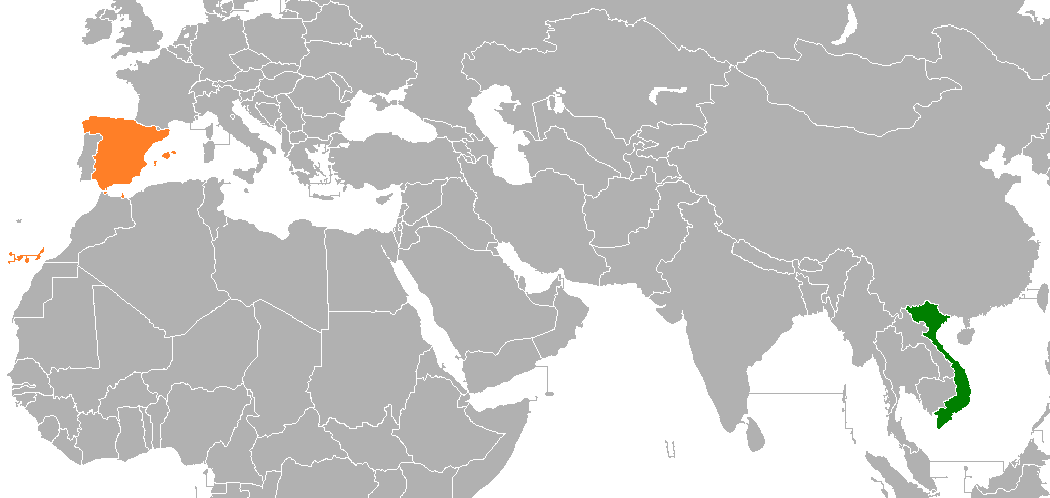
- Vietnam: Spain

Spain–Vietnam relations are the official relations between Spain and Vietnam. Spain has an embassy in Hanoi and Vietnam has an embassy in Madrid.

== History ==
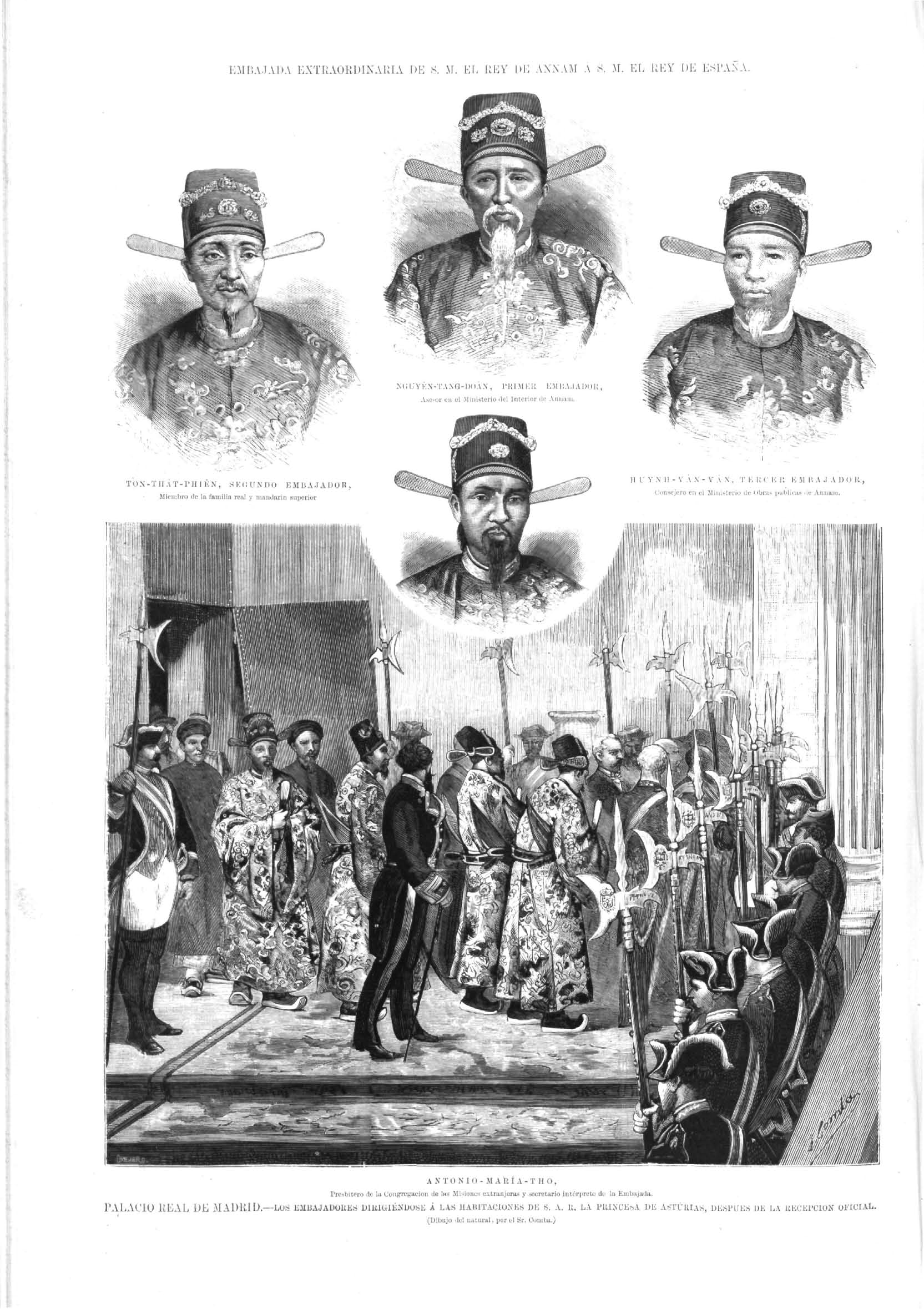
Vietnamese delegation to Spain, November 10th to 21st, 1863.

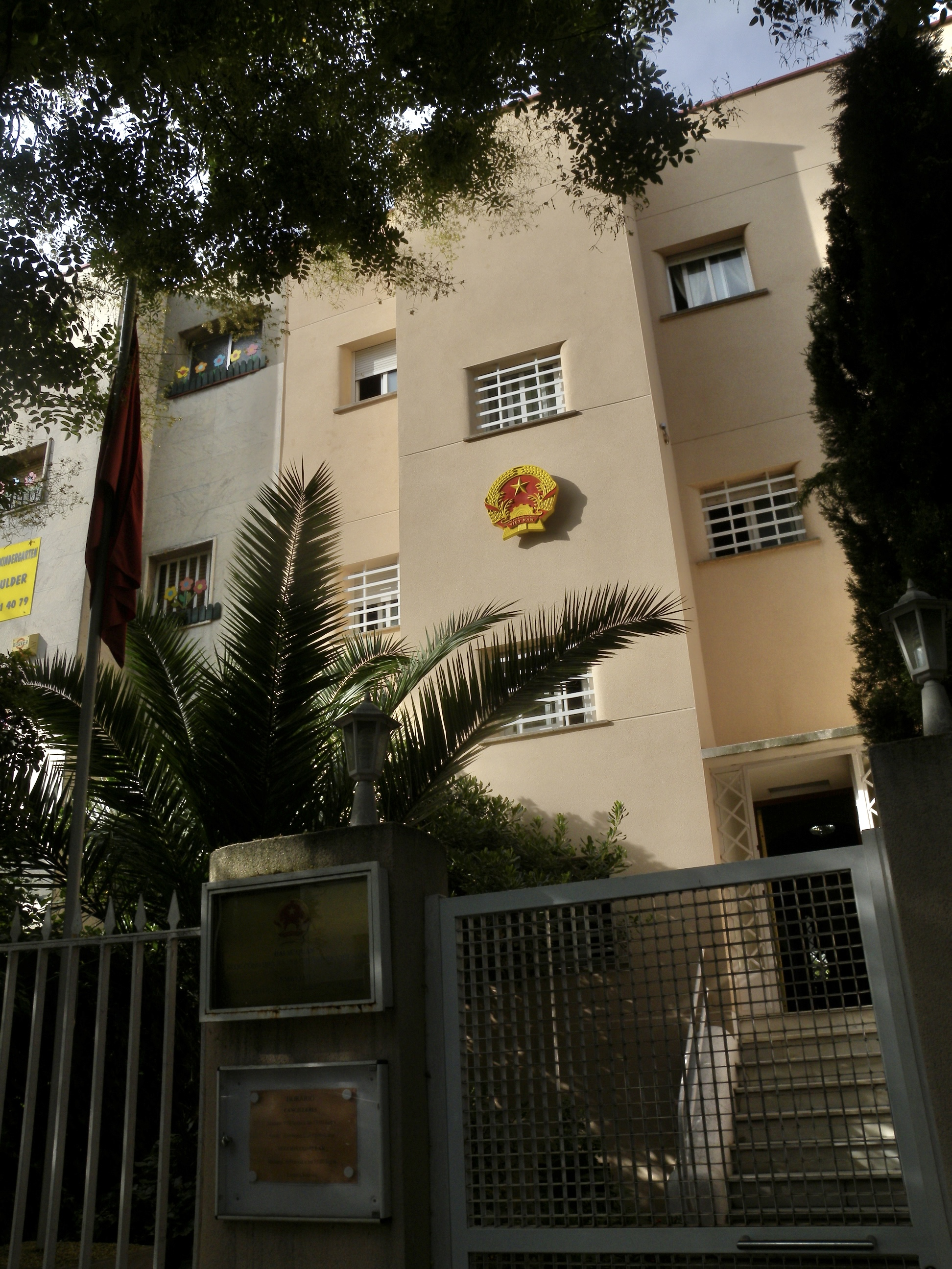
Embassy of Vietnam in Madrid

While two countries had its first contacts at Spanish Formosa and 16th century with the spread of Catholic Jesuits from Spain to Vietnam, their first formal connection between two was only established at 19th century when Isabella II of Spain joined with Napoleon III of France together intervened against Vietnam following anti-Catholic persecutions in the country in 1858. This was the first sign of modern Spanish–Vietnamese relationship, although Spain didn't participate in further mission after Cochinchina Campaign. In the Spanish Civil War, it was reported that three Vietnamese volunteers of the International Brigades who went to Spain from France to fight for the Spanish Republic. Of them, two brothers from Hanoi, named Tchen, were of Chinese descent. They both served in the 13th Brigade; one was a company captain, the other served in the commissariat. The other from Cochinchina, named Van Vong Diep. He was a member of the French Communist Party, came to Spain and served as a cook in the brigade. In Indochina, after the surrender of the Japanese, the French recolonization began the First Indochina War. During the war, many soldiers of the French Foreign Legion fled to the Viet Minh army during the 1945-1954 period, among them were Spanish soldiers and non-commissioned officers. The Spaniards served in the Viet Minh as officers. Many were wounded in fight against the French, some died in the jungle battlefield.

Spain played a small role on the Vietnam War when Francisco Franco, Spain's anti-communist dictator, agreed to aid the United States and South Vietnam by deploying a secret medical unit throughout the conflict, which performed operations on both combatants and civilians. The authorities in Go Cong dedicated them a bridge as a result of their humanitarian aid. In a letter to US President Johnson, Franco said of Ho Chi Minh that "we must give him credit for being a patriot who cannot be indifferent to the annihilation of his country", adding that "he could, without doubt, be the man of the hour needed by Vietnam."

After the war and Franco's death, relationship between Spain and Vietnam was established, but severed after the Cambodian–Vietnamese War over Spain's support to anti-Vietnam sanctions and Spain's withdrawal of ambassador from Vietnam. The relationship between two remained cold until 1990s when Vietnam normalized relations with a number of nations including Spain as for the effect of Đổi mới and the fall of Soviet Union.

== Modern relations ==
Since the end of Cold War, two countries have developed a relatively close relationship, including economic and political cooperation. Spain is also one of the largest economic donors to Vietnam in the European Union.

The expansion of Spanish language and cultures also reached into Vietnam, such as songs in Spanish language and La Liga, which often attracted large Vietnamese supporters alike.

== Resident diplomatic missions ==
- Spain has an embassy in Hanoi.
- Vietnam has an embassy in Madrid.

== See also ==
- Foreign relations of Spain
- Foreign relations of Vietnam
- Cochinchina Campaign
