= Qatar–Vietnam relations =

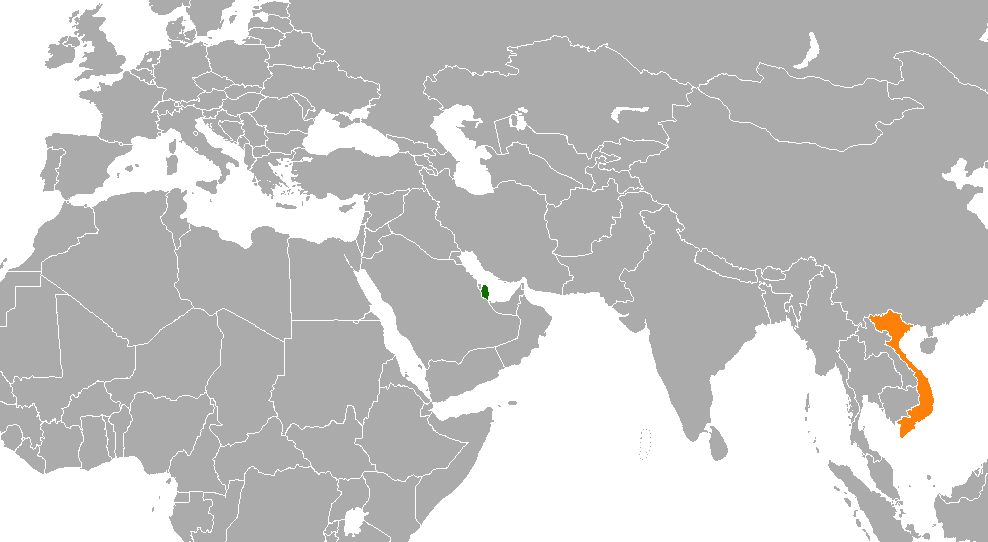

- Qatar: Vietnam

Qatar–Vietnam relations refers to the bilateral relations between the State of Qatar and the Socialist Republic of Vietnam. Qatar has an embassy in Hanoi while Vietnam has an embassy in Doha.

Qatar has a friendly relationship with Vietnam among the Arab world, which is the result of Qatar's strong tie with several ASEAN countries, including Vietnam. Following the successful economic reform at 1986, Vietnam has become a new major destination for Qatari investors. Unlike the investments from the United Arab Emirates, the largest Gulf Arab investor to Vietnam, Qatari investments in Vietnam focus on agriculture, energy, exports and trade between the two countries, which has been later described as great, according to the Qatari envoy to Vietnam.

Qatar has over 10.000 Vietnamese expats living in the country.

== See also ==
- Foreign relations of Qatar
- Foreign relations of Vietnam
