= Turkey–Vietnam relations =

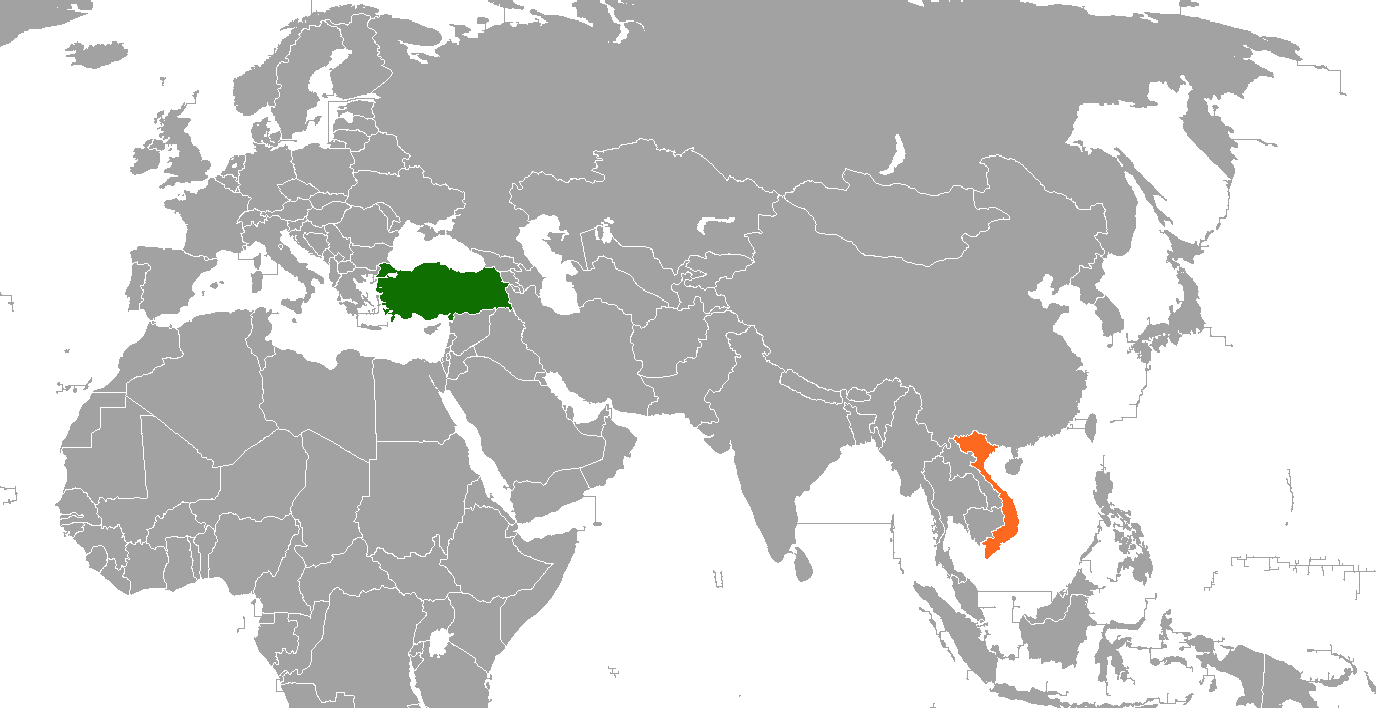
- Turkey: Vietnam

Diplomatic mission
- Embassy of Turkey, Hanoi: Embassy of Vietnam, Ankara

Turkey–Vietnam relations refers to bilateral relations between Turkey and Vietnam. Turkey has an embassy in Hanoi and Vietnam has an embassy in Ankara, and a trade office in Istanbul.

== Historical relations ==
While relations between Turkey and Vietnam is less known comparing to other countries in the Sinosphere world, the Mongol Army invading Vietnam at 13th century was thought to be formed by majority of Turkic and Persian warriors fighting in the war. Many of them were entirely annihilated in all three failed invasions to Vietnam, which marked the first connection between the Vietnamese and Turks. After the failed invasions, the Turks would eventually immigrate to Anatolia and found the Ottoman Empire, and two countries would have no official link until the 20th century.

=== Vietnam War ===
Vietnam went to headline in Turkey at 1960s as for the result of Vietnam War, which Turkey was requested to offer troops fighting in the war to assist its South Vietnamese and American allies against communist expansions, as Turkey is a NATO member. However, Turkey later rejected the offer and consolidated a more diplomatic approach. Turkey and Vietnam's relations would remain irrelevant until the end of the Cold War.

== Modern relations ==
While Vietnam and Turkey established relations at 1978, it was not until 1990s that Vietnam became a growing economic and political partner of Turkey in the ASEAN. Both two countries are highly-rising profile economies, being parts of Next Eleven and CIVETS, thus earn reputation and receive larger trade and investment.

For Vietnam, Turkey is seen as the gate to enter Middle Eastern market, which further bolstered economic cooperation between two countries. In 2017, Binali Yıldırım paid an official visit to Vietnam to increase economic and political cooperation between two countries.

There is a small Cham population in Turkey, mostly descended from Cham refugees fleeing from the Vietnam War.

== Resident diplomatic missions ==
- Turkey has an embassy in Hanoi.
- Vietnam has an embassy in Ankara.

== See also ==
- Foreign relations of Turkey
- Foreign relations of Vietnam
