= Peru–Vietnam relations =

Peru-Vietnam relations
- Peru: Vietnam

Peruvian–Vietnamese relations refers to relations between the Republic of Peru and the Socialist Republic of Vietnam. Both nations are members of the World Trade Organization, Asia-Pacific Economic Cooperation and the United Nations.

== Relationship history ==
While Peru and Vietnam have a great distance and its relations only started very late, in the heat of the Cold War, the Peruvian left-wing military dictatorship led by Juan Velasco shared close ideology with North Vietnam and the Soviet Union, thus drawing his sympathy to North Vietnam (although Peru officially recognized South Vietnam). He intended to engage in a war against Augusto Pinochet's Chile (a right-wing military dictatorship) by using the Vietnam War as an example, though that never materialized. It took more than 20 years, until the end of the Cold War, for the two nations to re-establish relations in 1994.

== Modern relations ==
Modern relations between Peru and Vietnam began after Đổi mới economic reforms in Vietnam, which allowed Vietnam to become a market capitalist economy, and since then the two countries have enjoyed relatively healthy relations, with strong economic and political cooperation between two countries, making Peru an important market for Vietnamese goods in Latin America.

Viettel, a military-backed telecommunication company in Vietnam, established its Bitel brand in Peru and was regarded as an key player in the development of telecommunication infrastructures in Peru, with a fast and growing market demand, surpassing its Chilean rival Entel. Bitel was one of the main sponsors for the Peru national football team throughout its 2018 FIFA World Cup campaign.

== Diplomatic missions ==
- Peru has an embassy in Hanoi.
- Vietnam is accredited to Peru from its embassy in Brasília, Brazil.

== See also ==
- Foreign relations of Peru
- Foreign relations of Vietnam
- List of ambassadors of Peru to Vietnam
