= Tanzania–Vietnam relations =

Tanzania – Vietnam relations
- Tanzania: Vietnam

Tanzania–Vietnam relations are bilateral relations between Tanzania and Vietnam. Vietnam and Tanzania set up diplomatic relations in 1965. Vietnam maintains an embassy in Dar es Salaam which is mandated to serve all of East Africa. Tanzania does not have an embassy in Vietnam, and the embassy in Beijing is accredited to Vietnam.

== Economic relations ==
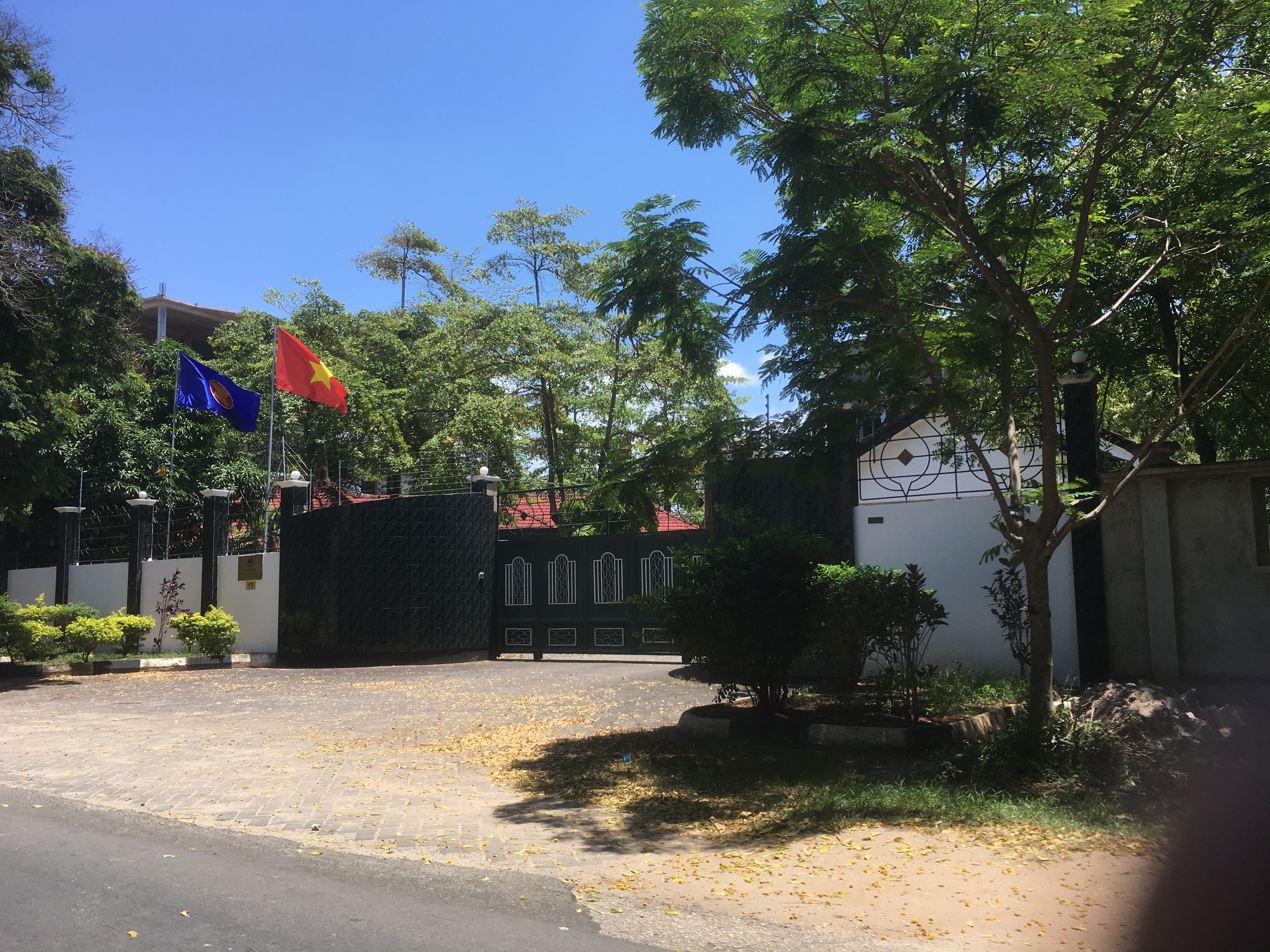
Embassy of Vietnam in Dar es Salaam

The trade volume between the two countries in 2014 was around $156 million, with Vietnam exporting over $105 million worth of goods to Tanzania. The main exports from Vietnam to Tanzania include cement clinker and rice. Tanzania is the second largest buyer of Vietnamese rice after Philippines.

In 2015, the trade volume between the two countries rose to $205 million with the rise in exports from Tanzania. Vietnam is the second largest buyer of Tanzanian cashew nuts and third largest buyer of its raw cotton.

=== Foreign direct investment ===
Halotel is currently the only Vietnamese firm operating in Tanzania with a $700 million initial investment. The state-owned firm promised to provide telecom services in rural areas and was granted an operating licence when president Kikwete made a state visit to Vietnam in 2014.

Various Vietnamese businessmen accompanied president Trương Tấn Sang during his March 2016 visit to Tanzania, to examine the investment atmosphere in Tanzania. The investors examined the special export processing zones in Tanzania and expressed the hope to make Tanzania a gateway for Vietnamese products into East Africa.

== State Visits ==
- 12 October 2014 - President Jakaya Kikwete makes a two-day state visit to Hanoi. The president visits various industries and encourages Vietnamese investment in Tanzania. The president also grants a licence to Viettel Mobile to operate in Tanzania.
- 9 March 2016 - President Truong Tan Sang makes a three-day state visit to Tanzania and held bilateral talks with president John Magufuli. Various trade and investment agreements were signed.

== Resident diplomatic missions ==
- Tanzania is accredited to Vietnam from its embassy in Beijing, China.
- Vietnam has an embassy in Dar es Salaam.

== See also ==
- Foreign relations of Tanzania
- Foreign relations of Vietnam
