= Denmark–Vietnam relations =

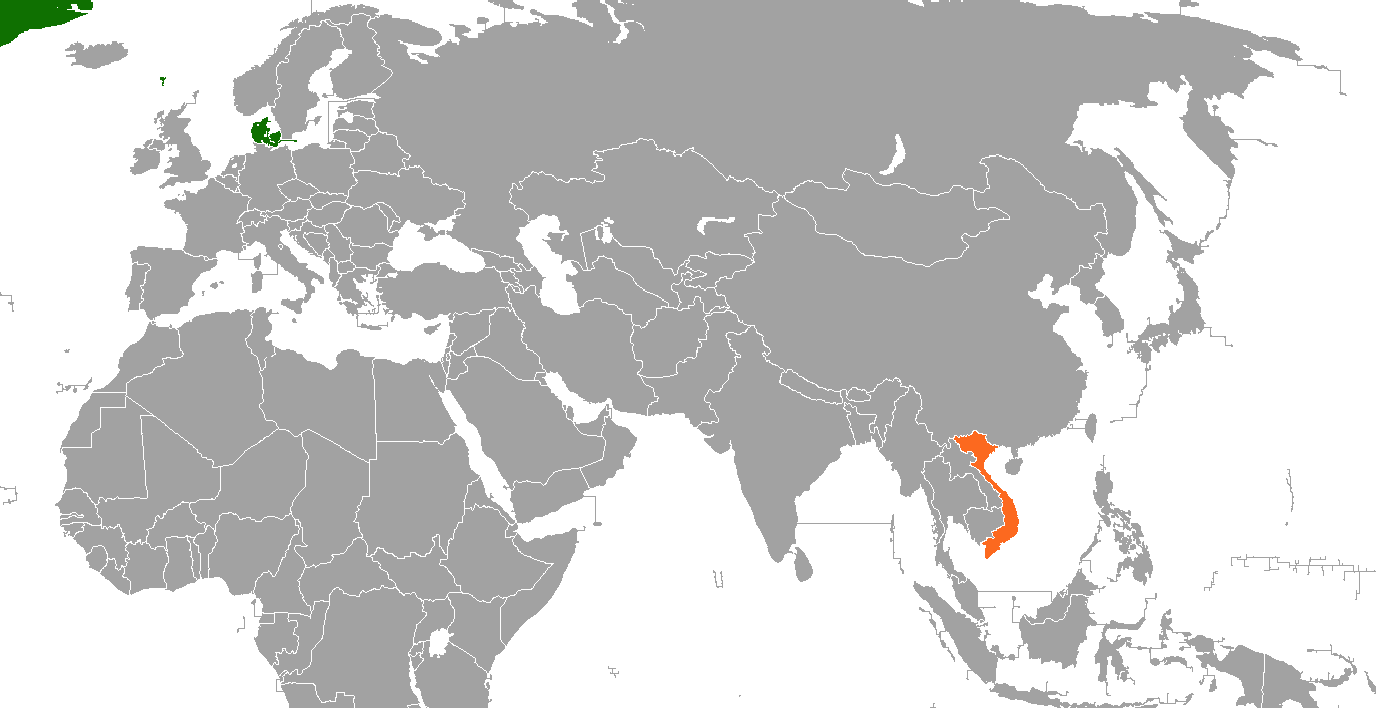
- Denmark: Vietnam

Denmark–Vietnam relations are foreign relations between Denmark and Vietnam. Both countries established diplomatic relations on November 25, 1971. On April 1, 1994, Denmark established an embassy in Hanoi, and since August 12, 2000, Vietnam has had an embassy in Copenhagen.

== Vietnamese migration ==
Approximately 8,500 Vietnamese live in Denmark.

They were heavily impacted by the Vietnam War.

== Agreements ==
In 2002, the two countries signed an environment protection agreement, and in 2007, a framework agreement on the Danish general credit programme for Vietnam.

== Bilateral visits ==
- September 1999, Vietnamese Prime Minister Phan Văn Khải visited Denmark.
- June 2002, Vietnamese Foreign Minister Nguyen Dy Nien visited Denmark.
- October 2004, Danish Minister of Foreign Affairs Per Stig Møller attended the 5th Asia–Europe Meeting in Hanoi.
- March 2007, Danish Minister of Foreign Affairs Ulrik Federspiel visited Vietnam.
- November 2009, Queen Margrethe II of Denmark visited Vietnam.
- March 2013, Danish Minister of Foreign Affairs Villy Søvndal visited Vietnam.

== See also ==
- Foreign relations of Denmark
- Foreign relations of Vietnam
