= Iraq–Vietnam relations =

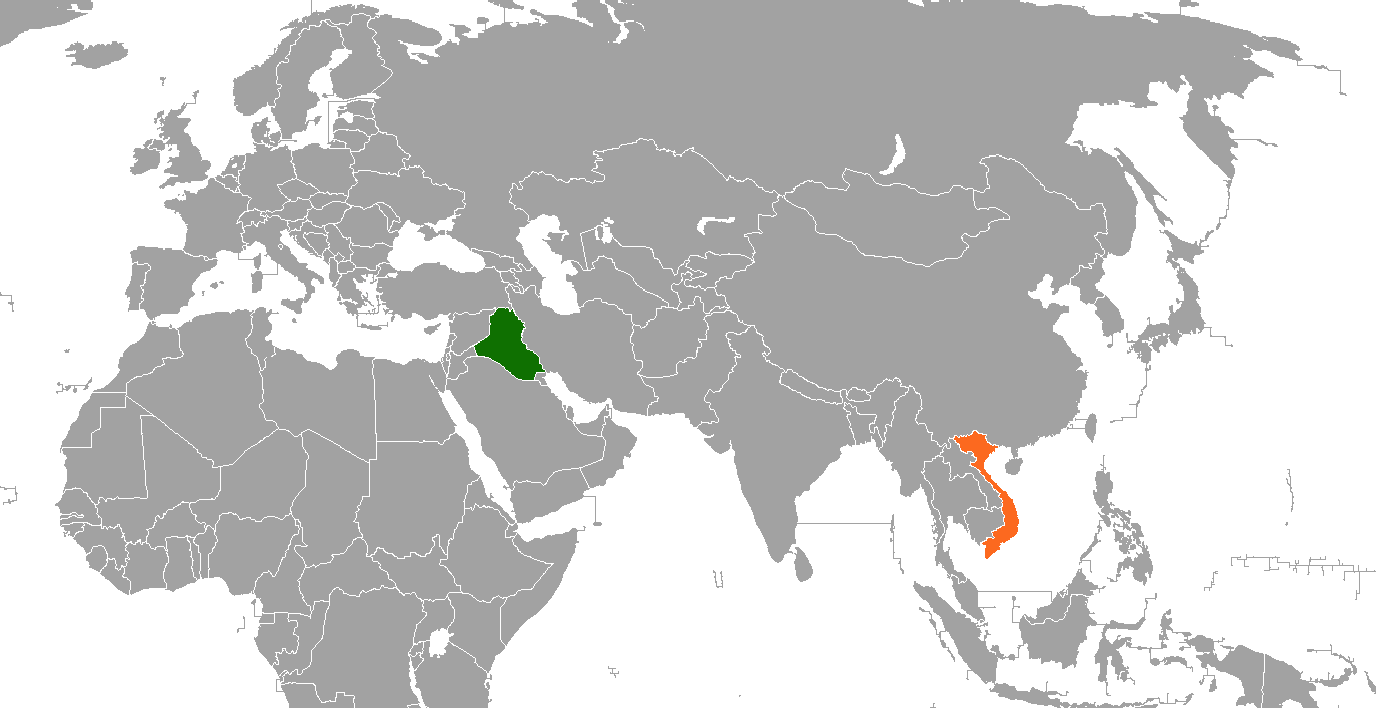
- Iraq: Vietnam

Iraq–Vietnam relations refers to the bilateral relations between Iraq and Vietnam. Iraq has an embassy in Hanoi, while Vietnam has an embassy in Baghdad. Both countries are full members of the United Nations.

== History ==
=== Under Saddam Hussein ===
Under the reign of Saddam Hussein, Iraq's relations with North Vietnam and later unified communist Vietnam was strong, with Iraq providing assistance and loans to Vietnam (Millions of tons of Oil to both North and South Vietnam). Saddam Hussein had a long fondness of Vietnam and admired the determination of the Vietnamese people. In 1971, the Vietnamese delegation received a warm welcome by the Iraqi government.

Saddam Hussein did not demand any payment from Vietnam over Iraq's assistance, and even erased all debts owed by Vietnam when Vietnamese Vice President Nguyễn Thị Bình visited Iraq in 2002. Although Saddam Hussein would be overthrown in 2003 following the American invasion of Iraq, this is still honored by later Iraqi leaders.

== Post-Saddam Hussein ==
Following the 2003 war, the Vietnamese embassy staff were evacuated from Iraq to Jordan. According from the memoir of Nguyễn Quang Khai, former Vietnamese ambassador to Iraq and a fluent speaker of Arabic language, the Vietnamese embassy was one of the few foreign embassies to remain untouched because of protection by locals, although suffering some damages. The new Iraqi leadership were also found to have treated the Vietnamese delegation more leniently compared to other foreign staffs in Iraq, despite having lost three men out of 13 personnel on its perilous journey from Jordan to Iraq. The Vietnamese government criticized the decision to wage war on Iraq led by the United States.

In 2018, Vietnam and Iraq celebrated 50 years of relationship. Vietnam, in recent years, provided significant aid to Iraq on its post-war reconstruction as a debt of the past support from Iraq.

== Resident diplomatic missions ==
- Iraq has an embassy in Hanoi.
- Vietnam is accredited to Iraq through its embassy in Tehran.

== See also ==
- Foreign relations of Iraq
- Foreign relations of Vietnam
