= Italy–Vietnam relations =

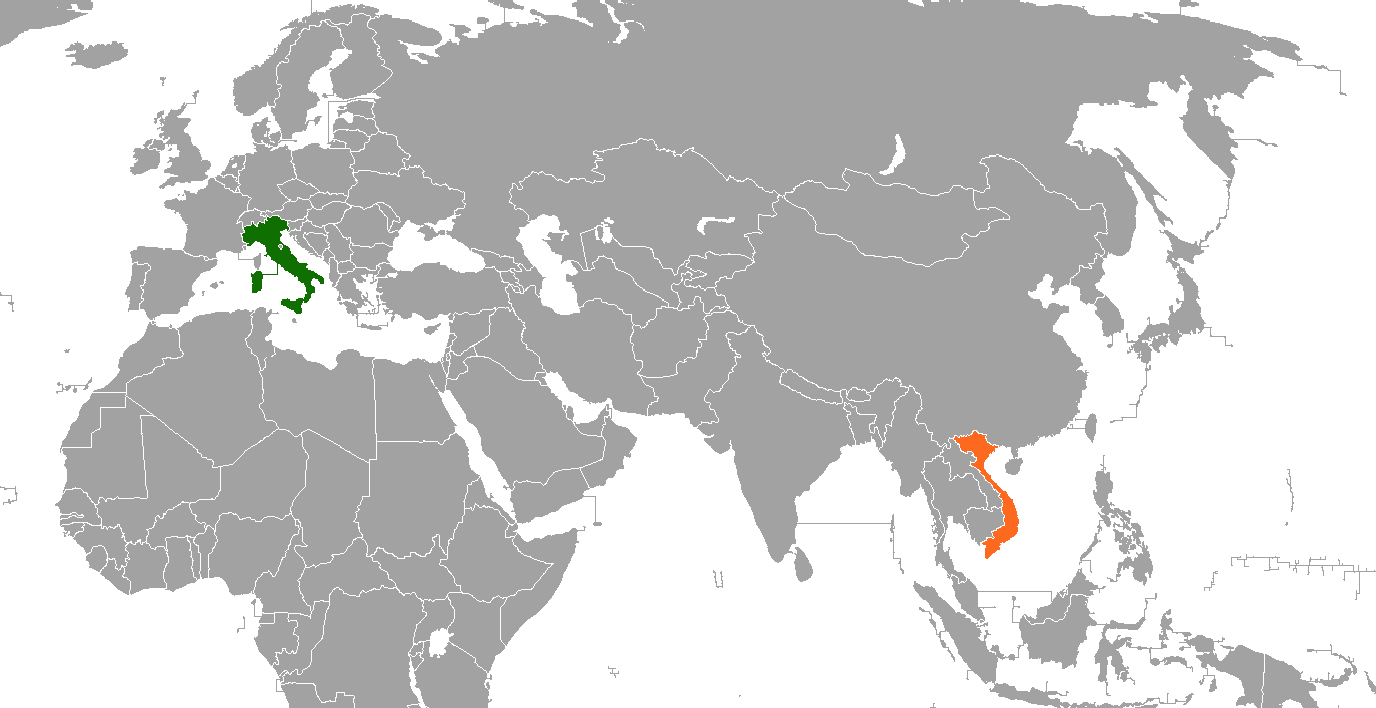
- Italy: Vietnam

Bilateral relations between Italy and Vietnam are considered to be relatively strong and friendly. Italy maintains an embassy in Hanoi. Vietnam maintains an embassy in Rome.

== History ==
During the Vietnam War, Italy only recognized South Vietnam as it is aligned to the West. Nonetheless, in 1966, Italian ambassador to Saigon, Giovanni D'Orlandi, collaborated with Polish diplomat Janusz Lewandowski from communist Poland which maintained friendly tie with North Vietnam to persuade for a total peace and end the Vietnam War. The Operation Marigold was deemed to be one of the best opportunities to end the war, however, due to increasing tensions between the United States and North Vietnam, which led to a subsequent decision to bomb North Vietnam by President Lyndon Johnson, it failed to materialize.

Italy and North Vietnam finally established relations in 1973.

== Modern relations ==
Ever since the end of Cold War, Italo–Vietnamese relations has witnessed a resurgence. Over this period, the two countries have developed close ties and cooperation. Italy has actively supported greater cooperation between Vietnam and the European Union (EU) and the normalisation of relations between Vietnam and international financial, commercial and monetary institutions. Two-way trade between Vietnam and Italy reached US$4.3 billion in 2015. The two countries are striving for US$5 billion per year.

In 2005, Vietnam had wished to develop multi-faceted relations with Italy in conformity with the current situations in the world and the region, President Trần Đức Lương assured visiting President Pier Ferdinando Casini of the Italian Chamber of Upper House during his visit to Hanoi.

Sandra Scagliotti, Director of the Centre for Vietnam Studies in Turin in Italy, stated "Vietnam and Italy are enjoying the most vibrant period in their relations, across politics, economy, culture exchange, and security cooperation."

== Resident diplomatic missions ==
- Italy has an embassy in Hanoi.
- Vietnam has an embassy in Rome.

== See also ==
- Foreign relations of Italy
- Foreign relations of Vietnam
