= Bangladesh–Vietnam relations =

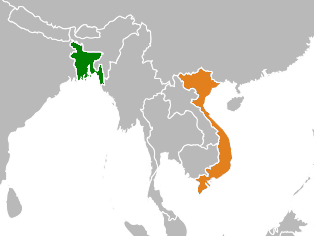

- Bangladesh: Vietnam

Bangladesh–Vietnam relations refer to the bilateral relations between Bangladesh and Vietnam.

== History ==
Bangladesh supported the Vietnamese people and Bangladesh had established ties on 11 February 1973 with Vietnam and protests were held in support of Vietnam. Bangladesh was the second Asian country and the first in South Asia to recognise and establish diplomatic relations at ambassadorial level with the Provisional Revolutionary Government of the Republic of South Vietnam (July 1973). Prime Minister Khaleda Zia was the first Bangladeshi head of government to visit Vietnam in May 2004. In 2013 the two nations celebrated the 40th anniversary of the establishment of diplomatic ties. Bangladesh and Vietnam have embassies in each other's countries. Prime Minister Sheikh Hasina visited Vietnam in 2012 to promote ties. The President of Bangladesh, Mohammad Abdul Hamid, went on a state visit of Vietnam in August 2015. He was received by Vietnamese President Truong Tan Sang.

== Economic relations ==
Bangladesh is a major importer of cement from Vietnam. In 2016 Bangladesh imported cement worth 141 million dollar from Vietnam. Vinamilk of Vietnam partnered with Bigbiz in Bangladesh, to sell its products in Bangladesh in January 2017. In 2013-2014 period Bangladesh exported 55.95 million dollar worth of goods to Vietnam and imported goods worth 582.24 million dollar. The export earnings of Bangladesh from Vietnam amounted to $53.47 million in FY 2018–19. During the period, Top 10 exporting products covering 54.81 per cent of the exports were fresh, chilled, frozen, salted Guts, Bladders and Stomachs of animals; Leather of animals without hair; Single Yarn of Jute or of other Textile-based Fibers; Sacks and Bags of Jute; Slag, Dross, etc. from the manufacture of Iron or Steel; Sesame Seeds; Medicaments of Mixed or Unmixed Products; Raw Jute and T-shirts, Vest of Cotton- knitted. In FY 2017–18, imports of Bangladesh from Vietnam reached $594.69 million. The Top 10 imported items by Bangladesh from Vietnam were Cement and Cement Clinkers; Rice; Telephone Sets and Cellular Phones; Pebbles, Stones and Gravel; Cotton Yarn other than Sewing Thread; Synthetic Filament Yarn; Leather further prepared after tanning or crusting; Structures and Parts of Structures; Woven Fabrics of Synthetic Filament Yarn; Natural Rubber and similar Natural Gums.

== Resident diplomatic missions ==
- Bangladesh has an embassy in Hanoi.
- Vietnam has an embassy in Dhaka.

== See also ==
- Foreign relations of Bangladesh
- Foreign relations of Vietnam
