= United Arab Emirates–Vietnam relations =

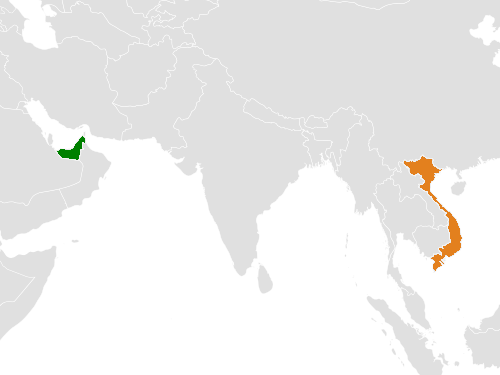

- United Arab Emirates: Vietnam

The United Arab Emirates has an embassy in Hanoi, while Vietnam has an embassy in Abu Dhabi.

== History ==
Although the two countries are for the most part culturally and religiously different, the Chams, an indigenous people in Central and Southern Vietnam share the same religion as Emiratis and had embraced Islam as for the result of the historical trades from the Arab traders as well as Malay traders, who brought Islam into the region.

== Economic relations ==
Since the 1986 economic reform in Vietnam, the UAE has become one of the largest Arab and Islamic economic investors in Vietnam. The UAE is also a donor for several construction of mosques in Vietnam, including Vietnam's largest mosque was opened in January 2006 in Xuân Lộc, Đồng Nai Province; its construction was partially funded by donations from Saudi Arabia and the United Arab Emirates. The UAE also provides Islamic education to the Vietnamese Muslim community, notably the Chams.

The UAE is Vietnam's largest export market in the Middle East, with total bilateral trade reaching over $16 billion. Key Vietnamese exports include electronics, telecommunications equipment, textiles, footwear, and agricultural products like coffee and spices. In return, Vietnam imports petroleum products, plastics, and chemicals from the UAE, with UAE exports to Vietnam growing at an annualized rate of 9% over five years, rising from $725 million in 2018 to $1.12 billion in 2023. This economic relationship was further solidified on October 28, 2024, when the two countries signed the Comprehensive Economic Partnership Agreement (CEPA), Vietnam's first free trade agreement with an Arab nation, which pledged to eliminate tariffs on over 98% of trade lines and expand cooperation in renewable energy, logistics, digital trade, and Halal certification.

== Resident diplomatic missions ==
- United Arab Emirates has an embassy in Hanoi.
- Vietnam has an embassy in Abu Dhabi.

== See also ==
- Foreign relations of the United Arab Emirates
- Foreign relations of Vietnam
