= Saudi Arabia–Vietnam relations =

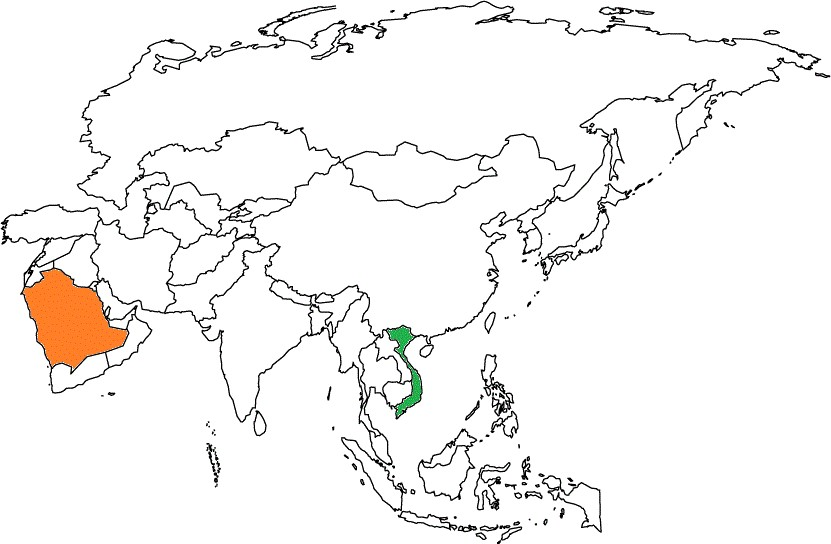
- Vietnam: Saudi Arabia

Diplomatic mission
- Embassy of Vietnam, Riyadh: Embassy of Saudi Arabia, Hanoi

Saudi Arabia–Vietnam relations refer to the bilateral relations between the Kingdom of Saudi Arabia and the Socialist Republic of Vietnam. Vietnam has an embassy in Riyadh and Saudi Arabia has an embassy in Hanoi.

== History ==
While geographically not close, in history, there had been connection between the two when Vietnam was still under Chinese rule. Seafaring Muslim traders are known to have made stops at ports in the Champa Kingdom en route to China very early in the history of Islam. After the Tang Dynasty collapsed, Abbasid Caliphate continued trading with the Vietnamese in Annam, later with Đại Việt kingdom.

On the same time, the Arab traders also dealt with the Chams in Central Vietnam, by then was still ruling independently as Champa, whose awareness of Islam was earlier than its Vietnamese counterparts. The Arab link to Cham population was a major source for the future conversion to Islam by the Cham population by the 15th century, although by that time, Champa was annihilated by the Vietnamese and Islam was strictly controlled by the Vietnamese authorities, who viewed Islam with suspicion. After the Vietnamese conquest of Champa, Arabs were preoccupied with trades toward Siam, Malacca and thus, the relationship between Vietnam and the Arab world could not develop further until the French conquest in 19th century.

=== Early 20th century to 1990s ===
Modern links between Saudi Arabia and Vietnam began in 20th century when the French managed to conquer Vietnam and temporarily put an end to persecution of the minority Cham Muslim population. A Cham student, Mohammad Badri, who traveled to Saudi Arabia, was considered to be the first Salafi cleric in Vietanmese history, where he sought to expand Saudi Islamic teachings across the Cham minority and Vietnamese converts.

In 1974, South Vietnam agreed to establish relations with Saudi Arabia, although it did not last long. Due to the Vietnam War, and subsequently until 1990s, there were no formal relations between Saudi Arabia and unified communist Vietnam as Saudi Arabia aligned with the United States against the communist Soviet Union. Saudi Arabia, alongside North Yemen and several Gulf nations at the time also hosted a small number of Vietnamese refugees of Cham and Arab origin in 1980s due to religious persecution by the communist regime.

=== Since 1990s ===
After Vietnam enacted Đổi mới, relations between Vietnam and Saudi Arabia started to improve. In 1999, Saudi Arabia officially announced the establishment of relations with Vietnam. It was followed by the inaugural of Vietnamese embassy in Riyadh in 2007, and Saudi embassy in Hanoi a year later.

== Economic relations ==
Since the establishment of relations, two countries have experienced growth in trades. Two-way trade turnover has remained stable at a high level, reaching US$1.8 billion in 2018.

== Diaspora ==
There are over 10–20,000 Vietnamese workers in Saudi Arabia, which is considered small compared to Filipino and South Asian communities. In 2014, Saudi Arabia and Vietnam had signed a five-year labor pact to allow more Vietnamese workers entering Saudi Arabia, however their living conditions had been largely criticized for being treated like slaves by the Saudi owners, sparking outcries in Vietnam. In response, the Vietnamese embassy in Saudi Arabia decided to repatriate a small number of Vietnamese workers back home.

== Resident diplomatic missions ==
- Saudi Arabia has an embassy in Riyadh.
- Vietnam has an embassy in Hanoi.

== See also ==
- Foreign relations of Saudi Arabia
- Foreign relations of Vietnam
