= Mexico–Vietnam relations =

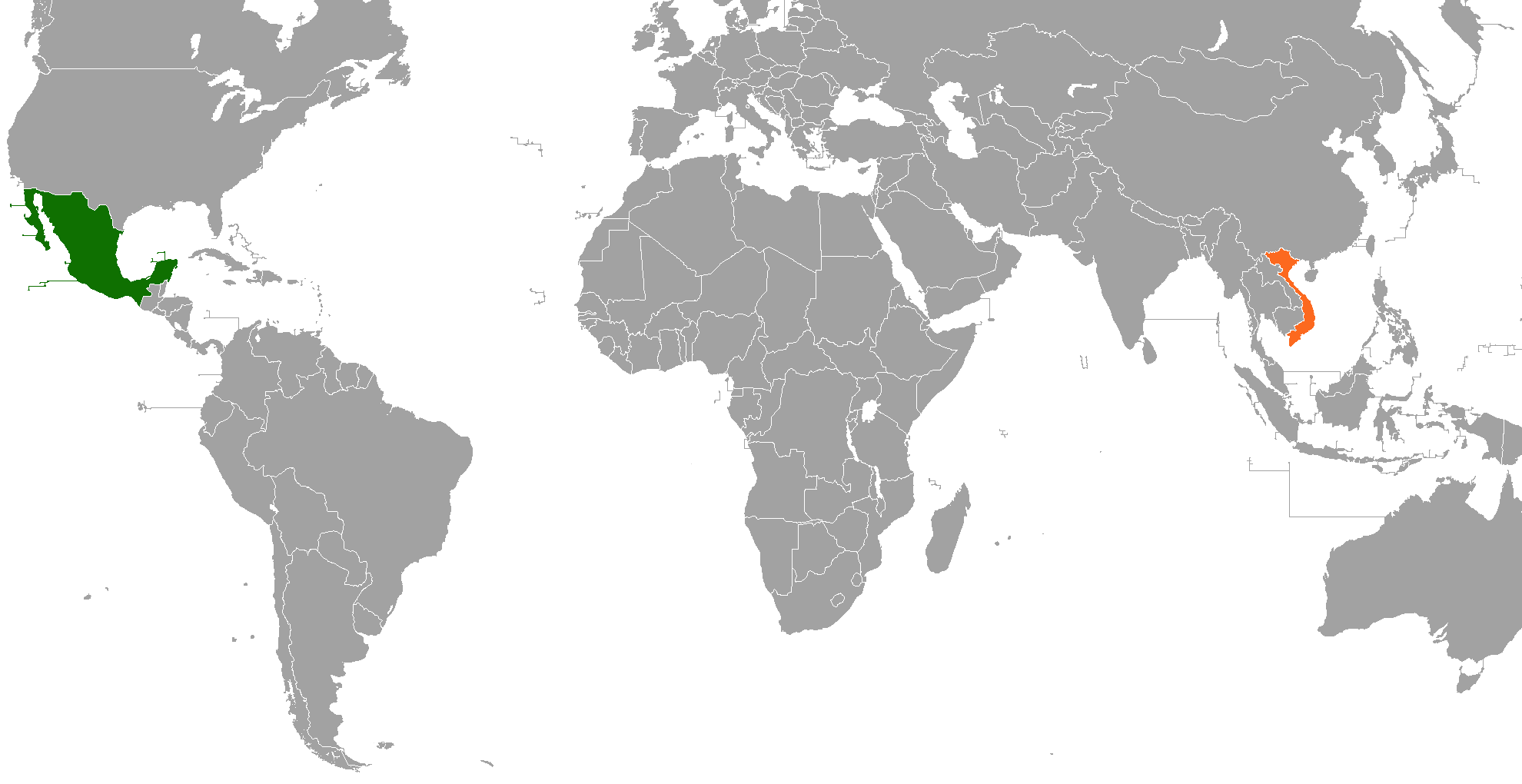

- Mexico: Vietnam

Mexico and Vietnam established diplomatic relations on May 19, 1975. Both nations are members of the Asia-Pacific Economic Cooperation, Forum of East Asia-Latin America Cooperation and the United Nations.

== History ==
Bust of President Ho Chi Minh in Acapulco.

Mexico and Vietnam are two nations that share a common history in the fact that both nations at one time were under the influence of the Second French Empire: the colony of French Indochina (including Vietnam) and the French-backed Second Mexican Empire. In 1945, Vietnam declared independence from France and soon Vietnam entered into the First Indochina War (1946-1954) and then the Vietnam War (1955-1975). During the Vietnam war, Mexico remained neutral.

After the war ended in April 1975, both nations established diplomatic relations with each other on 19 May, 1975. Mexico soon appointed its ambassador to China concurrent ambassador to Vietnam. In 1975 Vietnam opened an embassy in Mexico City and Mexico followed suit by opening an embassy in Hanoi in 1976.

In 1975, Deputy Foreign Minister Nguyễn Cơ Thạch travelled to Mexico and met President Luis Echeverría. That same year, Mexico sent a ship to Vietnam carrying aid and materials worth a million dollars. In 1979, Vietnamese Prime Minister Phạm Văn Đồng paid an official visit to Mexico where he met President José López Portillo.

In 1980, Mexico closed its embassy due to financial reasons, however, Mexico re-opened its embassy in October 2000. In 2002, both countries established a bilateral Mechanism for Political Consultations. In October 2002, Vietnamese Prime Minister Phan Văn Khải travelled to Mexico to attend the APEC Summit in Los Cabos where he met President Vicente Fox.

In 2011, Mexico unveiled a statue of Chairman Ho Chi Minh in Mexico City. In November 2017, Mexican President Enrique Peña Nieto paid a visit to Vietnam to attend the APEC summit in Da Nang and met with President Trần Đại Quang.

In 2020, both nations celebrated 45 years of diplomatic relations. In March 2023, Mexican Foreign Undersecretary, Carmen Moreno Toscano, paid a visit to Vietnam and met with her counterpart to attend a bilateral political consultation between both nations and to discuss the political, economic and cooperation between Mexico and Vietnam.

== High-level visits ==
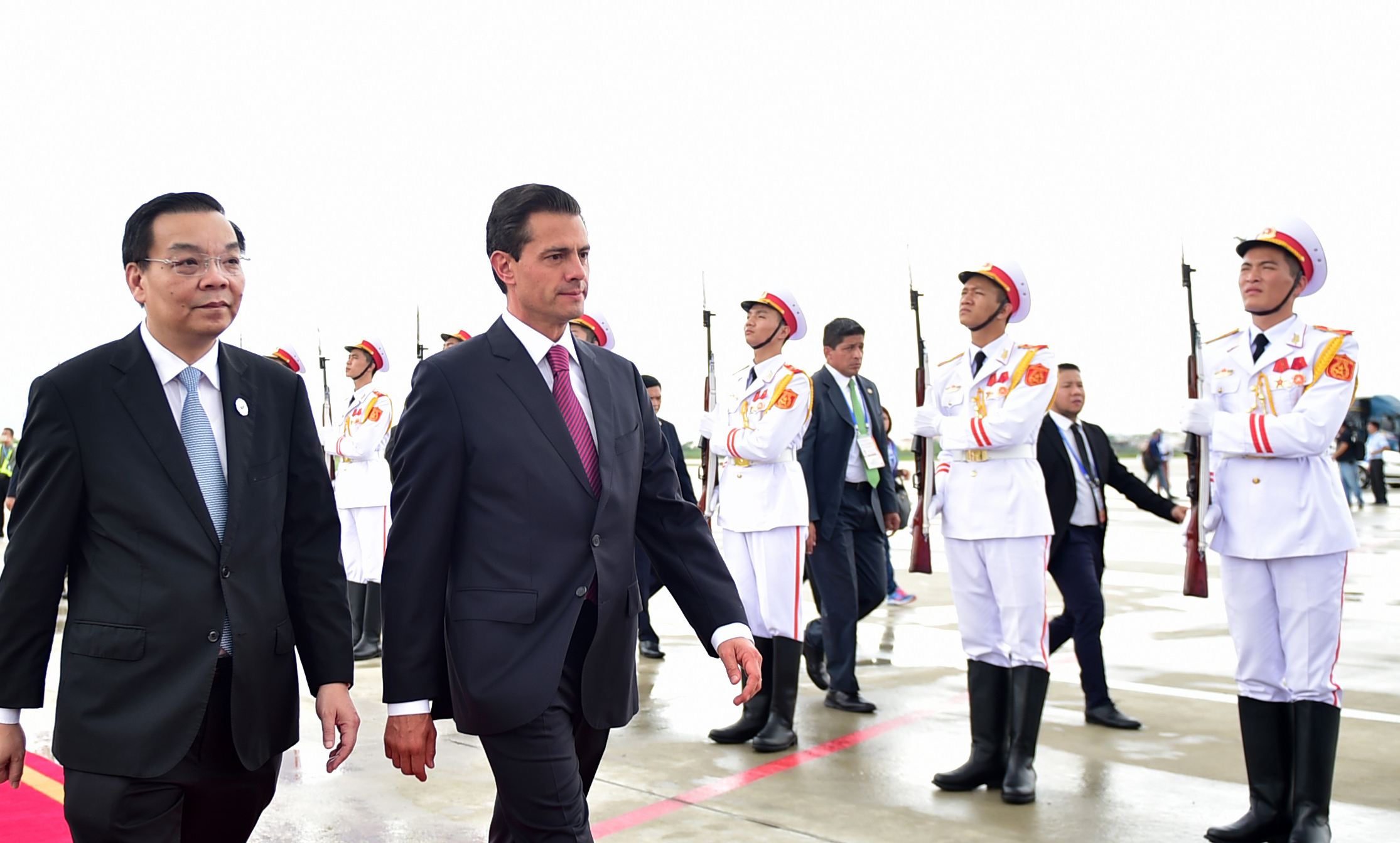
Mexican President Enrique Peña Nieto arriving to Vietnam; November 2017.

High-level visits from Mexico to Vietnam

- Foreign Undersecretary Carlos de Icaza (2016)
- President Enrique Peña Nieto (2017)
- Foreign Undersecretary Carmen Moreno Toscano (2023)

High-level visits from Vietnam to Mexico

- Deputy Foreign Minister Nguyễn Cơ Thạch (1975)
- Prime Minister Phạm Văn Đồng (1979)
- First Deputy Prime Minister Nguyễn Tấn Dũng (2001)
- Prime Minister Phan Văn Khải (2002)
- Foreign Minister Nguyễn Dy Niên (2002)
- Foreign Deputy Minister Le Van Bang (2004)
- Foreign Vice Minister Bùi Thanh Sơn (2019)

== Bilateral agreements ==
Both nations have signed several bilateral agreements such as an Agreement for Educational and Cultural Cooperation (2002); Agreement on the suppression of Visa Requirements for Official and Diplomatic Passport Holders of both nations (2002); Memorandum of Understanding for the Establishment of a Mechanism of Political Consultations (2002); Agreement on Technical and Scientific Cooperation (2011); Agreement in Agriculture and Forestry (2011) and an Agreement on Economic, Trade and Investment Cooperation (2016).

== Trade relations ==
In 2018, both nations became signatories of the Comprehensive and Progressive Agreement for Trans-Pacific Partnership. In 2023, two-way trade between both nations amounted to US$12 billion. Mexico's main exports to Vietnam include: data processing machines, electronics, telephones and mobile phones, refined copper and copper alloy, tanned hides and skins, cars, chemical based products, fish, meat and vegetables. Vietnam's main exports to Mexico include: electronic integrated circuits, telephones and mobile phones, parts and accessories for machines, electrical appliances, parts for motor vehicles, iron and steel based products, clothing and footwear, coffee, fish, fruits and nuts; and imitation jewelry. Mexico is Vietnam's second largest trading partner in Latin America and Vietnam is Mexico's eighth largest trading partner in Asia.

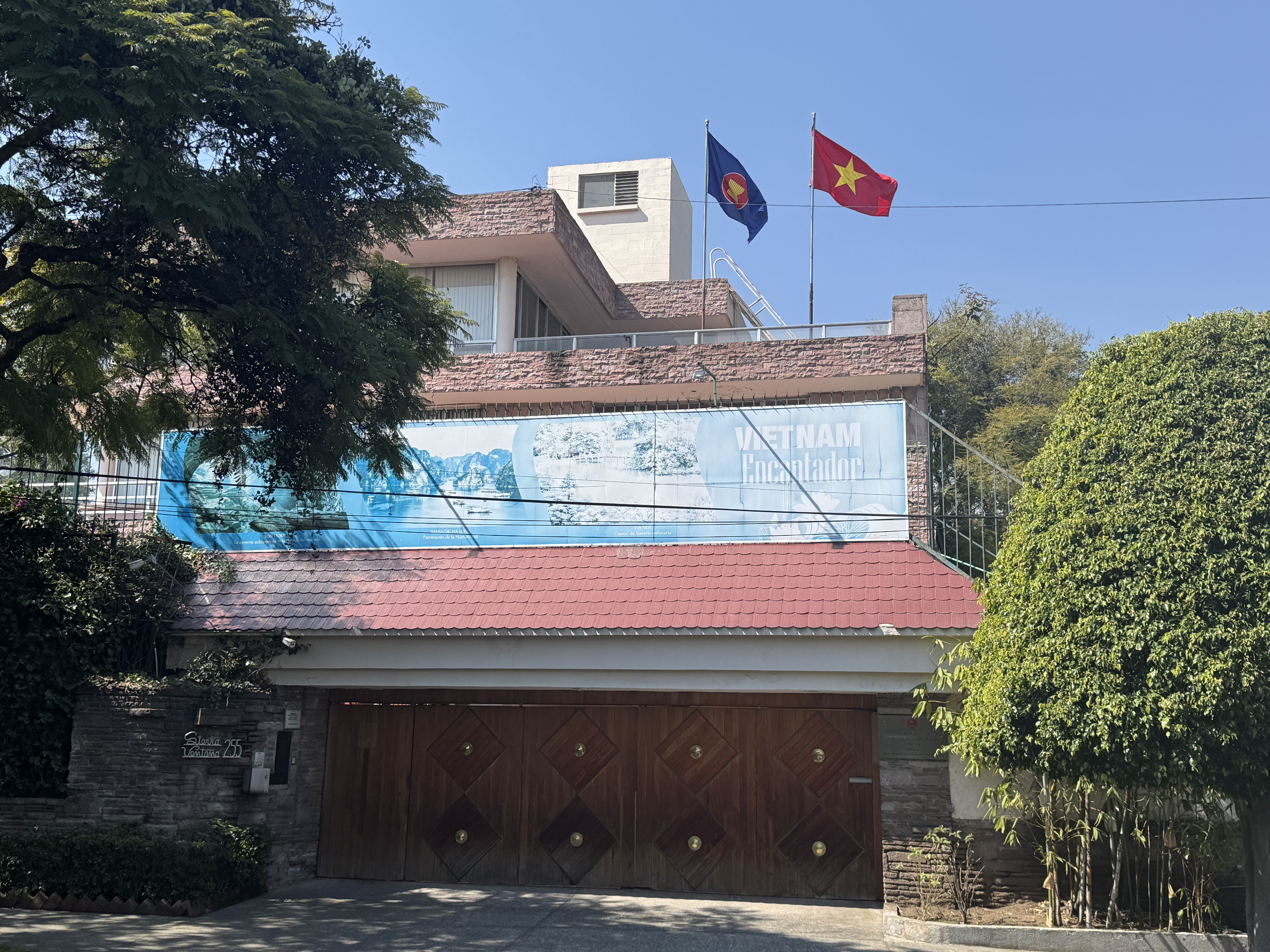
Embassy of Vietnam in Mexico City

== Resident diplomatic missions ==
- Mexico has an embassy in Hanoi.
- Vietnam has an embassy in Mexico City.
