= Kenya–Vietnam relations =

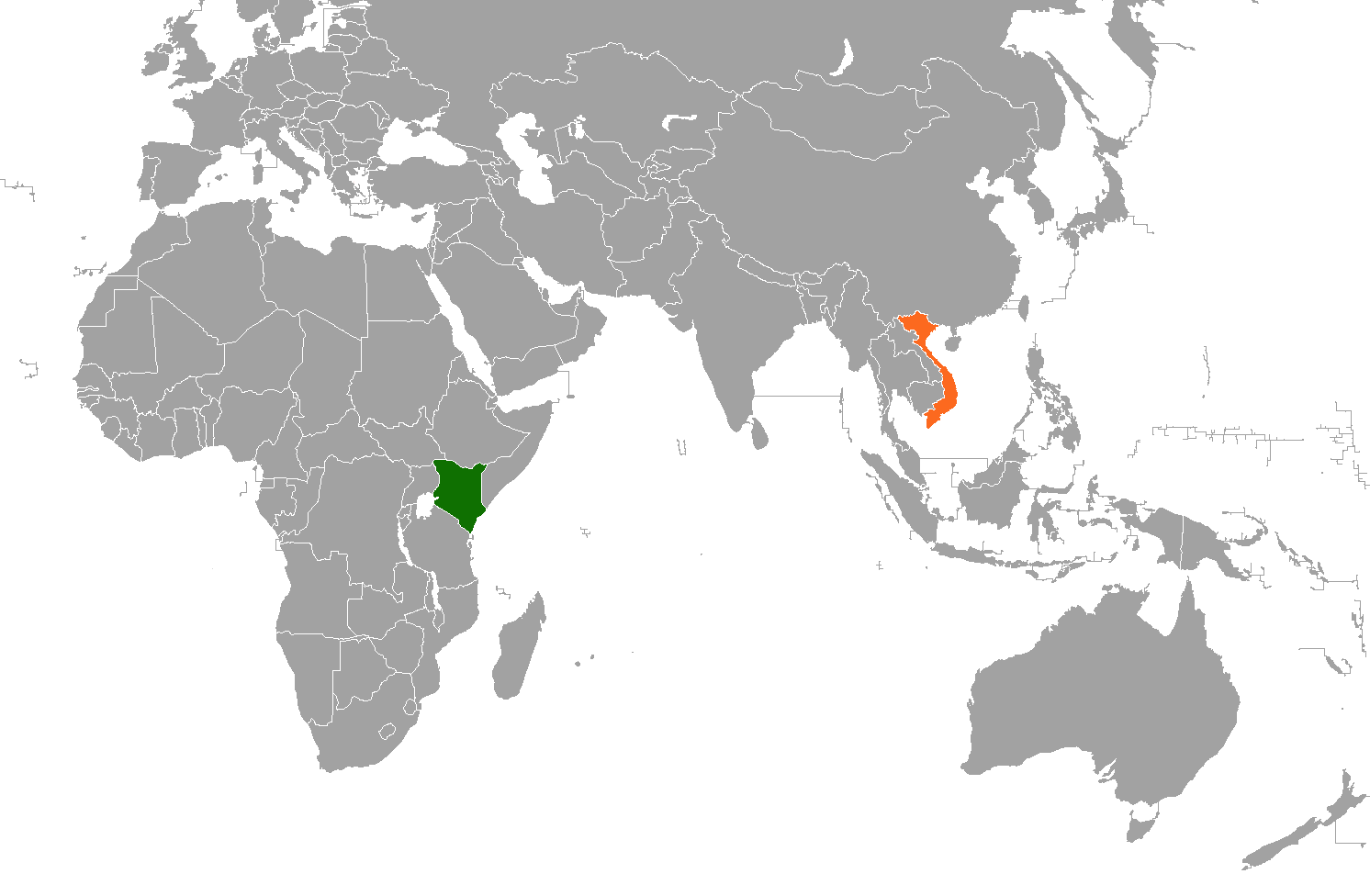
- Kenya: Vietnam

Kenya–Vietnam relations are bilateral relations between Kenya and Vietnam. Neither country has a resident ambassador.

== History ==
Relations between both countries remain cordial.

Both countries seek to expand relations. The Deputy Vietnamese Minister for Trade, Le Duong Quang was quoted saying that Vietnam would work closely with Kenya and pursue deeper trade and diplomatic ties.

Kenya and Vietnam are both members of the Non-aligned movement.

== Vietnamese People in Kenya ==
The history of Vietnamese people in Kenya is marked by small, distinct waves of migration. The earliest documented presence dates back to 1978, when a group of 51 Vietnamese refugees were granted temporary asylum in Kenya after being rescued at sea.

In the early 2000s, a few Vietnamese expatriates began arriving in the country for work with embassies, international NGOs, and the United Nations. The first full Vietnamese family was recorded to have arrived in 2013. Since then, more Vietnamese individuals have moved to Kenya for work, but the overall population remains low.

== Official visits ==
PM Nguyễn Xuân Phúc hosted a reception for Cabinet Secretary (CS) for Foreign Affairs Kenya Monica Juma.

CS for Foreign Affairs Kenya Monica Juma also met with Deputy PM Phạm Bình Minh in Hanoi in late 2019.

Both the Deputy PM and the CS for Foreign Affairs agreed that stronger collaboration in fields such as economy, culture, education and IT was necessary. As well as establishing a political consultation mechanism between foreign ministries.

== Economic relations ==
Vietnam seeks to improve trade ties with Kenya. Trade between both countries doubled between the first quarters of 2010 and 2011.

In 2011, Vietnam exported goods worth KES. 82 million (US$1 million) to Kenya. In 2012, Vietnam's export value to Kenya jumped to KES. 6.56 billion (US$80 million).

The main goods exported from Vietnam to Kenya include: rice, computer, electronic parts and plastic products.

Kenya is considered an access point to East African markets.

=== Transport ===
Kenya Airways will from 30 March 2015 become Africa's first carrier to offer direct flights to Vietnam.

== Diplomatic missions ==
Kenya's embassy in Thailand is accredited to Vietnam. Vietnam's embassy in Tanzania is accredited to Kenya.
