= Ukraine–Vietnam relations =

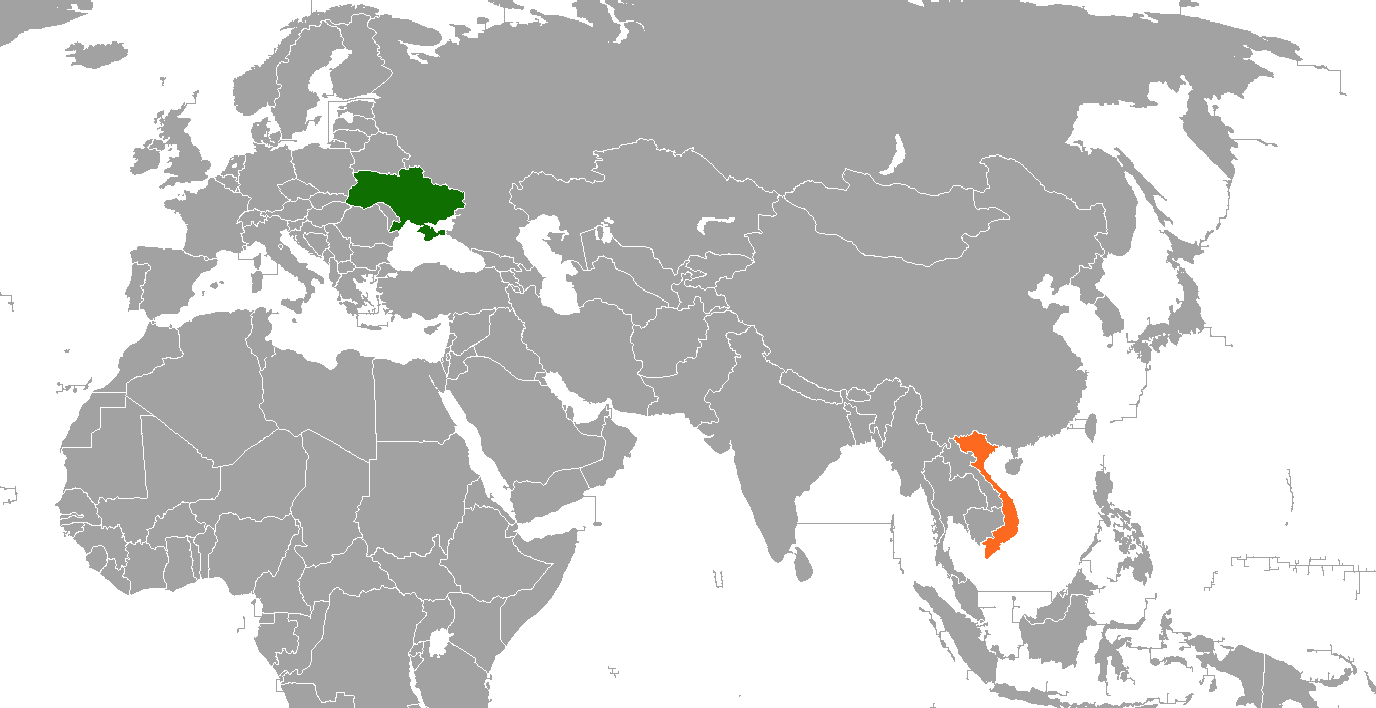
- Ukraine: Vietnam

Ukraine–Vietnam relations are the bilateral relations between Ukraine and Vietnam. Vietnam recognized Ukraine's independence from the Soviet Union on 27 December 1991. Diplomatic relations between the two countries were established on 23 January 1992. The embassy of Vietnam in Ukraine started its operations in 1993, and the embassy of Ukraine in Vietnam was opened in 1997.

== Political and economic relations ==
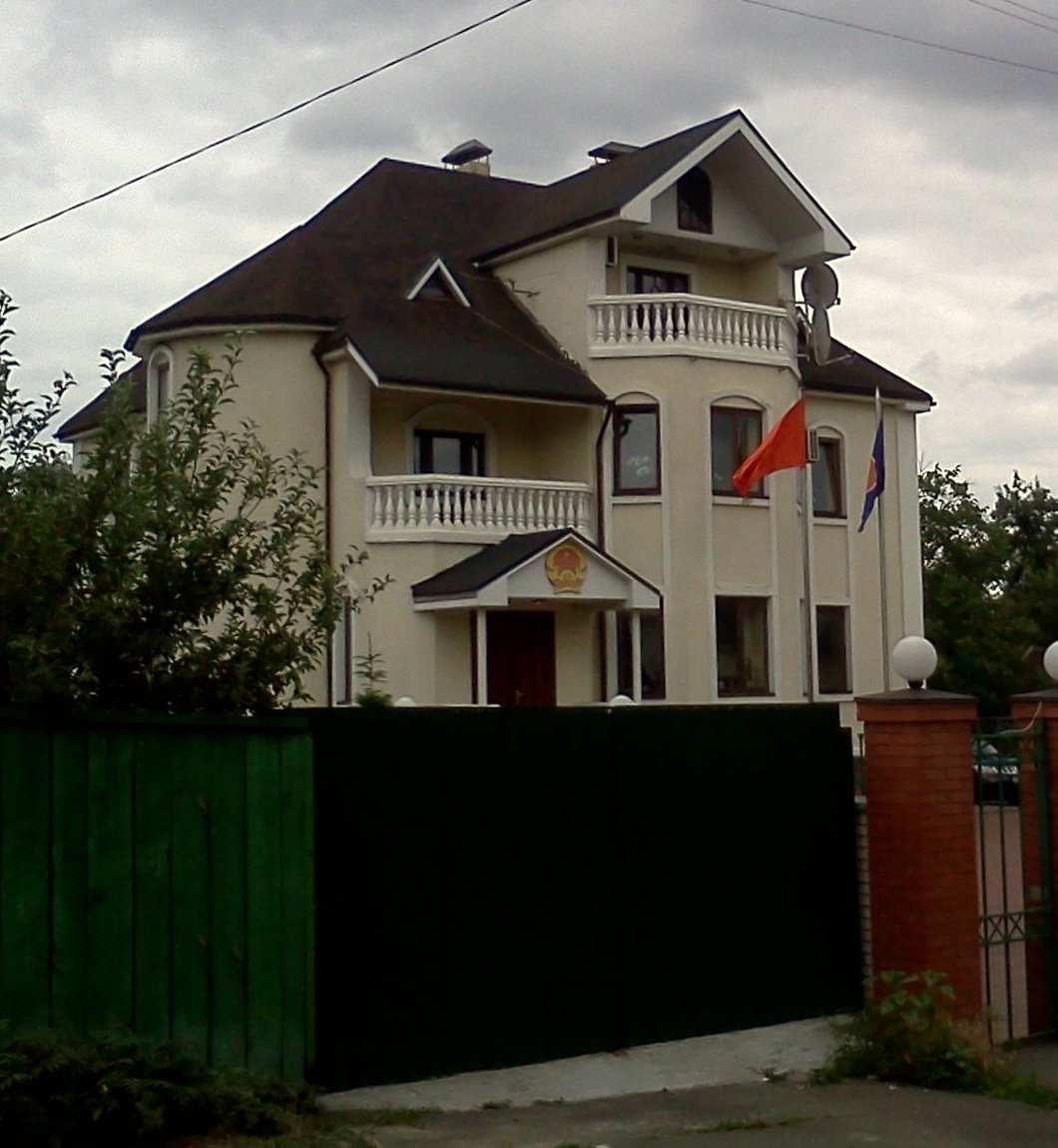
Embassy of Vietnam in Kyiv

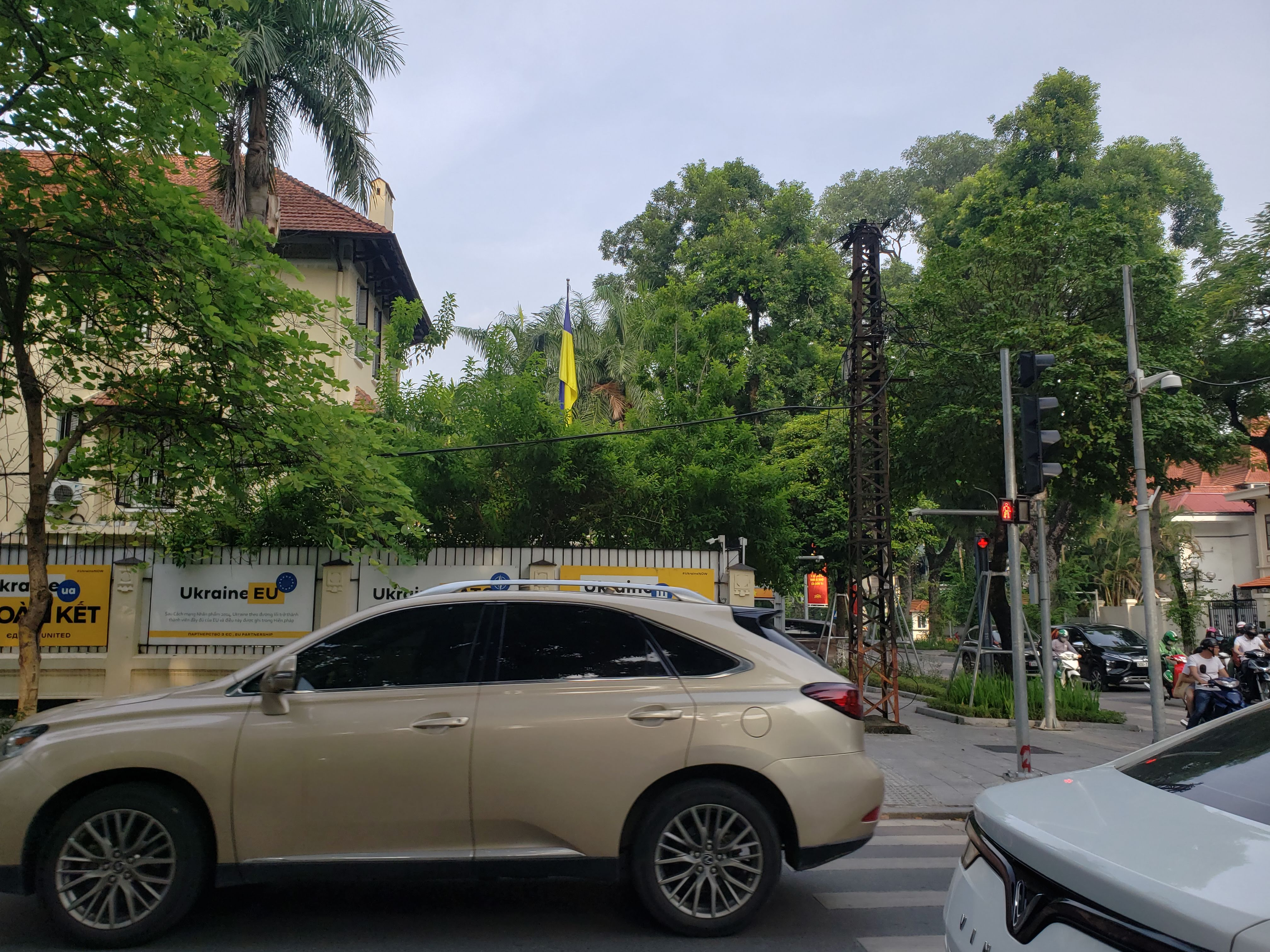
Embassy of Ukraine in Hanoi

Vietnam has maintained good relations with Ukraine since the latter's declaration of independence from the Soviet Union. This is largely due to the existence of Vietnamese people in Ukraine and the fact that Ukraine is a primary supplier of military equipment to Vietnam. Ukraine has played a significant role in helping Vietnam upgrade and modernize its military.

Vietnam has maintained a neutral stance on the Russo-Ukrainian War since 2014, and this stance has remained following the Russian invasion of Ukraine, although the majority of Vietnamese people in Vietnam strongly support Russia and Putin, and in spite of dissidents' and democracy activists' support for Ukraine, as well as their pressure on the Vietnamese government to support Ukrainian territorial integrity.

The two countries have sought to expand their trade and economic ties as of 2018. For Vietnam, Ukraine is an important trade partner in Europe, due to long, historical ties between the two nations, dating back to the Soviet era.

On the sidelines of the World Economic Forum in Davos, Switzerland; meeting between Vietnamese Prime Minister Phạm Minh Chính and Ukrainian president Volodymyr Zelenskyy; the two leaders stressed that the two nations appreciate their traditional friendship and partnership.

Volodymyr Zelenskyy and Pham Minh Chinh discussed the possibility of intensifying bilateral contacts between Ukraine and Vietnam at various levels.

During the Russian invasion of Ukraine, several public opinion brigades' pages on Facebook, originally established to disseminate propaganda for the Communist Party of Vietnam, circulated disinformation in support of the invasion. As the Ukrainian and Russian embassies in Vietnam engage in a social media war in Vietnamese on Facebook, where engagement appeared to favor pro-Russia reactions, the Ukrainian embassy remarked that many negative or mocking comments were not genuine public sentiment but were instead the work of coordinated online networks and automated accounts as part of Russia's broader information warfare strategy.

== High level visits ==
In September 2017, the Ukrainian Minister of Foreign Affairs, Pavlo Klimkin, visited Vietnam and met with Vietnamese Prime Minister Nguyễn Xuân Phúc.

== Diaspora ==
=== Vietnamese community in Ukraine ===
The 2001 Ukrainian census counted 4,000 Vietnamese people. As of 2022, according to the Vietnamese Ministry of Foreign Affairs, there are approximately 7,000 Vietnamese in Ukraine. According to Ukraine-Vietnam Association, prior to the February 2022 Russian invasion of Ukraine the Vietnamese community numbered about 100,000 people. One of the largest Vietnamese communities in Ukraine is in Kharkiv were Vietnamese traders dominate the Barabashovo market, one of the largest markets in Europe. At the market most of these (Vietnamese) traders use a Ukrainianised version of their names.

Ukrainians regard the Vietnamese community positively, based on historical commonality and the legacy of Soviet influence between two. The Vietnamese community also serves as a bridge connecting Vietnamese populations in other Slavic nations such as Poland, Russia, and Czechia, where large Vietnamese diasporas exist.

Vietnamese began coming to the Soviet Union in the 1950s to study, usually for technical professions. In 1985, the Soviet Union signed an agreement with Vietnam to allow gifted Vietnamese students to study or work in the country. This led to the formation of Vietnamese communities in the former Soviet Union, the largest of which are in Kharkiv, Odesa, and Kyiv. Notably, billionaire Phạm Nhật Vượng lived in Kharkiv during the 1990s. There he started the Mivina brand of instant noodles, which became a hit with Ukrainians during the early post-communist years.

=== Ukrainian community in Vietnam ===
As of 2016, approximately 2,000 Ukrainians in total are estimated to live in Vietnam, including 120 people in the consular register of the Embassy of Ukraine in Vietnam.

In Vietnam there are neither organizations of Ukrainian community, nor religious communities of immigrants from Ukraine, partly due to its large distance and lack of interests.

The vast majority of Ukrainians in Vietnam are labor migrants. They mainly consider their stay in Vietnam as temporary and plan to return home after labor contracts with employers conclude. Ukrainian citizens work in the fields of tourism, trade, maritime transport, coal and petroleum, and a small number of them are engaged in business. A small number of Ukrainians belong to mixed Ukrainian-Vietnamese families.

Ukrainian citizens are most numerous in the cities of Nha Trang (about 100 people), Vũng Tàu (about 100), Hanoi (about 50), and Ho Chi Minh (50).

== Resident diplomatic missions ==
- Ukraine has an embassy in Hanoi.
- Vietnam has an embassy in Kyiv.

== See also ==
- Foreign relations of Ukraine
- Foreign relations of Vietnam
