= Myanmar–Vietnam relations =

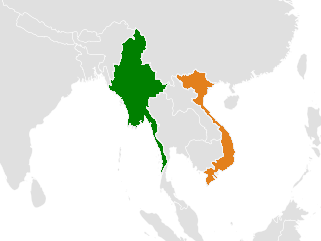
- Myanmar: Vietnam

Diplomatic mission
- Embassy of Myanmar, Hanoi: Embassy of Vietnam, Yangon

Myanmar–Vietnam relations refer to the historical and current relationship between Myanmar and Vietnam. Both are members of the ASEAN and have engaged in relationship between two countries. Myanmar has an embassy in Hanoi and a consulate general in Hồ Chí Minh City while Vietnam maintains their embassy in Yangon.

== History ==
In 1462, Vietnamese emperor Lê Thánh Tông while camping in today Laotian-Burmese border, he sent a welcome letter to the king of Ava in Central Myanmar.

The first Burmese embassy to Vietnam was 1822-1823 led by George Gibson, who was the son of an English mercenary, which arrived Saigon. The Burmese king at the time was Bagyidaw. He was very keen to conquer Siam and hoped Vietnam might be a useful ally. Vietnam had then just annexed Cambodia. The Vietnamese emperor was Minh Mạng, who had just taken the throne after the death of his father, the founder of the Nguyen dynasty Gia Long. A commercial delegation from Vietnam has recently been in Burma, eager to expand the trade in birds nests. Bagyidaw's interest in sending a return mission however was to secure a military alliance.

In the late 19th century, both became colonies of Britain and France.

== Modern relations ==
Since the Vietnamese economic reform at 1986, they focus on industrialization as a condition for communism, which can't be established in a peasant society, while Burma (later becomes Myanmar) had suffered significant economic setback after the failed 8888 Uprising. The State Peace and Development Council ruling Burma had maintained cordial tie with Vietnam and several Burmese military figures, notably Khin Nyunt, had paid visits to Vietnam in order to learn from Vietnam's economic reforms successes.

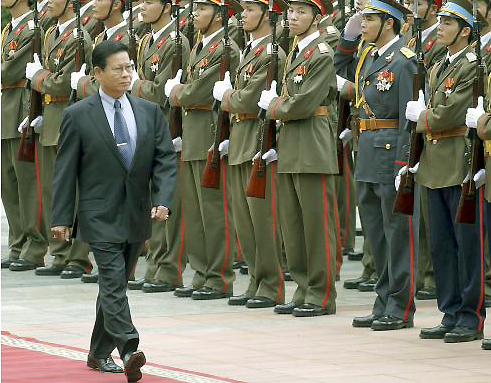
Khin Nyunt reviews a Vietnamese honor guard at the Presidential Palace in Hanoi, Vietnam

=== Since 2011 ===
The political reforms in Myanmar had changed political climate of Myanmar, and Vietnam became an active player. While China, India and Thailand remain as traditional investors to Myanmar, several Vietnamese companies like Viettel and Hoang Anh Gia Lai Group have increased activities in Myanmar. Viettel has become one of 5 largest telephone investors in Myanmar while Hoang Anh Gia Lai has become a prominent investor in Myanmar.

Two countries have been engaging in further and deeper cooperations.

Recently there are also increasing military cooperation between two states. The Vietnamese Government, through the military-owned Viettel, has provided arms and equipments, as well as sending military officials to train Burmese soldiers of the Tatmadaw to engage against ethnic rebels amidst the Myanmar civil conflict.
