= Sapa (Prague) =

Vietnamese enclave in the Czech Republic

TTTM Sapa
- Ethnic enclave
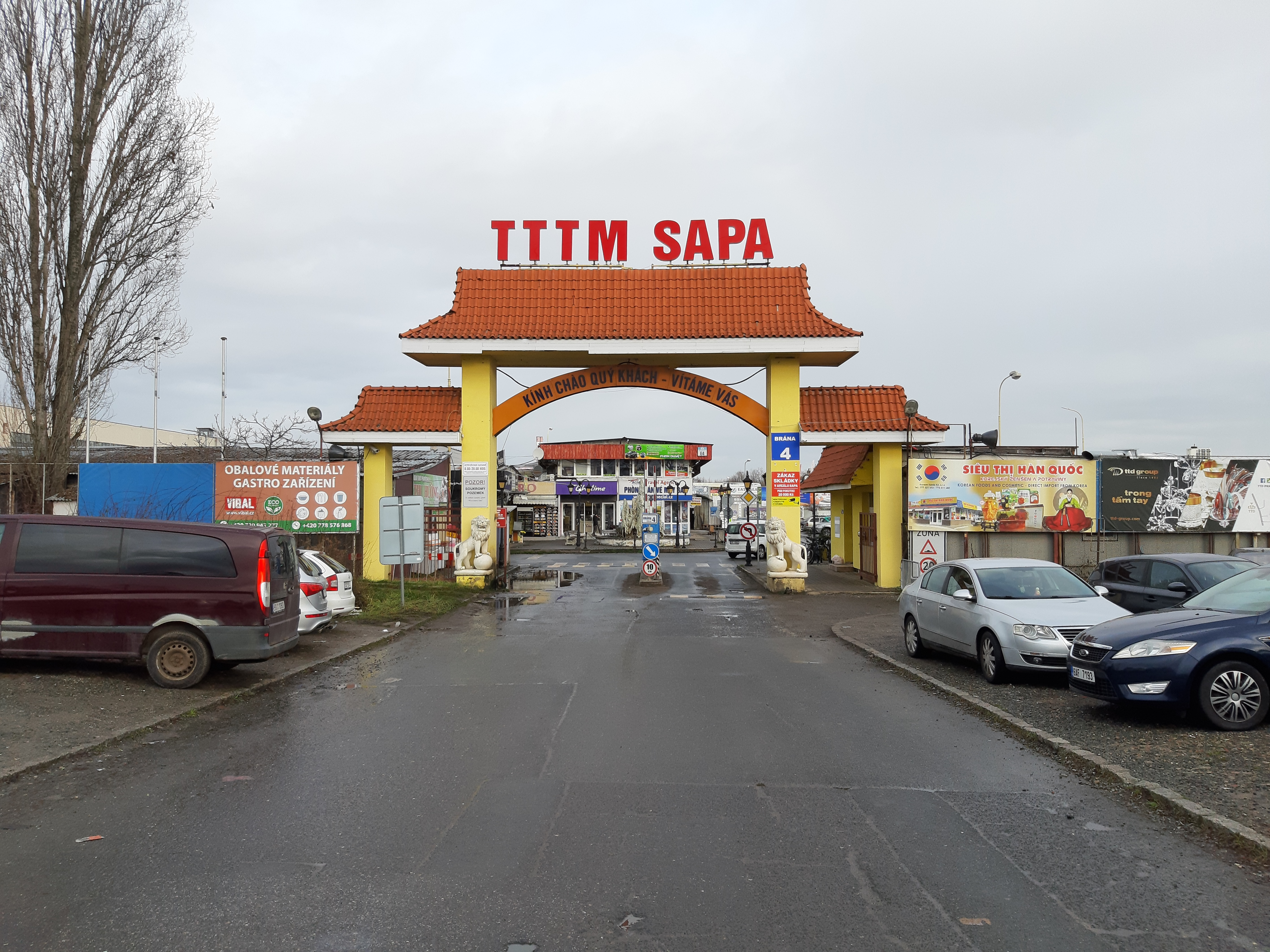
- South entrance to TTTM Sapa, 2023
- Etymology: Sa Pa
- Nicknames: Sapa; Little Hanoi; Prague's Hanoi; Little Saigon
- Interactive map of TTTM Sapa
- Coordinates: 50°0′12″N 14°28′13″E
- Country: Czech Republic
- City: Prague
- District: Prague-Libuš
- Cadastral area: Písnice
- Website: sapapraha.cz

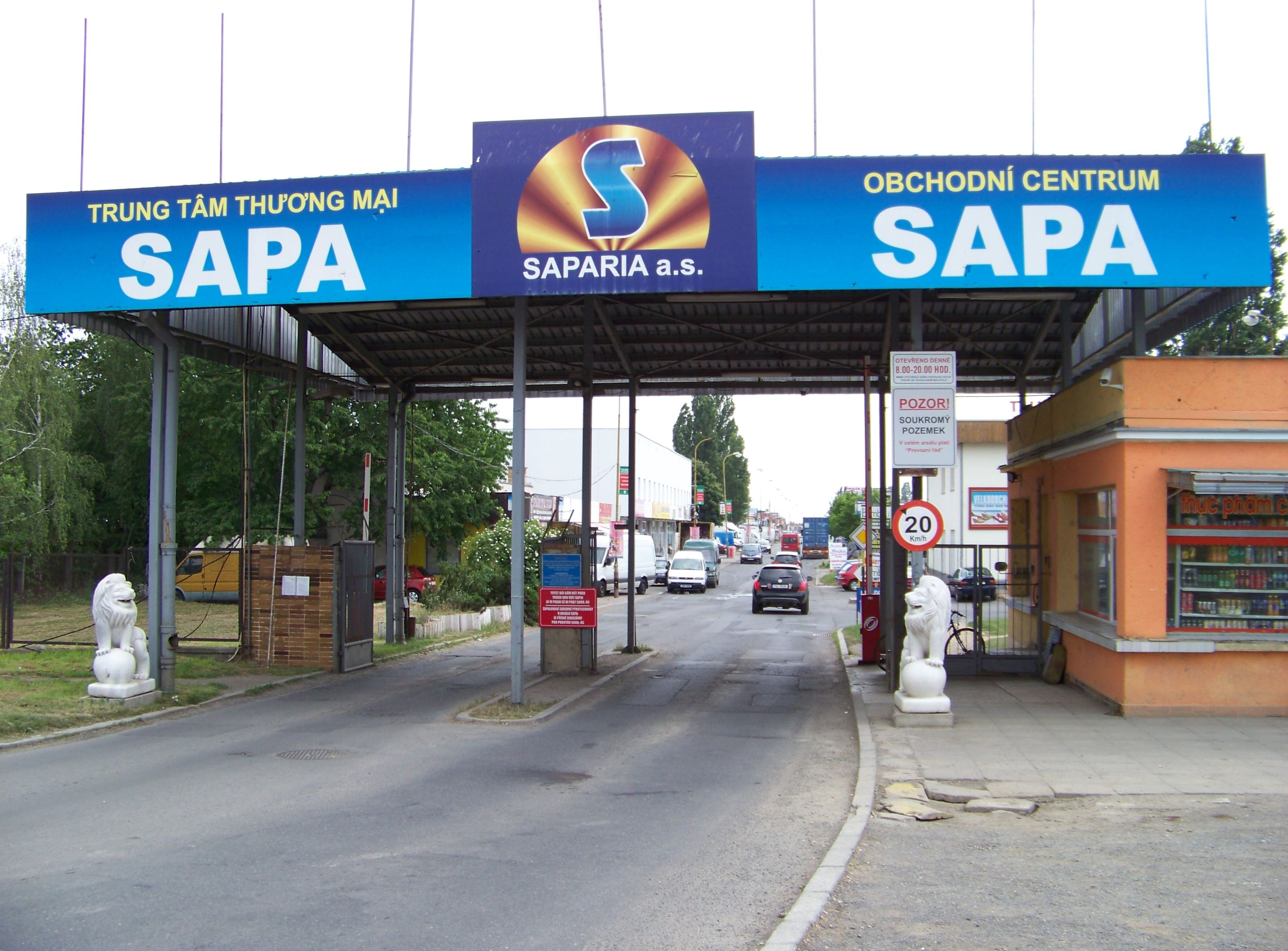
West entrance to TTTM Sapa

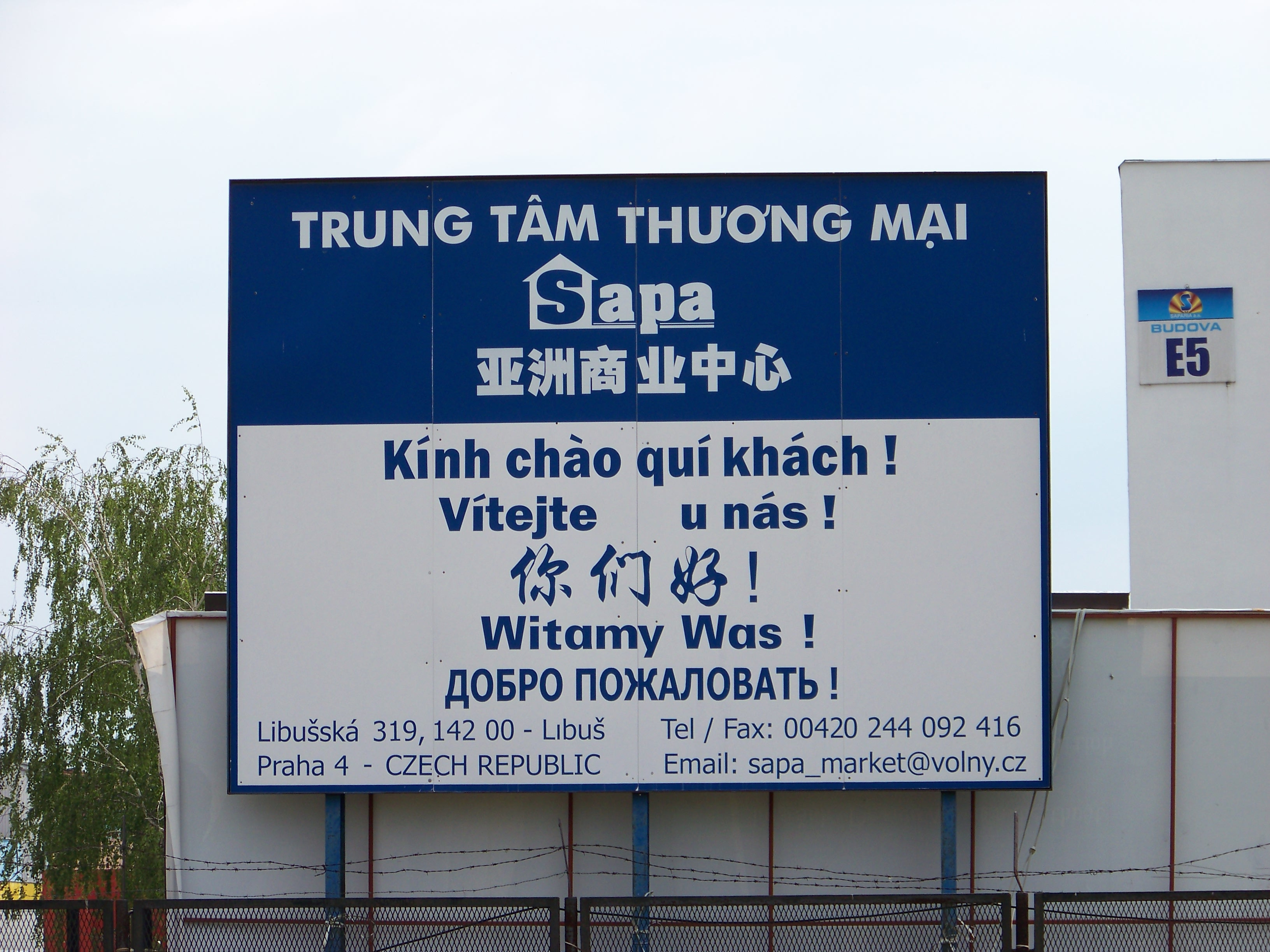
TTTM Sapa welcome sign in Vietnamese, Czech, Chinese, Polish, and Russian

Sapa, officially TTTM Sapa (Vietnamese: Trung Tâm Thương Mại Sapa, Chinese: 中心商賣沙垻), sometimes called Little Hanoi, Little Saigon, or Prague's Hanoi, is the largest Vietnamese enclave in the Czech Republic, located in the Libuš and Kunratice districts. It was created within the area of a former meat-packing plant and poultry farm around 2000 and is often referred to as a "city within a city" by the media. After Ukrainians and Slovaks, Vietnamese are the largest ethnic minority in the country, with Sapa being the so-called Czech "Vietnamese capital". Sapa offers many restaurants, food stands, specialized grocery stores, a warehouse club called Tamda Foods, tutoring and childcare services, space for social events, and a Buddhist temple. The total area is 35 hectares (86 acres), and as of 2012, around seven thousand people lived and worked there.

== Description ==
As of 2012, over 7,000 people, mostly Vietnamese, were doing business in Sapa, in an area of approximately 35 hectares. The compound includes shops selling clothes, household goods, books, and food, and there are numerous restaurants as well as a warehouse club called Tamda Foods. Sapa also offers services such as travel and insurance agencies, international remittances, hairdressers and nail salons, legal consulting, a post office, a wedding hall, a kindergarten, Vietnamese periodicals, a recording studio, and a Buddhist temple. The area also has several gambling halls.

== History ==
=== Origins of Sapa: 1990s–2000s ===
The area currently occupied by Sapa in Písnice used to be a meat-packing plant and a poultry farm, which ceased to operate in 1999 and 2007, respectively. The premises of both establishments were subsequently acquired by the Vietnamese company Saparia, and the area began its transformation into a center for trade, food, services, and culture.

On 17 April 2012, the civic associations META and Klub Hanoi organized a guided tour of Sapa for the public, whose aim was to show that the area was not a "wild Asian jungle". Visitors had the opportunity to visit the kindergarten, the Buddhist temple, and a shop selling traditional Vietnamese food.

Since 2016, regular tours have been organized by the Sapa Trip group to introduce visitors not only to the area itself but also to Vietnamese cuisine and the community's culture in the Czech Republic.

=== Unrealized expansion plan: 2011–2012 ===
In November 2011, Saparia announced that it had submitted a plan for the redevelopment of the site to the Ministry of the Environment as part of an environmental impact assessment process, and that it was preparing materials for a major modernization of Sapa. The site was to be expanded by several hectares, and the redevelopment was to be completed by 2020. Saparia purchased land for the purpose, and among other things, the plan called for the construction of the largest Buddhist temple in the Czech Republic. However, municipal and district authorities decided to prevent the expansion due to allegations made by the Czech secret service of the presence of illicit drugs, money laundering, and tax evasion, as well as the possibility of organized crime activity. Then-district mayor, Petr Mráz, claimed that crime was on the rise within the enclave.

=== Prague Metro Line D: 2022–2036 ===
The ongoing expansion of the Prague Metro, whose new Line D will include the stop Písnice, is set to be complete in 2036. The new line is predicted to improve access to the community.

=== Phạm Minh Chính visit: 2025 ===
In January 2025, Vietnamese Prime Minister Phạm Minh Chính visited Sapa as part of his visit to the Czech Republic upon the invitation of Prime Minister Petr Fiala. He was joined by a number of Vietnamese ministers, trade representatives, and journalists.

== Incidents and issues ==
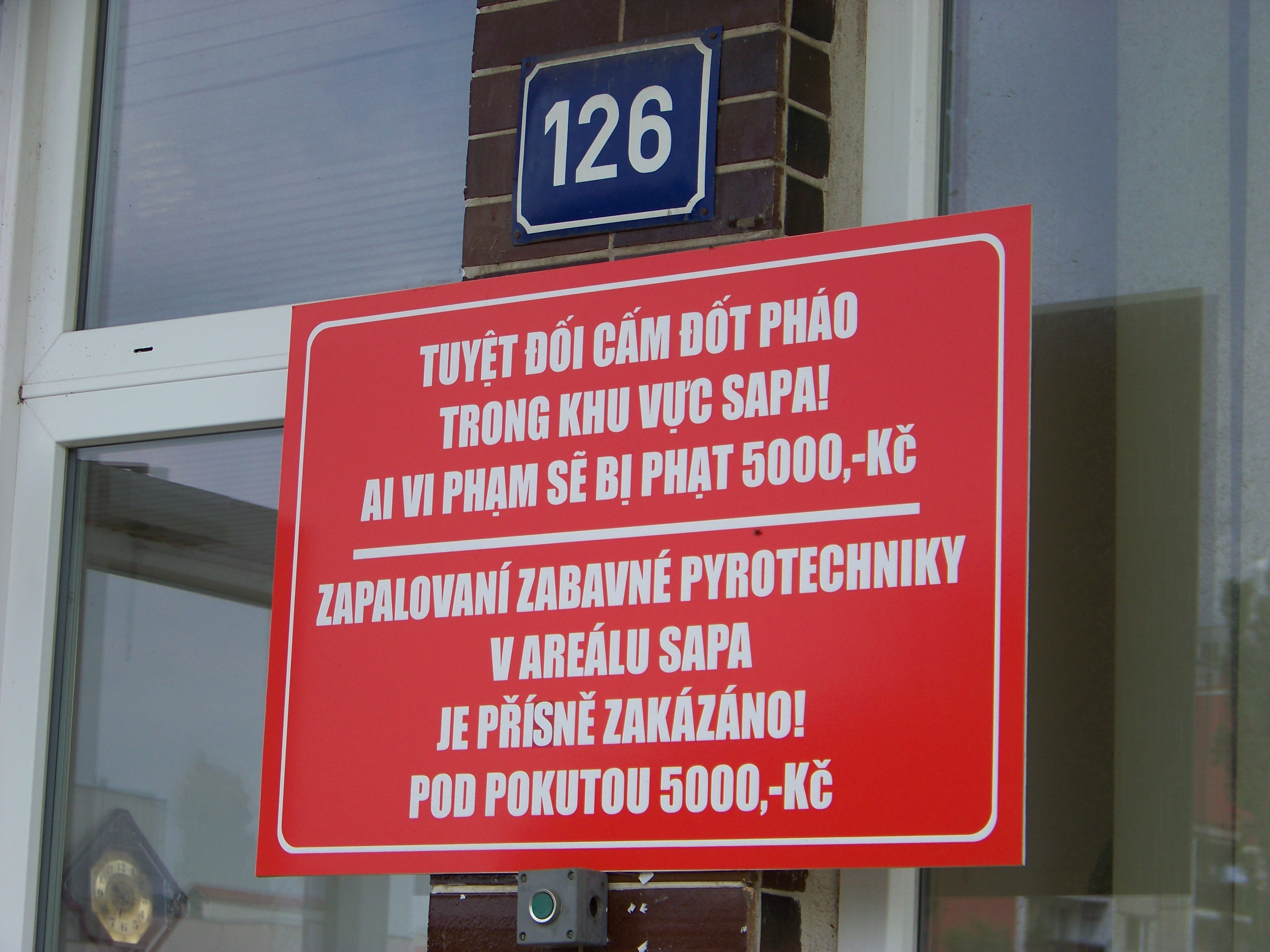
Fire prevention measures implemented after the 2008 fires

=== Fires ===
In September 1999, on the basis of perceived risk within the compound, the Prague Fire Brigade organized a fire drill in Sapa.

November 1999

On 20 November 1999, a fire broke out in Sapa, as a result of an explosion. It spread extremely quickly, and a total of 21 firefighting units intervened. Eight firefighters were injured, two of them seriously. The damage was estimated at 200 million crowns, and the cause of the fire was determined to be arson.

September 2008

Another fire erupted on 7 September 2008, during a renovation of the main hall, with 80% of Prague's firefighters taking turns putting it out. Three safety inspections were subsequently conducted, and the site operator was fined 250,000 crowns.

November 2008

Yet another conflagration occurred within the hall on 6 November, with no loss of life. The firefighting operation was one of the largest in Czech history. 954 firefighters from 81 units and 6 regions participated; the full firefighting effort lasted 181 hours. According to several reports, the smoke could be smelled across Prague. The police investigation ruled out arson and stated that the cause of the fire was either negligence or technical defects. The site operator was fined half a million CZK, and the total damage exceeded 200 million CZK.

June 2018

A minor fire broke out in Sapa's main hall on 11 June 2018. The cause of the fire was deemed to be faulty electrical wiring, and the damage was estimated at several tens of thousands of crowns.

June 2024

On 10 June 2024, two stalls within Sapa burned down, causing estimated damage of two million crowns.

December 2024

On 24 December 2024, a warehouse caught fire in Sapa, and a two-alarm fire was declared. The owner of the warehouse was injured, and property damage was estimated at three million crowns.

=== Legal issues ===
Sapa has frequently been accused of harboring a variety of illegal activity, and it has been plagued with problems involving illicit drugs, prostitution, unsanitary conditions, money laundering, tax evasion, the sale of counterfeit goods, and even the occasional murder. The area has at times had its own specialized police unit, which is no longer active.

== In popular culture ==
The 2018 Czech film Miss Hanoi, starring David Novotný and Ha Thanh Špetlíková as a pair of detectives investigating a murder in the Vietnamese community, was filmed in Sapa.

== Gallery ==
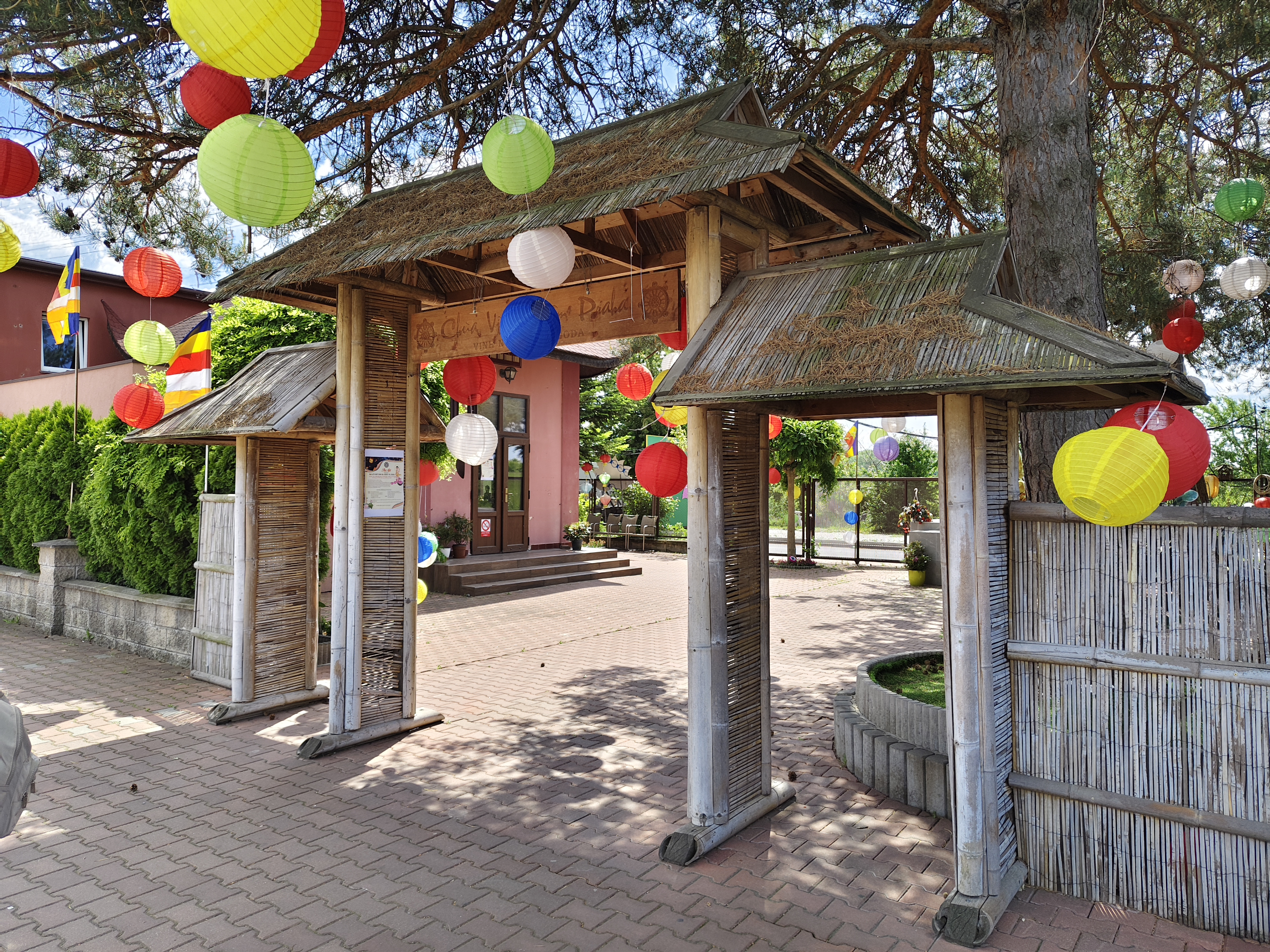
Entrance to the Buddhist temple complex

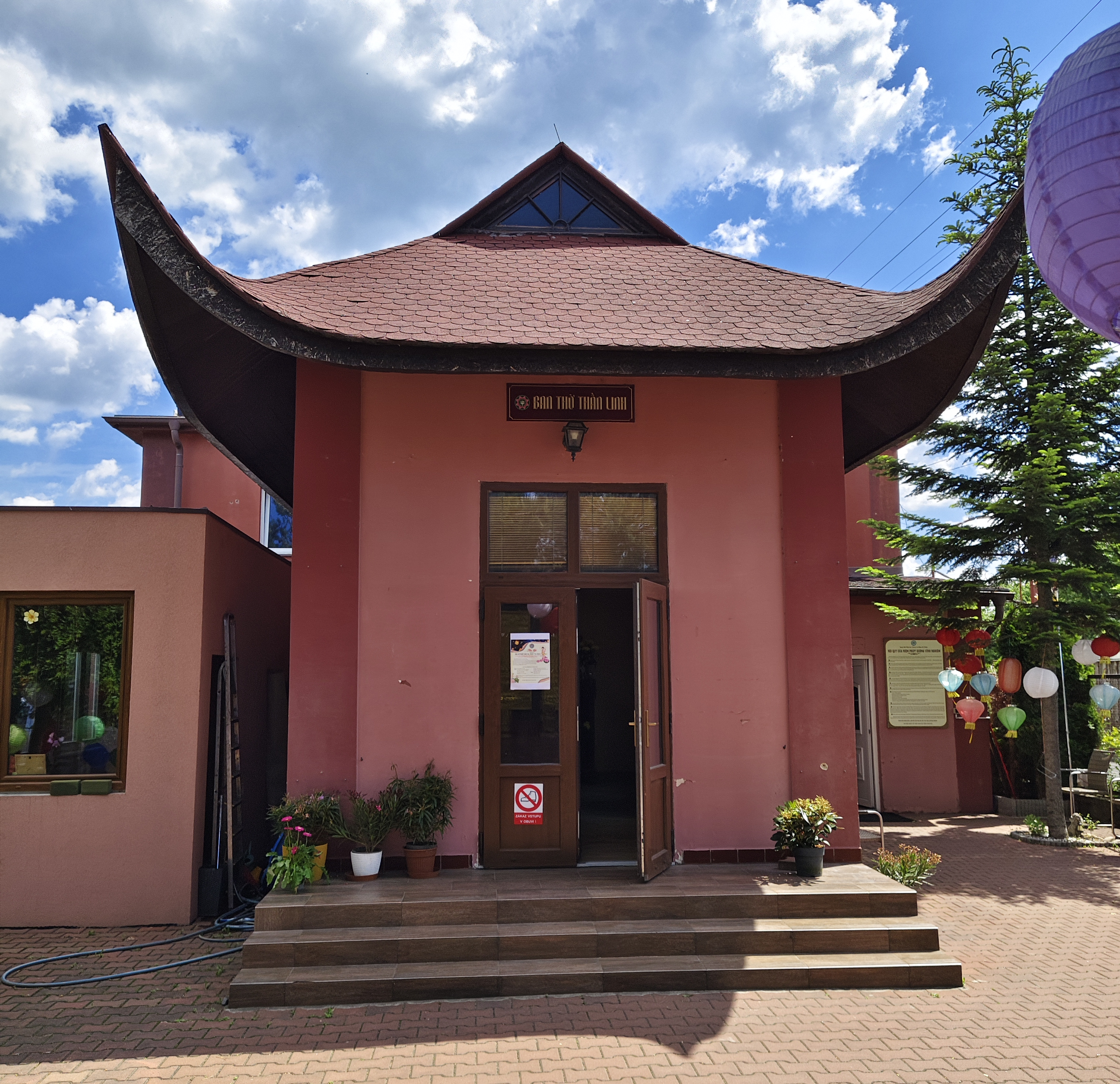
Sapa's Buddhist temple

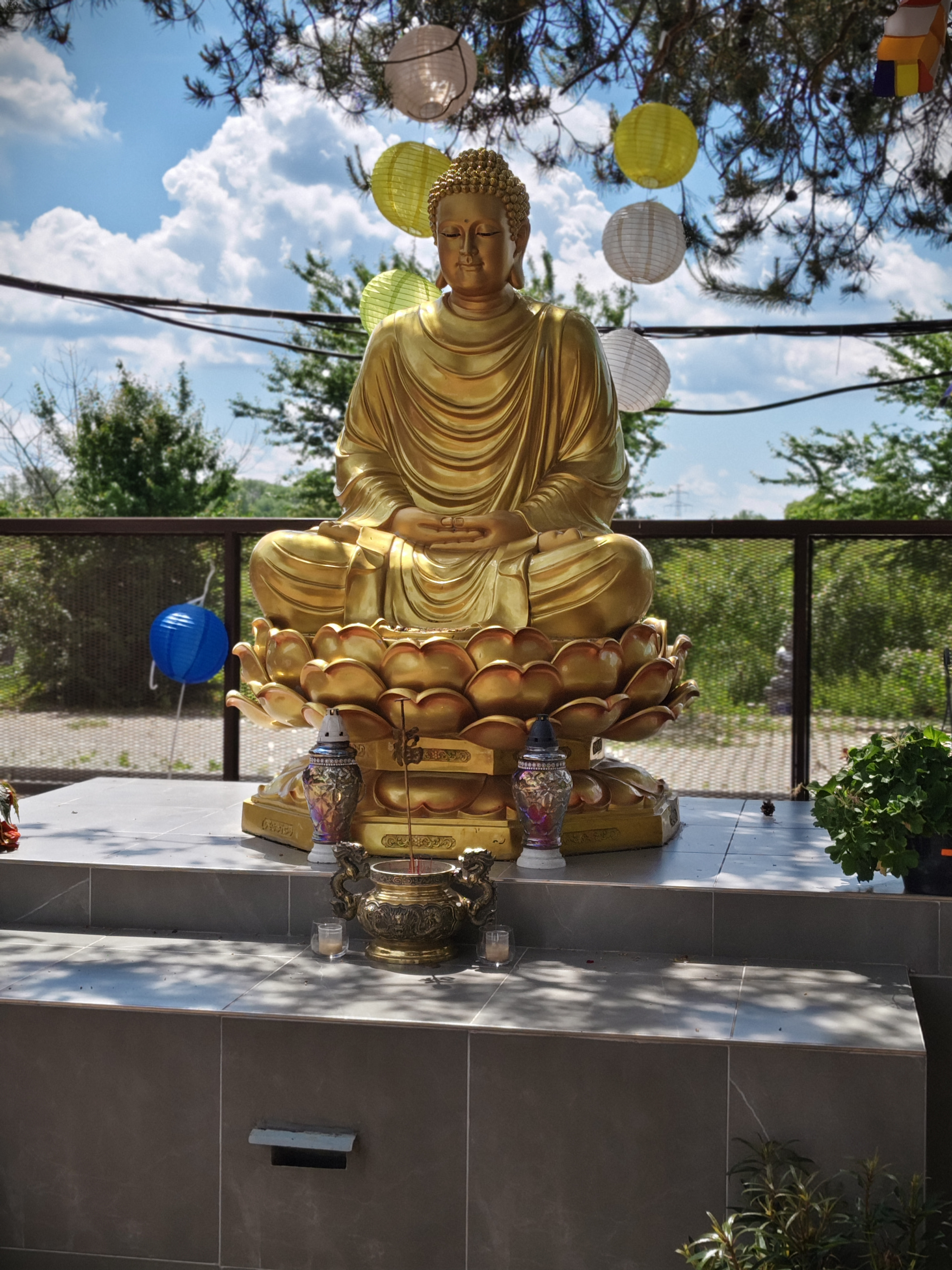
Statue of Buddha

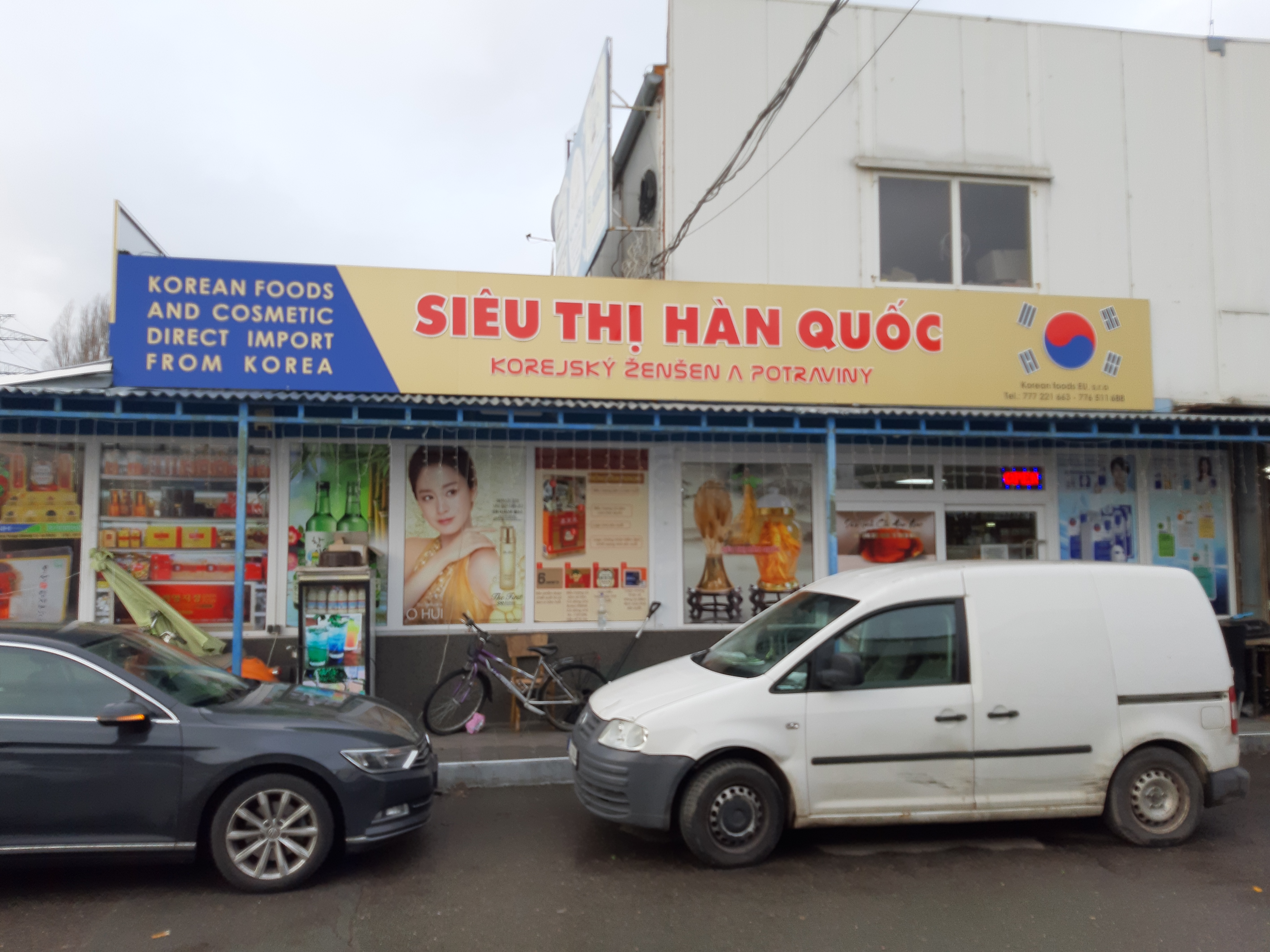
Korean store in Sapa

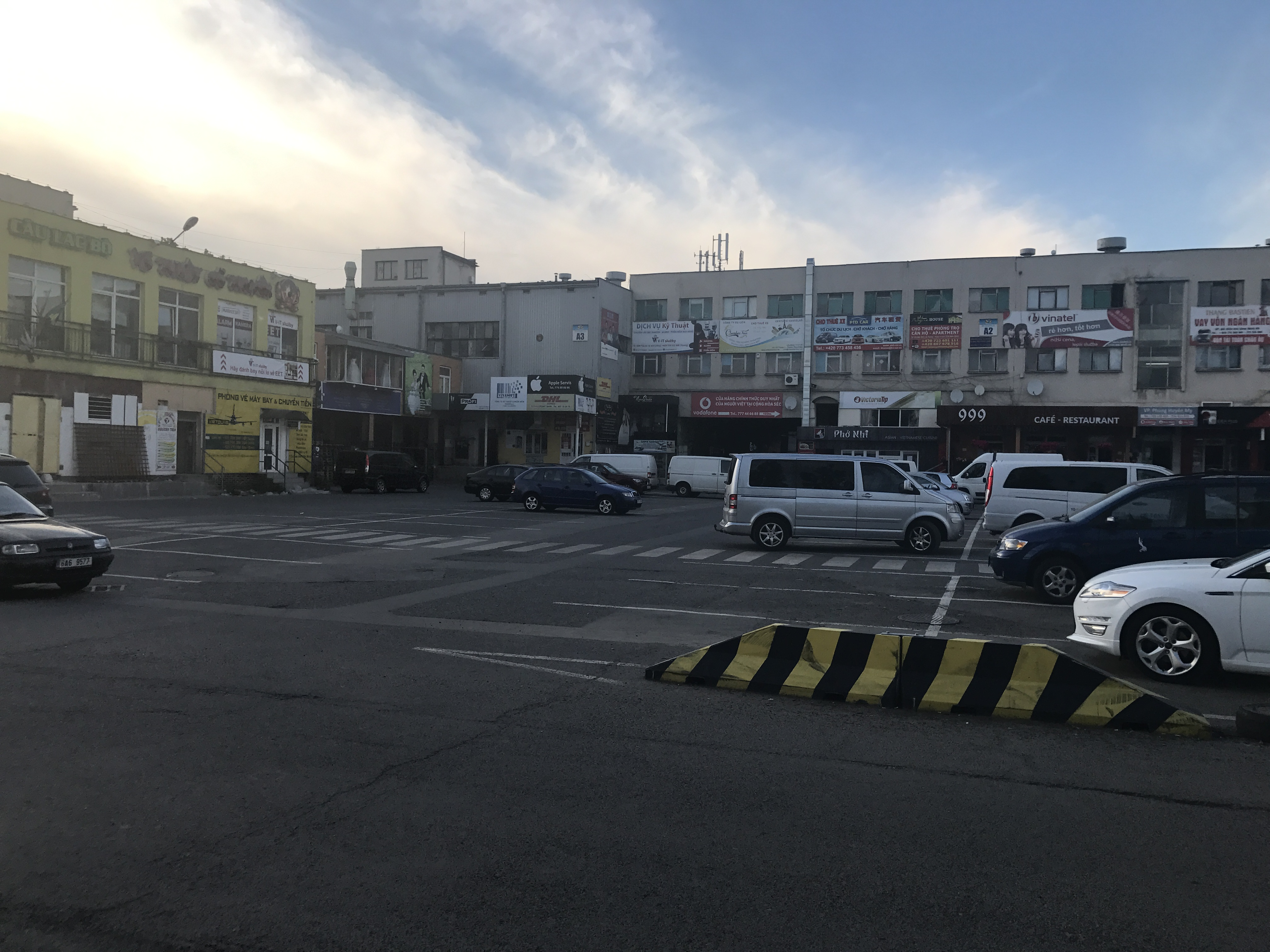
Shops inside Sapa

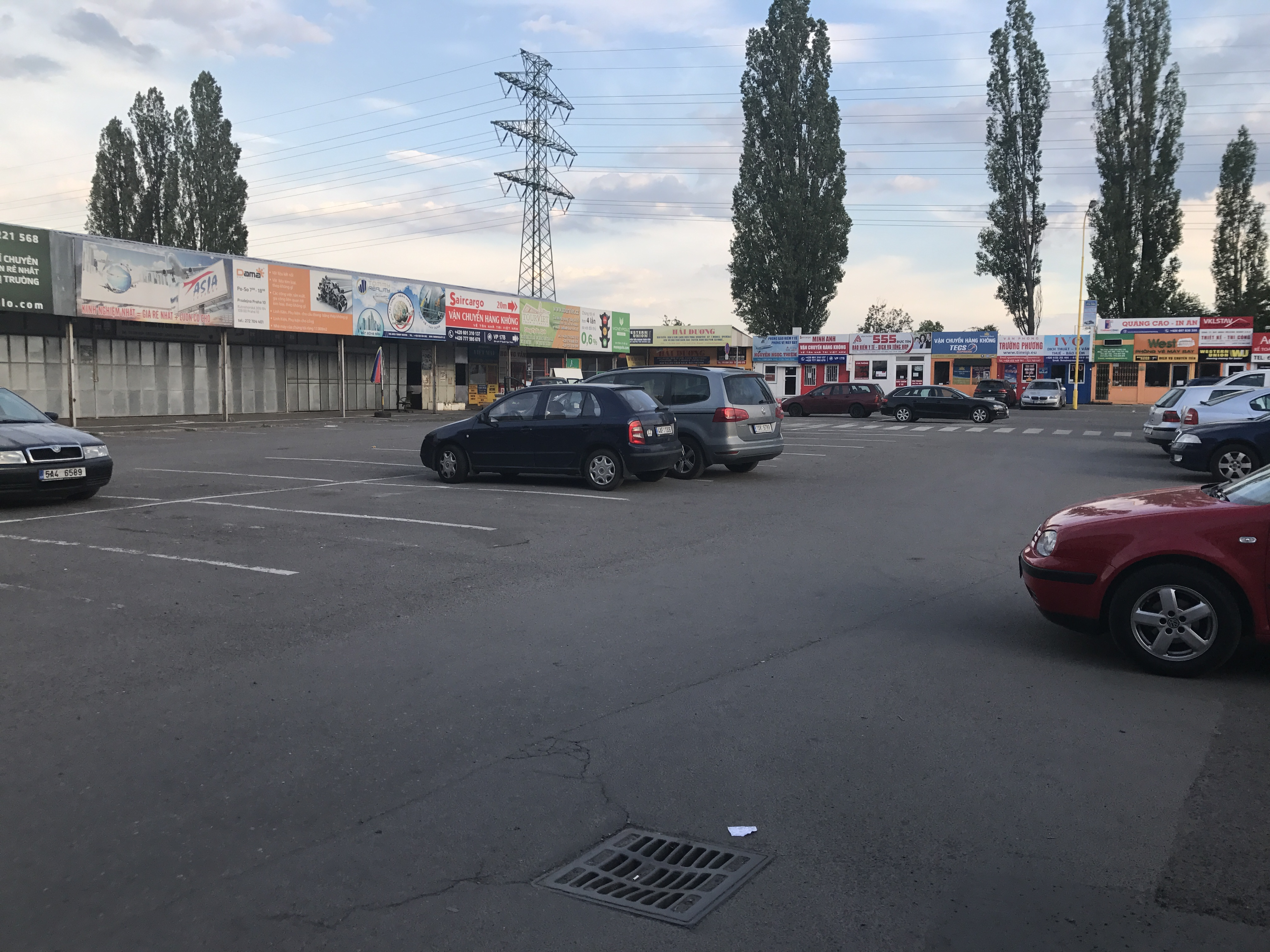
Shops inside Sapa

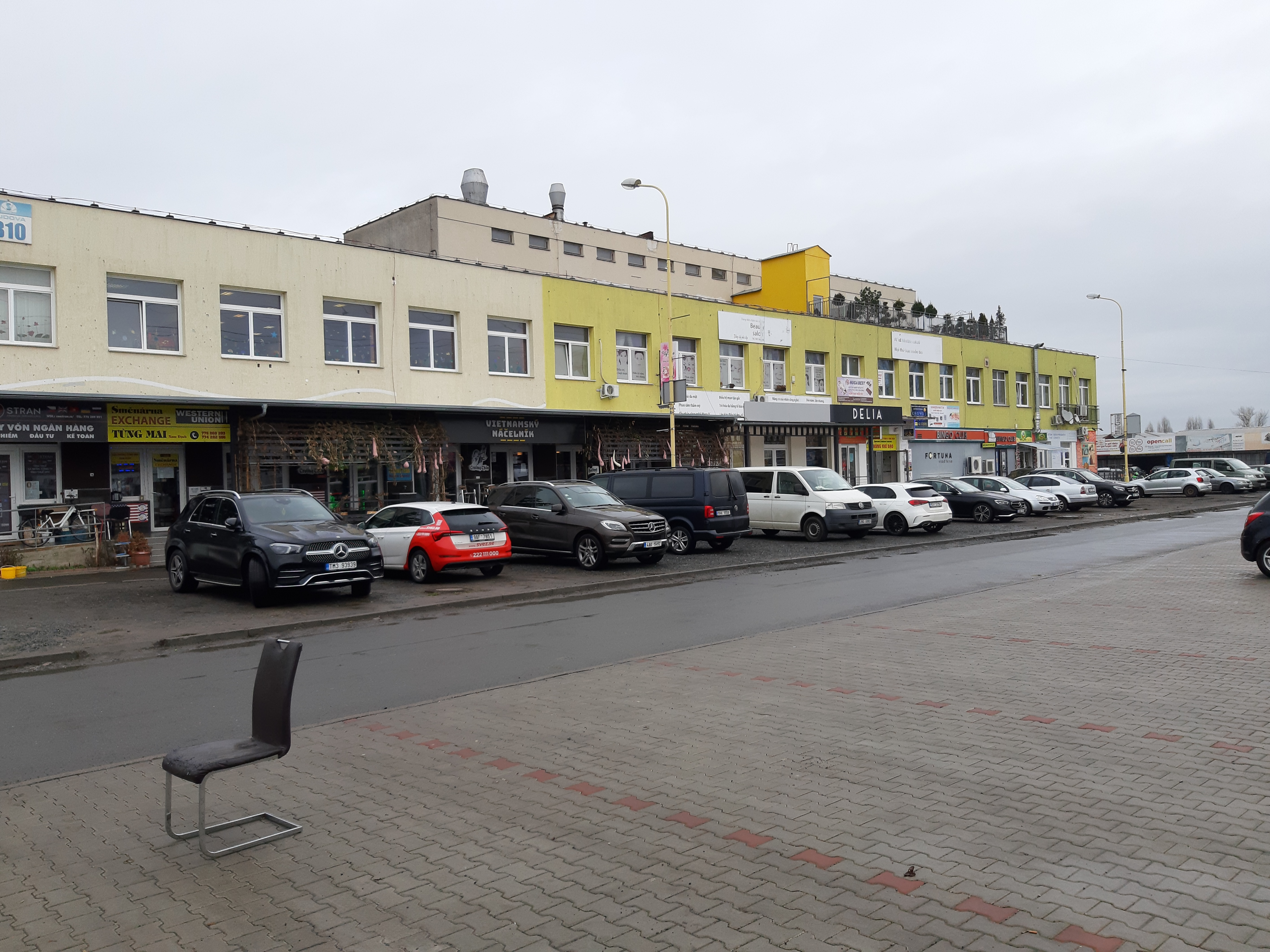
Shops inside Sapa

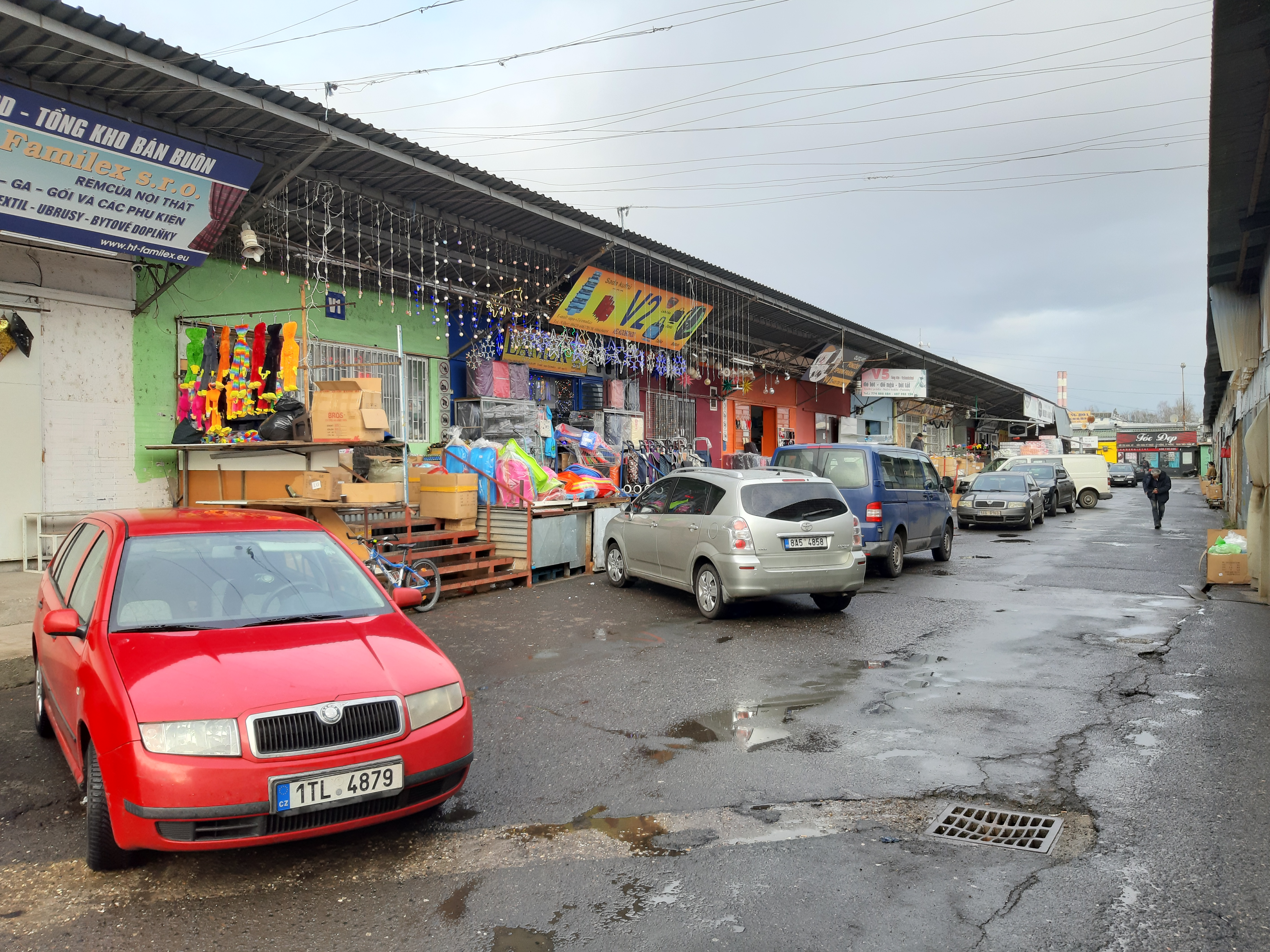
Shops inside Sapa

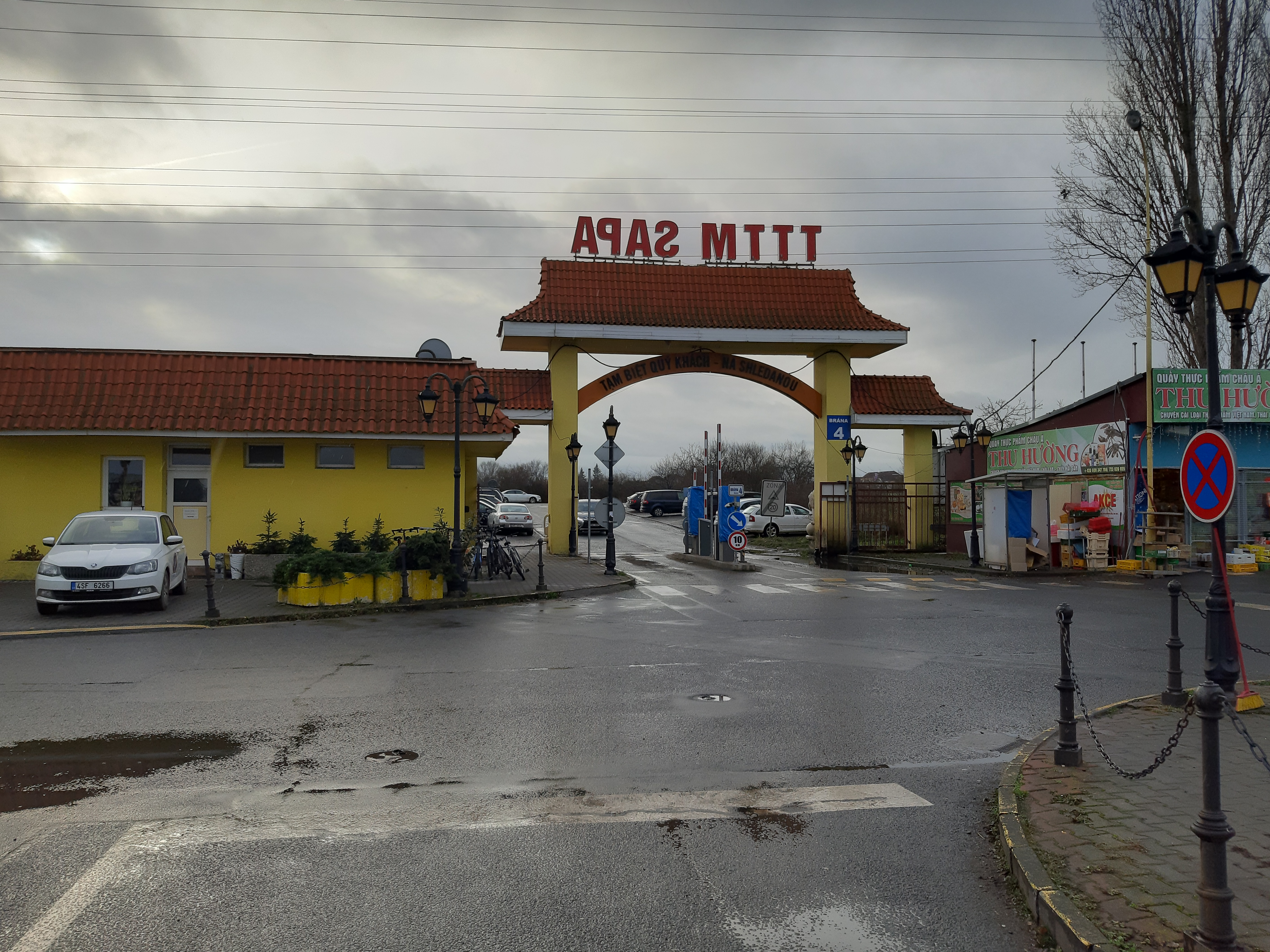
View of the south entrance from the inside

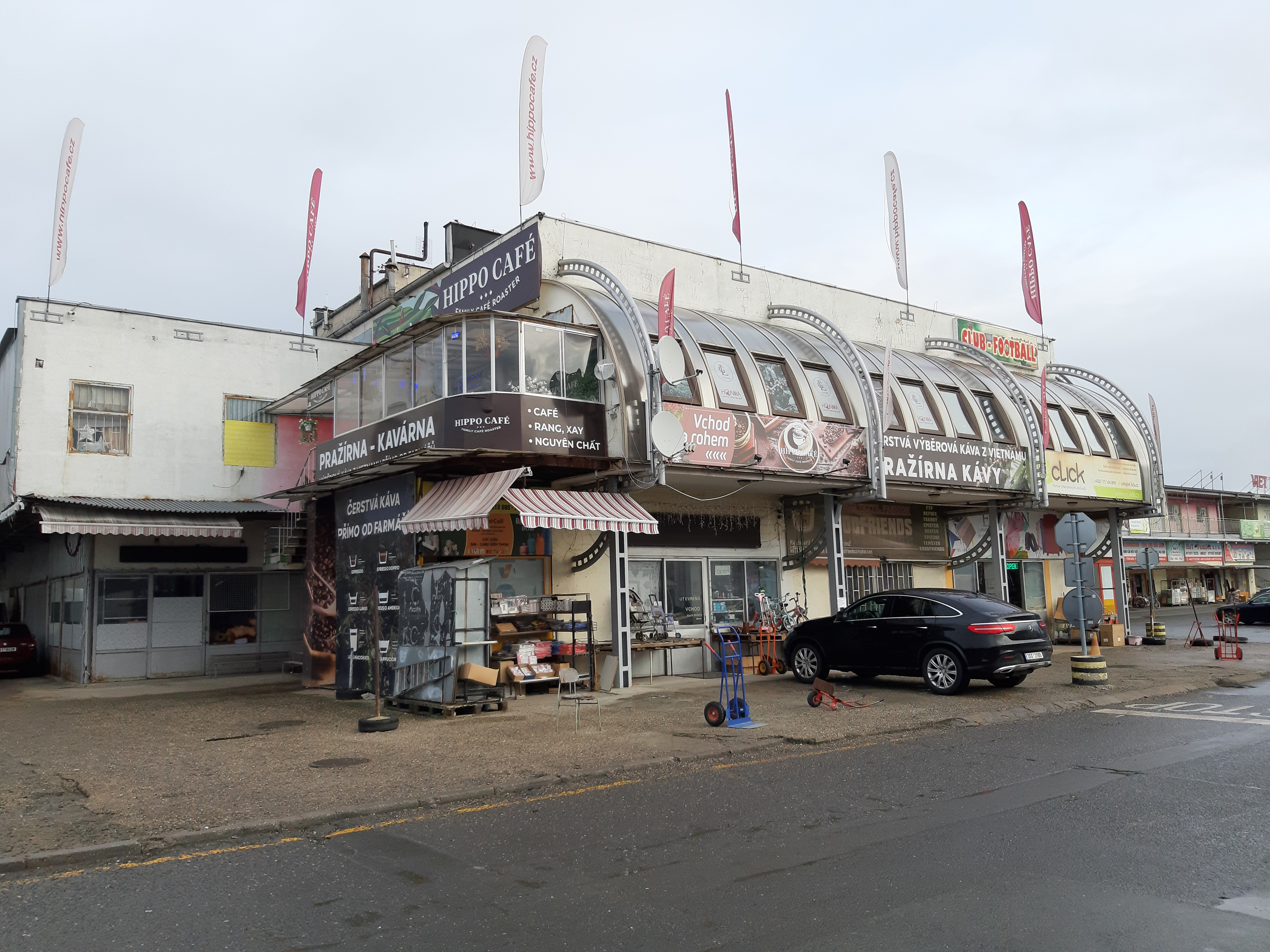
Hippo cafe

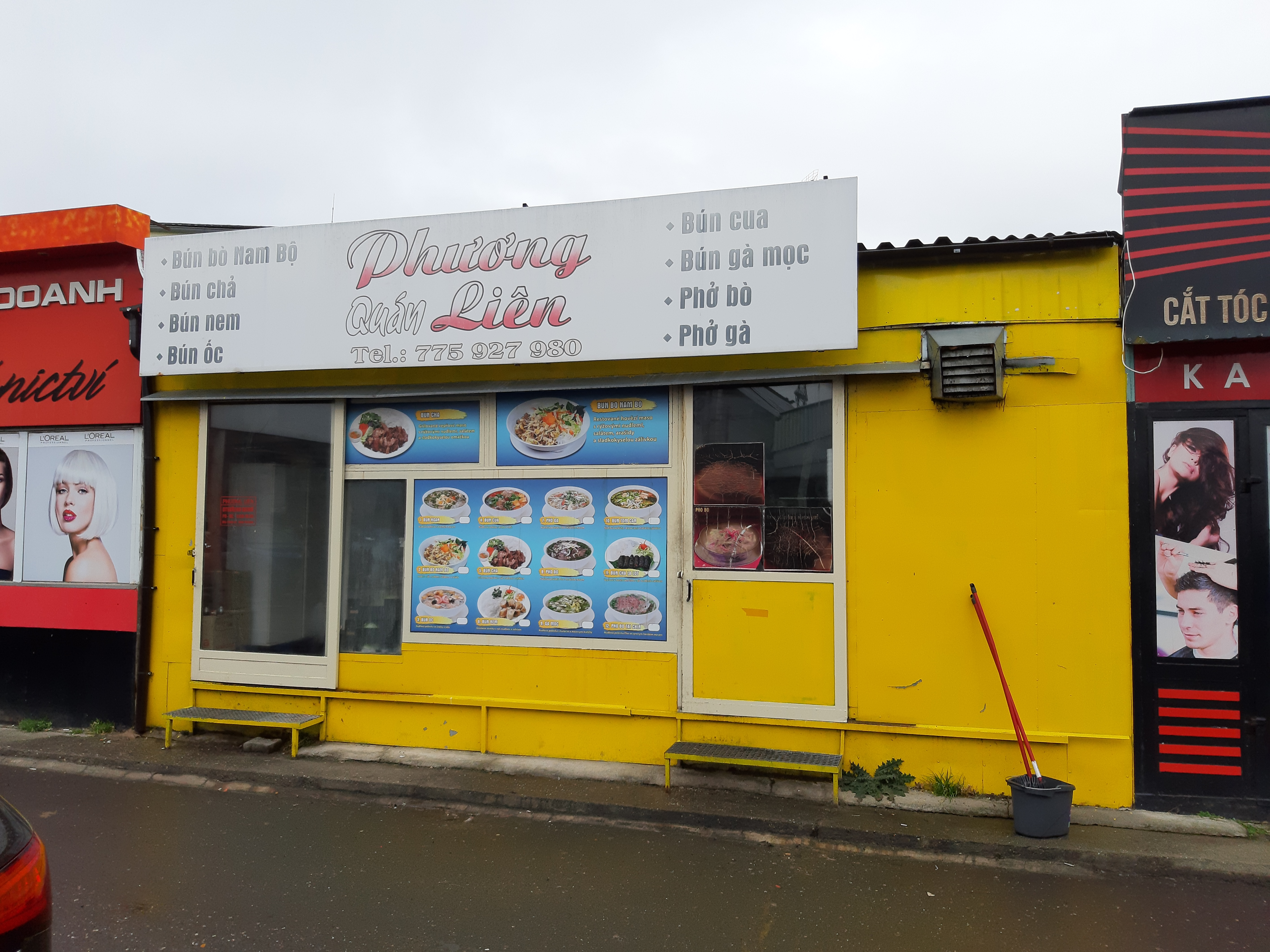
Phương Liȇn restaurant

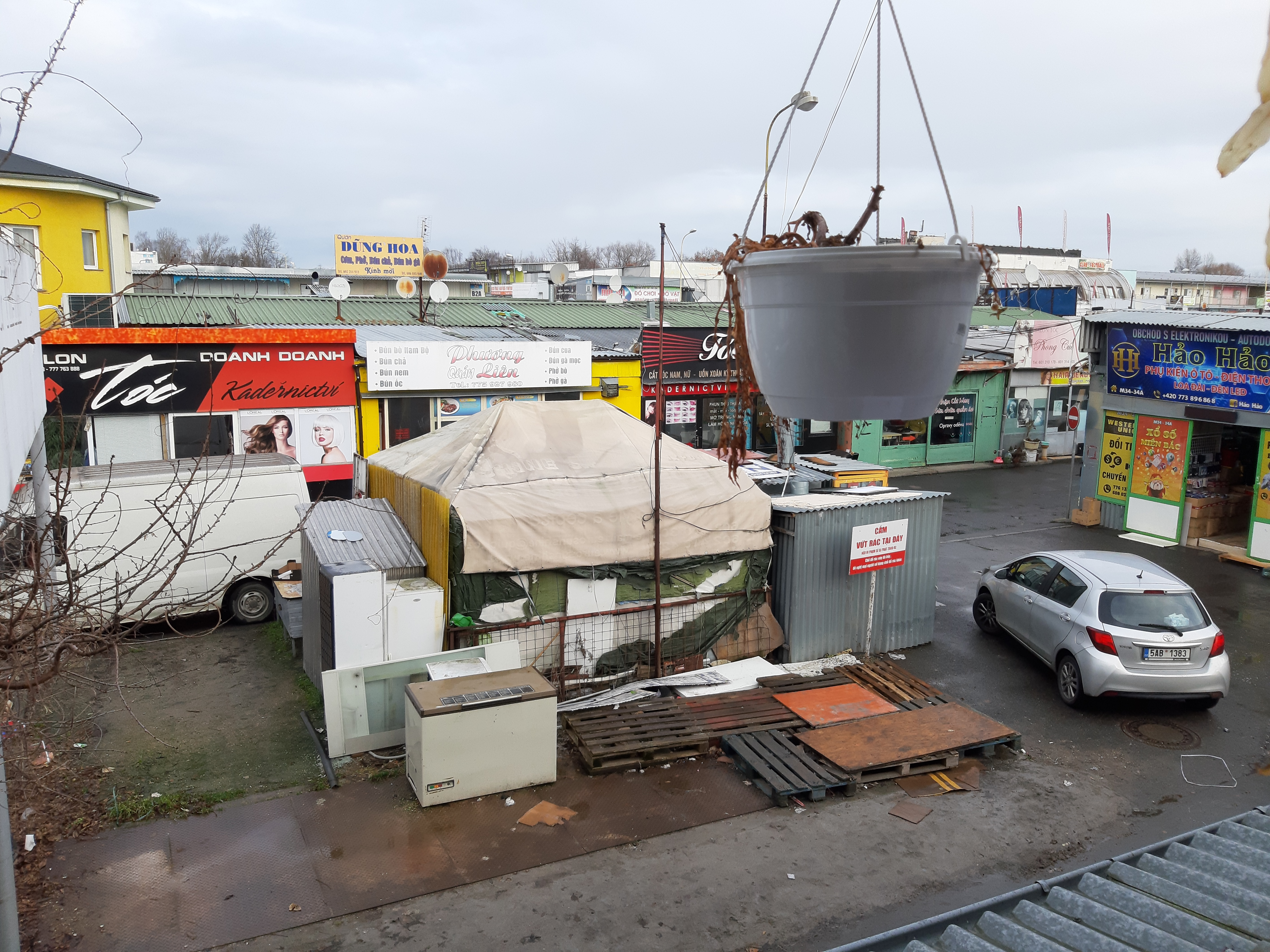
Aerial view

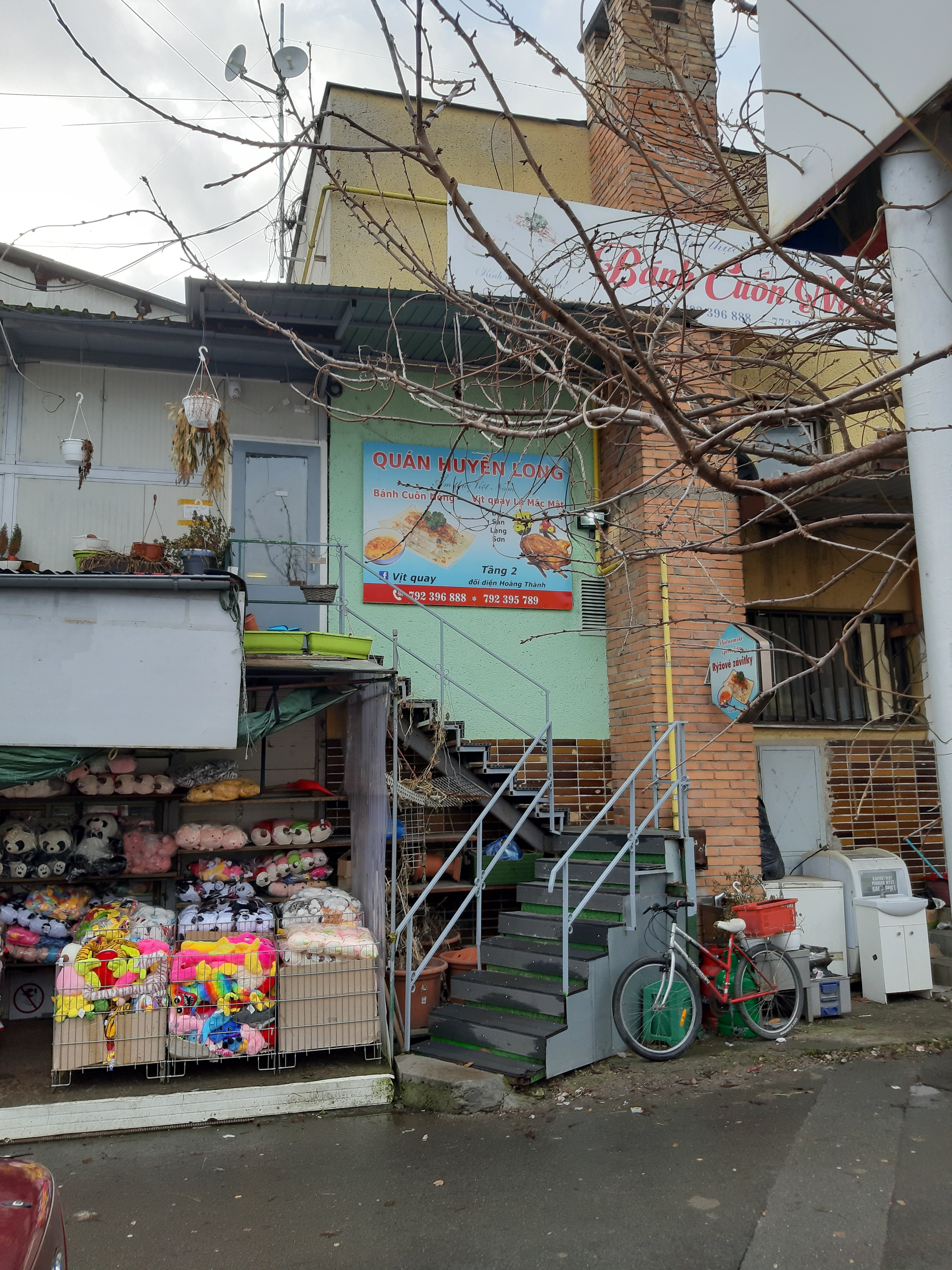
