= Chinese people in the Czech Republic =

Ethnic group

Total population
- 7,485 (2018)

Regions with significant populations
- Prague

Languages
- Chinese, Czech

Related ethnic groups
- Overseas Chinese

Chinese people in the Czech Republic form one of the country's smaller migrant communities.

== Migration history ==
A few Chinese settled in Czechoslovakia prior to World War II. They consisted largely of overland migrants from Wenzhou, Zhejiang. Most were Catholics. They came largely as travelling salesmen to the Bohemia region; some married local women and settled down. Up to the 1940s, a few more Chinese arrived, for example as acrobats with travelling circuses. However, most of them left the country when the war broke out. The few who did remain fled to Western Europe after the Communist takeover, when their businesses were confiscated. Due to the worsening Sino-Soviet split of the 1960s, there was little further contact between Czechoslovakia and the People's Republic of China.

Hungary, rather than Czechoslovakia, was the initial hub of the post-1989 Chinese community in Eastern Europe, due to their policy of offering visa-free entry to PRC nationals; as many as 45,000 Chinese may have arrived in Hungary by 1992, largely shuttle traders and migrant workers. However, when that visa-free policy was terminated, the Chinese began to spread out to other neighbouring countries, primarily Poland, Romania, and Czechoslovakia. They consisted not of poor rural migrants, as was the common image in the popular imagination, but rather of former civil servants and workers in state-owned enterprise, who were giving up their "iron rice bowls" to go abroad and try to get rich as traders. In the mid-1990s, the Czech Republic briefly came to prominence as a transit point for Chinese migrants being smuggled into Western Europe, but Hungary regained its popularity by the end of the 1990s. There was a brief spike in asylum seekers in the late 1990s.

== Demography and distribution ==
Most Chinese in the Czech Republic reside in Prague, though they are less concentrated than they were in the past; in 1993, only 7% of Chinese in the country lived elsewhere, but by 2000 that figure had grown to 41%. However, they remain more urbanised than any other immigrant group in the country. They come largely from Zhejiang, Beijing, and Shanghai, and men outnumber women by a ratio of three-to-two, according to unofficial surveys. In the late 1990s, there may have been as many as 9,000 Chinese in the country, including illegal migrants. However, December 2007 official figures from the Czech Statistical Office showed a total of just 4,986; this made Chinese the 10th-largest group of non-European Union foreigners.

== Community associations ==
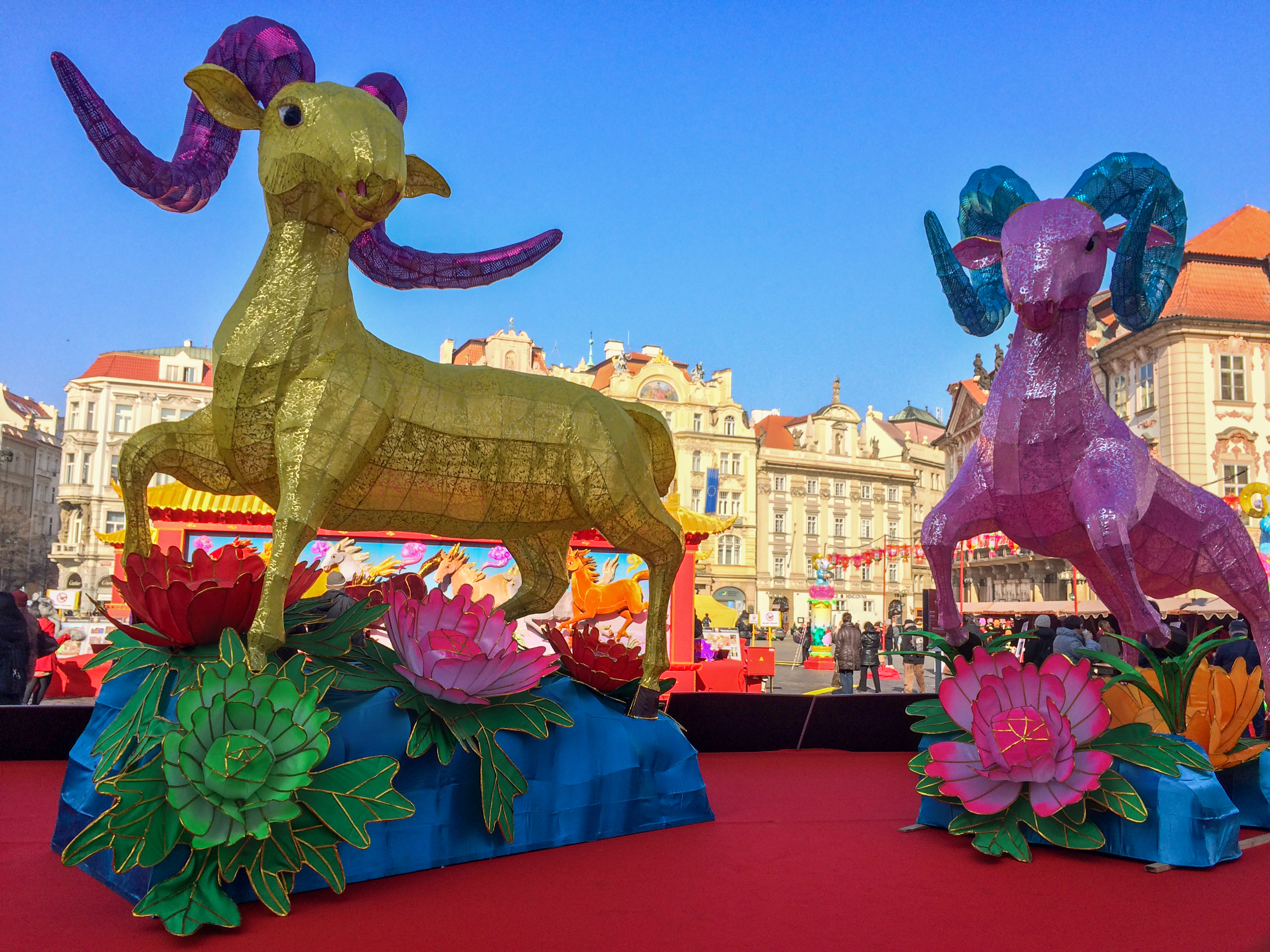
Chinese New Year celebration in Prague in 2015

One of the earliest Chinese community associations in the Czech Republic was the Association of Chinese Business in the Czech Republic (Ústřední sdružení čínských podnikatelů a obchodníků v ČR/捷克华人工商业者协会), referred to for short as the Shanghui (商会). It was founded by Mr. Li, a restaurateur from Shanghai who had previously lived in Hong Kong, Liberia, and Spain, and spoke fluent English. Though officially registered in 1995, in reality it had been operating already for several years. The organisation was plagued by scandal due to the influence of snakeheads and triads; one chairman of the Shanghui was assaulted and their offices trashed in 1995 over a commercial dispute, and many Chinese state that they were forced to join the Shanghui, pay protection fees in the guise of membership dues, and enter into price fixing schemes.

The backlash against the Shanghui resulted in the foundation of another association, the Hualianhui (华联会), by four women, an unusual development since most overseas Chinese associations tended to be founded and dominated by men. The first chairwoman, Ms. Weng, was an interpreter, language teacher, and author of Chinese cookery books, who had lived in the Czech Republic for over 40 years. As a direct result of the problems with Shanghui, they required recommendations from existing members and strictly screened new applicants in order to exclude problematic elements. Hualianhui was open to expatriates from Taiwan as well as China, which caused some tensions with the PRC embassy and made their situation in the Chinese community rather tenuous; however, in 2000, the new Chinese ambassador to the Czech Republic officially received Ms. Weng for a meeting at the embassy, and also made an appearance at their Chinese New Year celebration in 2001.

== See also ==
- China–Czech Republic relations
- Vietnamese people in the Czech Republic
- Koreans in the Czech Republic
