= Vietnamese people in the Czech Republic =

Ethnic group

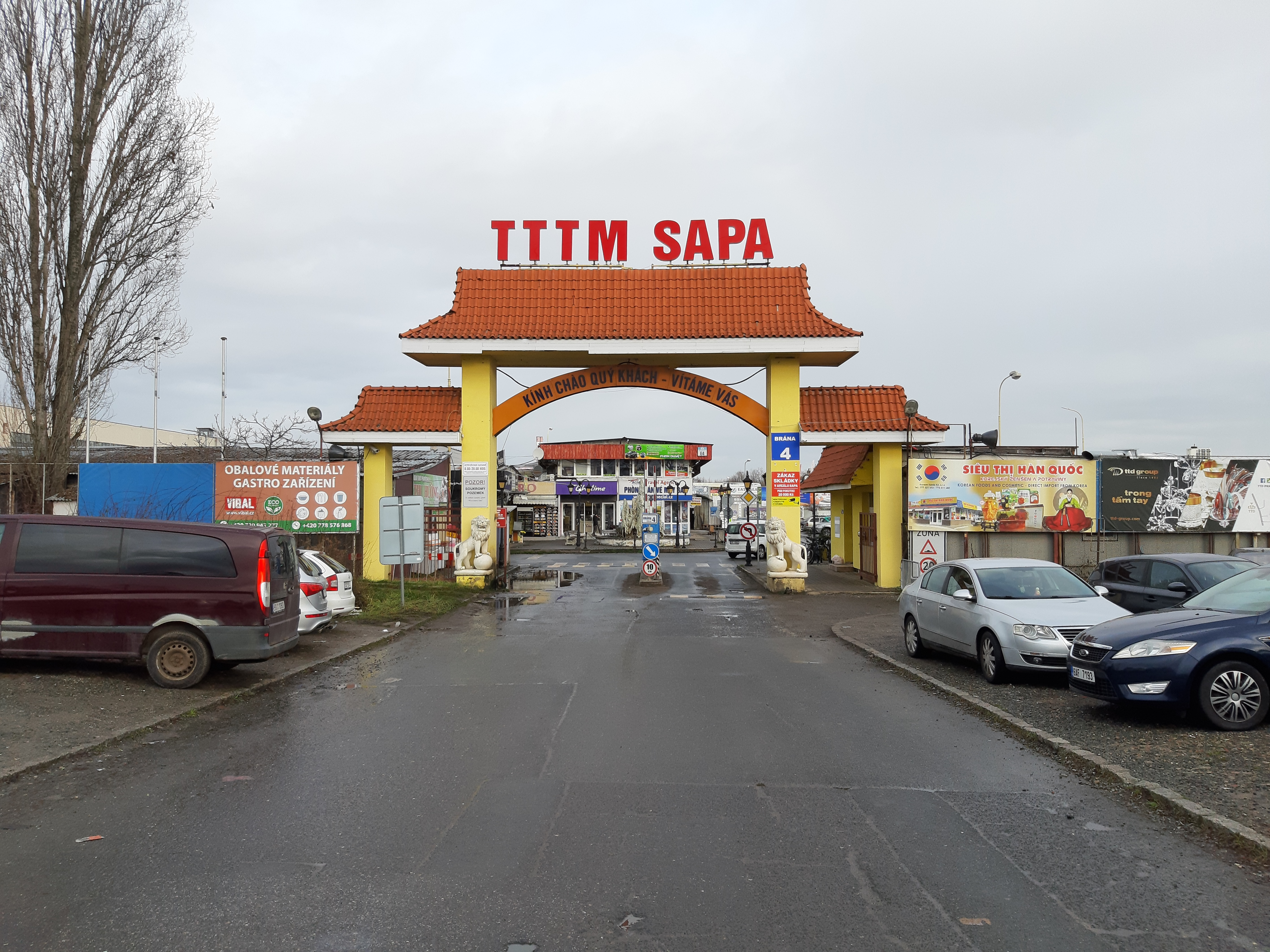
- TTTM Sapa, Prague

Total population
- c. 69,000 (Note: Including those with temporary residence.)

Regions with significant populations
- Prague, Cheb District

Languages
- Vietnamese, Czech

Religion
- Vietnamese folk religion, Mahayana Buddhism, Roman Catholicism, Protestantism

Vietnamese people in the Czech Republic, including citizens and non-citizens, are the third-largest ethnic minority in the country overall (after Slovaks and Ukrainians), and the largest Asian ethnic group, numbering more than 38,000 people according to the 2021 census.

It is the third-largest Vietnamese diaspora in Europe, after Germany and France, and one of the most populous Vietnamese diasporas of the world.

== Demographics ==
Vietnamese citizens legally residing in the Czech Republic as of 31 December (excluding Czech citizens of Vietnamese ethnicity)
Year	Pop.	±%
1994	9,633	—
2001	17,462	+81.3%
2004	34,179	+95.7%
2007	51,159	+49.7%
2009	61,178	+19.6%
2014	56,609	−7.5%
2017	59,808	+5.7%
2018	61,143	+2.2%
2019	61,952	+1.3%
2020	62,884	+1.5%
2021	64,851	+3.1%
2022	66,340	+2.3%
2023	67,783	+2.2%
2024	69,015	+1.8%

According to the 1991 census, there were 421 ethnic Vietnamese in the Czech Republic. According to the 2001 census, there were 17,462 ethnic Vietnamese in the Czech Republic. In the 2011 census, 29,660 people listed their ethnicity as Vietnamese. In the 2021 census, 31,469 people listed their ethnicity as Vietnamese, and 7,254 other people listed Vietnamese ethnicity as one of two their ethnicities (making it 38,723 people in total).

Nguyen, the most common Vietnamese surname, was the 9th most common surname in the Czech Republic in 2011, when 21,020 people with this surname were registered. (Note: However, the statistics are distorted by the fact that female and male forms of the same Czech surnames were counted separately, while the total number of Nguyens refers to both male and female bearers of the surname.)

The largest group of Vietnamese people (about 16,000, including those with temporary residence) lives in Prague. About 2,500–3,000 people are registered in each of the other largest cities in the Czech Republic – Brno, Ostrava and Plzeň. The main centre of the Vietnamese community is Cheb, with about 3,300 people.

== History ==
Vietnamese immigrants began settling in the Czech Republic during the communist period, when Vietnam, which sought to bolster its skilled workforce, sent students and guest workers to socialist Czechoslovakia for education and training. Following the collapse of communism in Czechoslovakia, a significant number have moved towards establishing their own businesses and integrating more broadly into society, similar to the experience of other overseas Vietnamese in Western countries. However, the small business sector remains the key economic domain of first-generation Vietnamese people in the Czech Republic.

== Status ==
In the Czech Republic, national minorities are afforded classic national minority rights, including government funding for the protection of their language and culture. In recent years, the Vietnamese community has sought recognition as a national minority. In 2004, however, the Government Council for National Minorities, the advisory body of the Czech Government on the issues of national minorities, concluded that the Vietnamese do not constitute a "national minority", as this term only applies to indigenous minorities who have inhabited the Czech territory for a long period of time. Eventually in 2013, a representative of the Vietnamese was accepted as a member of the Government Council for National Minorities, which in the absence of precise legal criteria, has been understood as an official recognition of the Vietnamese ethnic minority as a national minority by both authorities and the public. In Prague, which has the largest community of Vietnamese, a Vietnamese representative had been a member of the city's National Minority Council and Vietnamese had been included in Prague's policy for national minorities before this happened at the national level.

== Notable people ==
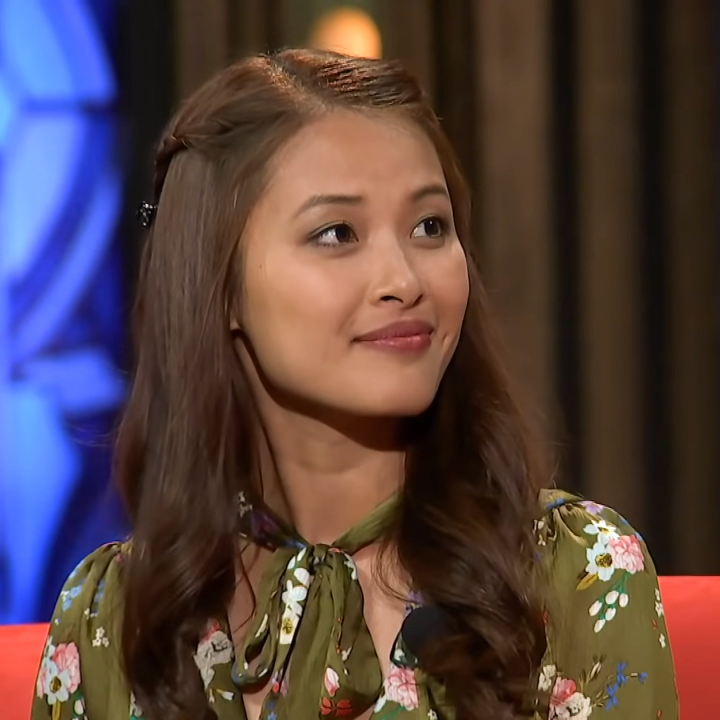
Ha Thanh Špetlíková

- Monika Leová (born 1991), TV presenter and model, Czech Miss 2013
- Filip Nguyen (born 1992), footballer
- Ha Thanh Špetlíková (born 1989), actress
- Diana Cam Van Nguyen (born 1993), animator and filmmaker
- Thai Dai Van Nguyen (born 2001), chess grandmaster

== See also ==
- Czech Republic–Vietnam relations
- Chinese people in the Czech Republic
- Sapa – Vietnamese marketplace in Prague
