= China–Czech Republic relations =

- Czech Republic: China

In 1919, official diplomatic relations were established between the Republic of China and Czechoslovakia. On 6 October 1949, the People's Republic of China (PRC) established relations with Czechoslovakia. In 1993, the Czech Republic was established and inherited the Czechoslovak treaty. The relations, trade and tourism between the PRC and the Czech Republic improved rapidly since the 1990s; and in the 2010s, agreements were made for more thorough economic improvements. Relations have deteriorated since 2018 as the Czech Republic has strengthened its ties with Taiwan.

== History ==
=== 1919–1939 ===
In 1919, the newly established Republic of Czechoslovakia was recognized by the Republic of China. At the Paris Peace conference in 1919, Czechoslovakia and China both voted for the Racial Equality Proposal.

On 10 September 1919, Lu Zhengxiang, a member of the Chinese delegation attending the Paris peace conference, wrote a letter to Milan Hodža, suggesting the play La voile du Bonheur, set in ancient China and written by the Sinophile French politician Georges Clemenceau be translated into Czech. Writing in French, Lu declared :"je crois qu'elle pourra aussi intéresser les lecteurs de votre pays". Czech scholars tended to be more interested in Chinese culture than the other way around. By contrast, Chinese scholars tended to be more interested in German culture with one scholar Yu Ta-wei saying of universities in the Weimar Republic: "there were scientists of the calibre of Albert Einstein, Max Plank and Ulrich von Willamowitz-Möllendorf teaching at German universities-what other country could boast intellectual resources of that calibre?" Only after a wave of assaults perpetuated by the SA in 1933 against Chinese university students studying in Germany did those Chinese wishing to study abroad began to consider universities outside of Germany. The low importance assigned by the Waichiaopu to relations with Prague was shown by the fact that Chinese minister in Warsaw was also the minister to Prague and rarely left Warsaw to meet Czechoslovak politicians. Following a corruption scandal in 1933 involving the Chinese minister in Warsaw, Chang Hsin-hai, whom it was discovered had accepted bribes to sign fake invoices for arms shipments from Czechoslovakia that actually went to Spanish Morocco instead of China, Liang Lone was appointed Chinese minister in Prague.

The appointment of a minister in Prague improved Czechoslovak-Chinese relations, and in the 1930s China began to purchase industrial equipment and arms to modernize China, especially its armed forces. At the time, Czechoslovakia had the world's 7th largest economy and Czechoslovakia had easily the modern developed and industrialized economy in Eastern Europe. The former Austrian provinces of Bohemia, Moravia and Silesia that now comprise the modern Czech republic had been the industrial heartland of the Austrian empire, where the majority of the arms for the Imperial Austrian Army were manufactured, most notably at the Škoda Works. One consequence of this legacy was that Czechoslovakia was only nation in Eastern Europe besides for the Soviet Union that manufactured its own weapons instead of importing them, and Czechoslovakia was the world's 7th largest manufacturer of arms, making Czechoslovakia into an important player in the global arms trade. China, which at the time had virtually no arms industry of its own, was keenly interested in importing arms from Czechoslovakia.

In the 1930s, China had 17 diplomatic missions in Europe with embassies established in Paris, London, Moscow, Berlin and Rome. By contrast, China maintained legations in Lisbon, Warsaw, Vienna and Prague as Portugal, Poland, Austria and Czechoslovakia, respectively, were considered only secondary powers. The fact that none of those nations where China maintained relations at a legation level had extraterritorial rights led the Chinese to attach some importance to relations with those states as it allowed them to show the rest of the world that extraterritorial rights were not necessary to have a good relationship with China. The Chinese diplomats in Europe in the 1930s formed a closely knit group of friends, all of whom had attended foreign universities to study international law and foreign languages, who met on a regular basis to discuss the problems of Europe and Asia. Liang often left Prague to go to Berlin, Paris, London and Geneva (where the headquarters of the League of Nations was located) to confer with his fellow Chinese diplomats. Additionally, various Chinese notables such as Madame Chen Suk-ying, the wife of Sun Fo, H. H. Kung and Wang Jingwei regularly visited Prague to see the renowned doctor Wilhelm Nonnenbruch, and would stop by the Chinese Legation. The American historian Liang Hsi-Huey, the son of the diplomat Liang Lone who served as the Chinese minister in Prague, wrote that Wang, one of the most charismatic men in China and the leader of the left wing of the Kuomintang until he became a Japanese collaborator in 1938, was "...so powerful an orator that after a patriotic speech he gave in our house over dinner, even our Czech servants in the kitchen felt moved, though they had not understood one word".

Liang wrote the differences between Czechoslovakia, a small, economically advanced, highly centralized state in Central Europe with its "disciplined democracy" vs. China, a large, populous and economically backward country whose "people were held together by traditions of loyalty to family and clan rather than through legal obligations to the state" led to very different approaches to international relations. The leaders of Czechoslovakia were obsessed with the fear that their country could be destroyed in a matter of days in a "cataclysmic war" while China "...had over the past 100 years surrendered piece after piece of its territorial sovereignty and still continued to exist". The principal aim of Czechoslovak diplomacy was to build a system of alliances which would deter a potential enemy, especially Germany, from invading while the principal aim of Chinese diplomacy was to secure foreign aid to allow China to modernize and end its treatment as a second class power by the Western nations and Japan. Liang wrote the elites in Czechoslovakia and China had very "different senses of time" with the Czechoslovak leaders thinking in terms of years while the Chinese thought in terms of decades. The virulent anti-Asian racism held by Adolf Hitler and the rest of the Nazi leaders were generally not considered a problem by the Chinese diplomats, who knew Germany was the main source of weapons for China and the military mission training the Chinese Army, which led them to ignore Nazi racism as much as possible. By contrast, the völkische concept of Slavs as untermensch ("subhumans") and Germans as Herrnvolk ("master race") led the Czechoslovak diplomats to see Nazi Germany as an existential and immediate threat.

In 1928, China purchased a hydroelectric power plant from Škoda and in 1933 the machinery for a sugar processing plant, likewise from Škoda. As part of the effort to diversify the sources of arms as the Chinese leader Chiang Kai-shek did not want to become overtly dependent upon Germany (the largest seller of weapons to China until 1938), Chinese officers regularly visited Czechoslovakia on arms buying missions from 1932 onward. In 1932, H. H. Kung, the Chinese Finance Minister, visited Czechoslovakia to inspect the armament factories in Plzeň and Brno. In an attempt to reduce the dependence on Germany as a source of weapons, Liang encouraged Chinese officers to visit Czechoslovakia to buy arms there. The younger Liang remembered when growing up in Prague that his father would take him on walks through Stromovka park talking about the geopolitical implications of changes in power in Eurasia.

The great prestige maintained by Edvard Beneš, who was considered one of the most ablest diplomats in Europe, was often noted by the Chinese. Beneš was a great believer in the League of Nations, arguing that all the nations of the world, regardless if they were great powers or small powers should be treated equally, a message that appealed to Chinese diplomats who were struggling to end the "Unequal Treaties" that gave the citizens of the European great powers extraterritorial rights in China. Beneš's message that all of the nations of the world should band together under the League to resist aggression also had appeal to Chinese diplomats after Japan seized Manchuria in 1931. In practice, however, Beneš who saw the principle of collective security under the banner of League as a way of getting the great powers to defend Czechoslovakia, regarded collective security as only applying to Europe, not Asia. Beneš felt that applying the principle of collective security to the defense of China against Japanese aggression would distract the attention of the great powers from Europe, leaving Czechoslovakia open to German aggression. Czechoslovakia's support for China during the Mukden incident was mostly rhetorical as Beneš deplored the Japanese aggression against China without doing anything more. On the other hand, the fact that Germany was the largest source of arms for China together with the fact that a German military mission was training the National Revolutionary Army led the Chinese government to support the German viewpoint on the Sudetenland until June 1938 when the Reich ceased arm sales to China and withdrew the German military mission. After Germany switched from supporting China to supporting Japan in June 1938, Chinese attitudes towards Czechoslovakia became more favorable. Li Ban, a Chinese officer serving with the Wehrmacht transferred over to the Czechoslovak Army in July 1938, becoming the one and only Asian in the entire Czechoslovak Army. Li left the Wehrmacht out of disgust with Germany's support for Japan, and declared that he would fight with Czechoslovakia if the Reich should invade.

The younger Liang wrote about his father's time as minister in Prague: "...I like to think that the six happy years that Liang Lone-and indeed our whole family-spent in Prague between 1933 and 1939 made for a rapprochement between China and Czechoslovakia that was good for both countries. I cannot speak for Czechoslovakia, but I think I can speak of a growing appreciation for the democratic ideas of President Masaryk and President Beneš on the Chinese side. My father respected Beneš, and ten years later, when I was already a student and Beneš had just died, he spoke to me with affection of his meetings with Czechoslovakia's long-time foreign minister and second president". In a book published in German in Prague in 1938 entitled China muss siegen (China must win), the elder Liang wrote about the process of persecution done in the name of Gleichschaltung (coordination) "such as we see being done in certain undemocratic countries". However, Liang fils wrote about the political attitudes of Liang pere: "...I do not believe that my father shared quite the same abhorrence that Thomas Masaryk and Edvard Beneš felt for Nazi Germany. Like so many Kuomintang politicians of his generation, Liang was still a Confucian at heart, a believer in China's ancient culture, always more inclined to compromise with a Chinese warlord than to become involved with a foreign government. Beneš by contrast, gave high priority to good relations with neighboring countries, hoping that peace would give the minorities in his small republic the time and confidence to join together in one national community".

=== 1939-1949 ===
Following student protests in October–November 1939 at Charles University against the occupation, the Reichsprotektor Baron Konstantin von Neurath closed all Czech language universities in the Protectorate of Bohemia and Moravia. One of the few Czech language higher education institutions not affected by Neurath's order was the Orient Institute in Prague that had been founded in 1922 to promote knowledge about Asia. The Orient Institution offered evening courses on learning Mandarin and on aspects of Chinese culture that became popular with a number of younger Czechs who saw attending the courses as a form of "spiritual resistance", to show that the younger Czechs still hungered for knowledge and learning despite the claims of the occupiers that they did not. Nazi propaganda tended to present the Czechs as a "dumb" people fit only for menial labor, and thus hearing Jaroslav Průšek of the Orient Institute lecture about Chinese philosophy and poetry was seen by the young Czechs as a way of rejecting the role assigned to them by the Nazis. The fact that Průšek twice turned down chances to teach at German universities during the war added to his appeal.

Průšek's wartime translations of Chinese poetry, which also featured introductory essays offered up a highly romantic picture of China as a land whose values were informed by the ancient Confucian philosophy that placed personal morality and decency above all else, which was highly appealing message in the protectorate. In his very popular 1940 book Sestra moje Čina (My Sister China), Průšek recounted his travels in China in 1932–1934. In Sestra moje Čina, Průšek portrayed the Chinese as a people wanting to embrace modernity, but not willing to give up their ancient heritage, which many Czechs saw as analogous to their own situation. Most notably, Průšek portrayed Confucinism as a humanistic philosophy that rejected violence, noting that in China soldiers had a low status while intellectuals had a high status, which was understood at the time as an implied criticism of the occupiers.

In late 1945, a department of Far Eastern Philology and History was established at Charles University and in 1947 Průšek became its first full-time professor. In 1946, Liang returned to Prague with the new title of ambassador. Liang donated a large number of Chinese books to Charles University while sponsoring two art shows in Prague featuring Chinese art. The Velvet coup of February 1948 did not initially change relations and Liang remained in Prague as the ambassador of the Republic of China. However, the Communist Xinhua News Agency opened one of its European offices in Prague in the fall of 1948. On 1 October 1949, the Communist government broke off relations with the Republic of China and recognized the People's Republic of China.

=== 1949–1988 ===
People's Republic of China–Czech Republic relations began on 6 October 1949 when the Czech Republic was a federal element of Czechoslovakia. Czechoslovakia was one of the first nations to recognize the new People's Republic and became the third largest trade partner of China in the 1950s, being exceeded only by the Soviet Union and East Germany. In 1953, two film-makers from Czechoslovakia, Vladimír Sís and his cameraman Josef Vaniš, were sent to Tibet to film a documentary on construction of a highway linking Tibet to the Chinese province of Sichuan. The resulting documentary, Cesta vede do Tibetu (The Road Leads to Tibet) captured many aspects of traditional Tibetan culture together with the Tibetan Buddhist monasteries that were destroyed during the Cultural Revolution. Charles University in Prague where professor Jaroslav Průšek taught became a center of Sinology in Eastern Europe in the 1950s-1960s. A major part of Czechoslovak Sinology from the early 1950s onward was to translate various works of Chinese literature into Czech and Slovak, which was part of the Communist "service to the people" ideology, but also reflected public interest in the subject. In September–October 1959, the First Secretary of the Czechoslovak Communist Party, Antonín Novotný, paid a lengthy visit to China to take part in the celebrations of the 10th anniversary of the founding of the People's Republic. In 1960, during the Sino-Soviet split, Czechoslovakia in common with the other Soviet satellite states sided with the Soviet Union.

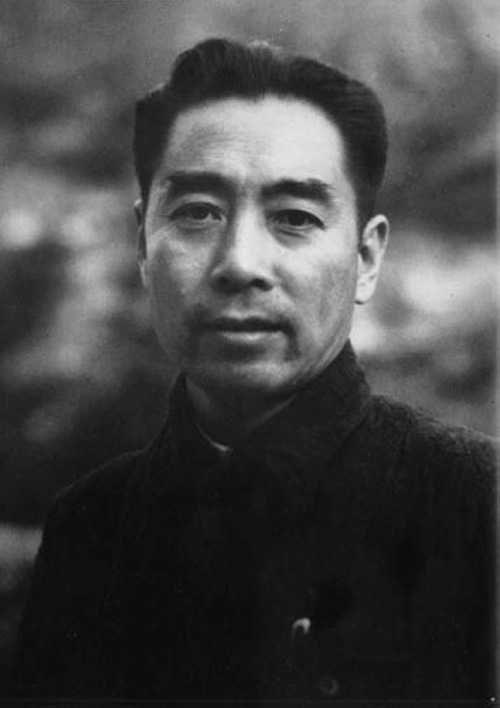
Chinese Premier and Foreign Minister Zhou Enlai vehemently condemned the 1968 Soviet invasion of Czechoslovakia

The Cultural Revolution in China, which was launched by Chairman of the Chinese Communist Party Mao Zedong in 1966, led to the Czechoslovak embassy in Beijing together with the Soviet and East German embassies being attacked by the Red Guard in 1967. The Red Guard were very xenophobic and were inclined to violent harassment of any foreigner in China, and moreover did not respect diplomatic immunity, which was most dramatically illustrated by the sack and burning of the British embassy in Beijing in August 1967. Czechoslovak diplomats found China during the Cultural Revolution to be a very trying and difficult posting. In 1967 Czechoslovakia banned all Chinese university students from studying in Czechoslovakia following complaints that there were trying to export the Cultural Revolution to Czechoslovakia. On 27 July 1967, a formal note against the student ban was issued, which declared Beijing's fury at "the Czech revisionist group" having "publicly attacked Mao Zedong, the red sun in the hearts of the revolutionary people of the world".

In 1968, China vehemently condemned the Soviet invasion of Czechoslovakia. On 23 August 1968, the Premier and Foreign Minister Zhou Enlai gave a speech at the Romanian Embassy in Beijing, accusing the Soviet Union of "Fascist politics, great power chauvinism, national egoism, and social-imperialism." Zhou compared the invasion of Czechoslovakia in 1968 with Hitler's policies towards Czechoslovakia in 1938–39 and with American policies in Vietnam. In his speech, Zhou came very close towards urging the Czechs and Slovaks to wage a guerrilla war against the Red Army. Though the Chinese had been opposed to the "Prague Spring" policies of Alexander Dubček, who was accused of being a "revisionist", Mao Zedong was completely opposed to the so-called "Brezhnev Doctrine" under which the Soviet Union gave itself the right to intervene if a Communist country was deviating from Communism as defined by the Soviet Union, which he felt might be applied against himself.

After the Soviet invasion, the principle criticism made of Dubček by the Chinese media was that he had "capitulated" instead of waging a guerrilla war as Mao wanted him to do. The fact that the Chinese had condemned Dubček for initiating the Prague Spring reforms intended to create "socialism with a human face" presented some difficulties for Chinese propaganda after the Soviet invasion. As a result, Chinese propaganda tended to focus on the abstract right of peoples to develop socialism as they saw fit for their own nations instead of the particular policies pursued by Dubček. In this regard, Dubček was condemned by the Chinese media for copying the "revisionism" already practiced in the Soviet Union, whom according to the Chinese media had been deviating from proper Communism ever since the death of Stalin in 1953. The Chinese media maintained that it was correct to speak of a "socialist commonwealth" during Stalin's lifetime, but after his death, China under Mao had been remained faithful towards true communism while the Soviet Union and all of the Eastern European states except for Albania had deviated away from proper communism. At various times, the Chinese media compared the Soviet concept of a "Socialist Commonwealth" in Eastern Europe to the Japanese "Greater East Asia Co-Prosperity Sphere", the Nazi "New Order in Europe", and the American "Free World Community". On 26 August and 5 September 1968, the Chinese formally submitted diplomatic of protest against the treatment of Chinese diplomats in Prague by Soviet forces. Relations between Prague and Beijing remained cold until 1987 when the Chinese Prime Minister Zhao Ziyang visited Czechoslovakia on an official visit.

By the early 1970s, it became common to speak of a "Prague School" of Sinology as Průšek and his students became regarded as the leading experts on Chinese literature. Průšek argued that the May 4th movement of 1919, which is generally regarded as the beginning of modern China, was not just a reaction to Western policies, but was also a movement with deep roots in traditional Chinese values. This was a novel thesis as generally the May 4th movement, was seen as a break with the Chinese past and an attempt to embrace Westernization to end China's backwardness.

=== 1989–present ===
The Czech Republic became an independent country on 1 January 1993, the Chinese government extended diplomatic relations. At the dissolution of Czechoslovakia in 1993, government officials from both sides signed and exchanged notes recognizing the treaties and agreements signed between China and the former Czechoslovakia Federal Republic continues to be upheld and binding. Sino-Czech relations were strained under the presidency of Václav Havel who was highly supportive of Chinese dissidents and was a friend of the Dalai Lama.

The bilateral relationship sunk to a low in 1995 as the Czech Republic allowed Lien Chan and other Taiwanese government officials to have a state visit in their country. The Czech Republic also openly supported Two-Chinas and Taiwan's re-entry in the United Nations. In early 1996, relationship between the two countries improved as the Czech Republic under Václav Klaus reaffirmed its One China policy.

Miloš Zeman, who served as prime minister of the Czech Republic from 1998 to 2002 and serves as the president since 2013, tried to forge close ties to China. The Czech political representation opened itself up to the Chinese government in 2013–14 for "economic diplomacy". By 2019, this rapprochement has had mixed results including several economic and political controversies.

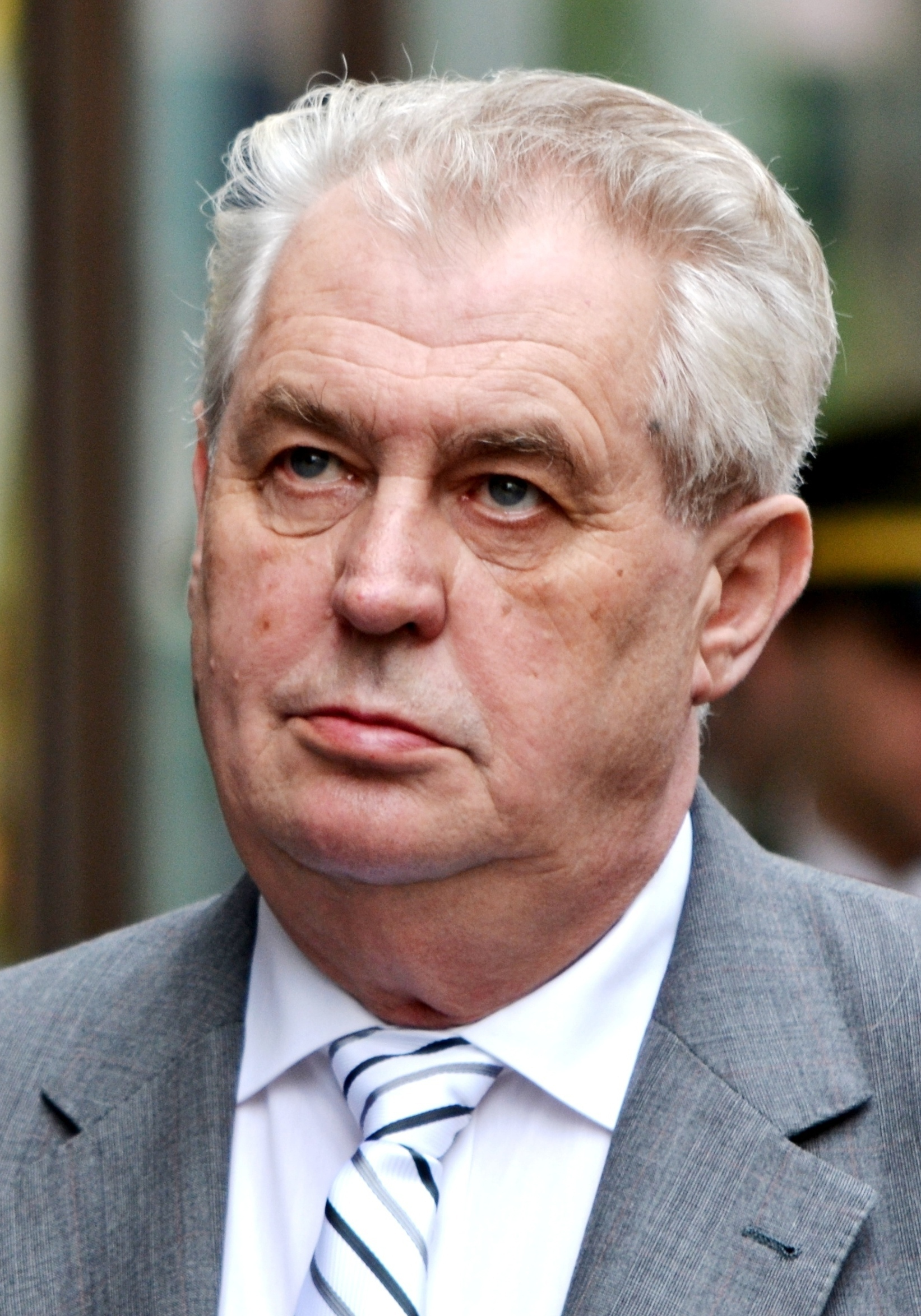
Miloš Zeman is known for his positive attitude towards China

On 20 May 2009, China and Czech Republic celebrated sixty years of diplomatic relations. Chinese premier Wen Jiabao met with Czech President Václav Klaus and the then Czech Prime Minister Jan Fischer for talks on improving bilateral trade, environment protection and build mutual trust.

According to a Czech Republic's counter-intelligence agency Security Information Service (BIS) 2014 report, "China’s administration and its intelligence services have put an emphasis on gaining influence over Czech political and state structures and on gathering political intelligence, with active participation by select Czech elites, including politicians and state officials."

In October 2014, Czech president Miloš Zeman met his Chinese leader Xi Jinping in Beijing. Xi expressed he will strive new restart in bilateral relations and Zeman addressed topics on improving business and tourism between the two countries. Zeman also proposed direct flight connection between Prague and Shanghai, and establishing new Czech consulate in Chengdu, Sichuan. Later Zeman also met representatives of Bank of China and Chinese Premier Li Keqiang.

Czech Republic joined the Belt and Road Initiative in 2015.

In 2016, the two countries signed the Sino-Czech agreement for Chinese investment in the Czech Republic.

Xi Jinping visited the Czech Republic from 28 to 30 March 2016, at the invitation of president Zeman. It was the first visit by a General Secretary of the Chinese Communist Party to the Czech Republic, demonstrating the improving relations between the two countries. A strategic partnership agreement between the two countries was signed by the presidents.

In 2018 relations were damaged when the Czech cyber-security watchdog warned of the risks associated with purchasing telecom equipment from Chinese companies such as Huawei and ZTE.

According to the Jamestown Foundation, since 2018, China has engaged in disinformation and influence operations against the Czech Republic and targets within the Czech Republic.

Zeman's fifth visit to China took place in April 2019. Talks between Xi and Zeman were largely concerning trade, investment and economic relations. That year, the city of Prague, twinned with Beijing, declared support for Tibet. The decision angered Beijing, which then terminated the agreement; Prague in turn took up with Taipei.

In January 2020 the Chinese ambassador sent a letter to the Czech President protesting the impending trip to Taiwan of Jaroslav Kubera, Speaker of the Senate, as a violation of the one China policy. The futures of Škoda, the Home Credit Group and Klaviry Petrof were threatened if the visit went forward. The visit never took place due to Kubera's death. In March 2020 Czech Prime Minister Andrej Babiš demanded China replace its ambassador for the threatening letter.

In August 2020, Miloš Vystrčil, president of the Senate of the Czech Republic, led a 90-member delegation to Taiwan. In response, China's Foreign Ministry spokesman called it a "despicable act" and a Chinese diplomat threatened that Vystrčil would "pay a heavy price".

In June 2021, the Czech Senate unanimously passed a motion condemning China's human rights abuses against the Uyghurs as both genocide and crimes against humanity.

In 2021, Czech Minister of Foreign Affairs Jan Lipavský was targeted in a Chinese cyberespionage campaign by the Ministry of State Security's APT31 group. In response, Lipavský stated "[t]his just proves the assessment in our Security Strategy, which states that the rising assertiveness of China is a systemic challenge that needs to be dealt with in coordination with our trans-Atlantic allies."

In March 2024, during a visit by Taiwanese vice-president Hsiao Bi-khim to Prague, Chinese diplomats attempted to stage a car collision to "demonstratively confront" Hsiao, according Czech Military Intelligence.

In May 2025, the Czech Ministry of Foreign Affairs stated that its communication system was targeted by APT31, saying that "[s]uch behavior undermines the credibility of the People’s Republic of China and contradicts its public declarations." The European Union and NATO expressed solidarity with the Czech Republic, condemning the cyberattack as a violation of international norms and urging China to prevent such malicious activities. In August 2025, China announced that it suspended all ties with Petr Pavel after he met with the 14th Dalai Lama. In January 2026, Czech authorities arrested the Prague correspondent for Guangming Daily on suspicion of espionage. The Chinese national had been under investigation for two years for attempting to gathering kompromat to blackmail Czech politicians. In April 2026, China banned the export of dual use items to four Czech companies, including Excalibur Army, citing the country's past arms sales to Taiwan.

== Trade ==
The economic relations between the countries stood at US$340 million in 1993 when the Czech Republic became an independent state. Over the years, the bilateral trade has increased. In 2001, the trade volume between the two countries was US$615 million.

In 2007, bilateral trade between China and the Czech Republic stood at $9.9 billion. This has increased to 61.9 percent year on year basis. In the same year, Chinese exports to the Czech Republic was $9.2 billion in 2007. China's imports from the Czech Republic totaled $700 million in 2006.

In 2016, Czech export to China was US$1.921 billion (1.19% of total Czech exports) and Chinese export to the Czech Republic was US$17.770 billion (12.66% of total Czech imports).

In 2018, Czech Cyber and Information Security Agency (NUKIB) issued a warning to the Czech National Security Authority that usage of Chinese telecommunications company Huawei's software and hardware equipment posed a security risk. In July 2019, two Czech former employees of Huawei claimed that they were required to collect the personal data of clients including their family information, personal interests and financial situations, which was then entered into Huawei's central databases in China. This information would also be shared with Chinese embassy officials in Czech.

In 2020 during the COVID-19 pandemic, the Czech Republic imported 150,000 test kits from China at a cost of US$546,000. Some medias outlets claimed that 80% of these were found to be faulty.

== Diplomatic missions ==
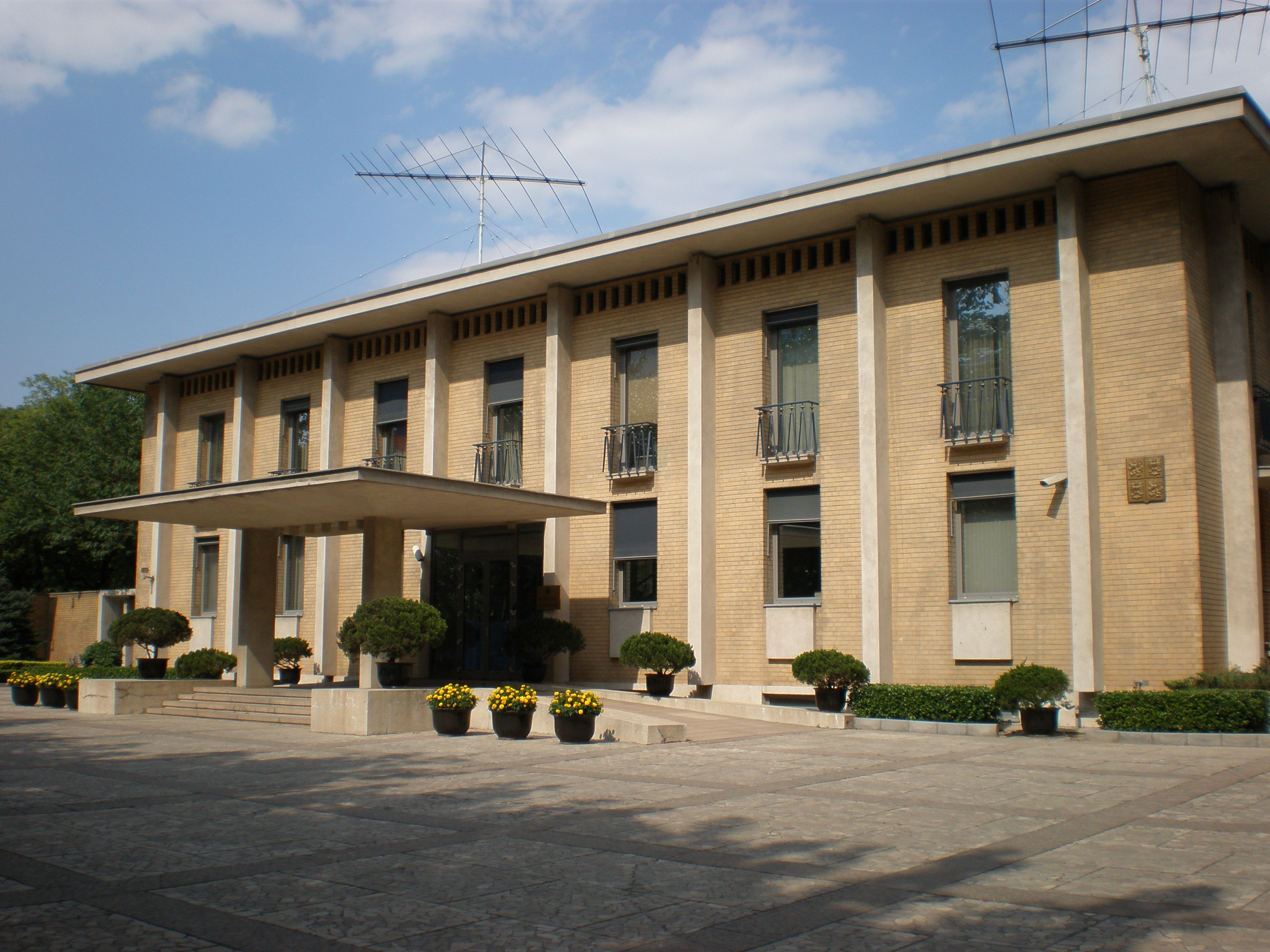
Embassy of the Czech Republic in China

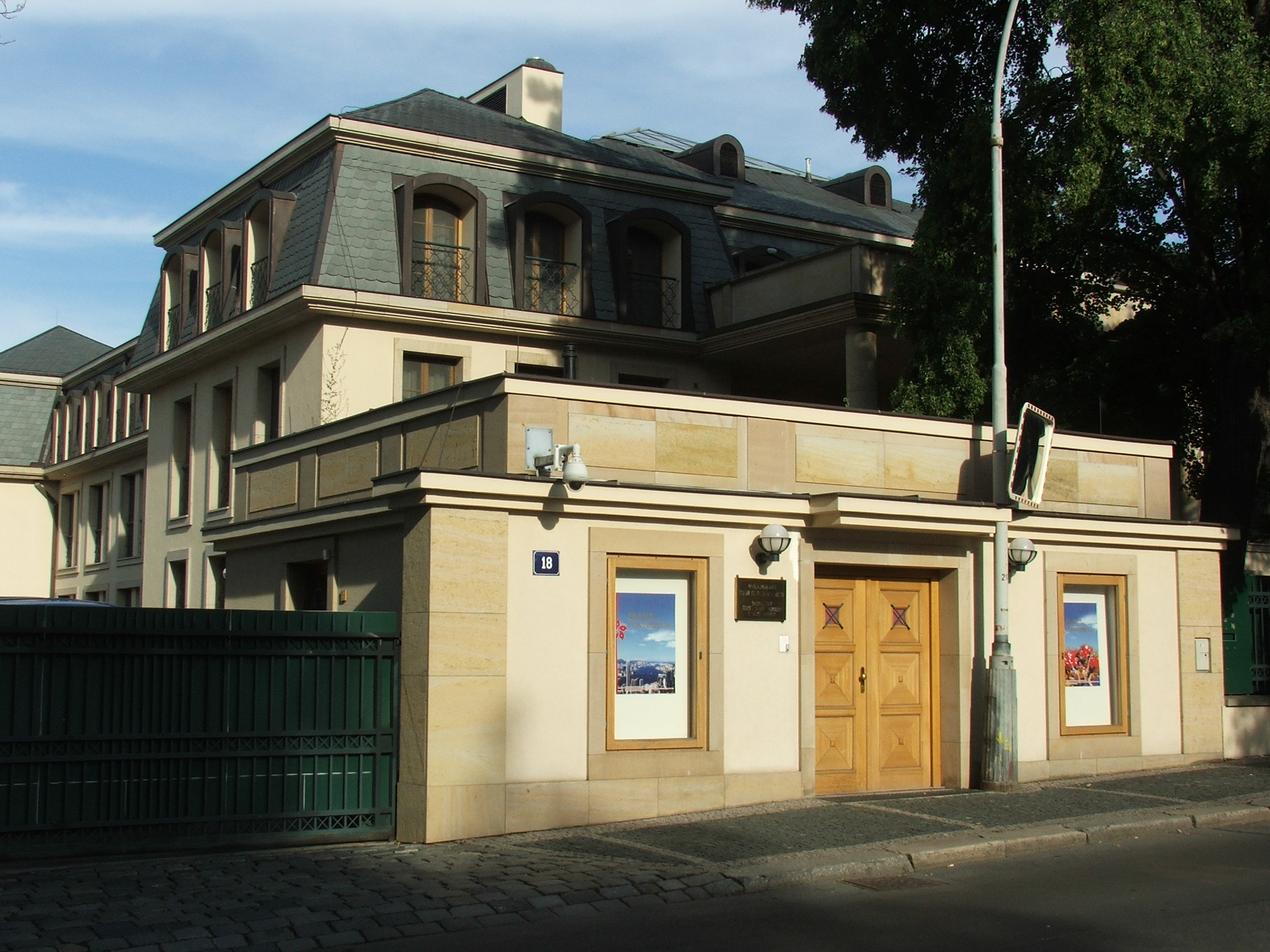
Embassy of China in the Czech Republic

- Chinese embassy in Prague
- Czech embassy in Beijing, consulate-general in Chengdu, Shanghai and Hong Kong

== See also ==
- China–European Union relations
- Chinese people in the Czech Republic
- Czech Republic–Taiwan relations
- Foreign relations of China
- Foreign relations of the Czech Republic
- List of diplomatic missions of China
- List of diplomatic missions of the Czech Republic
