= United Kingdom–Vietnam relations =

- United Kingdom: Vietnam

United Kingdom–Vietnam relations (Vietnamese: Quan hệ Vương quốc Anh – Việt Nam) encompass the diplomatic, economic, and historical interactions between the United Kingdom of Great Britain and Northern Ireland and the Socialist Republic of Vietnam. They established diplomatic relations on 11 September 1973, 3 years prior to Vietnamese reunification.

The United Kingdom and Vietnam on a map.

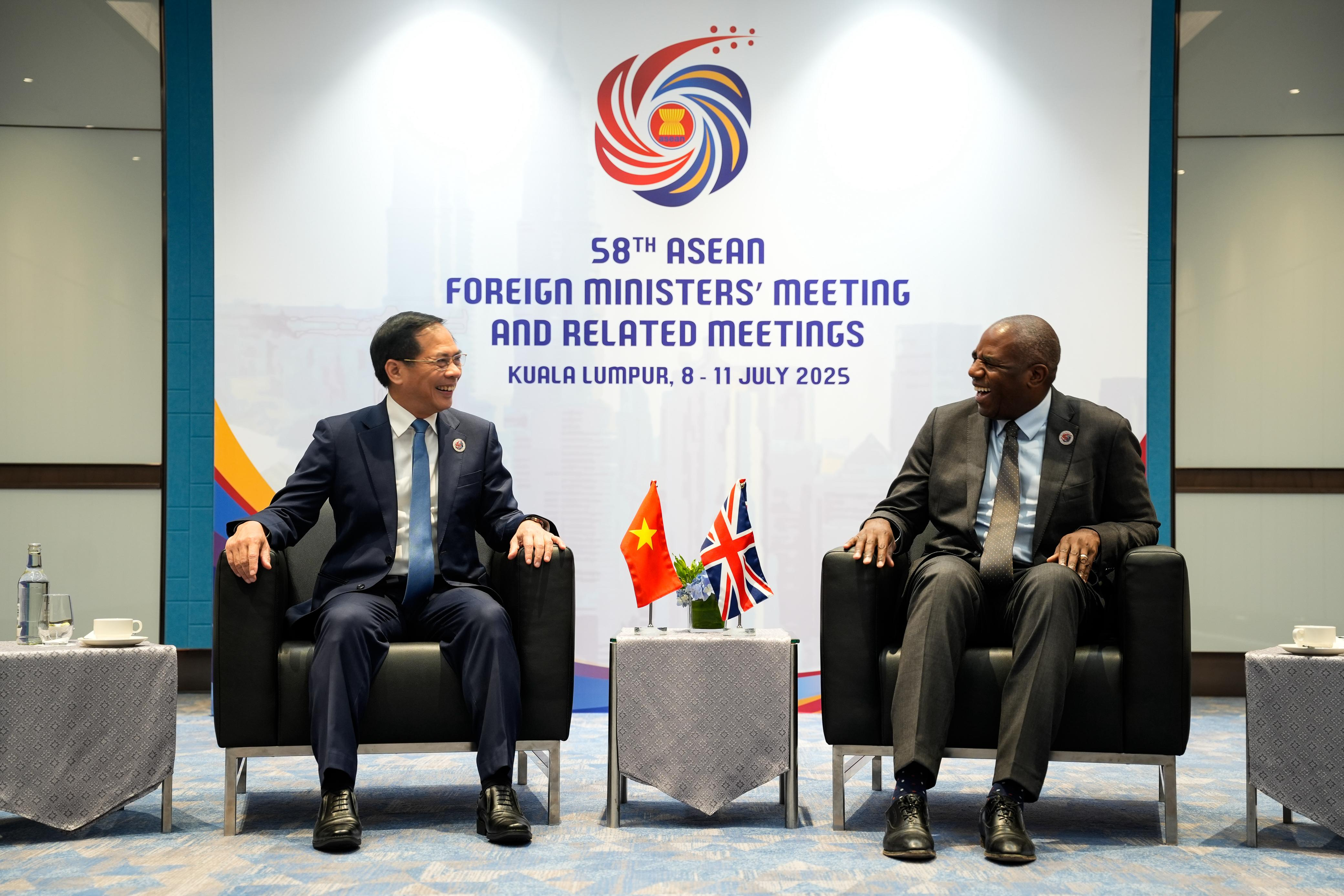
Vietnamese Foreign Minister Bùi Thanh Sơn with British Foreign Secretary David Lammy in Kuala Lumpur, July 2025.

Both countries share common membership of CPTPP, and the World Trade Organization. Bilaterally the two countries have a Double Taxation Agreement, a Free Trade Agreement, an Investment Agreement, and a Strategic Partnership.

== Economic relations ==
The UK and Vietnam entered into a strategic partnership agreement, to boost bilateral ties, in 2010.

From 1 August 2020 until 30 December 2020, trade between Vietnam and the UK was governed by the European Union–Vietnam Free Trade Agreement, while the United Kingdom was a member of the European Union.

Following the withdrawal of the United Kingdom from the European Union, the UK and Vietnam signed the United Kingdom–Vietnam Free Trade Agreement on 14 March 2019. The United Kingdom–Vietnam Free Trade Agreement is a continuity trade agreement, based on the EU free trade agreement, which entered into force on 1 January 2021. Trade value between Vietnam and the United Kingdom was worth £7,049 million in 2022.

In July 2023, the United Kingdom signed the agreement to accede to the Comprehensive and Progressive Agreement for Trans-Pacific Partnership, a trade bloc of which Vietnam is a founding member. CPTPP covered UK–Vietnam trade from 15 December 2024.

== Diplomatic missions ==
- Vietnam maintains an embassy in London.
- The UK is accredited to Vietnam through its embassy in Hanoi, and a Consulate General in Ho Chi Minh City.

=== Vietnamese Ambassadors to the United Kingdom ===
South Vietnam Ambassadors to the United Kingdom

1. Nguyễn Khắc Vệ (1952–1955, Minister)
2. Nguyễn Khắc Bằng (1955–1956, Chargé d'affaires)
3. Ngô Đình Luyện (1956–1963)
4. Trương Bửu Khánh (1963–1964, Chargé d'affaires)
5. Vũ Văn Mẫu (1964–1965)
6. Nguyễn Văn An (1965–1967, Chargé d'affaires)
7. Lê Ngọc Chấn (1967–1972)
8. Vương Văn Bắc (1972–1973)
9. Lê Thành Khê (1973–1974, Chargé d'affaires)
10. Phạm Đăng Lâm (1974–1975, until the Fall of Saigon)

== See also ==
- Accession of the United Kingdom to CPTPP
- Comprehensive and Progressive Agreement for Trans-Pacific Partnership
- Free trade agreements of the United Kingdom
- Free trade agreements of Vietnam
- Foreign relations of the United Kingdom
- Foreign relations of Vietnam
- Vietnamese people in the United Kingdom
