= Free trade agreements of Vietnam =

Vietnam's international economic relations

Vietnam, although a relatively young nation, has successfully established trade relations with dozens of countries worldwide. This is especially evident in the number of free trade agreements (FTAs) that the country has signed and is participating in. Being part of the Association of Southeast Asian Nations (ASEAN), economic opportunities for Vietnam expands beyond bilateral trade agreements, with specific countries in order to include multilateral trade agreements via the ASEAN Free Trade Area (AFTA).

== Bilateral free trade agreements ==
Below is a list of all the bilateral trade agreements Vietnam is currently participating in, organized by the partnering country.

- Chile: Vietnam-Chile Free Trade Agreement, signed 12 November, 2011; came into effect on 4 February, 2014.
- Cuba: Vietnam–Cuba Free Trade Agreement, signed 9 November 2018; came into effect on 1 April, 2020.
- Japan: Vietnam-–Japan Economic Partnership Agreement (VJEPA), signed 25 December, 2008; came into effect on 1 October, 2009.
- South Korea: Vietnam–Korea Free Trade Agreement (VKFTA), signed 5 May, 2015; came into effect on 20 December, 2015.
- United Kingdom: United Kingdom–Vietnam Free Trade Agreement (UKVFTA), signed 29 December, 2020; came into effect on 1 May, 2021.
- US: US–Vietnam Bilateral Trade Agreement (BTA), signed 14 July, 2000; came into effect on 10 December, 2001.

== Multilateral free trade agreements ==
Below is a list of all the multilateral trade agreements Vietnam is currently participating in, organized by partnering country/economic bloc.

- Association of Southeast Asian Nations (ASEAN): ASEAN Free Trade Area, signed 28 January, 1992; Vietnam joined ASEAN in 1995.
- Australia & New Zealand under ASEAN: ASEAN–Australia–New Zealand Free Trade Area, signed 27 February, 2009; came into effect on 1 January, 2010.
- China under ASEAN: ASEAN–China Free Trade Area (ACFTA), signed 4 November, 2002; came into effect on 1 July, 2003.
- Comprehensive and Progressive Agreement for Trans-Pacific Partnership (CPTPP) (including Australia, Brunei, Canada, Chile, Japan, Malaysia, Mexico, New Zealand, Peru, Singapore, and Vietnam, signed 8 March, 2018; came into effect on 30 December, 2018.
- Eurasian Economic Union: Vietnam–Eurasian Economic Union Free Trade Agreement (VN-EAEU FTA), signed 29 May, 2015; came into effect on 5 October, 2016.
- European Union (EU): EU–Vietnam Free Trade Agreement, signed 30 June, 2019; came into effect on 1 August, 2020.
- India under ASEAN: ASEAN–India Free Trade Area, signed 13 August, 2009; came into effect on 1 January, 2010.
- Regional Comprehensive Economic Partnership (RCEP) (including Australia, Brunei, Cambodia, China, Indonesia, Japan, South Korea, Laos, Malaysia, Myanmar, New Zealand, the Philippines, Singapore, Thailand, and Vietnam), signed 15 November, 2020; came into effect on 1 January, 2022.
