= EU Gateway Programme =

Defunct European Union economic initiative

EU Gateway | Business Avenues
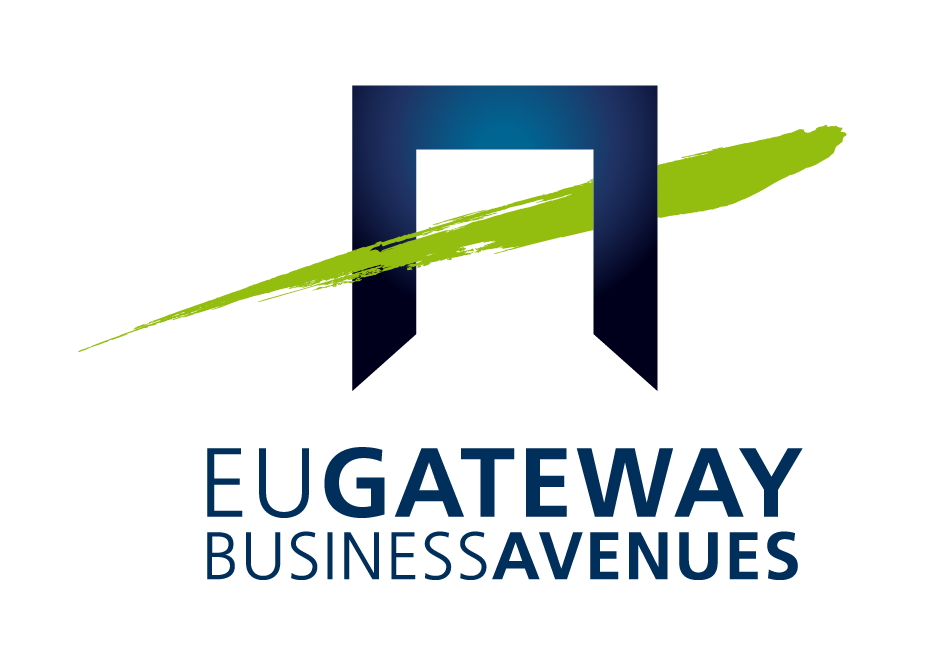

Initiative overview
- Motto: Helping European companies to establish long-lasting business collaborations in Asia
- Website: https://www.eu-gateway.eu

The EU Gateway Programme was an initiative funded by the European Union (EU), created and managed by the Service for Foreign Policy Instruments under the Partnership Instrument. The Programme was launched in 1990 to deepen economic interaction and cooperation between Europe and Japan. After the first successful editions, the Programme expanded into the Republic of Korea, South East Asia and China. For 30 years, until 2020, it acted as a bridgehead to support European companies developing and consolidating their businesses in Asia.

== History and legacy ==
The European Commission has always encouraged European enterprises' efforts to penetrate the Japanese market through business support programmes.

In 1990, the pilot EU Gateway Programme was created, pursuing the European and Japanese commitment to ensure equitable access to their markets. In July 1991, the European Community member states and Japan, agreed to "pursuing their resolve for equitable access to their respective markets and removing obstacles whether structural or other, impeding the expansion of trade and investment, on the basis of comparable opportunities" through the Joint Declaration that was signed. As a result, combined efforts started to be made for rejecting protectionism, removing market barriers, implementing the General Agreement on Tariffs and Trade and OECD principles concerning trade and investment. In addition, the basis for an intensive interaction in areas such as industrial co-operation, advanced technology, energy, employment, social affairs and competition rules were set. In the light of this diplomatic development, the EU Gateway Programme gained support and built a solid reputation both on the European and Japanese markets.

The democratic and economic drive of the Korean society started in 1992 after the election of Kim Young-sam, the first South Korean President with a civilian background. In 1995, the European Union launched the negotiations for a Framework Agreement (FA) on Trade and Cooperation with the Republic of Korea. In April 2001, the Framework Agreement entered into force committing both parties to foster bilateral trade and investment.

Between 1990 and 2001, 36 EU-funded business missions were organised by EU Gateway with nearly 1,400 European SME participants. From 2002 to 2007, the Programme organised 30 new EU-funded business missions with close to 1,000 participating companies.

In 2007, the Free Trade Agreement (FTA) negotiations between EU and the Republic of Korea started, entering into force in July 2011.

The EU Gateway Programme to the Republic of Korea was launched in 2008 during the FTA consultations aiming to accompany the implementation of the agreement along the way, marking a new era in EU Gateway history. In 2014, the EU Gateway Programme reached 24 years of history in Japan and 6 years of presence in the Republic of Korea.

All in all, from 2008 to 2014 more than 1,500 companies participated in 31 EU-funded business missions to Japan and 15 EU-funded business missions to the Republic of Korea respectively.

Between 2014 – 2015, three business missions to Singapore, Malaysia and Vietnam were organised, under the new pilot EU Business Avenues in South East Asia. 120 European companies participated to the first 3 EU-funded business missions to South East Asia.

From 2016 to 2020 the initiative was rebranded EU Gateway | Business Avenues^{[8]} following the successful implementation of the pilot in South East Asia. More than 2,200 from all EU member states participated to 53 EU-funded business missions to the Republic of Korea, Singapore, Indonesia, Malaysia, Thailand, Vietnam, the Philippines, Japan, and China, encouraging the establishment of long-lasting business collaborations with local companies. This last edition of the EU Gateway Programme focused on nine sectors: Green Energy Technologies, Environment & Water Technologies, Clean Technologies, Healthcare & Medical Technologies, Information & Communication Technologies, Construction & Building Technologies, Railway Technologies & Services, Organic Food & Beverage, and Contemporary European Design.

EU Gateway was instrumental to foster EU bilateral trade relations. The Programme closely followed and leveraged trade connections between the EU and the Asian target markets. With the EU-Republic of Korea Trade Agreement in place since 2011, the EU-Japan Economic Partnership Agreement (EPA) in 2019 further strengthening the bond between the two long-standing economic partners, and the newly adopted Free Trade Agreements — EU-Singapore FTA in 2019, and EU-Vietnam FTA in 2020, EU Gateway | Business Avenues lifted thousands European companies to new heights. Today, its legacy provides a solid base geared towards tighter international business cooperation and the “next” normal: a more sustainable future founded on digital and global health.

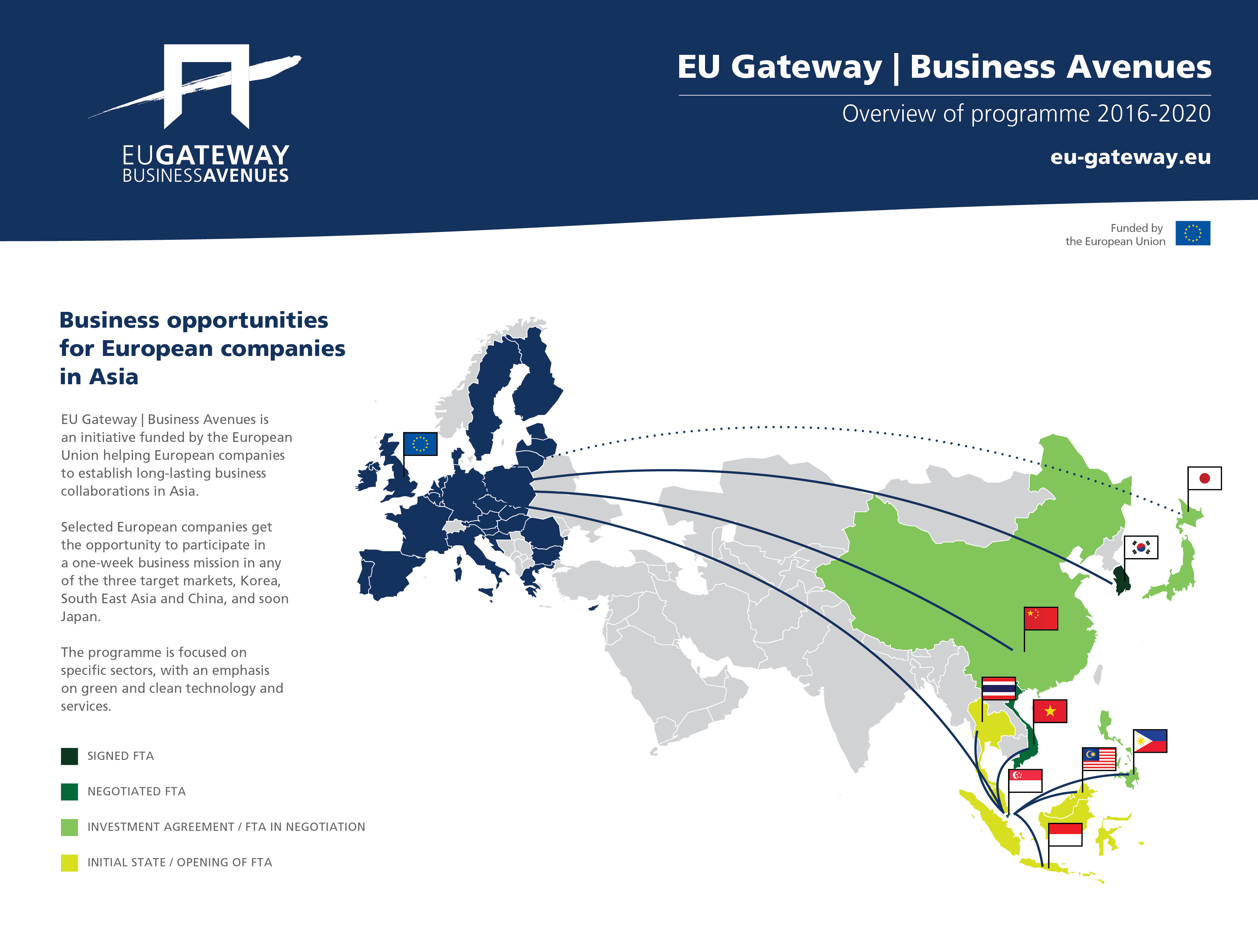
Business Avenues is an initiative funded by the European Union helping European companies to establish long-lasting business collaborations in Asia. Selected European companies get the opportunity to participate in a one-week business mission in any of the three target markets, Korea, South East Asia and China, and soon Japan. The programme is focused on specific sectors, with an emphasis on green and clean technology and services.

== Achievements and results ==
In 2020, the EU Gateway Programme reached 30 years of history. In this timespan, over 6,200 European companies participated in 168 EU-funded business missions successfully entering the Asian markets.

The results tallied between 2016 and 2019, over 5,000 new jobs were created within one year from the EU-funded mission and 57% of the participating companies declared they had either concluded new sales or signed business contracts or were expecting to do so shortly after they participated in a mission.

Between 2016 and 2020, EU Gateway | Business Avenues received approximately 9,600 expressions of interest from European companies, and over 2,200 were chosen to participate to one or more EU-funded business missions to Asia. In this five-year run, the Programme pre-arranged 24,000 B2B meetings, and over 38,000 Asian buyers visited the EU pavilions. 92% of the participating companies were satisfied with the Programme, and 98% would apply again.
