= Multi-alignment =

Foreign policy strategy

In international relations, multi-alignment is a foreign policy strategy in which a state simultaneously cultivates strategic partnerships with multiple major powers or blocs, aligning with different actors on different issues, in order to maximize strategic autonomy and national interests. It is primarily applied to the Indian foreign policy under Narendra Modi and S. Jaishankar.

Indian diplomat Shashi Tharoor claims to have introduced the term in the 2000s, using it at the annual conference of Indian ambassadors in 2009 to "a frosty reception." It gained widespread recognition when India's External Affairs Minister S. Jaishankar used it in 2020. Jaishankar has acknowledged Tharoor's claim. Separately, Parag Khanna has claimed to have coined it in 2007. Khanna and Raja Mohan wrote in a 2006 paper: "A neo-Curzonian foreign policy is premised on the logic of Indian centrality, permitting multidirectional engagement--or "multi-alignment"—with all major powers and seeking access and leverage from East Africa to Pacific Asia."

Ian Hall identified three elements of Indian multialignment: 1) membership in various forums, 2) strategic partnerships, 3) normative hedging. It has been distinguished from the "multi-vector" of post-Soviet states like Kazakhstan, which involves distancing from a dominant former hegemon and Yevgeny Primakov's Russian model of multipolarity that applied equidistance among power centres.

It has been described as an increasingly common strategy in the age of multipolarity and apparent end of U.S. global hegemony in the 2020s. Beyond India, it has been discussed by analysts as an actual or potential foreign policy pursued by Indonesia, Brazil, the United Arab Emirates, and others.
