= Hungary–Vietnam relations =

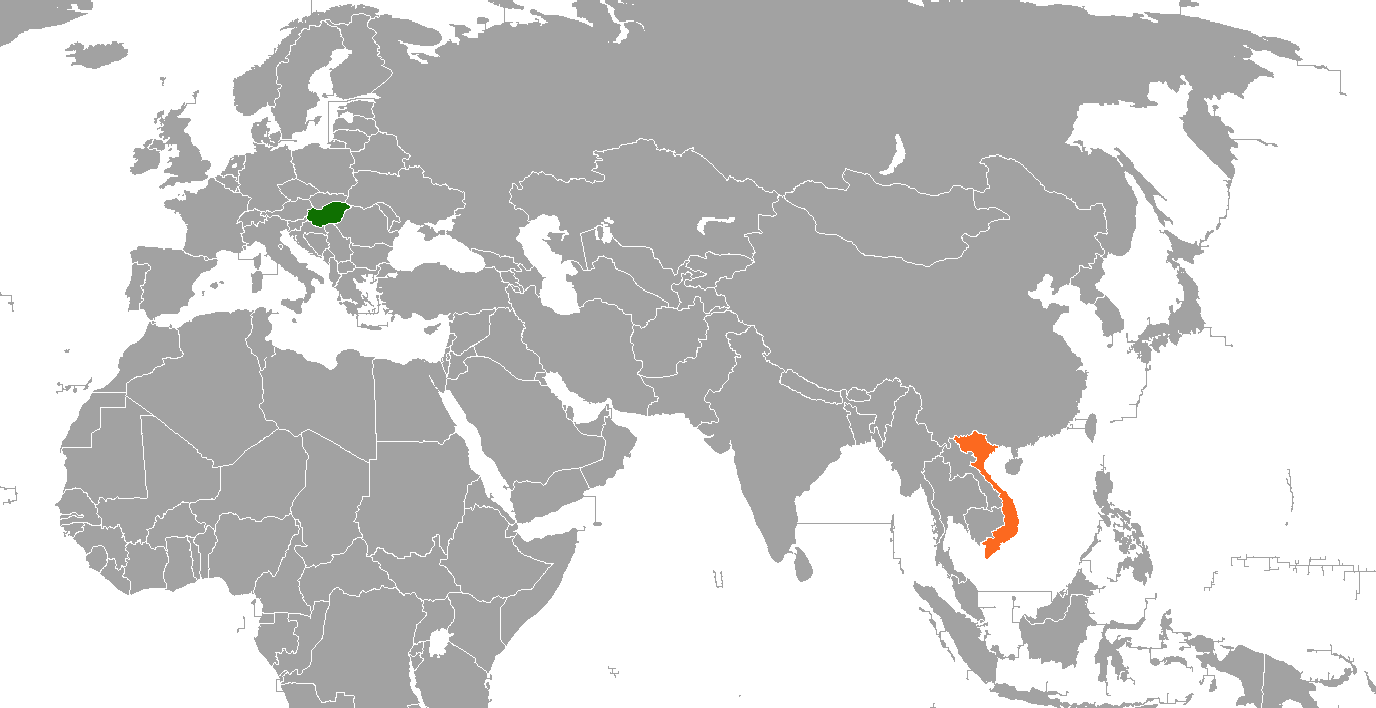

- Hungary: Vietnam

Hungary–Vietnam relations are the diplomatic relations between Hungary and Vietnam. Hungary has an embassy in Hanoi. Vietnam has an embassy in Budapest.

Both countries are full members of the World Trade Organization and United Nations.

== History ==
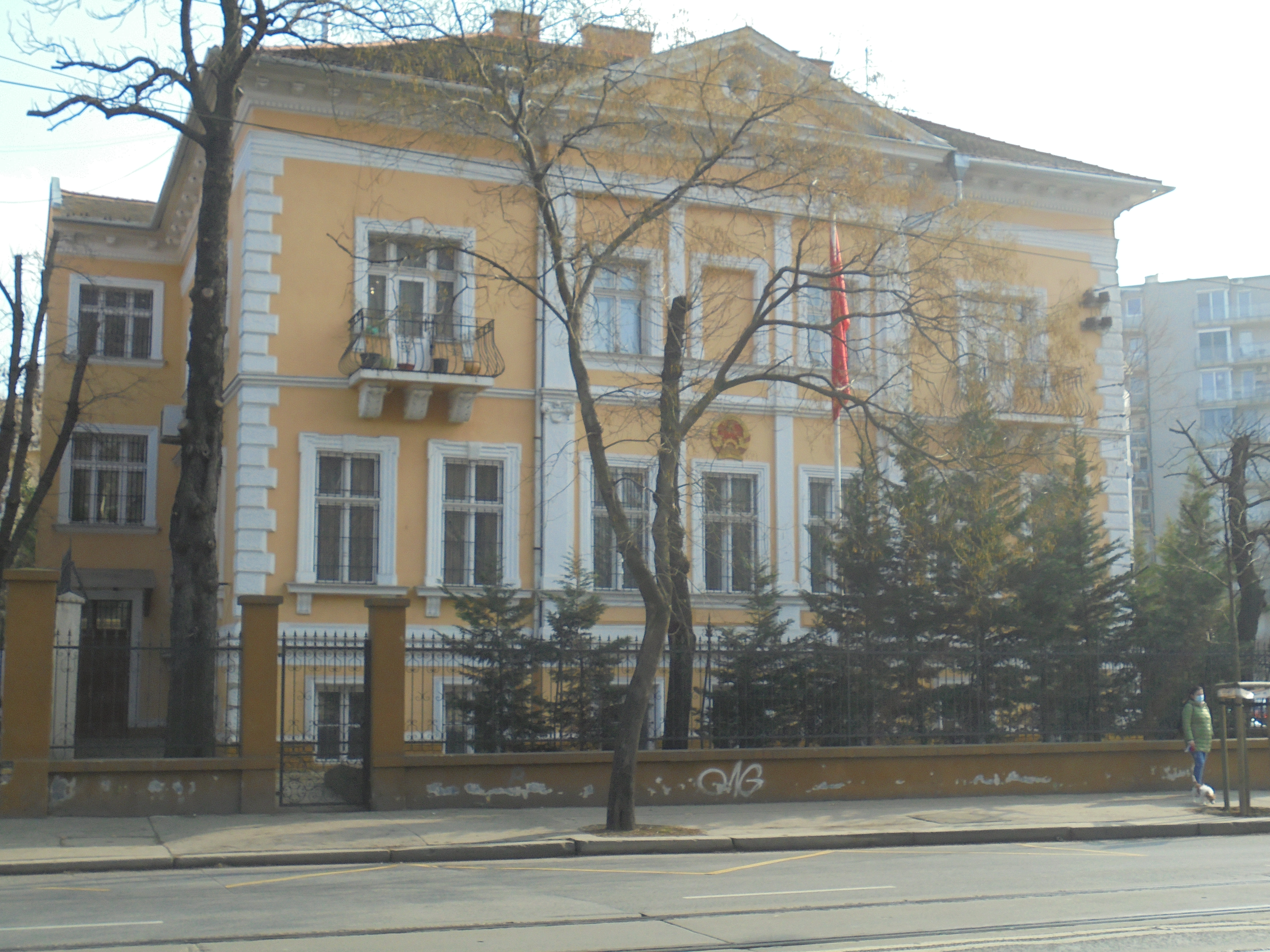
Embassy of Vietnam in Budapest

Hungary and Vietnam established an official relationship in the 1950s when the two countries were both in the Eastern Bloc. Since then, Hungary and Vietnam have developed further relations, with Vietnamese students and workers often going to Hungary to pursue higher education.

During the 1980s, at the height of Cambodian–Vietnamese War, Hungary adopted a neutral policy and remained distanced from the conflict. After the Cold War and collapse of Soviet Union, both Hungary and Vietnam effectively gave up practicing communist ideology in favor of market capitalism, although Vietnam remains under the control of the Communist Party, while Hungary has transitioned back to capitalism.

=== 21st century ===
Relations between Hungary and Vietnam are described as excellent. Hungarian prime minister Viktor Orbán visited Vietnam in 2017.

Vietnam considers Hungary an important economic and key partner in Central Europe, due to its diverse ties and rich history. The two countries developed a strategic partnership in 2018, with the Hungarian prime minister referring to Vietnam as a success in the Far East.

On August 1, 2020, the European Union–Vietnam Free Trade Agreement came into force, which eliminated 99% of tariffs in trade between Vietnam and EU countries, including Hungary.

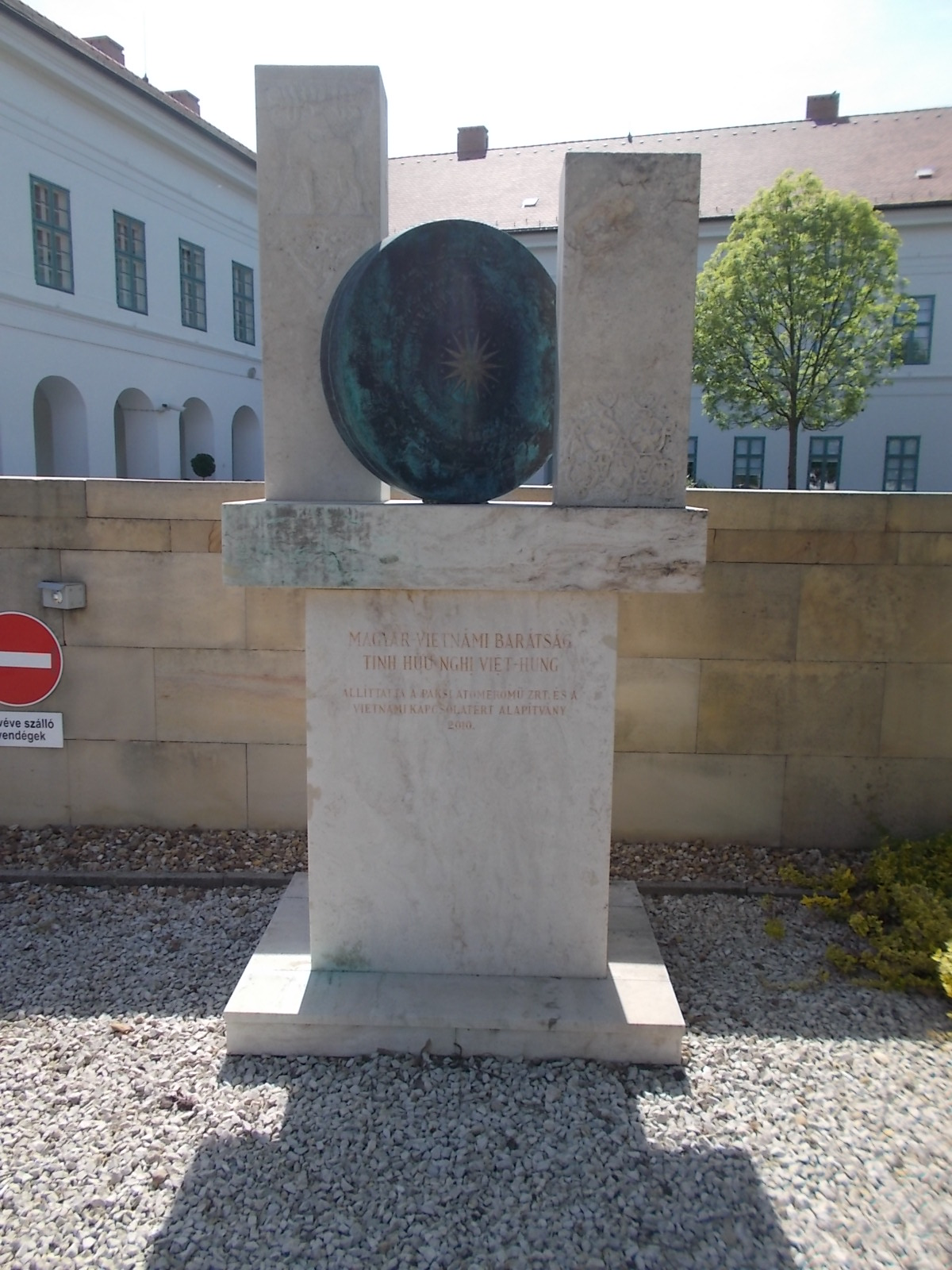
Monument to Hungarian-Vietnamese Friendship in Paks, Hungary

== Vietnamese people in Hungary ==
The Vietnamese community in Hungary is small and, despite historic immigration, Vietnamese tend to be less active and well-integrated into Hungarian society. In 2018, the Hungarian government officially recognized a pagoda that had recently been built by the Vietnamese community. In 2010, Hungary and the European Union (of which Hungary is a member) launched a crackdown on a Vietnamese illegal immigration network. Currently, the Vietnamese community in Hungary has about 5,000 people. Vietnamese people in Hungary mostly live and work in the capital city of Budapest. The Association of Vietnamese in Hungary, established in April 2008, has agreed on the organization between grassroots associations, helping to make the activities of organizations in the community more unified and effective, attracting the participation of local people. Many Vietnamese people live in Hungary. Among the grassroots associations and unions, it is worth mentioning the "leading" role of the Vietnam Business Association in Hungary, established in 2002 and solid support in both finance and spirit for all activities of the community copper.

== Resident diplomatic missions ==
- Hungary has an embassy in Hanoi.
- Vietnam has an embassy in Budapest.

== See also ==
- Foreign relations of Hungary
- Foreign relations of Vietnam
