= Strategic partnership (international relations) =

Comprehensive diplomatic relationship

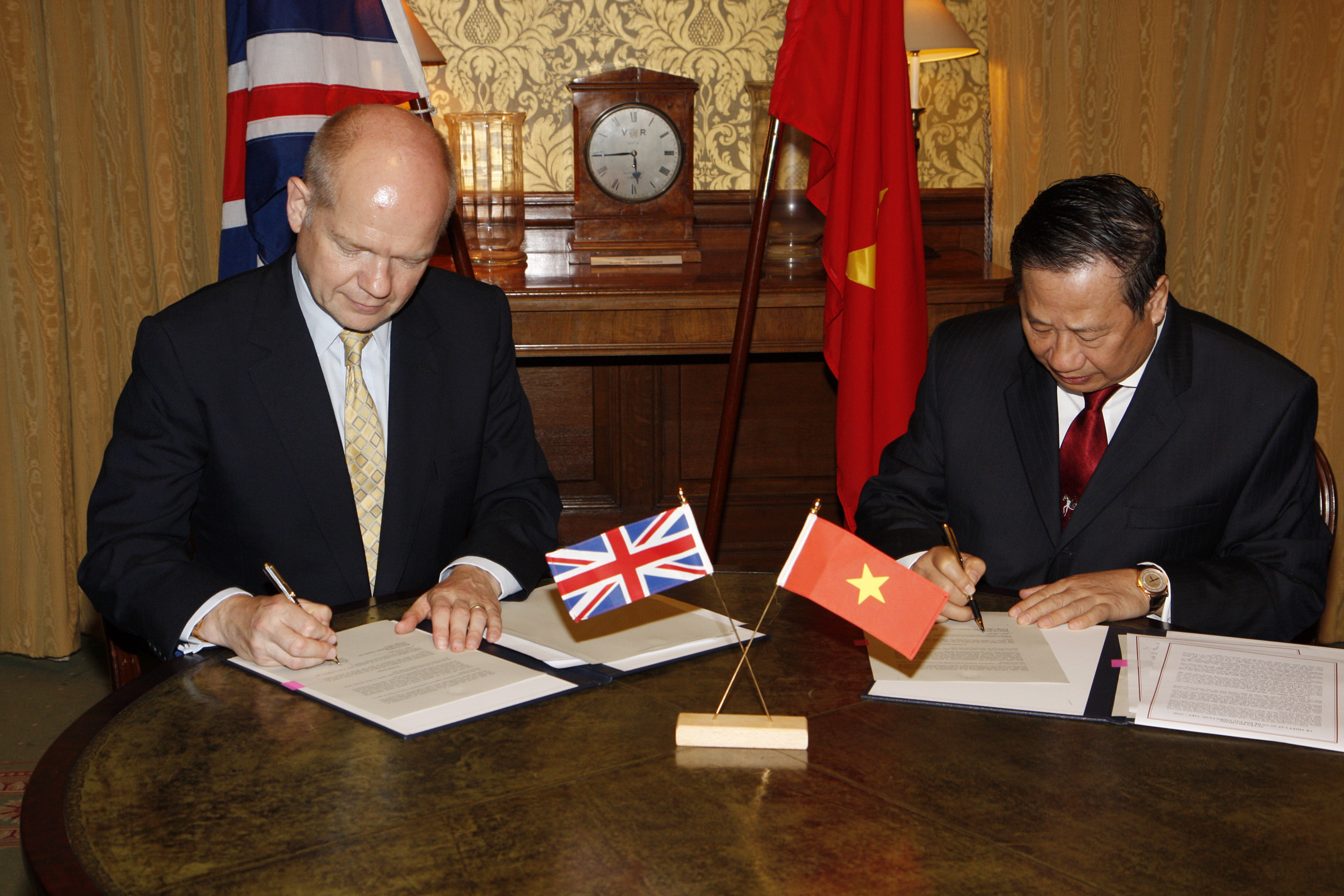
British foreign secretary William Hague and Vietnamese deputy prime minister Phạm Gia Khiêm sign a strategic partnership agreement in 2010

A strategic partnership in international relations is a diplomatic relationship between two (or more) sovereign states (or sometimes between states and international organizations) that is considered especially important or comprehensive. The term generally refers to a long-term, strategic collaboration across multiple areas such as security, defense, economics, science, and politics. Unlike a formal military alliance, a strategic partnership typically does not involve a legally binding defense pact or explicit security guarantees. Instead, it is often an informal or politically declared arrangement that provides a broad framework for cooperation on shared interests. Strategic partnerships are usually less formal and more flexible than alliances, and they may be established (or dissolved) without the strict treaty obligations that alliances entail. The exact scope and commitments of a strategic partnership can vary widely; there is no universal definition, and each partnership is defined by the participating parties' mutual agreements and expectations.

Strategic partnerships became especially prevalent after the end of the Cold War in the early 1990s, as countries sought new forms of cooperation in a multipolar world. They are often seen as a "middle ground" in international relations—more than a basic diplomatic relationship, but less formal (and less binding) than a traditional alliance. By the 21st century, strategic partnerships had proliferated globally and have been described by some analysts as the "new normal" in international diplomacy. These partnerships serve as key instruments for states to pursue common goals, address complex global challenges, and signal close ties, all without the full commitments of an alliance.

== History ==
With the collapse of the bipolar alliance system in the post–Cold War era (exemplified by NATO and the Warsaw Pact), many states began exploring flexible cooperation arrangements to address emerging global issues and power shifts. Rigid, ideologically driven alliances gave way to more pragmatic partnerships in an increasingly interdependent world. Scholars note that the "twilight of the alliances era" coincided with the "dawn of the partnerships age," as countries moved away from traditional alliance paradigms toward more adaptable partnership frameworks. Strategic partnerships emerged as a novel form of alignment to cope with new international security challenges, economic globalization, and transnational issues that did not always fit the old alliance model.

The precise origin of a strategic partnership between states remains unclear, partly because the term itself has been applied retrospectively and inconsistently. Many analysts consider the 1994 agreement between U.S. President Bill Clinton and Russian President Boris Yeltsin—proclaimed as a "new stage of mature strategic partnership based on equality, mutual advantage, and recognition of each other's national interests"—to be an early landmark example. However, there were instances of countries using similar terminology even earlier. For example, Turkey and the United States had announced a strategic partnership as early as 1992, and Brazil and China forged a strategic partnership in 1993. Shortly thereafter, in 1996, China and Russia also declared a "strategic partnership of coordination," reflecting a deepening post-Cold War alignment between those two powers. These examples indicate that by the early 1990s, major states were already experimenting with the concept.

Throughout the late 1990s and 2000s, the use of strategic partnerships expanded rapidly. China became especially active in forming such relationships: beginning with its first partnership (with Brazil in 1993), China had established close to 70 strategic partnerships by 2014. This extensive network included partnerships with countries across Asia, Africa, Europe, and Latin America, as well as with regional blocs. The European Union (EU) also adopted the concept; since 1998, the EU has formally designated strategic partners among key global players as part of its foreign policy strategy. By the 2010s, the EU had ten official "global strategic partners" (Brazil, Canada, China, India, Japan, Mexico, Russia, South Africa, South Korea, and the United States), alongside strategic partnerships with international organizations such as NATO, the African Union, and ASEAN. Other countries like India and Japan likewise adopted the practice: India had around 20 strategic partnerships by the late 2010s (including one with the EU itself), and Japan roughly half that number.

While the widespread terminology of "strategic partnership" took off after the Cold War, earlier forms of partnership diplomacy existed under different names. For instance, ASEAN (the Association of Southeast Asian Nations) has given select countries a formal "Dialogue Partner" status since 1974, an arrangement that predates the modern proliferation of strategic partnerships. Likewise, historically close bilateral relationships – such as the post-World War II "special relationship" between the United Kingdom and the United States – embodied many traits of a strategic partnership without being called as such.

== Characteristics and scope ==
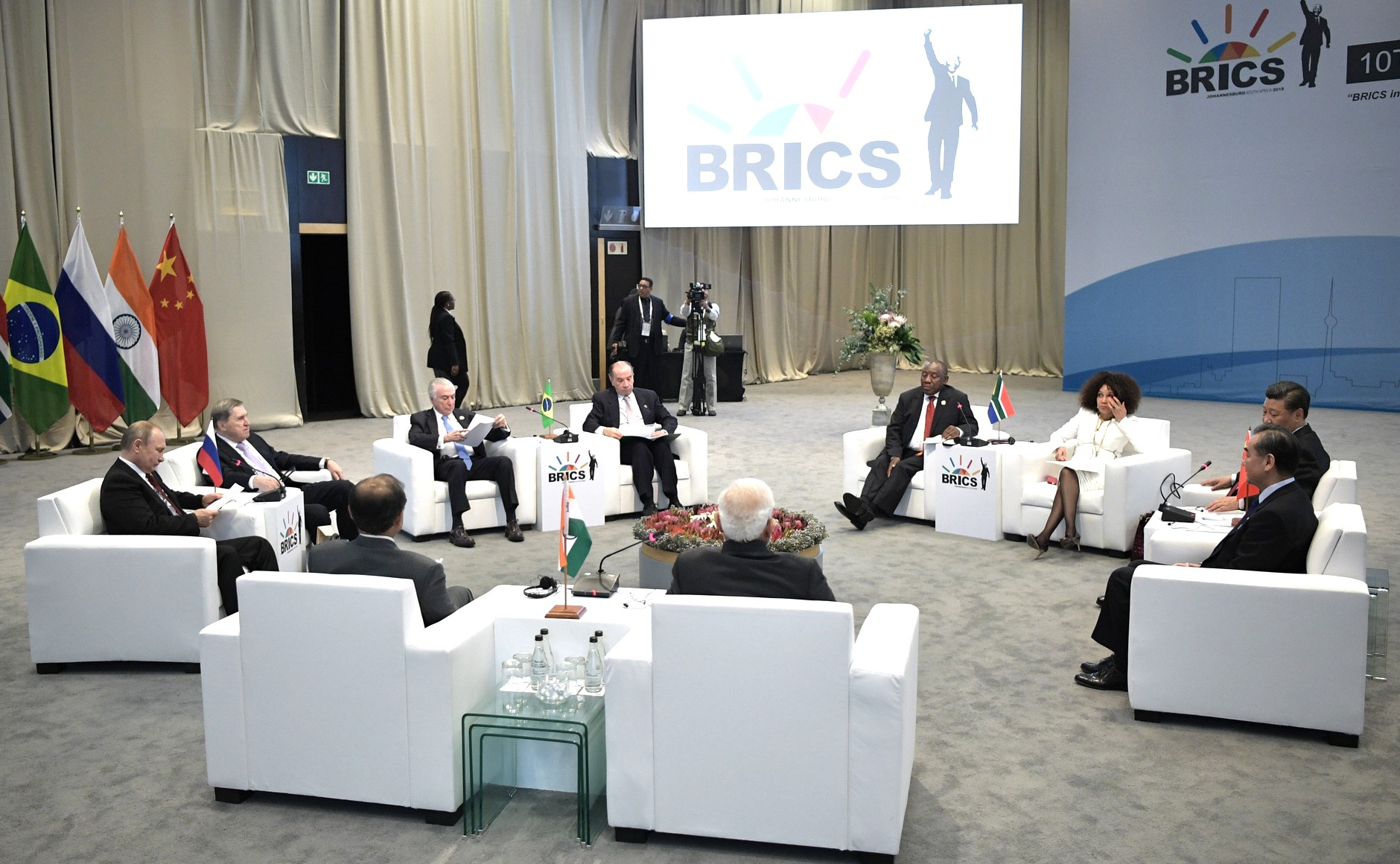
BRICS leaders discuss the formation of a multilateral strategic partnership in 2018

There is no single, universally accepted definition of what exactly constitutes a strategic partnership between states. The meaning of the term can vary depending on the countries involved and the context in which it is used. In general, a strategic partnership implies a high level of importance and long-term commitment attributed to a bilateral relationship. Such partnerships are typically comprehensive or multidimensional in scope, often encompassing cooperation in defense and security, trade and investment, technology, culture, and other areas of mutual interest. The "strategic" label suggests that both parties see the relationship as contributing significantly to their national or regional strategy.

Strategic partnerships are generally more flexible and informal compared to formal alliances. Many strategic partnerships are not codified by a single binding treaty. Instead, they are often announced through joint declarations, memoranda of understanding, or summit statements, which outline broad goals and areas of cooperation. These agreements serve as frameworks rather than enforceable contracts. For example, a strategic partnership may establish regular high-level dialogues, working groups, or consultation mechanisms on security, economic, or cultural issues, without legally obligating the partners to specific actions. Because they typically do not involve mutual defense clauses or automatic military commitments, strategic partnerships allow countries to cooperate closely even when a formal alliance (with its attendant security guarantees) is not feasible or desired.

Economic and developmental cooperation is often a significant component of strategic partnerships, sometimes even more prominent than military aspects. Many partnerships are driven by trade ties, investment agreements, joint infrastructure projects, or technology sharing initiatives. Security cooperation in strategic partnerships can range from intelligence sharing and counterterrorism collaboration to joint military exercises or arms sales—but again, usually without a defense pact that would oblige one partner to defend the other in an armed conflict. In this way, strategic partnerships occupy a middle ground between purely transactional relations and the deep obligations of alliances. They enable states to pursue "win-win" cooperation on shared interests (such as regional stability, economic growth, or combating transnational threats) while avoiding the entanglements of alliance commitments.

Another characteristic of strategic partnerships is that they are often unequal or asymmetrical in terms of power, yet based on mutual benefit and political goodwill. The partners acknowledge each other as important "strategic" actors, even if one is a great power and the other a smaller state or a regional organization. The emphasis is usually on working together "on an equal footing" and finding mutually beneficial outcomes. The language of partnership implies respect for each other's sovereignty and interests, rather than one side unequivocally leading or guaranteeing the other (as might be the case in a patron-client alliance).

Because the term is politically defined rather than legally defined, countries have developed different tiers and terminology to describe their partnerships. For instance, diplomats often distinguish between a "strategic partnership" and a "comprehensive partnership." A comprehensive partnership generally signals broad-based cooperation across many fields, but perhaps without a deep strategic focus, whereas a strategic partnership may indicate intensive cooperation in specific priority areas (like defense or high technology). Some relationships are labeled as "comprehensive strategic partnerships," implying both breadth and depth of cooperation—wide-ranging collaboration coupled with a focus on key strategic sectors. There are also terms like "enhanced strategic partnership" or "special strategic partnership" used by certain countries to denote an even higher level of partnership; for example, Vietnam employs a formal hierarchy of partnerships: it differentiates between a basic partnership, a strategic partnership, and a comprehensive strategic partnership, with the latter being the most elevated status in its bilateral relations framework. In Vietnam's case, comprehensive strategic partners include great powers with which it seeks maximum cooperation (even if those powers are rivals with each other), illustrating that such partnerships do not equate to exclusive alliances.

The substance of a strategic partnership is determined by what the partners do under their banner. Some strategic partnerships involve significant, concrete cooperation programs—including defense coordination, large-scale economic initiatives, or joint development projects—while others might be criticized as largely symbolic or rhetorical. The terminology can at times outpace reality: countries may declare a strategic partnership as a diplomatic signal of goodwill or intention, even if practical cooperation remains limited. Analysts have observed that these announcements are often "largely rhetorical" but still serve as tools of diplomacy by signaling alignment or friendship. The actual impact of a given partnership depends on follow-up actions, such as treaties, trade deals, military aid, or institutionalized dialogues that fall under the partnership's umbrella.

== Usage and examples ==
Strategic partnerships have become a common feature of modern foreign policy for countries across different regions and political systems. Many great and emerging powers and regional organizations systematically employ this concept to structure their external relations.

=== China ===
Since the 1990s, China has integrated strategic partnerships as a central component of its foreign policy, using varied designations such as "strategic," "comprehensive," and "cooperative" partnerships to strengthen bilateral and regional relations. These partnerships aim to promote economic cooperation, access to resources, and political goodwill while avoiding formal military alliances. By the mid-2010s, China had built partnerships with over 80 countries, including major economies like Brazil, the European Union, India, and Russia, as well as nations across Africa, Latin America, and Asia. This framework expanded further after 2012, encompassing nearly 100 countries and several regional organizations. Partnerships are classified into general, comprehensive, strategic, and "all-weather" categories, with the latter reflecting the closest ties. Many of these relationships are linked to China's Belt and Road Initiative (BRI) and the 21st Century Maritime Silk Road, launched in 2013 to promote infrastructure development and economic connectivity. Guided by its post–Cold War policy of "partnership and non-alignment," China's approach emphasizes flexibility, mutual benefit, and equality among states, allowing it to deepen cooperation without binding military commitments.

=== European Union ===
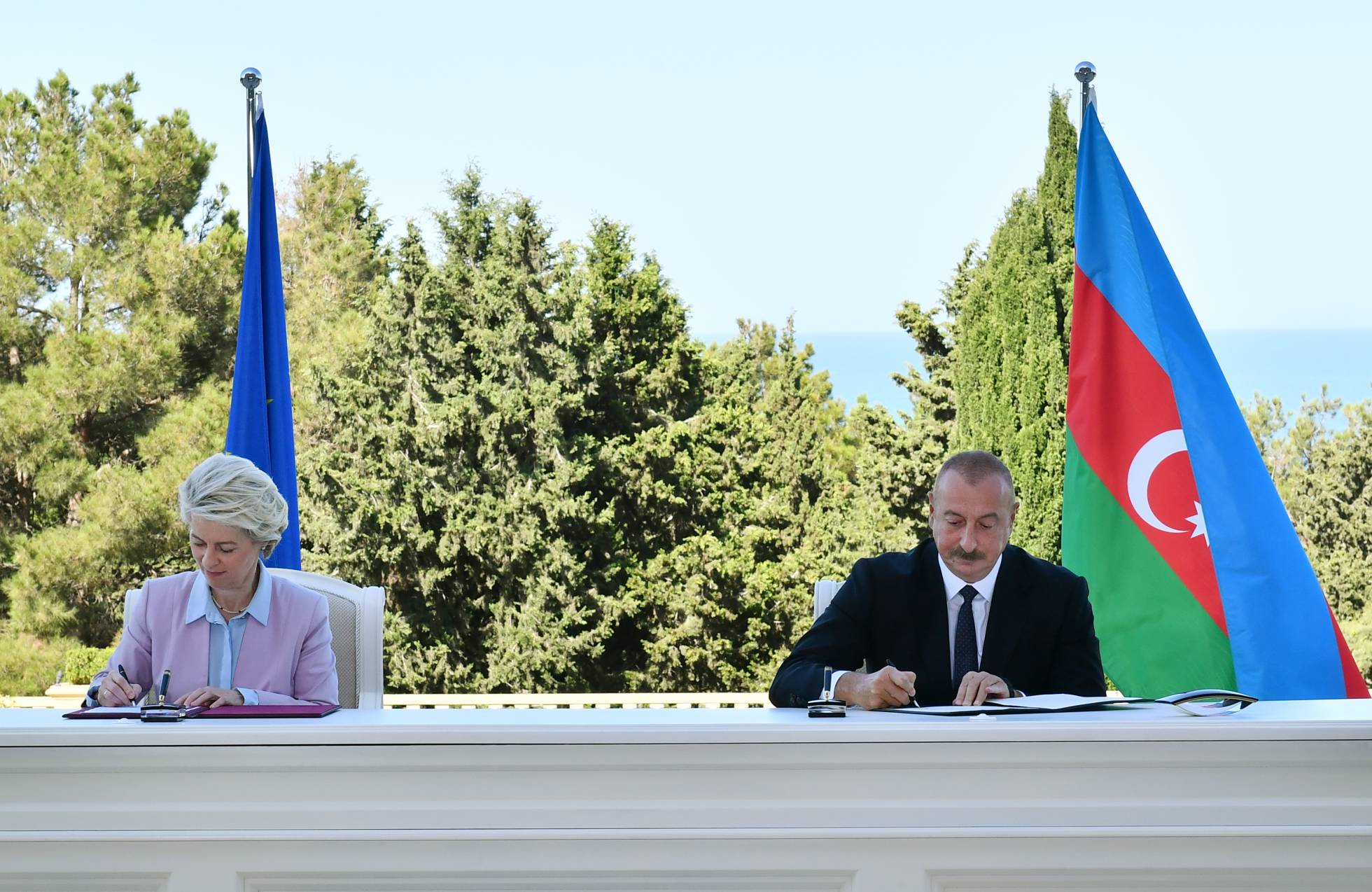
European Commission president Ursula von der Leyen and Azerbaijani president Ilham Aliyev (L-R) sign an MoU on a strategic partnership between Azerbaijan and the EU in energy in 2022

Strategic partnerships have been a key feature of the European Union's external relations, especially since the early 2000s. In 2003, the European Security Strategy explicitly mentioned the need for the EU to work with "key partners" to address global challenges, leading to an official policy of cultivating strategic partnerships. The EU identified a set of "global strategic partners," conventionally major powers like Brazil, Canada, China, India, Japan, Mexico, Russia, South Africa, and South Korea. These relationships aim to promote effective multilateralism and cooperation on issues like security, trade, climate change, and global governance. In addition to states, the EU also establishes strategic partnerships with organizations—for instance, it has institutionalized strategic partnerships with the African Union, ASEAN, NATO, and others. The effectiveness of some EU strategic partnerships has been debated; the EU's global strategic partnerships with China and Russia, which were initially seen as cooperative engagements, later became strained. After events like Russia's 2014 annexation of Crimea and growing geopolitical tensions with China, the EU officially began referring to those two as "strategic rivals" despite the earlier partnership nomenclature.

=== India ===
Post-Cold War India departed from a non-aligned stance to actively forge strategic partnerships as part of its "multi-alignment" strategy. After the Cold War, the collapse of the Soviet Union (previously India's main patron) and the emergence of a new unipolar, then multipolar, world made India's traditional non-aligned policy no longer feasible. At the same time, an economic crisis in 1991 forced India to liberalize its economy, pushing the government to seek foreign investment and technology through wider international engagement. To safeguard its strategic autonomy and foster national development, India adopted a policy of "multi-alignment," forging strategic partnerships with multiple major powers and regional players instead of binding itself to any one alliance. Accordingly, India cultivated closer ties with the United States and other major powers while simultaneously engaging neighboring countries and joining multilateral groupings such as the ASEAN and forums like BRICS, aligning on specific issues of mutual interest rather than along Cold War-era ideological lines. Key drivers of this approach included economic and security imperatives – notably the need for foreign capital, trade, and defense cooperation, and the desire to balance the rising influence of China by the U.S. and several Asia-Pacific countries – all pursued without abandoning relations with traditional partners like Russia.

=== Russia ===
After the Soviet-era alliance system ended, the Russian Federation also turned to strategic partnerships to build its foreign relations, especially with non-Western powers. Russia proclaimed strategic partnerships with countries like China, India, and various states in Latin America and Asia. These partnerships often emphasize military-technical cooperation, energy ties (oil and gas agreements), and diplomatic support. For example, the China–Russia strategic partnership, first announced in 1996 and repeatedly upgraded since, is a key element of both countries' foreign policies. Russia has generally avoided entering new formal alliances (apart from its security organization, the CSTO, with some post-Soviet states), preferring the flexibility of strategic partnerships, which do not legally constrain its actions. In recent years, Russia's relationships with nations such as Iran or North Korea have also been termed strategic partnerships, reflecting growing ties amid international isolation from the West. Notably, in 2023, Russia and North Korea signed a "comprehensive strategic partnership" agreement that included expressions of mutual support and even security assurances, although analysts pointed out it still fell short of a full military alliance.

=== United States ===
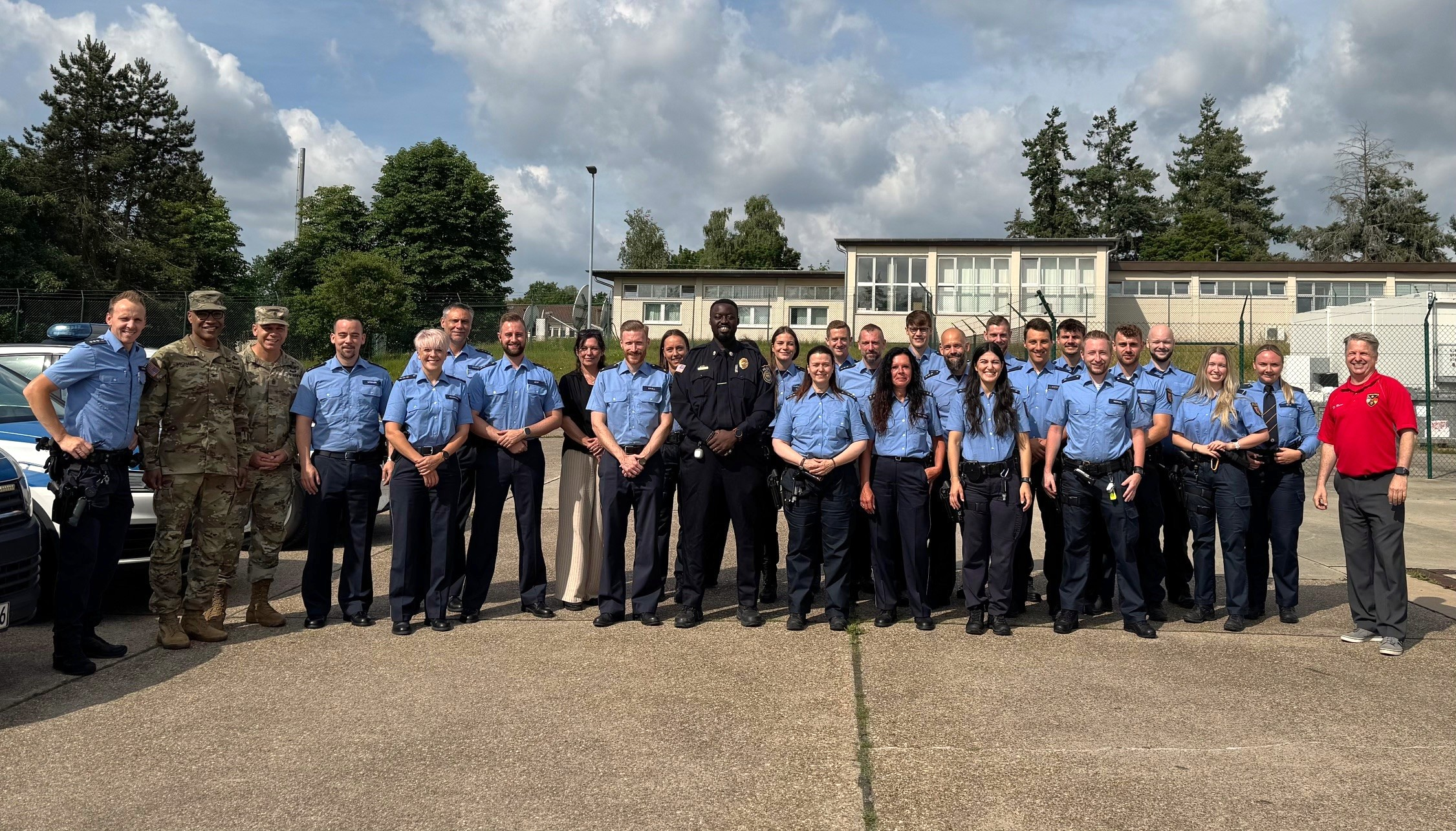
The Germany–U.S. strategic partnership includes cooperation between the German federal police and the U.S. military police

The United States traditionally relies on formal alliances (such as ANZUS, NATO, or bilateral defense treaties) for its core security relationships, but it also uses the language of strategic partnership in many other contexts. The U.S. government has at times declared strategic partnerships with countries that are not treaty allies, as a way to deepen cooperation. For example, the United States has or had strategic partnership frameworks with India, Uzbekistan, Pakistan, Afghanistan, Colombia, Chile, Saudi Arabia, Mongolia, Singapore, Ukraine, Iraq, Vietnam, Indonesia, Qatar, and Armenia. The term is also applied in reinforcing already allied relations; American officials may refer to NATO allies (e.g., Poland and Romania) as strategic partners, underlining close cooperation even though those relationships are formal alliances by treaty. In addition, the U.S. engages in strategic partnerships with regional blocs or institutions – a recent example being the U.S.–ASEAN Comprehensive Strategic Partnership established in 2022, which broadened U.S. engagement with Southeast Asian nations as a group.

== See also ==
- Multi-alignment
- Strategic alliance – Agreement between two or more parties (in a general sense)
- Strategic partnership – Type of business partnership

== Bibliography ==
- Tyushka, Andriy; Czechowska, Lucyna (2019). "Strategic partnerships, international politics and IR theory". In Agata Domachowska; Andriy Tyushka; Joanna Piechowiak-Lamparska; Karolina Gawron-Tabor; Lucyna Czechowska (eds.). States, International Organizations and Strategic Partnerships. Edward Elgar Publishing. ISBN 9781788972277.
