= Vietnam–European Union relations =

European Union–Vietnam relations
- European Union: Vietnam

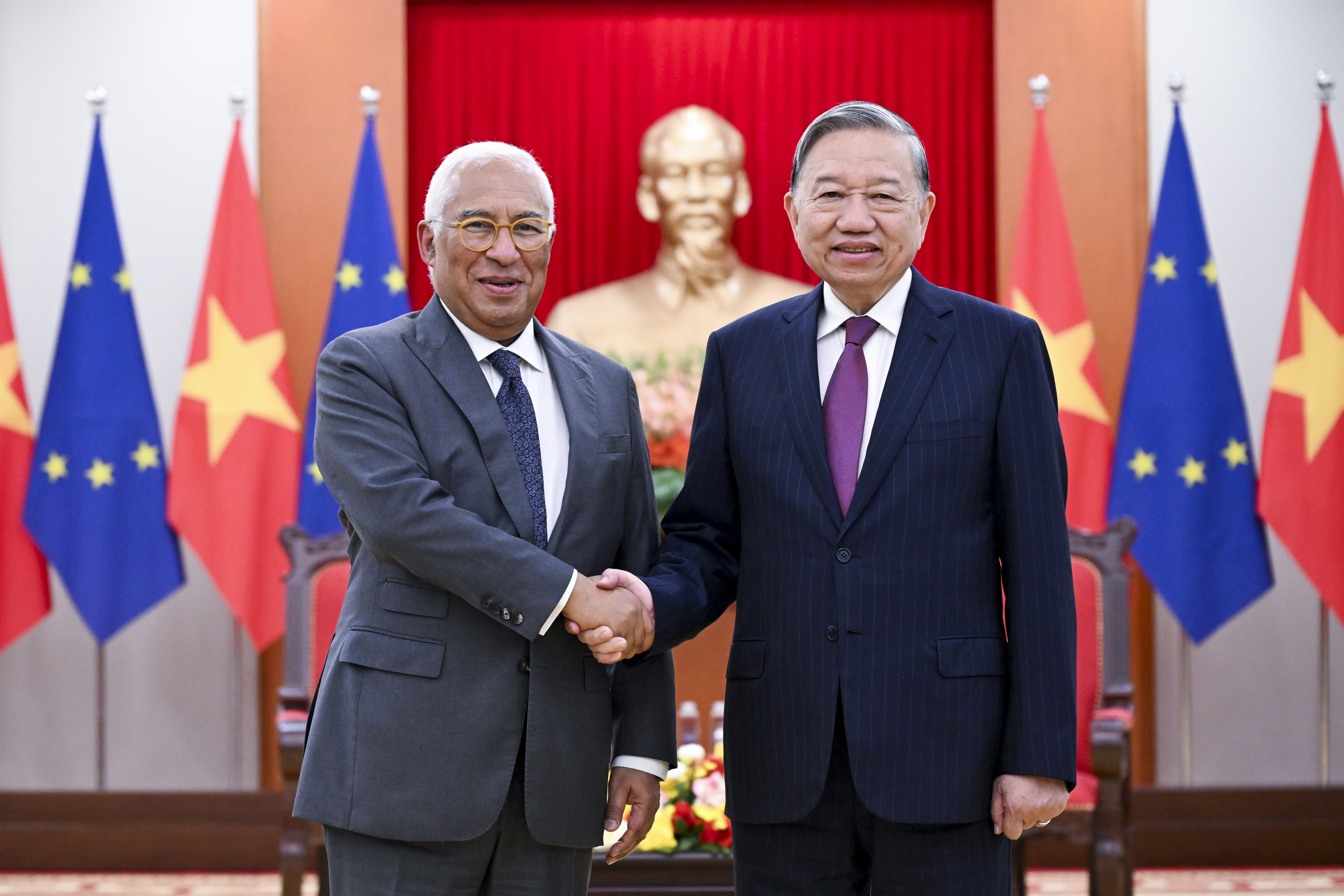
President of the European Council António Costa meets with Tô Lâm, General Secretary of the Communist Party of Vietnam, in January 2026.

Vietnam–European Union relations are the multilateral relations between the Socialist Republic of Vietnam and the European Union (EU). Diplomatic ties between Vietnam and the European Economic Community (EEC) were established in 1990. The legal basis of the bilateral relations between Vietnam and the EU was the Framework Cooperation Agreement, signed after the first meeting conducted by the Joint Commission in 1996. A Free Trade Agreement and an Investment Protection Agreement between both parts were signed on 30 June 2019. The EU–Vietnam Free Trade Agreement (EVFTA) was greenlighted by the European Parliament on 12 February 2020. Both the EVFTA and the Investment Protection Agreement (EVIPA) were ratified by the Vietnamese National Assembly on 8 June 2020.

== Vietnam's foreign relations with EU member states ==
- Austria
- Belgium
- Bulgaria
- Croatia
- Cyprus
- Czech Republic
- Denmark
- Estonia
- Finland
- France
- Germany
- Greece
- Hungary
- (Republic of Ireland) Ireland
- Italy
- Latvia
- Lithuania
- Luxembourg
- Malta
- Netherlands
- Poland
- Portugal
- Romania
- Slovakia
- Slovenia
- Spain
- Sweden

== See also ==
- Foreign relations of the European Union
- Foreign relations of Vietnam
- United States–Vietnam relations
- China–Vietnam relations
- Russia–Vietnam relations
