= Vietnam–Korea Free Trade Agreement =

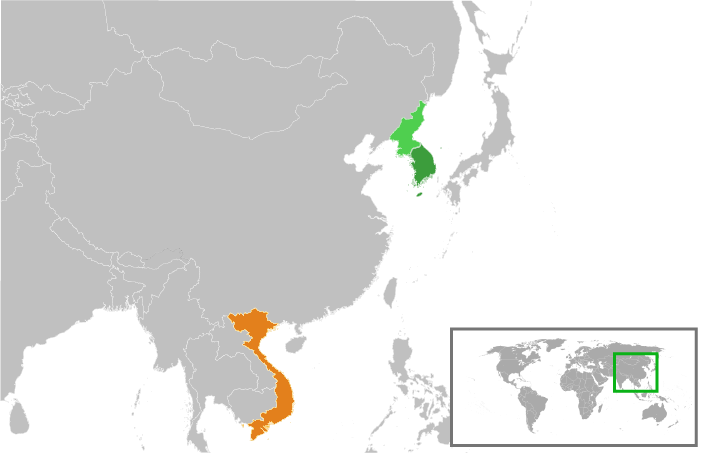
- Geographical locations of Vietnam and South Korea. (Note: Territory controlled by the Republic of Korea (dark blue); claimed but not controlled (light blue).)
- Abbreviation: VKFTA
- Other name: Viet Nam–Korea Free Trade Agreement 한-베트남 자유무역협정
- FTA Type: Bilateral
- Negotiation: 6 August 2012
- Completed: 10 December 2014
- Date signed: 5 May 2015
- Location signed: Hanoi
- Date effective: 20 December 2015
- Signatories: Vietnam; South Korea
- Structure: 17 chapters 208 articles 15 annexes 01 implementing agreement
- Primary language: English • Vietnamese • Korean

The Vietnam–Korea Free Trade Agreement (VKFTA; Korean: 한-베트남 자유무역협정) is an international treaty signed between the Socialist Republic of Vietnam and the Republic of Korea regarding the establishment of a free trade area and bilateral economic cooperation. The VKFTA was initiated in 2009 after the diplomatic relations between the two countries reached the level of a strategic cooperative partnership. It underwent feasibility studies by both parties, followed by specific negotiations on various issues during the 2012–14 period. It was signed and officially entered into force in 2015, becoming one of Vietnam's first bilateral free trade agreements. This agreement is also considered one of the key trade and investment accords contributing to the process of upgrading the diplomatic relations between the two countries to a Comprehensive Strategic Partnership in 2022.

The VKFTA consists of 17 chapters, 208 articles, 15 annexes, and an implementing agreement. It was built upon previous international treaties to which both countries are members, such as the regulations of the World Trade Organization, the Vietnam–Korea Investment Promotion and Protection Agreement, RCEP, ASEAN+3, APEC, and ASEM, while delving deeper into market access areas and increasing incentives for partners. Trade in goods, with agreements to reduce or eliminate a large number of tariffs on product lines; trade in services, with new points regarding the movement of natural persons; and investment, which addresses the settlement of international investment disputes through jurisdictional bodies such as ICSID and UNCITRAL, are the key areas highlighted in the VKFTA.

== Economic relations ==
On 22 December 1992 Vietnam and South Korea officially established diplomatic relations. In 2001, the relationship was upgraded from a regular partnership to a "Comprehensive Partnership in the 21st Century" with the agreement of the President Trần Đức Lương and the President Kim Dae-jung; and further upgraded to a "Strategic Cooperative Partnership" in May 2009 following talks between the two Prime Ministers, Nguyễn Tấn Dũng and Han Seung-soo. In October 2009, President Lee Myung-bak visited Vietnam, and together with President Nguyễn Minh Triết, issued a joint statement, agreeing to initiate discussions on establishing a joint working group to study the possibility of promoting and the feasibility of a Vietnam–Korea Free Trade Agreement to expand economic cooperation in trade and investment. Implementing this statement, in March 2010, the two countries established the Joint Working Group on the Vietnam–Korea FTA, composed of representatives from government agencies and research institutions of both countries, for the purpose of conducting joint studies on the feasibility of signing a bilateral free trade agreement.

== See also ==
- Vietnam–South Korea relations
- ASEAN–Korea Free Trade Area
