= Comprehensive strategic partnerships of Vietnam =

Overview of Vietnam's diplomatic relations

Strategic partnership (đối tác chiến lược) and comprehensive partnership (đối tác toàn diện) are phrases that regularly designate diplomatic relations between two countries. Relations range from bilateral partners, regional partners, to comprehensive partners, and strategic partners. By 2013, although there had been 10 strategic partnerships established over the previous 10 years, Vietnamese foreign policy makers had not yet come up with a clear definition of the concept. In an interview with the Government Newspaper in 2015, Mr. Tran Viet Thai, Deputy Director of the Institute of Strategic Studies, Diplomatic Academy, reported: Vietnam has 5 comprehensive strategic partners, 15 strategic partners. Strategic (including four comprehensive strategic partners) and 12 comprehensive partners. According to master Le Hong Hiep, a relationship should be considered "strategic" for Vietnam only if it has particularly important implications for Vietnam's security, prosperity, and international position. Of these three aspects, the two aspects of security and prosperity must be the two essential aspects, while the last aspect is only of secondary significance.

As of 2025, Vietnam currently has: 14 Comprehensive Strategic Partners; 25 Strategic Partners (including 14 Comprehensive Strategic Partners), and 15 Comprehensive Partners. Of which 8/10 countries are CPTPP members (excluding Vietnam), with 1 country being a Comprehensive Strategic Partner, 4 countries being Strategic Partners, and 3 countries being Comprehensive Partners; The remaining two countries that do not have high-level partnerships are Peru and Mexico. With ASEAN countries, Vietnam has currently established high-level diplomatic relations with all 9/9 member countries (excluding Vietnam), with 5 countries being Strategic Partners and 2 countries being Comprehensive Partners; The remaining three countries, Cambodia, Laos, and Cuba, are under Special Relations.

Another special case among Vietnam's partners is the United States, which has had its relationship level upgraded from a Comprehensive Partnership (established in 2013) to the highest level of Comprehensive Strategic Partnership (established in 2023), which ignores the Strategic Partnership level.

== Enhanced Comprehensive Strategic Partnership ==
In July 2007, Prime Minister Nguyễn Tấn Dũng visited India, and the leaders of the two countries officially raised the relationship to the level of "strategic partnership" with increased political cooperation in the direction of increasingly integrating tightly and trustworthily.

During Indian Prime Minister Narendra Modi's visit to Vietnam on September 2–3, 2016, the two countries agreed to upgrade their bilateral relationship from a Strategic Partnership to a "Comprehensive Strategic Partnership". During the visit of Vietnam Secretary General to India in May 2026, Vietnam and India had agree to elevate the two countries relationships to the Enhanced Comprehensive Strategic Partnership. As of May 2026, India is only country where Vietnam have the Enhanced Comprehensie Strategic Partnership with.

== Comprehensive Strategic Partnership ==
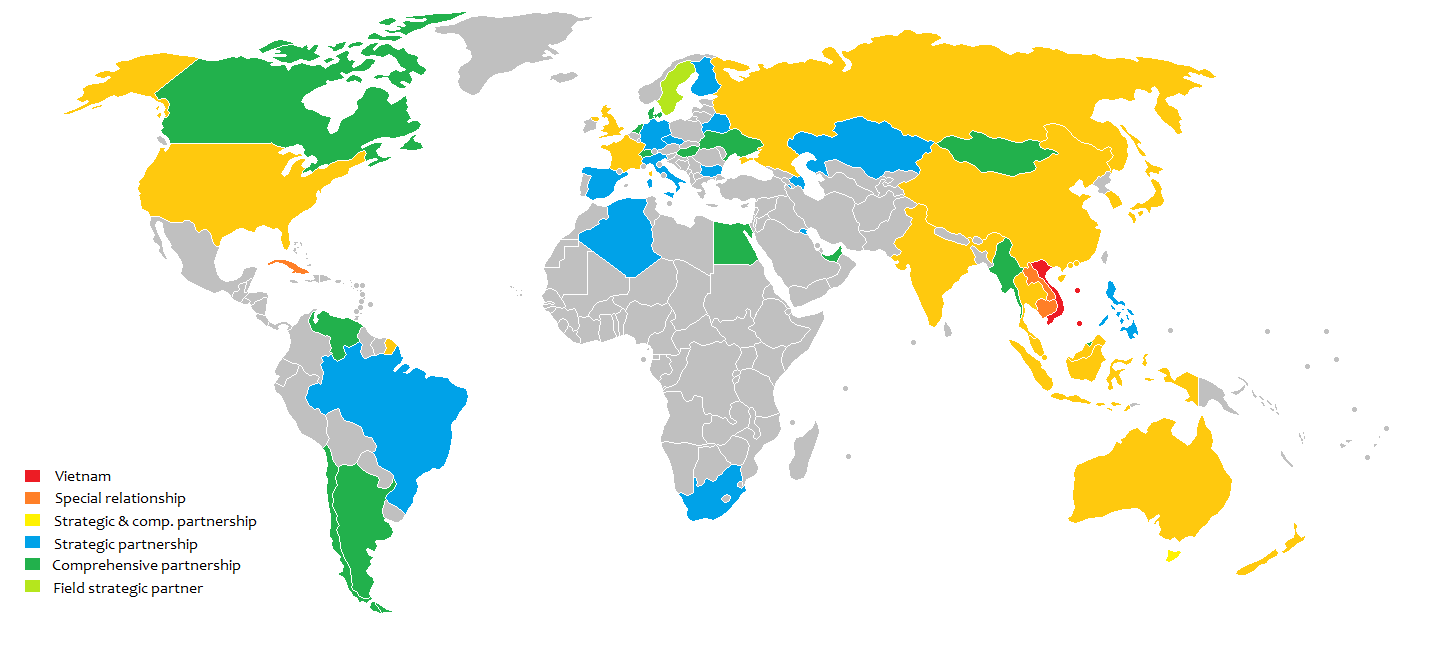
Countries and their level of partnership relationship with Vietnam

A comprehensive strategic partnership (Đối tác chiến lược toàn diện), also known as a comprehensive strategic cooperation partner, means two or more parties identify long-term interests, support each other, and promote extensive and comprehensive cooperation across the world. All areas where both parties benefit. At the same time, the two sides also build mutual trust at the strategic level.

As of 2026, there are 15 countries with comprehensive strategic partnerships with Vietnam:

- one in the Americas: United States (September 10, 2023)
- three in East Asia: China (May 2008), South Korea (December 5, 2022), Japan (November 27, 2023)
- four in Southeast Asia: Malaysia (November 21, 2024), Indonesia (March 10, 2025), Singapore (March 12, 2025), Thailand (May 16, 2025)
- two in Australasia: Australia (March 7, 2024), New Zealand (February 26, 2025)
- three in Europe: Russia (July 27, 2012), France (October 8, 2024), United Kingdom (October 29, 2025), Denmark (October 20, 2026)

The list below is listed by year of relationship upgrade:

=== China ===
During the official visit to China in May 2008 of General Secretary Nông Đức Mạnh, senior leaders of the two countries agreed to build a "Comprehensive strategic cooperative partnership" in the 21st century based on 16 Word Guideline "Friendly neighbors, Comprehensive cooperation, long-term stability, looking to the future" and the 4 good spirit "Good neighbors, good friends, good comrades, good partners".

On the occasion of the state visit of General Secretary - President Xi Jinping to Hanoi from December 12–13, 2023, the two sides signed a Joint Declaration on "continuing to deepen and further enhance bilateral relations, comprehensive strategic cooperative partnership, building a strategically meaningful Vietnam-China Future Sharing Community".

=== Russia ===
On March 1, 2001, during the official visit to Vietnam by President of Russia Vladimir Putin, the first official visit to Vietnam by the Russian head of state since Russia was founded in 1991, the two sides signed the Joint Declaration Statement on strategic partnership. This is considered the foundation for cooperation between Vietnam and Russia in the 21st century. Russia also became the first country to establish a strategic partnership with Vietnam.

On November 20, 2006, during Russian President Putin's second visit to Vietnam, the two sides issued a statement on "strategic partnership and comprehensive cooperation between the two countries".

On July 27, 2012, during President Trương Tấn Sang's visit to Russia, the two sides issued a Joint Statement on strengthening Vietnam-Russia relations, recognizing the two countries' "comprehensive strategic partnership".

=== South Korea ===
In October 2009, during the visit to Vietnam of Korean President Lee Myung-bak, President Nguyễn Minh Triết and he announced upgrading the two countries' relationship to a "Strategic Cooperative Partnership".

On the afternoon of December 5, 2022, immediately after the talks in Seoul between President Nguyễn Xuân Phúc and Korean President Yoon Suk-yeol, the two countries agreed to upgrade their bilateral relationship from Strategic Partnership to "Strategic Partnership". Comprehensive strategic partnership" on the occasion of the 30th anniversary of establishing bilateral diplomatic relations (December 22, 1992 - December 22, 2022).

=== United States ===
On July 25, 2013, a meeting took place at the White House between President Trương Tấn Sang and US President Barack Obama. The two leaders decided to establish a comprehensive partnership between Vietnam and the United States based on the principles of respect for the United Nations Charter, international law, respect for political institutions, independence, sovereignty, and each other's territorial integrity.

On September 10, 2023, during the official State visit from September 10–11, 2023, of President Joe Biden to Vietnam at the invitation of General Secretary Nguyễn Phú Trọng, the two sides issued a Joint Communiqué, officially upgrading the relationship to the level of Comprehensive Strategic Partnership. This is also the first time in history that Vietnam has upgraded its partnership with a country from the level of Comprehensive Partnership to the highest level of Comprehensive Strategic Partnership, skipping the level of Strategic Partnership, in just 10 years (from 2013 to 2023).

=== Japan ===
In October 2006, on the occasion of Prime Minister Nguyễn Tấn Dũng's official visit to Japan, the two sides agreed to issue a Joint Declaration on "Towards a strategic partnership for peace and prosperity in Asia".

In April 2009, during General Secretary Nông Đức Mạnh's visit to Japan, the two sides officially established the "Strategic Partnership for peace and prosperity in Asia" relationship.

On March 18, 2014, President Trương Tấn Sang and Japanese Prime Minister Abe Shinzō signed a joint statement upgrading the Vietnam-Japan Strategic Partnership to a new level into "Warfare Partnership". A far-reaching Strategy for Peace and Prosperity in Asia".

During the visit to Japan from November 22–25, 2021 of Prime Minister Phạm Minh Chính with his counterpart - Prime Minister Kishida Fumio, the two sides issued a Joint Statement reaffirming: agreeing to bring the "Partnership" The "Vietnam-Japan Extensive Strategy" has developed to new heights, becoming increasingly profound, substantive and effective in all fields.

On the occasion of his official visit to Japan to attend the 50th Anniversary of establishing diplomatic relations between the two countries, on the afternoon of November 27, 2023, President Võ Văn Thưởng and Prime Minister Kishida Fumio announced the upgrade of relations. The two countries established a "Comprehensive Strategic Partnership for peace and prosperity in Asia and the world".

=== Australia ===
During General Secretary Nông Đức Mạnh's visit to Canberra in September 2009, Australian Deputy Prime Minister Julia Gillard and Vietnamese Deputy Prime Minister Phạm Gia Khiêm signed a joint statement on the Comprehensive Partnership between the two countries. The joint statement sets out six major areas of future cooperation, including: political relations and public policy exchange; economic growth and trade; development support and technical cooperation; defense and security relations; connecting the people of the two countries; and global and regional agenda.

During his trip to Australia from March 14 to 18, 2018, Prime Minister Nguyễn Xuân Phúc was welcomed with the highest protocol for the head of the Government at the Australian Parliament House. Immediately after that, on the morning of March 15, 2018, Prime Minister Nguyễn Xuân Phúc and Australian Prime Minister Malcolm Turnbull signed a Joint Declaration on establishing a Strategic Partnership between the two countries, upgrading Vietnam-Australia relations from comprehensive cooperation in 2009 to the level of Strategic Partner. The two countries also agreed to focus on realizing their intention to upgrade relations to a Comprehensive Strategic Partnership.

On March 7, 2024, on the occasion of Prime Minister Phạm Minh Chính's visit to Australia at the invitation of Prime Minister Anthony Albanese, the two sides agreed to upgrade relations to the highest level of Comprehensive Strategic Partnership, becoming Vietnam's 7th comprehensive strategic partner.

=== France ===
On the occasion of the official visit to France (September 24–26, 2013), Prime Minister Nguyễn Tấn Dũng and French Prime Minister Jean-Marc Ayrault signed the "Joint Declaration on the Vietnam-France Strategic Partnership"

On the occasion of the official visit to France (October 6–7, 2024), General Secretary - President Tô Lâm and French President Emmanuel Macron signed the "Joint Declaration on the Comprehensive Strategic Partnership between Vietnam and France", becoming Vietnam's 8th comprehensive strategic partner.

=== Malaysia ===
In 2004, on the occasion of Prime Minister Phan Văn Khải's visit to Malaysia, the two countries issued a "Joint Declaration on the Comprehensive Partnership framework in the 21st century".

In August 2015, during the official visit of Prime Minister Nguyen Tan Dung, the two countries continued to issue a joint statement establishing a strategic partnership between the two sides.

During General Secretary Tô Lâm's official visit to Malaysia, the two governments decided to upgrade Vietnam-Malaysia relations to a Comprehensive Strategic Partnership.

=== New Zealand ===
In September 2009, General Secretary Nông Đức Mạnh paid an official visit to New Zealand. Senior leaders of the two countries have agreed to establish a Comprehensive Partnership.

At the online High-Level Talk on the morning of July 22, 2020 on the occasion of the 45th anniversary of establishing diplomatic relations between Vietnam and New Zealand (1975-2020) taking place between the two governments, Prime Minister Nguyễn Xuân Phúc and Prime Minister Jacinda Ardern agreed to announce: officially upgrading Vietnam - New Zealand relations to a Strategic Partnership.

On the afternoon of February 26, 2025, during the visit of New Zealand Prime Minister Christopher Luxon to Vietnam from February 25-28, 2025, to attend the ASEAN Future Forum. Prime Minister Phạm Minh Chính and Prime Minister Christopher Luxon had bilateral talks and issued a joint statement agreeing to upgrade bilateral relations to the level of Comprehensive Strategic Partnership.

=== Indonesia ===
In June 2013, President Trương Tấn Sang visited Indonesia at the invitation of President Susilo Bambang Yudhoyono from June 27–28, 2013. After the talks, the two sides agreed to upgrade to a Strategic Partnership.

During a meeting with Indonesian President Joko Widodo on the afternoon of September 4, Prime Minister Phạm Minh Chính proposed that the two countries increase high-level exchanges, effectively promote bilateral cooperation mechanisms, and coordinate well in implementing the signed agreements and agreements aimed at creating momentum for the two countries' relationship to become a comprehensive strategic partnership shortly.

On the afternoon of March 10, 2025, during General Secretary Tô Lâm state visit to Indonesia at the invitation of President Prabowo Subianto, the two sides issued a joint statement agreeing to upgrade the strategic partnership from 2013 to Comprehensive Strategic Partnership, "bringing the bilateral relationship into a new era of deeper, more comprehensive and substantive cooperation for the benefit of the people".

=== Singapore ===
In September 2013, Prime Minister Lee Hsien Loong paid an official visit to Vietnam from September 11–13, 2013. During the talks on September 11, Prime Minister Nguyễn Tấn Dũng and Prime Minister Lee Hsien Loong announced the upgrade of bilateral relations to a strategic partnership and issued a Joint Statement on establishing a strategic partnership, mentioning 5 pillars of cooperation.

In 2023, the leaders of the two countries agreed to consider the possibility of studying upgrading bilateral relations to a comprehensive strategic partnership shortly.

His Excellency To Lam, General Secretary of the Communist Party of Vietnam of the Socialist Republic of Vietnam, visited Singapore for an Official Visit from 11-13 March 2025.

He met Singapore's Prime Minister and Minister for Finance Lawrence Wong, who also hosted an Official Lunch in his honour. Both leaders reaffirmed the excellent bilateral relations, underpinned by regular high-level exchanges and strong economic linkages. General Secretary Lam and Prime Minister Wong announced the upgrade of bilateral relations to a Comprehensive Strategic Partnership, which highlights Singapore and Vietnam’s commitment to deepening cooperation in emerging areas, including the digital economy, renewable energy, and carbon credits.

General Secretary Tô Lâm and Prime Minister Lawrence Wong agreed on the importance of these bilateral efforts and how they could contribute to regional initiatives, such as the ASEAN Digital Economy Framework Agreement and the ASEAN Power Grid. They also witnessed the exchange of Memoranda of Understanding and agreements related to combating transnational crime, digital transformation, offshore wind power trade cooperation, and the development of Vietnam–Singapore Industrial Parks (VSIPs).

The two Leaders agreed that the Strategic Partnership and the Green-Digital Economic Partnership, established in 2013 and 2023 respectively, have brought more substance to bilateral relations. The two Leaders decided to elevate Viet Nam - Singapore relations to a Comprehensive Strategic Partnership.

=== Thailand ===
In June 2013, General Secretary Nguyễn Phú Trọng paid an official visit to Thailand from June 25–27, 2013. General Secretary Nguyễn Phú Trọng and Prime Minister Yingluck Shinawatra agreed to establish a strategic partnership between Vietnam-Thailand, with 5 main pillars: political relations, defense and security cooperation, security, economic cooperation, social and cultural cooperation, and regional and international cooperation.

On May 16, 2025, during the official visit of Prime Minister Paetongtarn Shinawatra to Vietnam, Prime Minister Phạm Minh Chính and Prime Minister Paetongtarn Shinawatra co-chaired the 4th Meeting of the Vietnam - Thailand Joint Cabinet and witnessed the exchange of cooperation documents between the two sides. In a press conference after the event, the two Prime Ministers announced that Vietnam and Thailand had upgraded their relationship to a Comprehensive Strategic Partnership.

=== United Kingdom ===
Within the framework of the official visit to the United Kingdom from September 8–12, 2010, on the afternoon of September 8 (dawn Hanoi time), in London, Deputy Prime Minister, Minister of Foreign Affairs Phạm Gia Khiêm held talks with British Foreign Minister William Hague. Immediately after the talks, the two sides signed a Joint Declaration officially upgrading Vietnam-UK relations to a strategic partnership, creating a framework for the comprehensive development of bilateral relations.

On September 30, 2020, Issued a new Joint Statement on Strategic Partnership with 7 priority areas of cooperation, affirming the direction of elevating relations to a higher level in the next 10 years.

On December 29, 2020, the two sides officially signed the Free Trade Agreement (FTA) on the principle of inheriting the UKVFTA.

At the invitation of Prime Minister Keir Starmer, General Secretary Tô Lâm and his wife Spouse of the General Secretary Ngô Phương Ly, along with a high-ranking Vietnamese delegation, paid an official visit to the United Kingdom from October 28 to 30, 2025. This is the first visit by the General Secretary of the Communist Party of Vietnam to the UK in 12 years, on the occasion of the two countries celebrating the 15th anniversary of the establishment of the Strategic Partnership (2010-2025). On the afternoon of October 29, Prime Minister Keir Starmer chaired the welcoming ceremony and held talks with General Secretary Tô Lâm. The two leaders issued a Joint Statement on upgrading the Vietnam-UK relationship to a Comprehensive Strategic Partnership.

== Strategic Partnership ==
A strategic partnership (đối tác chiến lược) is a relationship that is global, key, and has long-term value over time. The relationship involves many areas of mutually beneficial development (win-win relationship) and can include the field of military security. The number of strategic partners of this type is increasing rapidly.

According to Professor Valeri Lotxkin (Russia), "strategic partnership" must include the following contents:

Do not attack each other; do not ally against other countries; not interfere in each other's internal affairs; There must be mutual trust.

For the US, strategic partnership must include close military and security cooperation.

In terms of form, strategic partnerships can be flexible (formal or informal, bilateral or multilateral, broad or narrow scope and level of participation, more or less...) and open because they do not aim for a specific outcome.

Strategic partners around the world:

- China: the country with the most strategic partnerships in the world, with more than 60 partners, including small countries such as Laos, Cambodia, Kazakhstan, Afghanistan. There are also three partners who are international organizations, including the EU, ASEAN and the African Union.
- Russia: more than 40 strategic partners and equivalents.
- United States: 9 strategic partners, 3 comprehensive partners, 2 special relationships with the UK and Israel, 2 non-NATO alliances, 8 other alliances. A total of 24 or more strategic partners or equivalent. France: 13 strategic partners.
- United Kingdom and India: each country has 12 alliances and strategic partnerships.

Currently, Vietnam has 23 countries as strategic partners (12 countries are comprehensive strategic partners), of which 5 partners are key countries in ASEAN, including: Russia (2001); India (2007); China (2008); Japan, South Korea and Spain (2009); United Kingdom (2010); Germany (2011); Italy (January 2013), Thailand (June 2013), Indonesia (June 2013), Singapore (September 2013), France (September 2013); Philippines (2015); Australia (2018); New Zealand (2020) and United States (September 2023); Brazil (November 2024); Czech Republic (January 2025), Kazakhstan (May 2025), Azerbaijan (May 2025), Belarus (May 2025), Finland (21 October 2025), Bulgaria (23 October 2025), Kuwait (18 November 2025), Algeria (19 November 2025), South Africa (21 November 2025), Slovakia (13 April 2026), Canada (24 September 2026).

The list below is based on the year the relationship was upgraded, and does not re-list the comprehensive strategic partnership countries above.

=== Spain ===
During President Nguyễn Minh Triết's visit to Spain in December 2009, the two sides established a "strategic partnership towards the future", affirming their determination to promote multifaceted cooperation between the two countries shortly.

=== Germany ===
During German Chancellor Angela Merkel's visit to Vietnam (October 2011), the Prime Ministers of the two countries signed the Hanoi Joint Declaration on establishing a Strategic Partnership, which set out goals and measures. Specifically, strengthen cooperation in priority areas.

Notably, after the Trinh Xuan Thanh incident, Germany suspended its Strategic Partnership with Vietnam in 2018. However, since 2019, the two sides have made moves to resume their Strategic Partnership, culminating in the official state visit of President Frank-Walter Steinmeier from January 23–24. January 2024. During this visit, the two sides also continued to sign the Action Plan to implement the Strategic Partnership for the two years 2023-2024.

=== Italy ===
During the State visit to Italy from January 20–22, 2013, of General Secretary of the Central Committee of the Communist Party of Vietnam Nguyễn Phú Trọng, the two sides signed a Joint Declaration establishing a strategic partnership between Vietnam and Italy.

=== Philippines ===
On the occasion of attending the 23rd APEC Senior Leaders' Summit and receiving the invitation of President Benigno Aquino, President Trương Tấn Sang visited the Philippines from November 17–19, 2015. On November 17, 2015, President Trương Tấn Sang and President Benigno Aquino signed a Joint Declaration on establishing a strategic partnership between Vietnam and the Philippines.

In June of 2026, the Philippines and Vietnam agreed to elevate their relations to an Enhanced Strategic Partnership.

=== Brazil ===
On the occasion of his visit to South America in May 2007, on May 27, General Secretary Nông Đức Mạnh came to Brazil at the invitation of Brazilian President Luiz Inácio Lula da Silva. On May 29, General Secretary Nông Đức Mạnh met with President Luiz Inácio Lula da Silva, after which the leaders of both sides agreed to upgrade the relationship to a comprehensive partnership.

On November 17, 2024, within the framework of attending the G20 Summit in Rio de Janeiro city, Prime Minister Phạm Minh Chính had a meeting with Brazilian President Luiz Inácio Lula da Silva. The two sides agreed to upgrade the Vietnam-Brazil relationship to a strategic partnership.

=== Czech Republic ===
During the official visit to the Czech Republic from January 18-20, 2025, by Prime Minister Phạm Minh Chính at the invitation of his counterpart, Prime Minister Petr Fiala, on the occasion of the 75th anniversary of the establishment of diplomatic relations, the two sides issued a statement upgrading bilateral relations to the level of "Strategic Partnership". This also marks Vietnam as the first Southeast Asian country to be a Strategic Partner of the Czech Republic, and the Czech Republic is also the first Central Eastern European country in the EU to have a strategic relationship with Vietnam.

=== Kazakhstan ===
On the afternoon of May 6, 2025, at the meeting between General Secretary Tô Lâm and President Kassym-Jomart Tokayev during General Secretary Tô Lâm official visit to Kazakhstan, the two sides agreed to upgrade bilateral relations to a strategic partnership. This also marked Kazakhstan as Vietnam's first strategic partner in the Central Asian region.

=== Azerbaijan ===
On the afternoon of May 7, 2025, General Secretary Tô Lâm had an official meeting with President Ilham Aliyev during General Secretary Tô Lâm official visit to Azerbaijan. After the meeting, General Secretary Tô Lâm and President Ilham Aliyev witnessed the handover of cooperation documents and the adoption of the Joint Statement on the establishment of the Vietnam - Azerbaijan Strategic Partnership, demonstrating the rich and comprehensive achievements that the two sides achieved during this visit. Azerbaijan is one of the first two countries with which Vietnam established high-level relations in the CIS region, along with the Strategic Partnership with Kazakhstan established 1 day earlier.

=== Belarus ===
Also during his visit to four countries of the former Soviet Union and to attend the 80th anniversary of the victory over fascism in the Russian Federation, on May 12, 2025, General Secretary Tô Lâm visited Belarus and had an official meeting with President Alexander Lukashenko. At the meeting, the two sides agreed to upgrade their relationship to a Strategic Partnership, while continuing to effectively implement and maximize the benefits of the Free Trade Agreement between Vietnam and the Eurasian Economic Union (EAEU). Belarus is the second country with which Vietnam established a Strategic Partnership in Eastern Europe, after the Czech Republic in January of the same year.

=== Finland ===
On October 21, 2025, during the official visit of General Secretary Tô Lâm to Finland at the invitation of President Alexander Stubb, the two sides issued a Joint Statement on the establishment of a Strategic Partnership between Vietnam and Finland with cooperation in the fields of politics, trade and economy, science and technology, education and training as well as energy and environment,...

=== Bulgaria ===
During the official visit of General Secretary Tô Lâm to Bulgaria from October 22-24 at the invitation of President Rumen Radev to celebrate the 75th anniversary of diplomatic relations, the two sides issued a joint statement on the agreement to establish a Strategic Partnership between the two countries.

=== Canada ===
During the official visit to Vietnam by Canadian Prime Minister Justin Trudeau from November 8 to 10, 2017, on the occasion of attending the 2017 APEC Summit Week in Da Nang, on November 8, the two sides issued a statement "establishing a comprehensive partnership framework".

At the invitation of the Governor General of Canada Louise Arbour, the General Secretary and President Tô Lâm paid a State visit to Canada from September 24 to 25, 2026. This was the first official visit to Canada of a General Secretary of the Communist Party of Vietnam since the establishment of diplomatic relations between the two countries in 1973, marking a historic milestone in Viet Nam - Canada relations. On September 24, 2026, the General Secretary of Vietnam, Tô Lâm, concluded his meetings with the Prime Minister Mark Carney, that Canada has elevated his status into a ''Strategic Partnership''.

== Comprehensive partner ==
A comprehensive partnership (đối tác toàn diện) is a normal relationship between subjects that have one or several aspects that have reached a strategic level, but there is no equality between the aspects of cooperation. Because mutual trust is not enough or the time is not yet ripe, the subjects choose to build a comprehensive partnership framework with the implication of emphasizing cooperation, continuing to strengthen trust, and working towards the future.

By 2025, Vietnam has established comprehensive partnerships with 15 countries: South Africa (2004); Chile and Venezuela (2007); Argentina (2010); Ukraine (2011); Denmark (2013); Myanmar (2017); Hungary (2018); Brunei and Netherlands (2019); Mongolia (September 2024) and UAE (October 2024); Switzerland (January 2025), Egypt (August 2025). The list below is listed by year of relationship upgrade.

=== South Africa ===
From November 22–25, 2004, Prime Minister Phan Văn Khải paid an official visit to South Africa during a trip to three countries: Algeria, Morocco, and South Africa. On this occasion, the two sides signed "Joint Declaration on Partnership for Cooperation and Development", "Agreement to establish the Intergovernmental Partnership Forum for economic, trade, cultural, scientific and technical cooperation," "Agreement to establish a joint trade committee," and "Cooperation agreement between the two Chambers of Commerce and Industry".

=== Argentina ===
On April 16, 2010, after the official welcoming ceremony was solemnly held at La Rosada Presidential Palace in Buenos Aires, Prime Minister Nguyễn Tấn Dũng held talks with Argentine President Cristina Fernandez de Kirchner. During the press conference after the talks, the two sides agreed to upgrade to a comprehensive partnership.

=== Ukraine ===
In March 2011, the President of Ukraine, Viktor Yanukovych, paid a state visit to Vietnam. During the visit, both sides agreed on the great prospects of developing cooperative relations and a comprehensive partnership between Vietnam and Ukraine.

=== Denmark ===
During Crown Prince Frederik's visit to Vietnam, from November 27 to December 1, 2011, at a meeting with Prime Minister Nguyen Tan Dung, the two countries signed a Vietnam-Denmark Joint Declaration on establishing relations. Strategic partner in the fields of climate change, environment, energy, and green growth.

September 19, 2013, in Copenhagen, Denmark. President Trương Tấn Sang had talks with Danish Prime Minister Helle Thorning-Schmidt. The two leaders agreed to upgrade the relationship between the two countries from a strategic partnership in some areas to a comprehensive partnership.

=== Myanmar ===
On August 24, 2017, in Naypyidaw, Myanmar, General Secretary Nguyễn Phú Trọng had an intimate meeting with Myanmar President Htin Kyaw. After the meeting, the two leaders held talks in which the two sides agreed to establish a framework of "Comprehensive Partnership and Cooperation" between the Socialist Republic of Vietnam and the Republic of the Union of Myanmar.

=== Hungary ===
On September 10, 2018, in Budapest, Hungary, General Secretary Nguyễn Phú Trọng and Hungarian Prime Minister Viktor Orbán agreed to raise the framework of the two countries' relationship to "Comprehensive Partnership".

=== Brunei ===
On March 27, 2019, on the occasion of the State visit of Brunei Sultan Hassanal Bolkiah, in a meeting with General Secretary - President Nguyễn Phú Trọng, the two sides issued a Joint Statement upgrading foreign relations. Between the two parties to the level of a Comprehensive Partnership.

=== Netherlands ===
On the sidelines of the 8th Asia-Europe Summit in Brussels, Belgium, Vietnamese Prime Minister Nguyễn Tấn Dũng and Dutch Prime Minister Jan Peter Balkenende, on October 4, 2010, signed a Strategic Partnership Agreement in Water Management and Applications, which deals with climate change, bringing bilateral cooperation in this field to the highest level.

During Prime Minister Mark Rutte's visit to Vietnam on June 16, 2014, Vietnam and the Netherlands officially established a Strategic Partnership mechanism on Agriculture and Food Security.

April 9, 2019, during the official visit of Dutch Prime Minister Mark Rutte at the invitation of Vietnam. After the talks between the two leaders, Prime Minister Nguyễn Xuân Phúc and Prime Minister Mark Rutte, the two sides issued an announcement agreeing to build a comprehensive partnership with the desire to deepen cooperation between the two countries.

=== Mongolia ===
On September 30, 2024, on the occasion of the State visit of General Secretary - President Tô Lâm at the invitation of Mongolian President Ukhnaagiin Khurelsukh from September 30 - October 1, the two sides issued a Joint Statement on the establishment of a Comprehensive Partnership to orient the deep, trusting cooperation between the two countries in all fields to become increasingly in-depth, substantive, effective and comprehensive.

=== United Arab Emirates ===
On October 28, 2024, on the occasion of Prime Minister Phạm Minh Chính visit to the UAE at the invitation of President Mohamed bin Zayed Al Nahyan, the two sides agreed on 6 priority focuses of cooperation between the two countries, and at the same time agreed to enhance the level of the relationship to Comprehensive Partner. Thereby also marking the UAE as Vietnam's first Comprehensive Partner in the Middle East region.

=== Switzerland ===
On January 21, 2025, during his visit to Davos to attend the World Economic Forum Annual Meeting, Prime Minister Phạm Minh Chính held talks with President Karin Keller-Sutter. The two sides agreed to issue a joint statement on upgrading relations to a Comprehensive Partnership framework; at the same time, they committed to promoting the early completion of the Free Trade Agreement between Vietnam and the EFTA bloc.

=== Egypt ===
On the afternoon of August 5, 2025, during the state visit of President Lương Cường to Egypt at the invitation of President Abdel Fattah el-Sisi from August 3-6 on the occasion of the 60th anniversary of cooperation, the two sides agreed to upgrade bilateral relations to Comprehensive Partnership to better exploit each other's potential, especially in the fields of agriculture, industry, trade and investment. Egypt is also the first country in the North African region to have a high-level partnership with Vietnam.

== Field strategic partner ==
A field strategic partnership is a cooperation in a certain field in which both countries have mutual trust. But that cooperation is only in that field and does not extend to other industries and specialties.
