= United Kingdom–Vietnam Free Trade Agreement =

Free Trade Agreement between the United Kingdom and the Socialist Republic of Vietnam
- United Kingdom Vietnam
- Type: Free Trade Agreement and Economic Integration Agreement
- Context: Trade continuity agreement between the United Kingdom and Vietnam
- Signed: 29 December 2020
- Location: Hanoi, Vietnam
- Effective: 1 January 2021
- Condition: Ratification by all signatories
- Negotiators: Liz Truss; Trần Tuấn Anh
- Parties: United Kingdom; Vietnam
- Languages: English; Vietnamese

The United Kingdom–Vietnam Free Trade Agreement (UKVFTA) is a free trade agreement between the United Kingdom and Vietnam. It was signed prior to the withdrawal of the United Kingdom of the European Union as a Continuity trade agreement in order to protect trade and investment between the two parties as the UK would no longer be a party of the European Union–Vietnam Free Trade Agreement.

The agreement replicates the European Union–Vietnam FTA terms with minor changes.

Trade value between the United Kingdom and Vietnam was worth £7,057 million in 2022.

== See also ==
- Economy of the United Kingdom
- Economy of Vietnam
- Free trade agreements of the United Kingdom
- Free trade agreements of Vietnam
