= European Union–Vietnam Free Trade Agreement =

International treaty

EU–Vietnam Free Trade Agreement
Free Trade Agreement between the European Union and the Socialist Republic of Viet Nam
- Vietnam European Union (EU)
- Type: Free trade agreement
- Signed: 30 June 2019
- Location: Hanoi, Vietnam
- Effective: 1 August 2020
- Condition: Approval by all signatories
- Parties: Vietnam; European Union
- Depositaries: EU; VN
- Languages: Vietnamese and all official EU languages

The EU–Vietnam Free Trade Agreement (EVFTA) is a free trade agreement between the European Union (EU) and the Socialist Republic of Vietnam. The EU-Vietnam Investment Protection Agreement (EVIPA) was also agreed which is a bilateral investment treaty.

The agreement deepens the Vietnam–European Union relations and was adopted by Council Decision (EU) 2020/753 of March 30, 2020 on the conclusion of the free trade agreement between the EU and Vietnam. The agreement was passed in Vietnam on June 8, 2020, in the Vietnamese National Assembly and entered into force on August 1 of that year. Both agreements were approved by Vietnam's lawmakers with a large majority of around 95% of the vote.

According to the European Commission, the agreements will provide opportunities to increase trade and support jobs and growth on both sides, through

- Eliminating 99% of all tariffs
- Reducing regulatory barriers and overlapping red tape
- Ensuring protection of geographical indications
- Opening up services and public procurement markets
- Making sure the agreed rules are enforceable

== See also ==
- Vietnam–European Union relations
- United Kingdom–Vietnam Free Trade Agreement: a similar free trade agreement between the UK and Vietnam. It is largely derived from EVFTA with minor modifications and was made to continue the rights and obligations between the two countries after Brexit.
- European Union free trade agreements
