= List of Brooklyn College alumni =

This is a list of alumni of Brooklyn College, a senior college of the City University of New York, located in Brooklyn, New York, United States.

== Academia ==
=== Chancellors, presidents, and academic administrators ===
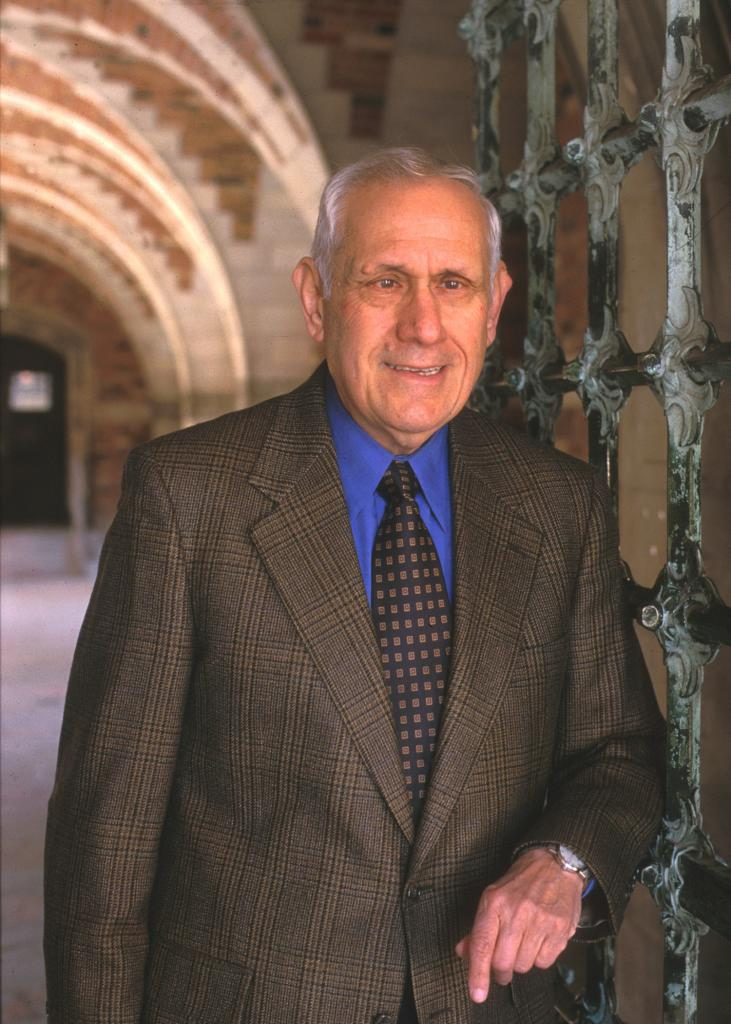
Donald Kagan

- Walter Adams (B.A. 1942), economist and president of Michigan State University
- Glenn Altschuler (B.A. 1971), dean of the Cornell University School of Continuing Education and Summer Sessions, noted for his work on the history of American popular culture
- Samuel Baskin (B.A. 1942), psychologist and educational reformer and first President of the Union Institute & University
- Barbara Aronstein Black (B.A. 1953), dean at Columbia Law School
- Carmen Fariña (M.S.Ed. 1968), New York City Schools chancellor
- Leon M. Goldstein (died 1999), president of Kingsborough Community College, and acting chancellor of the City University of New York
- Alfred Gottschalk (B.A. 1952), president of Hebrew Union College and leader in the Reform Judaism movement
- Donald Kagan (B.A. 1954), historian; dean at Yale University
- Barry Munitz (B.A. 1963), chancellor, California State University (1991–98)
- Steven Schwartz (B.A. 1967), vice chancellor of Macquarie University in Sydney, Australia
- Lisa Staiano-Coico, aka Lisa S. Coico (B.S. 1976), president of City College of New York
- Robert S. Stone (B.A. 1942), pioneering pathologist; dean of the University of New Mexico School of Medicine, University of Oregon School of Medicine, and Texas A&M Health Science Center College of Medicine; director of The National Institutes of Health 1973–1975
- Robert H. Tamarin (B.A. 1963), former dean of the College of Sciences at the University of Massachusetts; emeritus professor of biology, developed radioisotope, electrophoretic and DNA fingerprinting techniques for use in the study of small mammals
- Frank P. Tomasulo (B.A. 1967), academic administrator at Ithaca College, Georgia State University, Southern Methodist University, and Florida State University; film professor, editor-in-chief of Journal of Film & Video and Cinema Journal
- Robert Ubell (B.A. 1961), former vice dean of Online Learning at New York University Tandon School of Engineering, and noted science publisher (Nature), and innovator in the field of on-line education
- Donald P. Zingale (B.A. 1967), president of the State University of New York at Cobleskill

=== Anthropology ===
- Jerome H. Barkow (B.A. 1964), Canadian anthropologist at Dalhousie University, has made important contributions to the field of evolutionary psychology
- Barbara Joans (B.A. 1956), anthropologist who researched biker culture
- Melvin Konner (B.A. 1966), Samuel Candler Dobbs Professor of Anthropology and associate professor of Psychiatry and Neurology at Emory University
- Jeffrey Laitman (B.A. 1973), anatomist and physical anthropologist, Distinguished Professor of the Mount Sinai School of Medicine, president of the American Association for Anatomy, 2011–2013
- Sidney Mintz (B.A. 1943), anthropologist, known for his studies of Latin America and the Caribbean
- Fredy Peccerelli (B.S. 1996), forensic anthropologist, director of the Guatemalan Forensic Anthropology Foundation
- Marjorie Shostak (B.A. 1966), anthropologist; specialist in the !Kung San people of the Kalahari Desert in south-western Africa
- Richard J. Smith (B.A. 1969), Ralph E. Morrow Distinguished Professor of Physical Anthropology at Washington University in St. Louis
- Michel-Rolph Trouillot (B.A. 1979), Haitian American academic, anthropologist and Professor of Anthropology and of Social Sciences at the University of Chicago

=== Biochemistry and chemistry ===
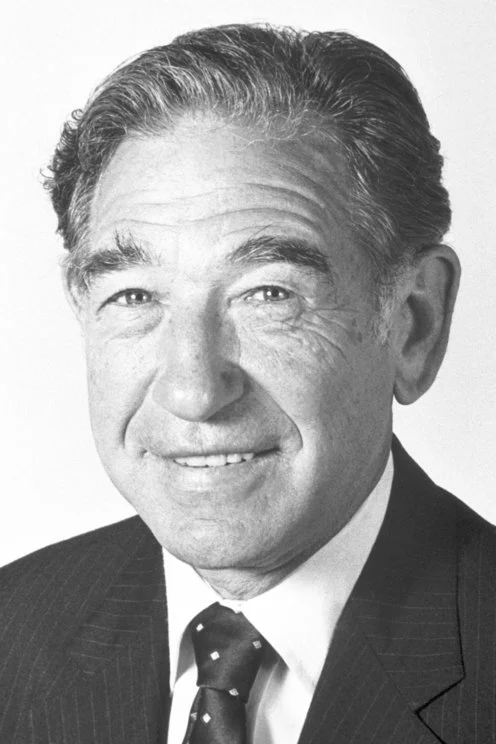
Stanley Cohen

- Bruce J. Berne (B.S 1961), American chemist important in theoretical chemistry, statistical mechanics, computer simulation, and biophysical chemistry
- Paul Brumer (B.A. 1966), professor of chemistry at the University of Toronto, known for his work in theoretical chemical physics
- Stanley Cohen (B.A. 1943), biochemist and Nobel laureate (Physiology or Medicine, 1986)
- Kenneth B. Eisenthal (B.A. 1954), Mark Hyman Professor of Chemistry Chair at Columbia University and pioneering physical chemist
- Aryeh Frimer (B.A. 1968), Professor of Chemistry at Bar-Ilan University
- Martha Greenblatt (B.S. 1962), chemist at Rutgers University, received the 2003 American Chemical Society's Garvan-Olin Medal
- Arthur R. Grossman (B.S. 1973), biologist whose research ranges across plant biology, microbiology, marine biology, phytochemistry, and photosynthesis
- Alan Lambowitz (B.S. 1968), professor in Molecular Biosciences and Oncology at the University of Texas at Austin, pioneer of bio-molecular processes and concepts, such as intron splicing
- Jerry March (M.S. 1953), chemist and author of March's Advanced Organic Chemistry
- Arthur Nowick (B.A. 1943), materials scientist
- Alexander H. Popkin (B.S. 1934), scientist and prolific inventor, developed synthetic lubricant for car and truck engines and Esso Extra Gasoline, containing a detergent additive advertisers claimed "Put a Tiger in Your Tank"
- Miriam Rafailovich (B.S. 1974), American materials engineering researcher; director of the Garcia Materials Research Science and Engineering Center at Stony Brook University
- Stuart A. Rice (B.S. 1952), physical chemist, Frank P. Hixon Distinguished Service Professor Emeritus at the University of Chicago, Wolf Prize in Chemistry
- Robert Rosen (B.A. 1955), theoretical biologist and professor of Biophysics at Dalhousie University
- Barnett Rosenberg (B.S. 1948), chemist, known for his discovery of the anti-cancer drug cisplatin
- Howard Sachs (B.S. 1949), biochemist; pioneer the study of neuroendocrinology
- Nicholas Sand (B.A. 1966), clandestine chemist and early proponent of psychedelics
- Seymour Shapiro (B.S. 1935), organic chemist, known for his pioneering work on a class of drugs used to treat symptoms of adult-onset diabetes
- Karen Joy Shaw (B.S. 1976), microbiologist and discoverer of novel antifungal and antibacterial compounds
- Harry Wiener (B.S. 1945) chemist, physician and psychologist, and pioneer in cheminformatics and chemical graph theory

=== Biological sciences, medicine, and epidemiology ===
- Annette Aiello (B.A. 1972), entomologist at the Smithsonian Tropical Research Institute; specialist in butterflies
- Samuel Ajl (B.A. 1945), microbiologist and biochemist; expert in microbial toxins
- Seymour Benzer (B.A. 1942), physicist, molecular biologist and behavioral geneticist
- Baruch Brody (B.A. 1962), bioethicist and director of the Center for Ethics, Medicine and Public Issues at the Baylor College of Medicine and professor of philosophy at Rice University
- Wylie Burke (B.A. 1970), bioethicist and professor emerita at the University of Washington, authority on the translation of novel genomic technologies
- Florence Comite (B.A. 1973), endocrinologist who has developed therapies for osteoporosis, endometriosis, fibroid disease, and infertility
- Eli Friedman (B.S. 1953), nephrologist, inventor of the first portable dialysis machine
- William Martin Gelbart (B.S. 1966), geneticist at Harvard University best known for his work with fly genetics, the discovery of decapentaplegic (dpp), and the formation of Flybase
- Henry N. Ginsberg (B.S. 1966), Irving Professor of Medicine at Columbia University; expert on lipids, heart disease, and stroke
- Leon Glass (B.S. 1963), scientist; pioneered mathematical and physical methods to study biological systems, with special interest in vision, cardiac arrhythmia, and genetic networks
- Aaron Goldberg (B.A. 1939), botanist; parasitologist; known for the Goldberg system, a treatise on the classification, evolution and phylogeny of the Monocotyledon and Dicotyledons
- Marc Goldstein (B.S. 1968), urologist and the Matthew P. Hardy Distinguished Professor of Reproductive Medicine, and Urology at Weill Cornell Medical College of Cornell University
- Jay M. Gould (B.A. 1936), statistician and epidemiologist, founded the Radiation and Public Health Project
- Madelyn Gould (B.A. 1972), Irving Philips Professor of Epidemiology in Psychiatry at Columbia University, notable for her study of youth suicide
- Leonard Herzenberg (B.S. 1952), developed the fluorescence-activated cell sorter which revolutionized the study of cancer cells and is the basis for purification of adult stem cells; recipient of the Kyoto Prize in 2006
- Gerald Imber (B.A. 1962), plastic surgeon, skincare-company founder, and author
- Howard W. Jaffe (B.A. 1942), geologist and mineralogist; a pioneer in the study of the crystal chemistry of rock-forming minerals
- Edith Kaplan (B.A. 1949), creator of several important neuropsychological tests, including the Boston Diagnostic Aphasia Examination and the Boston Naming Test
- Selna Kaplan (B.S. 1948), pediatric endocrinologist
- Leslie Libow (B.A. 1954), professor of geriatrics and palliative medicine at the Icahn Mount Sinai School of Medicine, author of one of the first geriatric-medicine textbooks in the United States
- Robert I. Misbin (B.S. 1967), physician and author; longtime employee and later critic of the Food and Drug Administration
- William E. Paul (B.A. 1956), immunologist and co-discoverer of interleukin 4
- Flora G. Pollack (B.A. 1940), mycologist at the United States Department of Agriculture and the American Type Culture Collection, best known for her work enhancing fungal preservation protocols and describing coelomycetous fungal species
- Estelle Ramey (B.A. 1936), endocrinologist, physiologist, and feminist
- Buddy Ratner (B.S. 1967), professor of chemical engineering and bioengineering and director of the Research Center for Biomaterials at the University of Washington
- Michael Salzhauer (B.A. 1993), cosmetic and plastic surgeon, author and inventor
- Joseph D. Schulman (B.S. 1962), specialist in human genetics and infertility; founder the Genetics & IVF Institute
- Debra T. Silverman (B.A. 1970), biostatistician and epidemiologist specializing in bladder cancer epidemiology and the carcinogenicity of diesel exhaust
- Dennis P. Tarnow (B.A. 1968), dentist and pioneer in implant research
- Edward Taub (B.S. 1953), behavioral neuroscientist on faculty at the University of Alabama at Birmingham
- Armin Tehrany (B.A. 1991), orthopaedic surgeon and film producer
- Jay Tischfield (B.A. 1967), MacMillan Professor and the Chair of the Department of Genetics at Rutgers University
- Wolf V. Vishniac (B.A. 1945), microbiologist; inventor of the "Wolf Trap," which tests for the possibility of life existing on other planets; namesake of the crater
- Michael Weitzman (B.A. 1968), pediatrician specializing in public health and policy including groundbreaking research on lead poisoned children, prenatal tobacco and childhood secondhand smoke exposure, and childhood nutrition and obesity

=== Computer science ===
- Martin Goetz (B.A. 1953), pioneer in the development of the commercial software industry; holds the first U.S. software patent
- Ellis Horowitz (B.S. 1964), computer scientist and professor of computer science and electrical engineering at the University of Southern California (USC)
- Lawrence Landweber (B.S. 1963), Internet pioneer, helped develop CSNET, founding member and president of the Internet Society
- Jack Minker (B.S. 1949), authority in artificial intelligence, deductive databases, logic programming and non-monotonic reasoning
- George Radin (B.A. 1951) computer scientist, helped develop the PL/I programming language and design the OS/360 and TSS/360 systems
- Gerard Salton (B.S. 1950), pioneering computer scientist in the field of information retrieval
- Salvatore J. Stolfo (B.S. 1974), professor of computer science at Columbia University and an expert in computer security
- Joan Targ (B.A. 1960), pioneer in computer education and older sister of chess champion Bobby Fischer

=== Economics ===
- Zvi Bodie (B.A. 1965), economist, Boston University Norman and Adele Barron Professor of Management and expert in pension finance
- Barry Chiswick, (B.A. 1962) born in 1942, American economist who has done extensive research on labor economics, human resources and income distribution
- Paul Davidson (B.S. 1950), macroeconomist who has been one of the leading spokesmen of the American branch of the Post Keynesian school in economics
- Israel Kirzner (B.A. 1954), economist
- David Laibman (M.A. 1969), professor emeritus of Economics at Brooklyn College; Editor of Science & Society
- Leonard Mirman (B.A. 1963), mathematician and economist at the University of Virginia, known for his contributions to economics of uncertainty
- Richard Scheffler (M.A. 1967), Distinguished Professor of Health Economics and Public Policy at the University of California, Berkeley (UC Berkeley) in the Graduate School of Public Health, his research focuses on applying health economics to public policy both nationally and globally

=== Education and librarianship ===
- Gwyndolen Clarke-Reed (B.S. 1973), educator and representative for District 92 of the Florida House of Representatives
- Alfred Giardino (B.A. 1934), prominent New York lawyer; president of the New York City Board of Education and chairman of the New York City Board of Higher Education
- Roberta Michnick Golinkoff (B.A. 1968), the Unidel H. Rodney Sharp Chair in the School of Education at the University of Delaware and is also a member of the Departments of Psychological and Brain Sciences and Linguistics and Cognitive Science
- Zoia Horn (B.A. 1939), first librarian ever jailed for refusing to divulge information that violated her belief in intellectual freedom
- Martin Haberman (B.A. 1953), educator and Distinguished Professor at the University of Wisconsin–Milwaukee, developed interviewing techniques for identifying teachers and principals who will be successful in working with poor children

=== Geology and planetary science/astronomy ===
- John Castagna (B.S. 1976, M.A. 1980); geophysicist, known for the Mudrock line, currently the Margaret S. and Robert E. Sheriff Endowed Faculty Chair in Applied Seismology at the University of Houston
- Doris Malkin Curtis (B.S. 1933), paleontologist, stratigrapher, geologist and first female president of the Geological Society of America
- Sol Katz (B.A. 1978), geologist, computer scientist, and early pioneer of Geospatial Free and Open Source Software
- Joel S. Levine (B.S. 1964), planetary scientist at NASA, author, and research professor in applied science at the College of William & Mary
- Stephen P. Maran (B.S. 1959), astronomer and popularizer; author of Astronomy for Dummies
- George Plafker (B.A. 1949), geologist and seismologist, known for pioneering research in subduction, tsunami, and the geology of Alaska
- Isaac Winograd (B.S. 1953), geologist and senior scientist with the U.S. Geological Survey, best known for advocating for Yucca Mountain as a long-term storage site for nuclear waste

=== History ===
- Frank J. Coppa (B.A. 1960), historian, author, and educator who has written widely on the papacy
- Michael S. Cullen (B.A. 1962), historian, journalist and publicist, based in Berlin; credited with inspiring Christo and Jeanne-Claude to wrap the Reichstag
- Jules Davids (B.A. 1942), Professor of Diplomatic History at Georgetown University, aided John F. Kennedy in writing Profiles in Courage
- Hal Draper (B.A. 1934), socialist activist and author who played a significant role in the Berkeley, California, Free Speech Movement
- Theodore Draper (B.A. 1933), historian and political writer; wrote seminal works on the formative period of the American Communist Party, Cuban Revolution, and Iran-Contra Affair
- Melvyn Dubofsky (B.A. 1955), professor of history and sociology at the Binghamton University, and a well-known labor historian
- Yaffa Eliach (B.A. 1967), historian, author, and scholar of Judaic Studies and the Holocaust
- John A. Garraty (B.A. 1941), historian, biographer, and president of the Society of American Historians
- Eugene Genovese (B.A. 1953), historian of the American South and American slavery
- Stuart D. Goldman (B.A. 1964), historian, author, and scholar in residence at the National Council for Eurasian and East European Research at the Wilson Center in Washington, DC
- Judith R. Goodstein (B.A. 1960), historian of science, historian of mathematics, book author, and University Archivist Emeritus at the California Institute of Technology
- Greg Grandin (B.A. 1991), historian; professor of history at New York University; winner of the 2020 Pulitzer Prize for History
- Charles J. Halperin (B.A. 1967), historian specializing in the political and military history of late Kievan Rus', the Golden Horde, and early Muscovy
- Oscar Handlin (B.A. 1934), Carl M. Loeb University Professor Emeritus, Harvard University; winner of the Pulitzer Prize in history, author
- Linda Heywood (B. A. 1973), professor of African American studies and history at the University of Boston
- Raul Hilberg (B.A. 1948), Austrian-born American political scientist and historian, author of The Destruction of the European Jews (1961)
- Gertrude Himmelfarb (B.A. 1942), historian and conservative cultural critic
- Elisheva Carlebach Jofen (B.A. 1976), scholar of early modern Jewish history
- Thomas Kessner (B.A. 1963), American historian, Distinguished Professor at City University of New York, specializing in social history and the history of New York City
- Gerd Korman (B.A. 1951), Professor Emeritus at Cornell University, specializing in labor history and Holocaust studiesw
- Aileen S. Kraditor (B.A. 1950), American historian, specializing in the history of feminism
- David Kranzler (B.A. 1953), librarian and historian specializing in the rescue of Jews during the Holocaust
- Shnayer Leiman (B.A. 1964)), scholar specializing in Jewish studies, known as the "Sherlock Holmes of Jewish History"
- John Mahon (B.A. 1952), historian, author of New York's Fighting 69th
- John Parascandola (B.A. 1963), medical historian
- Moses Rischin (B.A. 1947), Jewish historian and Emeritus Professor of History at San Francisco State University
- Michele R. Salzman (B.A. 1973), classicist at the University of California, Riverside, scholar of the religious and social history of late antiquity
- Lillian Schlissel (B.A. 1951), American historian, professor and author, specializing in narratives from the Old West
- Albert A. Sicroff (B.A. 1940), Hispanist, Professor of Spanish, Queens College
- Joel H. Silbey (B.A. 1955), historian and President White Professor of History at Cornell University
- Richard Slotkin (B.A. 1963), cultural critic and historian of the Western United States
- Clarence Taylor (B.A. 1975), professor emeritus of History at Baruch College and author of books on racism, religion, and civil rights in 20th-century America

=== Law ===
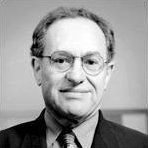
Alan Dershowitz

- Alan S. Becker (B.A. 1966), attorney, member of the Florida House of Representatives, 1972–1978
- Alan M. Dershowitz (B.A. 1959), Harvard Law School professor and author
- Stephen Gillers (B.A. 1964), New York University School of Law professor and expert in legal ethics
- Gerald Gunther (A.B. 1949), William Nelson Cromwell Professor of Law at Stanford Law School, among the 20 most widely cited legal scholars of the 20th century
- Mary Noe (B.A. 1982), educator; writer; lecturer; assistant professor of Law, division of Criminal Justice and Legal Studies, St. John's University
- Bruce Winick (B.A. 1965), the Silvers-Rubenstein Distinguished Professor of Law and professor of Psychiatry and Behavioral Sciences at the University of Miami and theorist on mental health law

=== Literary scholarship (English and other languages; translation of literary works) ===
- Joyce Sparer Adler (B.A. 1935), critic, playwright, teacher and Melville scholar
- William Alfred (B.A. 1948), playwright and professor of English literature at Harvard University
- Evelyn Torton Beck (B.A. 1954), comparative literature, Yiddish scholar, and eventually activist, Jewish Women's studies and Lesbian Studies
- Betty T. Bennett (B.A. 1962), scholar on the life of Frankenstein author Mary Wollstonecraft Shelley, Distinguished Professor of Literature and dean of the College of Arts and Sciences at American University
- Livia Bitton-Jackson (B.A. 1961), academic, author, and Holocaust survivor
- Eva Brann (B.A. 1950), longest-serving tutor (1957–present) at St. John's College, Annapolis and a 2005 recipient of the National Humanities Medal
- Anatole Broyard (attended 1937–41, did not graduate), writer, literary critic and editor for The New York Times
- Jules Chametzky (B.A. 1950), literary critic, writer, editor, and unionist
- Jonathan Chaves (B.A. 1965), professor of Chinese Language and Literature at the George Washington University and translator of classical Chinese poetry
- Rose Leiman Goldemberg (B.A. 1949), playwright, screenwriter, poet, and biographer of Sylvia Plath, Sophie Tucker and Molly Picon; best known for the TV movie The Burning Bed (1984)
- Dinah Hawken (M.F.A. 1987), New Zealand poet, teacher, physiotherapist and social worker; received the Prime Minister's Award for Literary Achievement in 2025
- Michelle Herman (B.A. 1976), writer and professor of English at Ohio State University, and director of the M.F.A. Program in Creative Writing
- Stanley Hochman (B.A. 1949), editor and translator of Émile Zola, Jules Renard, Vitaliano Brancati and Simone Signoret among others
- Paul Ilie (B.A. 1954), specialist in modern and contemporary Spanish literature
- Eva Kollisch (B.A. 1951), writer, literary scholar, pacifist and feminist
- Annette Kolodny (B.A. 1962), feminist literary critic and activist
- Joseph Natoli (B.A. 1966), academic, known for works on postmodernism
- Gerald J. Prince (B.A. 1963), academic and literary theoretician at the University of Pennsylvania and leading scholar of narrative poetics; shaped the discipline of narratology
- Patrice Rankine (B.A. 1992), professor of Classics at the University of Chicago and leading scholar in the area of classical reception
- Jack M. Sasson (B.A. 1962), emeritus Mary Jane Werthan Professor of Jewish Studies and Hebrew Bible at Vanderbilt Divinity School whose research focuses primarily on Assyriology and Hebrew Scriptures
- Ivan Schulman (B.A. 1953), major scholar of Spanish American Modernismo and the leading US scholar of the works of José Martí
- Naomi Seidman (B.A. 1981), Yiddish scholar; Chancellor Jackman Professor in the Arts at the University of Toronto; previously Koret Professor of Jewish Culture at the Graduate Theological Union in Berkeley; leading scholar of the Bais Yaakov movement in women's education
- Augusta Strong North (B.A. 1934), Marxist writer, linguist and teacher of Black literature
- Regina Weinreich (B.A. 1970), writer, journalist, teacher, and scholar of the artists of the Beat Generation
- Rose Zimbardo (B.A., 1956), professor of English literature
- Feenie Ziner (B.A. 1941), professor at the University of Connecticut; children's literature writer

=== Mathematics ===
- Milton Abramowitz (B.A. 1940, M.S. 1942), mathematician, co-author of the Handbook of Mathematical Functions with Formulas, Graphs, and Mathematical Tables (1964)
- Ruth Aaronson Bari (B.A. 1939), mathematician known for her work in graph theory and homomorphisms
- Anatole Beck (B.A. 1951), mathematician, known for his linear search problem
- Richard Bellman (B.A. 1941), applied mathematician and inventor of dynamic programming
- Paul Cohen (1953), winner of the Fields Medal
- Sol Garfunkel (B.A. 1963), mathematician and long-time executive director of the Consortium for Mathematics and Its Applications
- Edna Grossman (B.S. 1968), mathematician
- Violet Haas (B.A. 1947), applied mathematician specializing in control theory and optimal estimation; professor of electrical engineering at Purdue
- Frank Harary (B.A. 1941, M.A. 1945), mathematician, specializing in graph theory
- William Kantor (B.S. 1964), mathematician, specializing in group theory and geometry
- Julian Keilson (B.S. 1947), mathematician, known for his work in probability theory
- Eleanor Krawitz Kolchin (B.A. 1947), mathematician and computer programmer at Watson Scientific Computing Laboratory at Columbia University; led work that calculated the orbit of planets, phases of the moon, and trajectories of asteroids using IBM tabulating machines
- Elaine Koppelman (B.A. 1957), mathematician; James Beall Professor of Mathematics at Goucher College
- Seymour Lipschutz (B.A. 1952, M.A., 1956), author of technical books on pure mathematics and probability, including a collection of Schaum's Outlines
- Edith H. Luchins (B.A. 1942), a mathematician and researcher in gestalt psychology; first female professor at the Rensselaer Polytechnic Institute
- Nancy Lynch (B.A. 1968), mathematician and professor at the Massachusetts Institute of Technology; winner of the 2007 Knuth Prize for contributions to the foundations of computer science
- Abraham Nemeth (B.S. 1940), mathematician and inventor; developed the Nemeth Braille Code for Mathematics and Science Notation
- Gloria Olive (B.A. 1944), New Zealand academic mathematician
- Stanley Osher (B.A. 1962), pioneering mathematician in applied mathematics, computational science, and scientific computing
- Allen R Miller (B.S. 1965), mathematician and major contributor to the field of special functions, especially confluent hypergeometric functions
- Teri Perl (B.A. 1947), mathematics educator, co-founder of The Learning Company, pioneering educational software publisher
- Richard M. Pollack (B.A. 1956), geometer and professor emeritus at the Courant Institute of New York University; founding co-editor of the journal Discrete and Computational Geometry
- Irving Reiner (B.A. 1944), mathematician, dealt with representation theory of algebras and groups, and number theory
- Theodore J. Rivlin (B.A. 1948), mathematician, specializing in approximation theory
- Donald Solitar (B.A. 1953), American/Canadian mathematician, known for his work in combinatorial group theory
- Steven Sperber (B.A. 1966), mathematician, professor at the University of Minnesota, noted for work in on arithmetic algebraic geometry, p-adic differential equations, and their applications in advanced number theory and mathematical structures
- Murray R. Spiegel (B. A. 1943), author of textbooks on mathematics, including titles in a collection of Schaum's Outlines
- Henry Wallman (B.S. 1933), mathematician, known for his work in lattice theory, dimension theory, topology, and electronic circuit design
- Gerard Washnitzer (B.S. 1947), mathematician

=== Meteorology ===
- Frank Field (B.S. 1947), meteorologist and science editor
- Seymour Hess (B.A. 1941), meteorologist and planetary scientist
- Lester Machta (B.A. 1939), meteorologist, first director of the Air Resources Laboratory (ARL) of the National Oceanic and Atmospheric Administration
- Raphael Miranda (B.S. 2006), meteorologist and weather producer at WNBC in New York City

=== Philosophy ===
- Jules Coleman (B.A. 1968), scholar of the philosophy of law and jurisprudence and the Wesley Newcomb Hohfeld Professor of Jurisprudence and professor of Philosophy at Yale Law School
- Allan Gotthelf (B.A. 1963), professor of philosophy at the University of Pittsburgh and specialist in Objectivism and Aristotle
- Murray Greene (B.A. 1940), professor of philosophy, known for his expertise on Hegel's philosophy
- Eli Hirsch (B.A. 1960), philosopher, the Charles Goldman Professor of Philosophy at Brandeis University
- Sheldon Krimsky (B.S. 1963), bioethicist, science and private interests, professor of Urban and Environmental Policy and Planning at Tufts University
- Christia Mercer (B.A. 1974), Gustave M. Berne Professor in the Department of Philosophy at Columbia University
- Jay Newman (B.A. 1973), philosopher concerned with the philosophy of religion, philosophy of culture, and the ethics of mass communication
- Ben-Ami Scharfstein (B.A. 1939), prominent Israeli philosopher; winner of the 2005 Israel Prize
- Israel Scheffler (B.A. 1945), philosopher of science and education

=== Physics ===
- Alexander Calandra (B.A 1935), scientist, educator, and author, professor of physics at Washington University in St. Louis
- Esther M. Conwell (B.S. 1942), physicist, contributed to development of semiconductors and lasers
- Stanley Deser (B.S. 1949), physicist known for his contributions to general relativity, especially as co-developer of ADM formalism, Ancell Professor of Physics at Brandeis University
- Robert Ehrlich (B.S. 1959), particle physicist and educator; author of books about the tachyon, a hypothetical particle that travels faster than light
- James Forde (B.A. 1949), technician on the Manhattan Project 1944–1945
- Herbert Friedman (B.S. 1936), pioneer in the use of sounding rockets to conduct research for solar physics, aeronomy, and astronomy; Wolf Prize in Physics
- Jerry Goldstein (B.S. 1993), space physicist and professor
- David L. Goodstein (B.S. 1960), physicist, educator, vice-provost and Frank J. Gilloon Distinguished Teaching and Service Professor of the California Institute of Technology
- Abraham Klein (B.A. 1947), theoretical physicist
- Joel Lebowitz (B.S. 1952), survived Auschwitz; acknowledged for his contributions to statistical physics and statistical mechanics; studied Coulomb interactions and non-equilibrium statistical mechanics; George William Hill Professor of Mathematics and Physics at Rutgers University
- Arthur Oliner (B.A. 1941), physicist and electrical engineer, best known for his contributions to engineering electromagnetics and antenna theory
- Leon Pape (B.S. 1949), medical physicist specializing in biophysics, radiological health physics, electron microscopy, and membrane biophysics
- Charles M. Sommerfield (B.S. 1953), high-energy physicist and one of the namesakes of the Bogomol'nyi–Prasad–Sommerfield bound
- Larry Spruch (B.A. 1943), physicist specializing in theoretical atomic physics and astrophysics
- Sheldon Stone (B.S. 1967), physicist at Syracuse University best known for his work in experimental elementary particle physics, including the Large Hadron Collider beauty experiment
- Martin Summerfield (B.S. 1936), physicist and rocket scientist, co-founder of Aerojet, and the inventor of regenerative cooling for liquid rocket engines

=== Political science ===
- Ada Finifter (B.A. 1959), political scientist specializing in American public opinion and voting behavior
- Marilyn Gittell (B.A. 1952), political scientist, education reformer, founder of the Urban Affairs Review
- Dennis Hale (M.A. 1969), political scientist; Associate Professor of Political Science at Boston College
- Milton Heumann (B.A. 1968), professor of Political Science at Rutgers University
- Ruth Mandel (B.A. 1960), professor of political science, director of the Eagleton Institute of Politics at Rutgers University
- Allen Schick (B.A. 1956), governance fellow of the Brookings Institution, professor of political science at the Maryland School of Public Policy of University of Maryland, College Park, founding editor of the journal Public Budgeting and Finance
- Marvin Schick (B.A. 1956), Hunter College and New School for Social Research political science and constitutional law professor, known for his work in Jewish education
- Mitchell A. Seligson (B.A. 1967), Centennial Professor Emeritus of Political Science at Vanderbilt University, founder of the Latin American Public Opinion Project
- Aaron Wildavsky (B.A. 1954), political scientist

=== Psychology and psychiatry ===
- David Bakan (B.A. 1942), professor of Psychology at the University of Chicago and York University
- Reuben M. Baron (B.S. 1957), American social psychologist and professor emeritus at the University of Connecticut, best known for his highly cited 1986 paper with David A. Kenny distinguishing between mediator and moderator variables in social psychological research
- Robert A. Baron (B.A. 1964), professor of Psychology and Wellington Professor of Management at Rensselaer Polytechnic Institute's Lally School of Management
- Jack Block (b.a. 1945), psychology professor at UC Berkeley, creator, with his wife Jeanne Block, of the Block Study, a longitudinal study of children in Los Angeles
- Jason Brandt (B.A. 1975), professor emeritus of Psychiatry & Behavioral Sciences and Neurology at Johns Hopkins University; clinical neuropsychologist
- William Breitbart (B.S. 1973), psychiatrist, leader in the fields of psychosomatic medicine, psycho-oncology, and palliative care
- Jean Lau Chin (B.A. 1966), clinical psychologist known for her work on diversity in leadership, cultural competence in mental health care, and dean of the Gordon F. Derner School of Psychology at Adelphi University
- Emory L. Cowen (B.A. 1944), psychologist who pioneered the promotion of wellness in mental health
- Leah J. Dickstein (B.A. 1955, M.A. 1961), psychiatrist; founder and president of the Association of Women Psychiatrists
- Dorothy Dinnerstein (B.A. 1944), cognitive psychologist, co-founder of the Institute for Cognitive Studies at Rutgers University
- Jack Drescher (B.A. 1972), psychiatrist and psychoanalyst known for his work on sexual orientation and gender identity
- Hillel J. Einhorn (B.A. 1964, M.A. 1966), psychologist who played a key role in the development of the field of behavioral decision theory
- Herbert J. Freudenberger (B.A. 1952), psychologist, first to describe the symptoms of burnout and conduct research on the concept
- Marvin Goldfried (B.A. 1957), psychologist, co-founder of the Society for the Exploration of Psychotherapy Integration
- Howard E. Gruber (B.A. 1943), psychologist and pioneer of the psychological study of creativity
- Howard S. Hoffman (M.A. 1953), experimental psychologist
- David Kantor (B.A 1950, M.A. 1952), systems psychologist
- Louise Kaplan (B.A. 1950), psychologist and psychoanalyst best known for her research into sexual perversion and fetishism
- Saul Kassin (B.A. 1974), psychologist, author, and distinguished professor at John Jay College of Criminal Justice in New York
- Herbert Kelman (B.A. 1947), professor of social ethics at Harvard University, known for his work on conflict resolution in the Middle East
- Howard H. Kendler (B.A. 1940), psychologist who conducted research on latent and discrimination learning
- Sandra Leiblum (B.A. 1965), author, lecturer, and researcher in sexology
- Zella Luria (B.A. 1944), psychologist and feminist, known for her pioneering work on the development of gender identity
- Salvatore R. Maddi (B.A. 1954, M.A. 1956), professor of Psychology at University of California, Irvine, expert on resilience and founder of the Hardiness Institute
- Carol Nadelson (B.A. 1957), psychiatrist; first female president of the American Psychiatric Association
- Ira Progoff (B. A. 1941), psychotherapist, best known for his development of the Intensive Journal Method
- Leanne Rivlin (B.A. 1952), pioneer in environmental psychology
- Milton Rokeach (B.A. 1941), professor of social psychology and developer of the Rokeach Value Survey
- Gerald Rosenbaum (B.A. 1943), Distinguished Professor of Psychology at San Diego State University, author of numerous works on alcoholism, anxiety disorders, neuropsychology, and schizophrenia
- Mira Rothenberg (B.A. 1943), holocaust survivor and a pioneer child psychologist in the treatment of children with autism
- Julian Rotter (B.A. 1937), psychologist, pioneered research on locus of control
- Janina Scarlet (B.A. 2005, M.A. 2008) Ukrainian-born American author and clinical psychologist known for utilizing popular culture references in treating patients
- Irvin S. Schonfeld (B.S. 1969), City College and CUNY Graduate Center psychology professor, noted for studies of job-related depression and burnout and the development of psychometric instruments for job-related mental health assessment
- Francine Shapiro (B.A. 1968, MA, 1972), psychologist and educator who originated and developed EMDR
- Irwin Silverman (B.A. 1958), professor of psychology at York University, best known for work in evolutionary psychology and sex differences in intelligence
- Roberta Temes (B.A. 1962), author, psychotherapist, and clinical hypnotist
- Dorothy Tennov (B.A. 1950), psychologist, introduced the term "limerence" to describe the state of being in love
- Hans Toch (B.A. 1952), prolific author and social psychologist involved in criminology and criminal justice administration
- Rhoda Unger (B.A. 1960), feminist psychologist, pioneering figure in the Association for Women in Psychology
- Beatrice A. Wright (B.A. 1938), psychologist known for her work in rehabilitation counseling
- Philip Zimbardo (B.A. 1954), social psychologist and designer of the Stanford Prison Experiment

=== Sociology ===
- Helen A. Berger (B.A. 1971), sociologist known for her studies of the Pagan community in the United States
- Joseph Berger (B.A. 1949), theoretical sociologist and senior fellow at the Hoover Institution
- Leo Bogart (B.A 1941), sociologist, media and marketing expert
- Helen Fein (B.A. 1955), historical sociologist, professor, specialized on genocide, human rights, collective violence and other issues
- Arne L. Kalleberg (B.A. 1971), Kenan Distinguished Professor of Sociology at the University of North Carolina at Chapel Hill; faculty fellow at the Carolina Population Center
- Omar Lizardo (B.A. 1997), sociologist, LeRoy Neiman Term chair, professor of Sociology at UCLA
- Seymour M. Miller (B.A. 1943), economic-political sociologist, activist, and emeritus professor of sociology at Boston University

== Art, literature, music, and photography ==
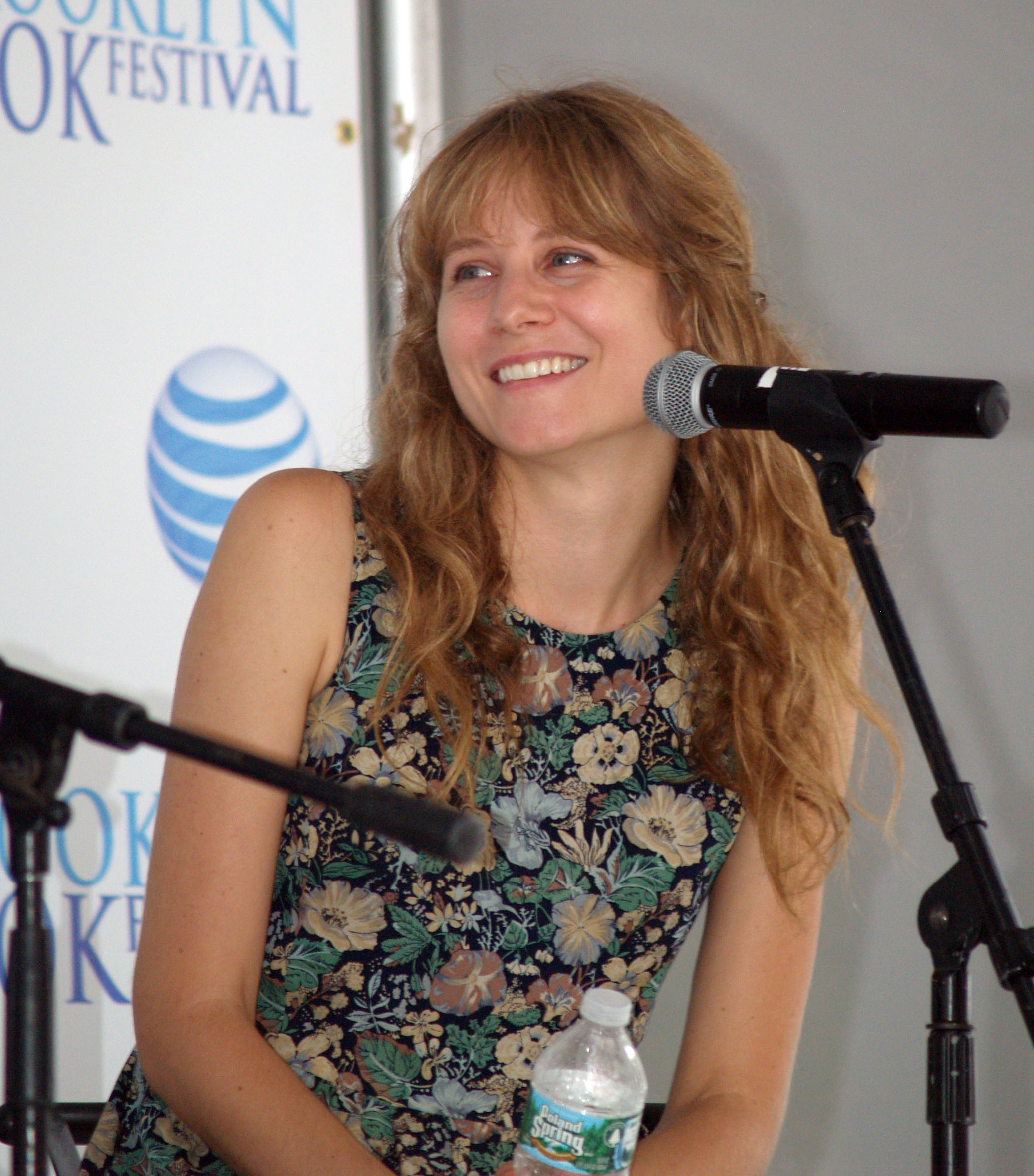
Annie Baker

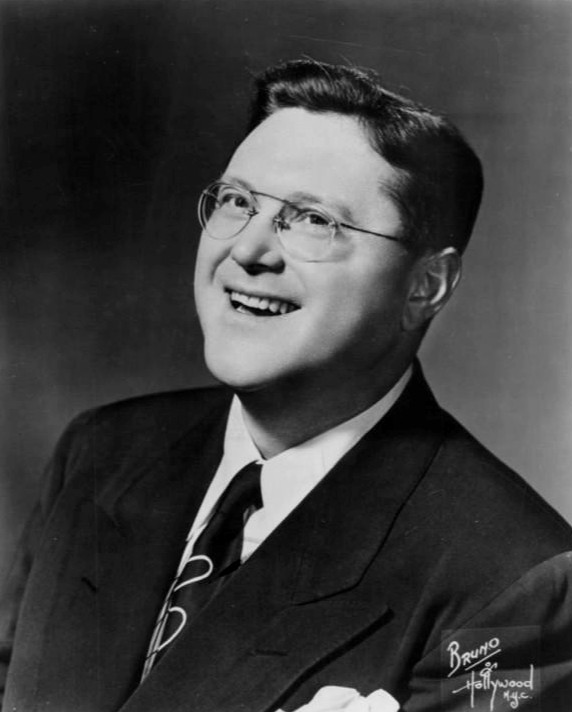
Sam Levenson

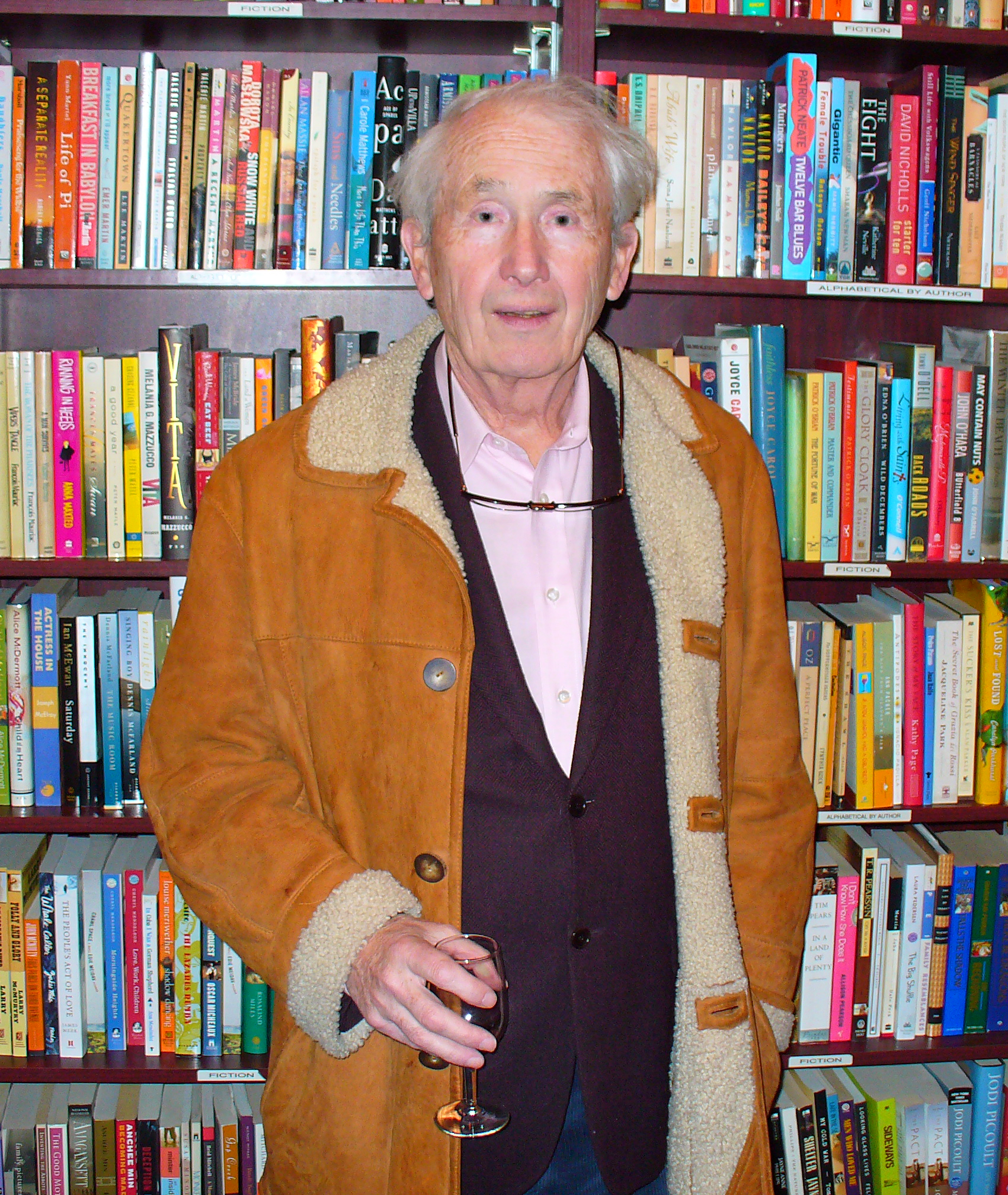
Frank McCourt

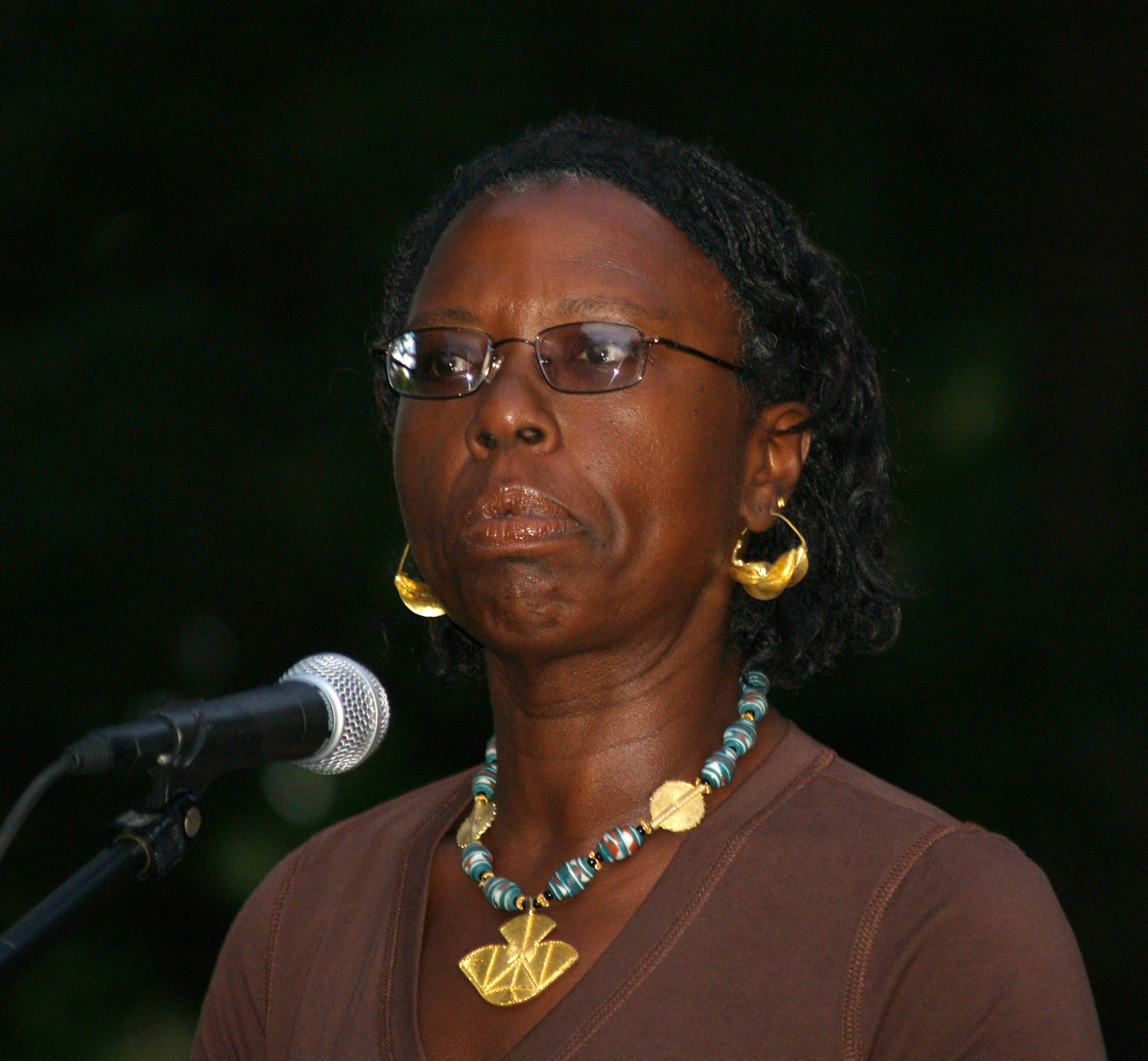
Gloria Naylor

Peter Nero

=== Art ===
- Cecile Abish (B.A. 1953), artist known for sculpture and photography
- Jack Adler (B.A. 1942), award-winning cover artist and colorist for DC Comics
- Mario Amaya (B.A. 1954), art critic; shot by Valerie Solanas during her assassination attempt on Andy Warhol
- Suzanne Anker (B.A. 1967), visual artist, theorist and pioneer in Bio Art
- Helène Aylon (B.A. 1960), multimedia ecofeminist artist
- Gina Beavers (M.SEd, 2005), Greek-American painter, whose subject include food, makeup, and viral images, often in bas-relief
- Michael Corris (B.A. 1970), artist, art historian, and writer on art
- Patricia Cronin (M.F.A. 1995), Rome Prize-winning feminist visual artist
- Sante D'Orazio (B.A. 1978), fashion photographer
- Yevgeniy Fiks (B.F.A. 1997), multidisciplinary, post-Soviet conceptual artist
- Jane Freilicher (B.A. 1947), representational painter and member of the informal New York School
- Gregory William Frux (M.F.A. 1985), traditional realist artist, working mainly in the landscape genre
- Eunice Golden (M.F.A. 1980), feminist painter
- Shirley Gorelick (B.A. 1944), painter of psychological realism
- Susan Grabel (B.A. 1963), feminist artist
- Angela Jansen (B.A. 1951), painter, sculptor, print-maker and photographer
- Karen Karnes (B.A. 1946), ceramist, known for her earth-toned stoneware ceramics
- Ada Katz (B.S. 1950), wife and model of Alex Katz
- Gloria Klein (B.A. 1959), painter, founding member of the Pattern and Decoration movement and member of the Criss-Cross art cooperative
- Frances Kornbluth (B.A. 1940), abstract expressionist painter
- Marni Kotak (M.F.A. 2006), artist known for her durational performance/exhibition "The Birth of Baby X," in which she gave birth to her son
- Margia Kramer (B.A. 1961), documentary visual artist, writer and activist
- Albert Kresch (B.A. 1943), New York School painter and one of the original members of the Jane Street Gallery
- Bernard Krigstein (B.A. 1940), illustrator and gallery artist who received acclaim for his innovative and influential approach to comic book art, notably in EC Comics
- Mort Künstler (B.A. 1946), painter and illustrator of the American Civil War
- Gabriel Laderman (B.A. 1952), painter and important exponent of the Figurative revival
- Abshalom Jac Lahav (M.F.A. 2008), Israeli-born, New York City–based artist known for his portraits of historical figures in modern contexts
- Martin Lemelman (B.A. 1972), American freelance illustrator and graphic memoirist
- Annette Michelson (B.A. 1948), art and film critic and writer whose work contributed to the fields of cinema studies and the avant-garde in visual culture
- Cindy Nemser (B.A. 1959, M.A. 1964), art historian and writer; founder and editor of the Feminist Art Journal
- Jed Perl (M.F.A. 1974), art critic, formerly with The New Republic 1994–2014
- Robert Phillips (M.A. 1982), Classical guitarist, composer, educator, and Head of Performing Arts at All Saints' Academy
- Elaine Reichek (B.A. 1963), New York-based visual artist, whose work often concerns the history of the embroidered sampler
- Walter Skolnik (B.A. 1955), composer and musical educator
- Laurie Spiegel (B.A. 1975), electronic-music composer, inventor
- Adrianne Wortzel (B.A. 1963, New York-based new media artist, robotics and theater, artists books, video, painting
- Malcah Zeldis (B.A. 1972), twentieth-century Jewish American folk painter

=== Literature ===
- Sam Abrams (B.A. 1958), "The Old Pothead Poet", Rochester Institute of Technology professor, Whitman scholar
- Lauren Acampora (M.F.A. 2004), American novelist and short story writer
- Jack Agüeros (B.A. 1964), Puerto Rican community activist, poet, writer, translator, and director of the Museo del Barrio in New York City
- Saladin Ahmed (M.F.A. 2002), Arab-American science fiction and fantasy writer and poet
- Rilla Askew (M.F.A 1989), Oklahoma-based short story writer and novelist
- Annie Baker (M.F.A. 2009), Pulitzer Prize-winning playwright
- Jess Barbagallo (M.F.A. 2009), transgender writer, director, and performer based in New York City
- Clare Barron (M.F.A. 2016), playwright and actor; won the 2015 Obie Award for Playwriting for You Got Older; finalist for the 2019 Pulitzer Prize for Drama for Dance Nation
- Jennifer Bartlett (M.A. 2004), poet, editor, and disability activist
- Chloë Bass (M.F.A. 2011), conceptual artist who works in performance and social practice
- Paul Beatty (M.F.A. 1989), African-American poet, novelist, and critic
- Eliza Bent (M.F.A. 2013), American playwright, performer, and journalist; Associate Professor of Radio/Television/Film at Northwestern University
- Eddie Berganza (B.A. 1986), Group Editor for DC Comics
- Karen Berger (B.A. 1979), editor of DC Comics' Vertigo imprint
- Anselm Berrigan (M.F.A. 1998), poet and teacher and artistic director of the St. Mark's Poetry Project 2003–2007
- Marie-Helene Bertino (M.F.A. 2008), American novelist and short story writer, winner of a Pushcart Prize and an O. Henry Prize
- Susan Simensky Bietila (B.A. 1969), Milwaukee-based artist whose protest art includes art and illustrations for underground newspapers
- Florence Bonime (B.A. 1975), novelist; published under the name Florence Cummings
- Michael Bradford (M.F.A. 2000), playwright and former artistic director of the Connecticut Repertory Theatre
- Himan Brown (B.A. 1934), radio pioneer; producer of radio programming, including the Inner Sanctum Mystery and the CBS Radio Mystery Theater
- Sylvia Cassedy (B.A. 1951), children's and young adult fiction author, best known for her 1983 novel Behind the Attic Wall
- Allen Cohen (B.A. 1962), poet, founder and editor of the San Francisco Oracle underground newspaper (1966–68)
- Garrard Conley (M.F.A. 2020), author and LGBTQ activist known for his autobiography Boy Erased: A Memoir
- Amanda Davis (M.F.A. 1998), writer; author of Wonder When You'll Miss Me
- J. M. DeMatteis (B.A. 1976), writer of comic books
- Thomas Devaney (MFA 1998), poet and 2014 Pew Fellow in the Arts
- Kristoffer Díaz (MFA, 2009), playwright, screenwriter, and educator; finalist for the 2010 Pulitzer Prize for Drama
- Dan DiDio (B.A. 1983), comic book editor and executive for DC Comics
- Valerie D'Orazio (B.A. 1996), American comic book writer and editor
- Natalie Edgar (B.A. 1953), abstract expressionist painter, former critic for ARTnews
- Hillard Elkins (B.A. 1950), theatre and film producer
- Stanley Ellin (B.A. 1936), Edgar Award-winning mystery author
- Robert Friend (B.A. 1934), Israeli poet and translator
- Alice Friman (B.A. 1954), poet; Poet-in-Residence at Georgia College
- Elizabeth Gaffney (M.F.A. 1997), novelist and staff editor of The Paris Review, 1989–2005
- Elliott Galkin (B.A. 1943), music critic of The Baltimore Sun, director of the Peabody Institute, and sometime conductor of the Baltimore Symphony Orchestra
- Mike Garson (B.A. 1970), pianist; has worked with David Bowie, Nine Inch Nails, Billy Corgan, Free Flight, and The Smashing Pumpkins
- Ja'Tovia Gary (B.A. 2012), artist and filmmaker whose works explore black feminist themes
- Yitzhak Goren (M.F.A. 1980), an Egyptian-born Israeli writer
- Richard Grayson (B.A. 1973, M.F.A. 1976), writer, political activist and performance artist
- Irving Greenfield (B.A. 1950), prolific author of more than 300 novels
- Roya Hakakian (B.S. 1990), Jewish Iranian-American writer
- Jean Halpert–Ryden (attended in the 1930s), painter
- Irving Harper (B.A. 1937), noted 20th-century industrial designer
- Bruce Isaacson (M.F.A. 1992) is an American poet and publisher; appointed the first poet laureate of Clark County, Nevada
- Tanwi Nandini Islam (MFA 2009), aka Tanaïs, Bangladeshi American fiction writer, memoirist and perfumer; winner of the 2022 Kirkus Prize for nonfiction
- Lee Israel (B.A, 1961), noted author who became a literary forger and thief; subject of 2018 film Can You Ever Forgive Me?
- Chester Kallman (B.A. 1941), poet, librettist, and translator; collaborator with W. H. Auden
- Howard Kaminsky (B.A. 1961), publisher, author and film producer
- Ben Katchor (B.A. 1975), cartoonist, creator of Julius Knipl, Real Estate Photographer
- Sibyl Kempson (M.F.A. 2007), playwright and performer
- Daniel Keyes (B.A. 1950. M.A. '61), author known for his Hugo award-winning short story and Nebula award-winning novel Flowers for Algernon
- Amirtha Kidambi (M.M. 2012), Jazz musician (vocal, harmonium, composition)
- Binnie Kirshenbaum (M.F.A. 1984), novelist, short story writer, Columbia University creative writing professor
- Rhea Kohan (B.A. 1958), writer, author of the novels Save Me a Seat (1979) and Hand-Me-Downs (1980)
- Frances Koncan (M.F.A. 2013), Anishinaabe-Slovene journalist, theater director, and playwright from Couchiching First Nation who lives in Winnipeg, Manitoba
- Jacqueline Kudler (B.A. 1956), poet and educator who lived in Sausalito, California
- Joan Larkin (M.F.A. 2005), poet, playwright, and writing teacher; co-founder of the independent publishing company Out & Out Books, part of the small press lesbian feminist publishing explosion of the 1970s
- Haruna Lee (M.F.A. 2015), Taiwanese Japanese American theatre-maker writer, and member of the New Dramatists' resident playwright company
- Young Jean Lee (M.F.A. 2005), OBIE Award-winning playwright and director of experimental theater, artistic director of Young Jean Lee's Theater Company
- Alan Lelchuk (B.A. 1960), novelist
- Sam Levenson (B.A. 1934), humorist, author
- M Lin (M.F.A. 2023), Chinese writer living in the US, winner of the 2023 Ploughshares Emerging Writer's Contest and the PEN/Robert J. Dau Short Story Prize for Emerging Writers
- Leonard Lopate (B.A. 1967), host of the public radio talk show The Leonard Lopate Show, broadcast on WNYC
- Robert Lyons (M.F.A. 2010), writer, playwright and director, best known as the artistic director the two-time OBIE Award-winning New Ohio Theatre in New York City
- Jackson Mac Low (B.A. 1958), poet, performance artist, composer and playwright
- Rajendra Ramoon Maharaj (M.F.A. 2011), Indo-Afro-Caribbean American theater director, playwright, producer and activist
- Wallace Markfield (B.A. 1947), comic novelist, film critic
- Paule Marshall (B.A. 1953), author, novelist (Brown Girl, Brownstones (1959), Praisesong for the Widow (1983))
- Maxim Mazumdar (M.A. 1985), Indo-Canadian playwright and director
- Cris Mazza (M.F.A. 1983), novelist, short story and non-fiction writer
- Frank McCourt (M.A. 1967), Pulitzer Prize-winning author of Angela's Ashes and 'Tis
- Dennis McFarland (B.A. 1975), novelist; The Music Room (1990)
- Michael McKenzie (B.A. 1973), artist, publisher, curator, and writer
- Murray Mednick (B.A. 1962), playwright
- Sharon Mesmer (M.F.A. 1990), writer and poet of the Flarf poetry movement
- Richard P. Minsky (B.A. 1968), scholar of bookbinding and a book artist
- Emily Mitchell (M.F.A. 2005), Anglo-American novelist
- Chiori Miyagawa (M.F.A. 1992), Japanese-born American playwright, poet, dramaturg, and fiction writer
- Stephen Motika (M.F.A. 2010), an American poet, editor, and publisher of Nightboat Books
- Gloria Naylor (B.A. 1981), novelist; winner of National Book Award
- Harold Norse (B.A. 1938), poet and novelist
- Iris Owens (B.A. 1951), also known by pseudonym Harriet Daimler, novelist
- Maia Cruz Palileo (M.F.A. 2008), artist
- Brian Parks (M.F.A 2007), an American playwright; former Arts & Culture editor of The Village Voice and chair of its Obie Awards
- Angelo Parra (M.F.A. 1995), playwright
- Lincoln Peirce (M.F.A. 1987), cartoonist of the comic strip Big Nate
- Victor Perera (B.A. 1956), Guatemalan-born author and journalist primarily concerned with Latin America and Sephardic Jewry
- Rosalie Purvis (M.F.A. 2007), Dutch American theatre director and choreographer
- Anna Rabinowitz (B.A. 1953), poet, librettist, editor and editor emerita of American Letters & Commentary
- Burton Raffel (B.A. 1948), teacher, poet and translator of Beowulf, Horace, Rabelais and Cervantes
- Naomi Ragen (B.A. 1971), American-Israeli author, playwright and women's rights activist
- Eleanor Reissa (B.A. 1974), actress, singer, theatre director, playwright, librettist; performs in English and Yiddish, specializing in Yiddish theatre and songs
- Martha Rosler (B.A. 1965), artist active in video, photo-text, installation, and performance
- Norman Rosten (B.A. 1935), poet, playwright, novelist, Poet Laureate of Brooklyn (1979–1995)
- Matthue Roth (M.F.A. 2014), columnist, author, poet, spoken word performer, video game designer, and screenwriter
- Theodore Isaac Rubin (B.A. 1946), psychiatrist and author; wrote story for the film David and Lisa (1962)
- Howard Sackler (B.A. 1950), Pulitzer Prize-winning screenwriter and playwright, known for 1967 play The Great White Hope
- Steve Salerno (B.A. 1972), American nonfiction author of three books, including Deadly Blessing, about the death of Price Daniel Jr., which became the TV movie Bed of Lies
- Sapphire (M.F.A. 1995), author and performance poet, author of the novel Push (1996)
- Tina Satter (M.F.A. 2008), playwright and director
- Millicent Selsam (B.A. 1932), children's author
- Irwin Shaw (born Irwin Shamforoff; B.A. 1934), playwright, screenwriter, and short-story author and novelist (The Young Lions, Rich Man, Poor Man); winner of two O. Henry Awards
- Sara Shepard (M.F.A. 2005), author known for the bestselling Pretty Little Liars and The Lying Game book series; both were developed into television series on ABC Family
- Shraga Silverstein (B.A. 1940, M.A. 1954), rabbi, educator and prolific author and translator
- Jan Slepian (B.A. 1971), author of books for children and young adult fiction
- Robert Kimmel Smith (B.A. 1951), children's author, known for Chocolate Fever (1972) and Jane's House (1982)
- Gilbert Sorrentino (B.A. 1957), novelist, short story writer, poet, literary critic, and editor
- Ed Spielman (A.A. 1965), writer and producer, one of the creators of the TV series Kung Fu; also creator of the TV series The Young Riders and Dead Man's Gun
- Jason Starr (M.F.A. 1990), Anthony Award- and Barry Award-winning author of crime fiction novels and thrillers
- Claire Sterling (B.A. 1940), author and journalist, author of The Terror Network (1981)
- Gregory Tague (B.A. 1979), multidisciplinary literary scholar; founder and editor of the literary journal Literary Veganism: An Online Journal
- Ronald Tavel (B.A. 1957), screenwriter, director, novelist, poet and actor, known for his work with Andy Warhol and The Factory
- David Trinidad (M.F.A. 1990), poet
- Chiqui Vicioso (B.A. 1979), poet, writer, sociologist and Dominican diplomat
- Jericho Vincent (B.A. 2007), author and memoirist; Cut Me Loose: Sin and Salvation After My Ultra-Orthodox Girlhood (2014)
- Malvin Wald (B.A. 1936), screenwriter, authored the 1948 police drama The Naked City
- Nari Ward (M.F.A. 1992), Jamaican-born artist based in New York City whose work is often composed of found objects from his neighborhood, and addresses "issues related to consumer culture, poverty, and race"
- Barbara Weisberg (M.F.A. 1993), historian, author, and television producer; co-created the television series Charles in Charge
- Marion Winik (M.F.A. 1983), journalist and author, best known for her work on NPR's All Things Considered
- Leah Nanako Winkler (M.F.A. 2018), Japanese American playwright whose play God Said This won the 2018 Yale Drama Series Prize
- De'Shawn Charles Winslow (B.F.A. 2011, M.A. 2013), novelist, debut novel In West Mills won the Center for Fiction First Novel Prize and an American Book Award
- Adrianne Wortzel (B.A. 1964), contemporary artist who uses robotics
- Jeffrey Cyphers Wright (M.F.A 1987), New Romantic poet associated with St. Mark's Poetry Project
- John Yau (M.F.A. 1978), critic, essayist, poet, and prose writer
- Alan Zelenetz (B.A. 1970), film producer and comic-book writer, co-creator of the series Alien Legion for the Marvel Comics imprint Epic Comics, and a founder of Ovie Entertainment

=== Music and dance ===
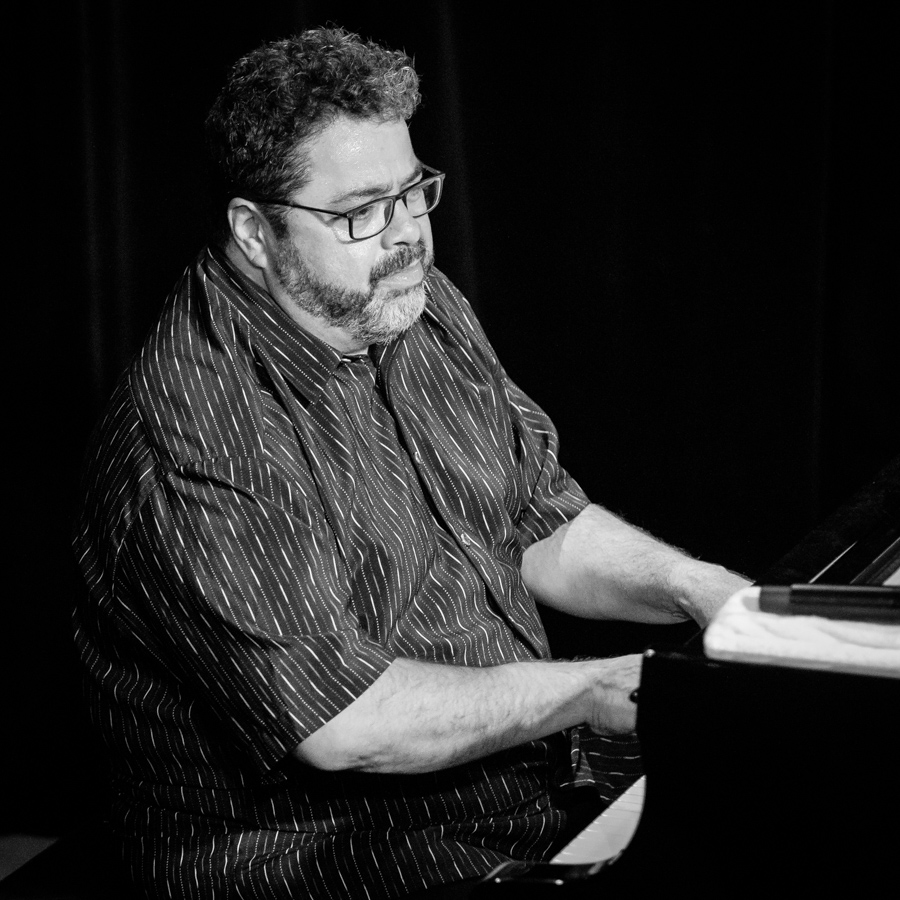
Arturo O’Farrill

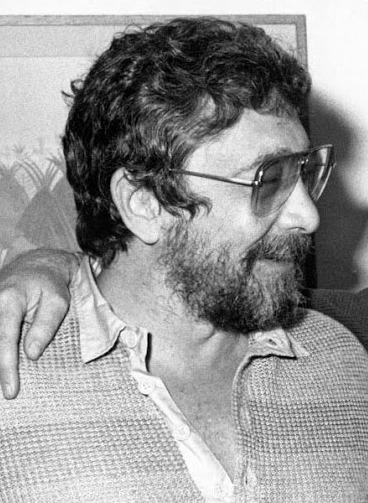
Walter Yetnikoff

- Gan-ya Ben-gur Akselrod (M.M. 2012), American-Israeli operatic soprano
- Mark Barkan (B.A. 1956), songwriter and record producer and the musical director for the television show The Banana Splits Adventure Hour
- Huáscar Barradas (B.M. 1987), Venezuelan flautist and professor of flute at the Instituto Universitario de Estudios Musicales in Caracas
- Benjamin Bierman (M.M. 2002), jazz trumpeter, composer, and bandleader
- Susan Birkenhead (B.A. 1957), lyricist
- Benjamin Boretz (B.A. 1954), 20th- and 21st-century composer and music theorist
- Oscar Brand (B.S. 1942), folk singer, radio host, musicologist
- Madelyn Byrne (M.M. 1993), noted composer of both acoustic and computer music
- Isidore Cohen (B.A 1941), chamber musician, violinist, and member of the Juilliard String Quartet and Beaux Arts Trio
- Alex Coletti (B.A. 1987), executive producer and director for MTV Networks, now an independent producer
- Eddie Daniels (B.A. 1963), jazz clarinet and alto and tenor saxophone player; also a classical music clarinetist
- Deborah Drattell (B.A. 1976), composer, best known for opera
- Rebekah Driscoll (M.M. 2012), composer
- Jordan Dykstra (M.F.A. 2024), film music and chamber music composer and violist
- S. Stevan Dweck (A.A. 1948), Broadway and Jazz drummer, most notably with Stan Kenton; a clinical psychologist later in life and major benefactor to the Brooklyn Public Library
- Sylvia Fine (B.A. 1933), lyricist; wife of comedian Danny Kaye
- Gary William Friedman (B.A. 1958), musician and composer of musical theater
- David Geffen, business magnate, co-created Asylum Records, Geffen Records, DGC Records, and DreamWorks SKG
- Daniel Glass (B.A. 1977), music industry producer
- Joe Glazer (B.A. 1938), folk musician often referred to as "labor's troubadour"
- David Gordon (B.F.A. 1956), dancer, choreographer, theatre director, writer
- Henry Gross (B.A. 1972), singer-songwriter and founding member of the retro pop group Sha Na Na
- Larry Harlow, aka Lawrence Ira Khan (B.A. 1963), salsa composer, pianist, and musician
- Fred Hellerman (B.A. 1949), folk singer, guitarist, producer and songwriter, primarily known as one of the members of The Weavers
- Cihan Kaan (B.S. 1999), musician; filmmaker; author; recorded electronic music under the alias "8Bit"
- Haim Keenan (M.S.1975), Israeli lyricist, broadcaster and film critic who began writing hit songs in the mid '60s
- Kim Ji-hyun, South Korean singer
- Ezra Laderman (B.A. 1950), composer of classical music
- Harvey Lichtenstein (B.A. 1951), president and executive producer of the Brooklyn Academy of Music
- Fred Lonberg-Holm (B.M. 1988), cello player and composer
- Bob Margolis (B.A. 1974, M.M. 1977), composer of concert music and owner of Manhattan Beach Music Publishers
- Alan Meltzer (B.A. 1968), music industry pioneer, founded CD One Stop and Wind-up Records; known for best-selling artists Creed and Evanescence
- Gladys Smuckler Moskowitz (B.A. 1949), folk singer (as Gladys Young), composer and teacher
- Jerry Moss (B.A., 1957), co-founder of A & M Records
- Norman Narotzky (B.A. 1949), American and Spanish artist living in Barcelona; known for abstractionism as well as figurative painting and transitional styles
- Peter Nero (born Bernard Nierow; B.A. 1956), Grammy Award-winning pianist; conductor; composer
- Enisa Nikaj (B.B.A. 2017), also known as Enisa, Montenegrin-American singer songwriter
- Christopher North (M.M. 2020); composer, bassist and multi-instrumental musician
- Sonny Ochs (B.A. 1970), music producer, radio host, sister of singer-songwriter Phil Ochs
- Arturo O'Farrill (BMus 1996), jazz musician and current pianist, composer, and director for the Afro Latin Jazz Orchestra
- Marco Oppedisano (B.M. 1996), guitarist and composer of electroacoustic music
- Robert Phillips (M.M. 1982), an American classical guitarist
- Lee Pockriss (B.A. 1948), songwriter who wrote many well-known popular songs, including "Itsy Bitsy Teenie Weenie Yellow Polka Dot Bikini"
- Doc Pomus (attended, 1943–45), blues singer, songwriter and member of the Rock and Roll Hall of Fame
- Reparata and the Delrons, girl group made up of Lorraine Mazzola, '68, Nanette Licari, '70, and Mary "Reparata" Aiese '69
- David Sardy, music producer, film composer
- Rafael Scarfullery (B.M. 1993), Dominican classical guitarist
- Walter Skolnik (B.A. 1955), composer and musical educator
- Maynard Solomon (B.A. 1950), co-founder of Vanguard Records, music producer, and musicologist
- Alan Vega (B.A. 1960), vocalist for 1970s and 80s electronic protopunk duo Suicide
- Dirk Weiler (M.M. 2002), singer and actor
- Alon Yavnai (M.M. 2018), Israel-born jazz pianist and composer
- Walter Yetnikoff (B.A. 1955), CEO of CBS Records, Columbia Records/Sony Music executive
- Rafi Zabor (B.A. 1967), music journalist- and musician-turned-novelist

=== Photography ===
- Kwesi Abbensetts (B.A. 2012), Guyanese photographer based in New York City
- Emil Cadoo (B.A. 1952), photographer
- Perla de Leon (B.A. 1978), photographer known for her "South Bronx Spirit" photo series, documenting the urban decay of the South Bronx
- Felice Frankel (B.S. 1966), photographer of scientific images who has received multiple awards, both for the aesthetic quality of her science photographs
- Marcia Bricker Halperin (B.A. 1975), photographer who published Kibbitz & Nosh, a book that displays a collection of her photographs of Dubrow's Cafeteria
- Marvin Heiferman (B.A. 1968), influential photography curator and writer
- Naomi Rosenblum (B.A. 1948), historian of photography, author of A World History of Photography (1984) and A History of Women Photographers (1994)
- Ellen R. Sandor (B.A. 1963), new media artist and photography collector; proponent of PHSColograms, art that combines photography, holography, sculpture, and computer graphics

== Business ==
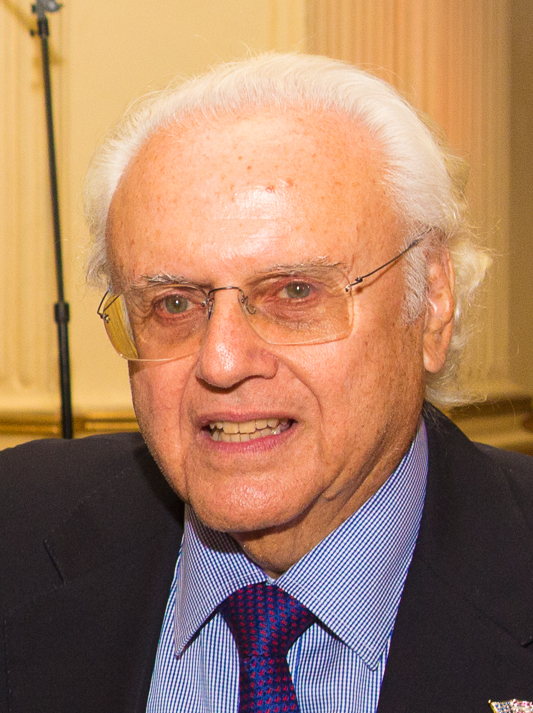
Ira Rennert

- Fred Bass (B.A. 1949), owner of New York City's Strand Bookstore
- Charles Biderman (B.A. 1967), founder and CEO of TrimTabs Investment Research, Inc.
- Joseph Cassano (B.A. 1977), head of Financial Product division at American International Group 1987–2008
- Bruce Chizen (B.S. 1978), president and CEO of Adobe Systems
- Bernard Cornfeld (B.A. 1950), businessman and international financier, sold investments in mutual funds
- Robert A. Daly, CEO of Warner Bros. and Los Angeles Dodgers
- Benjamin Eisenstadt (B.A. 1954), creator of Sweet'N Low, designer of the modern sugar packet, and the founder of Cumberland Packing Corporation
- Irwin Federman (B.S. 1956), businessman, philanthropist and general partner of U.S. Venture Partners
- Jerry Della Femina (A.A. 1957), chairman and CEO, Della Femina, Jeary and Partners
- Milton Fisher (B.A. 1938), attorney, investment banker, author, teacher, and matchmaker
- Richard LaMotta (B.A. 1969), inventor and principal promoter of the Chipwich ice cream sandwich
- Marjorie Magner (B.S. 1969), chairman of Gannett
- Jerry Moss (B.A. 1957), co-founder of A&M Records
- Ira Rennert (B.A. 1955), billionaire investor and businessman
- Steve Riggio (B.A. 1974), CEO of Barnes & Noble, Inc.
- George H. Ross (B.A. 1951), executive vice president and senior counsel of the Trump Organization
- Barry Salzberg (B.S. 1974), chief executive officer Deloitte, member of Deloitte's U.S. board of directors, the Deloitte Touche Tohmatsu Global Executive Committee, the DTT Global board of directors, Deloitte LLP
- Richard L. Sandor (B.A. 1962), businessman, economist, and entrepreneur, recognized as the "father of financial futures"
- Charlie Shrem (B.A. 2012), co-founder and CEO of the Bitcoin startup company BitInstant
- Leonard Tow (B.A. 1950), chairman and CEO of Citizens Communications
- Agnes Varis (B.A. 1950), president and founder of Agvar Chemicals Inc. and Aegis Pharmaceuticals
- Lester Wunderman (B.A. 1938), advertising executive considered the creator of modern-day direct marketing
- Sigi Ziering (B.S. 1953), German-born American business executive, playwright and philanthropist

== Entertainment ==
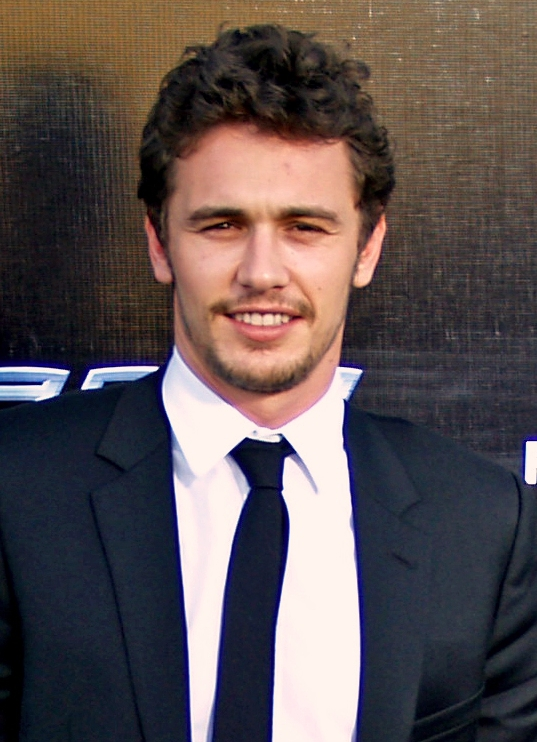
James Franco

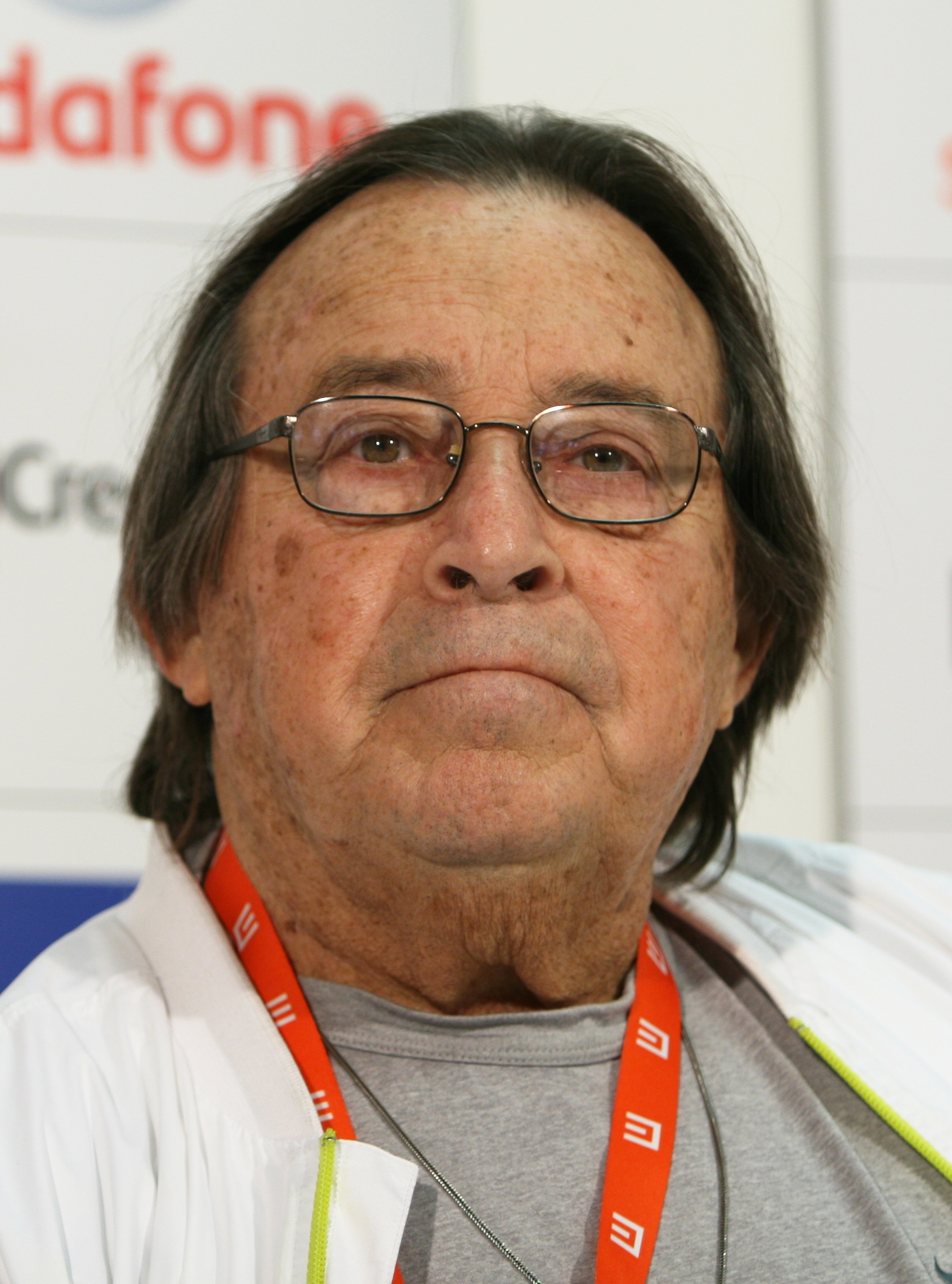
Paul Mazursky

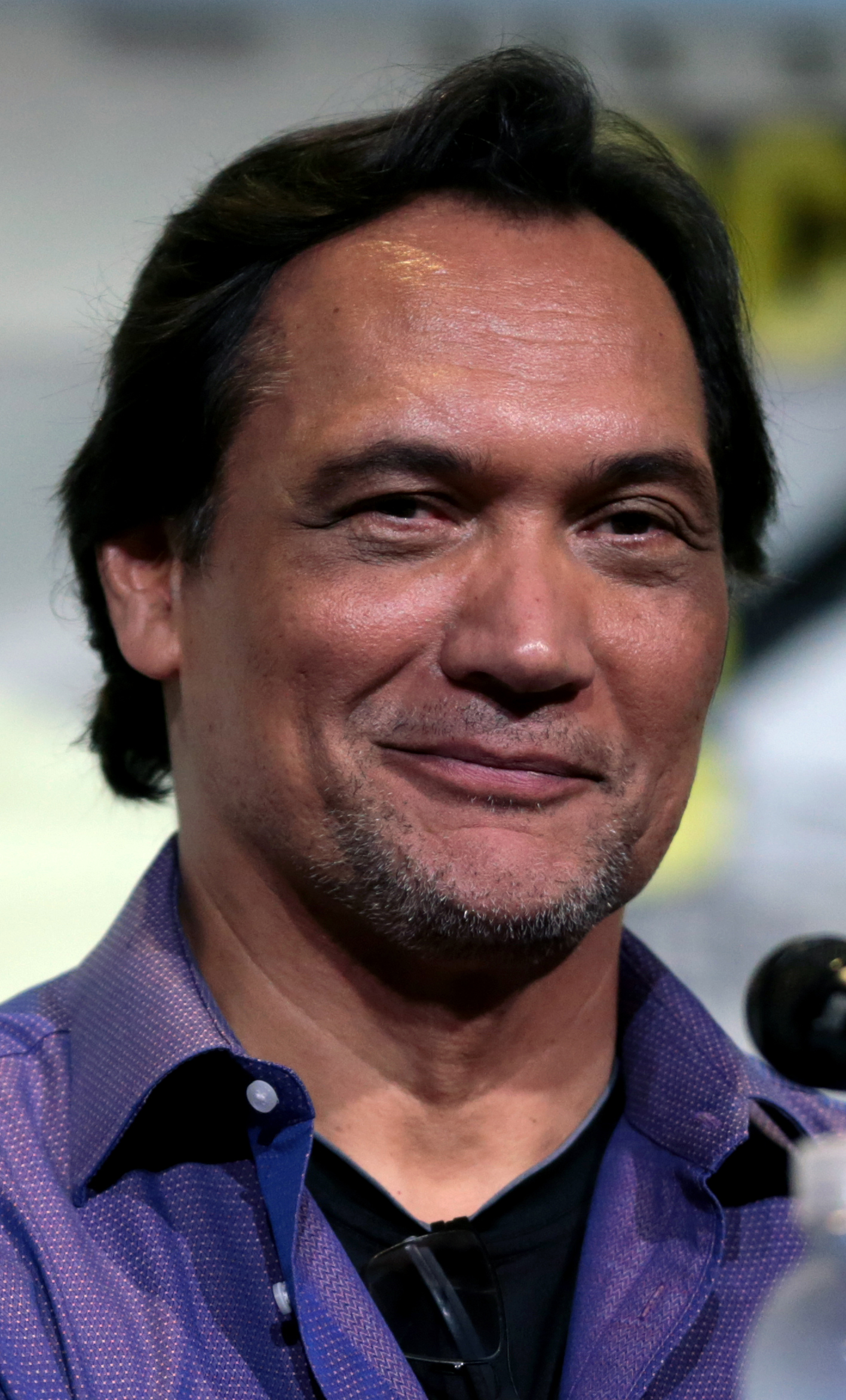
Jimmy Smits

- Michael Alaimo, film, stage and television actor
- Ozzie Alfonso (M.A. 1969), Emmy Award-winning director of children's television
- Letty Aronson (B.A. 1964), film producer; sister of Woody Allen
- Obba Babatundé (B.A. 1974), Emmy and Tony Award-nominated actor
- Sandy Baron (B.A. 1957), comedian, stage, film, and television actor
- Saul Bass, graphic designer and filmmaker, won the Academy Award for Documentary Short Subject
- Sarah Benson (M.F.A.), theatre director, artistic director of SoHo Rep
- Alvin Boretz (B.A. 1942), television writer for GE Theater, Playhouse 90, Armstrong Circle Theatre, Dr. Kildare, The Defenders, and Kojak
- Todd Brunel (M.M. 2007), clarinetist who leads a dual life as a crossover classical and jazz musician
- Henry Chan (M.S. 1973), film and television director
- Aleeza Chanowitz (B.A. 2016), Israeli-American director, screenwriter and actress; known for creating and starring in the hit comedy series Chanshi
- Jordan Charney (B.A. 1961), character actor
- Dominic Chianese (B.A. 1961), film, television and theatre actor, known for his role as Corrado "Junior" Soprano on the HBO TV series The Sopranos
- Joan Cullman (born Joan Paley) (B.A. 1953), Tony Award Broadway producer
- Jon Cypher (B.A. 1953), actor, known for his role as Chief of Police Fletcher Daniels in the police drama Hill Street Blues
- Alfred Drake (B.A. 1936), musical theater actor and singer
- Joel Eisenberg (B.A. 1985), author, screenwriter, and producer
- James Franco (M.F.A. 2010), Golden Globe Award-winning film and TV actor, author
- Richard Frankel (B.A. 1968), six-time Tony Award-winning theatrical producer
- Devery Freeman (B.A. 1935), prolific screenwriter, novelist and union activist who helped to establish the Writers Guild of America
- Takeshi Fukunaga (B.A. 2007), Japanese filmmaker; Out of My Hand
- Philip S. Goodman (B.A. 1948), screenwriter, producer, and director
- Morty Gunty (B.A. 1950), actor and comedian, well-known New York City nightclub comic in the 1960s and 1970s
- C. Bernard Jackson (B.A. 1948), playwright who founded the Inner City Cultural Center in Los Angeles
- Milt Jamin (B.A. 1963), voice and film actor
- Citizen Kafka (Richard Shulberg) (B.A. 1969), radio personality and folk musician
- Marvin Kaplan (B.A. 1947), character actor, president of Los Angeles chapter of American Federation of Television and Radio Artists 1989–95; 2003–05
- Robert Kerman (B.A. 1970), actor
- Woodie King, Jr. (M.F.A. 1999), director and producer of stage and screen, and founding director of the New Federal Theatre
- Mousa Kraish (B.A. 1998), actor and director
- Tuli Kupferberg (B.A. 1948), counterculture poet, author, cartoonist, pacifist anarchist, publisher and co-founder of the band The Fugs
- Jean-Claude La Marre (B.A. 1992), Haitian-American writer, director, and film and television actor
- Obafemi Lasode (M.A. 1984), Nigerian veteran film actor, songwriter, playwright, film producer and director
- Ken Lerner (B.A. 1970), television and film actor
- Michael Lerner (B.A. 1962), Academy Award-nominated actor
- Edie Locke (attended 1940–43), editor-in chief of Mademoiselle
- Michael Lynne (B.A. 1961), co-founder and CEO of New Line Cinema
- Steve Malzberg (B.A. 1982), conservative radio broadcaster and host of The Steve Malzberg Show on the WOR Radio Network
- Paul Mazursky (B.A. 1951), Academy Award-nominated filmmaker, known for An Unmarried Woman, Harry and Tonto and Down and Out in Beverly Hills, among others; producer; actor
- Neil Meron (B.A. 1976), film producer, won Academy Award for Chicago in 2003
- Jared Mezzocchi (M.F.A. 2009), multimedia theater director, theatrical designer
- Bruce Morrow (born Bruce Meyerowitz) (attended), known as Cousin Brucie, radio performer, National Radio Hall of Fame
- Oren Moverman (B.A. 1992), Academy Award-nominated filmmaker, Emmy Award-winning producer.
- Larry Namer (B.A. 1971), founder of E! Entertainment TV Network
- Barry Oringer (B.A. 1958), prolific producer and screenwriter
- Eric Overmyer (M.F.A. 1982), television writer and producer; The Wire
- Marcel Peragine (B.A. 1975, M.S. 1981), film editor and musician-composer who lives and works in Germany
- Gil Portes (M.S. 1971), award-winning Filipino film director, film producer and screenwriter
- Richard Portnow (B.A. 1967), actor, known for recurring role in The Sopranos
- Dennis Prager (B.A. 1970), syndicated radio talk show host, columnist, author, ethicist, and public speaker, founder of PragerU
- Brian "Q" Quinn, comedian, stars in the TV show Impractical Jokers
- Mark Rappaport (B.A. 1964), independent/underground film director
- David Rayfiel (B.A. 1947), screenwriter, frequent collaborator of director Sydney Pollack
- Richard Reicheg (B.A. 1962, MA 1973), actor, folk singer, and songwriter, known for the song "Looking for an Echo"
- Jason Reischel (M.A. 2016), singer-songwriter who sometimes goes by the stage name My Cousin, The Emperor
- Howard Rosenman (B.A. 1965), producer and motion picture executive
- Marc Salem (B.A. 1975), mentalist and mind reader
- David Sardy (1984–1987), multiple Grammy winning record producer, film composer, mixer
- George Schindler (B.A. 1952), stage magician, magic consultant, and ventriloquist, "lifetime dean" of the Society of American Magicians
- Steve Schirripa (B.A. 1980), actor known for his role as Bobby Baccalieri on the HBO TV series The Sopranos
- Roger S. H. Schulman (B.A. 1980), film and television writer and producer, co-wrote the animated feature Shrek
- Stuart Seide (B.A. 1967), artistic director of the Théâtre du Nord in Lille, France, and the first American to direct the Comédie-Française
- Jimmy Smits (B.A. 1980), actor, NYPD Blue and L.A. Law; won Emmy Award in 1990
- Frank Tarloff (B.A. 1936), blacklisted screenwriter who won an Academy Award for Best Original Screenplay for Father Goose
- Elliot Tiber (attended, but did not graduate), screenwriter, "saved" Woodstock Festival
- Adrianne Tolsch (B.A. 1961), comedian long associated with Catch a Rising Star
- Tom Topor (B.A. 1961), playwright, screenwriter, and novelist
- Adam Wade (M.A. '87), singer, drummer, and television actor, noted for his stint as the host of the 1975 CBS game show Musical Chairs, which made him the first African-American game show host
- Naren Weiss (M.F.A. 2015), actor, playwright, and model
- Andrew D. Weyman (B.A. 1973), television director and producer
- Morton Wishengrad (B.A. 1935), playwright, screenwriter; principal writer on the religious radio series The Eternal Light
- Fawn Yacker (B.A. 1973), founding member of The Nuclear Beauty Parlor, filmmaker, producer and cinematographer, known for her 2009 documentary Training Rules
- Henry Yuk (B.A. 1972), veteran television and theater actor born in China's Guangdong Province and raised in Brooklyn
- Jason Zimbler (M.F.A. 2005), environmentalist, former child actor, best known for Clarissa Explains It All (1991–1994)
- Joel Zwick (B.A. 1962), theater and television producer, Family Matters, director of My Big Fat Greek Wedding (2002)

== Government, law, and public policy ==
=== Attorneys ===
- Benjamin Brafman (B.A. 1971), criminal defense attorney
- George Carroll (B.A. 1943), lawyer who was important civic figure in Contra Costa County, California and the city of Richmond
- Jay Goldberg (B.A. 1954), trial attorney, formerly a member of the Justice Department in the Kennedy administration
- Robert M. Kaufman (B.A. 1951), attorney, partner with the law firm Proskauer Rose, and former president of the New York City Bar Association
- Harvey R. Miller (B.A. 1954), bankruptcy lawyer with Weil, Gotshal & Manges
- Jay Neveloff (B.A.1971), real estate lawyer with the law firm Kramer Levin Naftalis & Frankel known for representing Donald Trump and his companies.
- Emanuel Quint (B.A. 1949), rabbi, lawyer, and co-founder of Touro College

=== Public policy, labor leadership, and politics ===
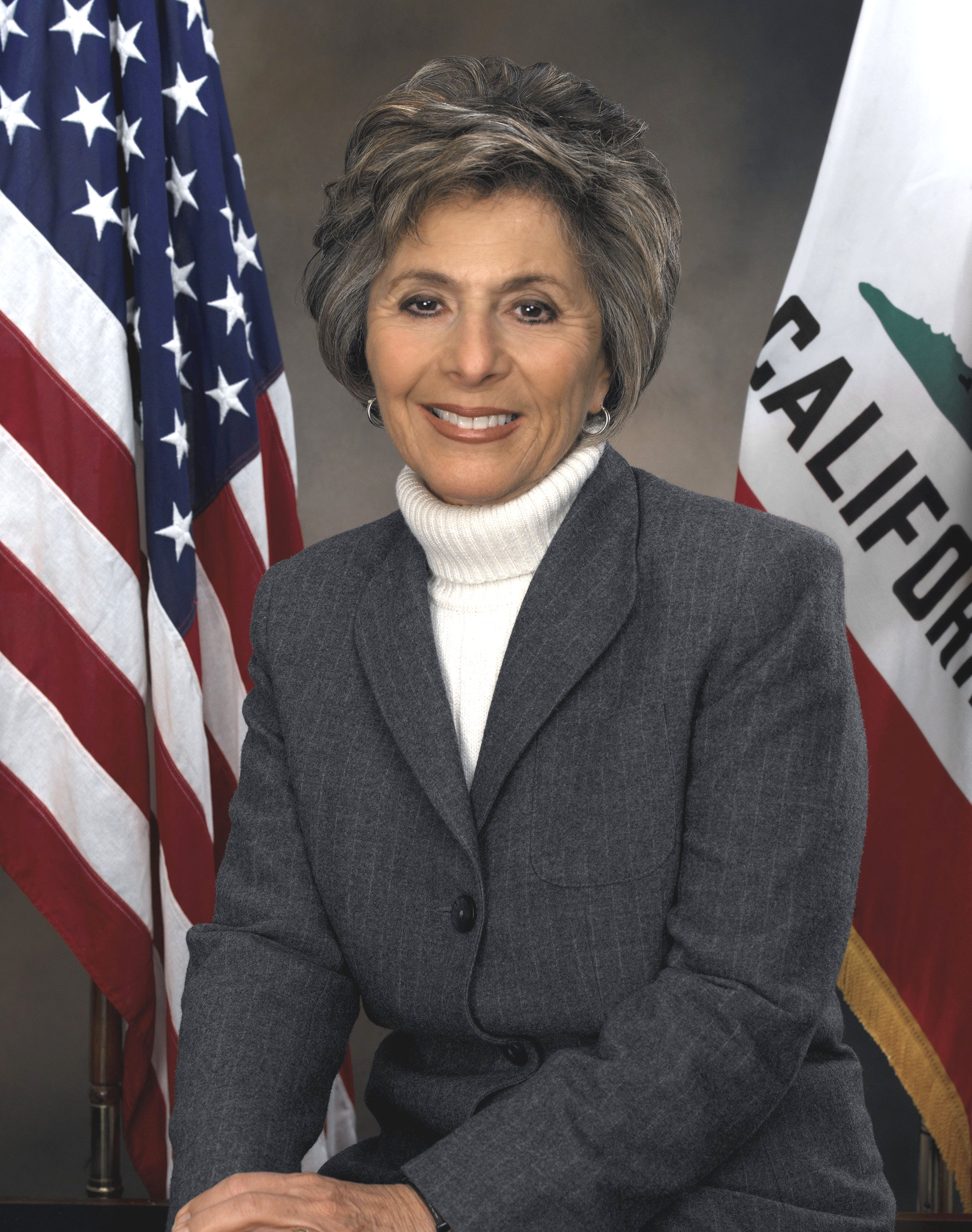
Barbara Boxer

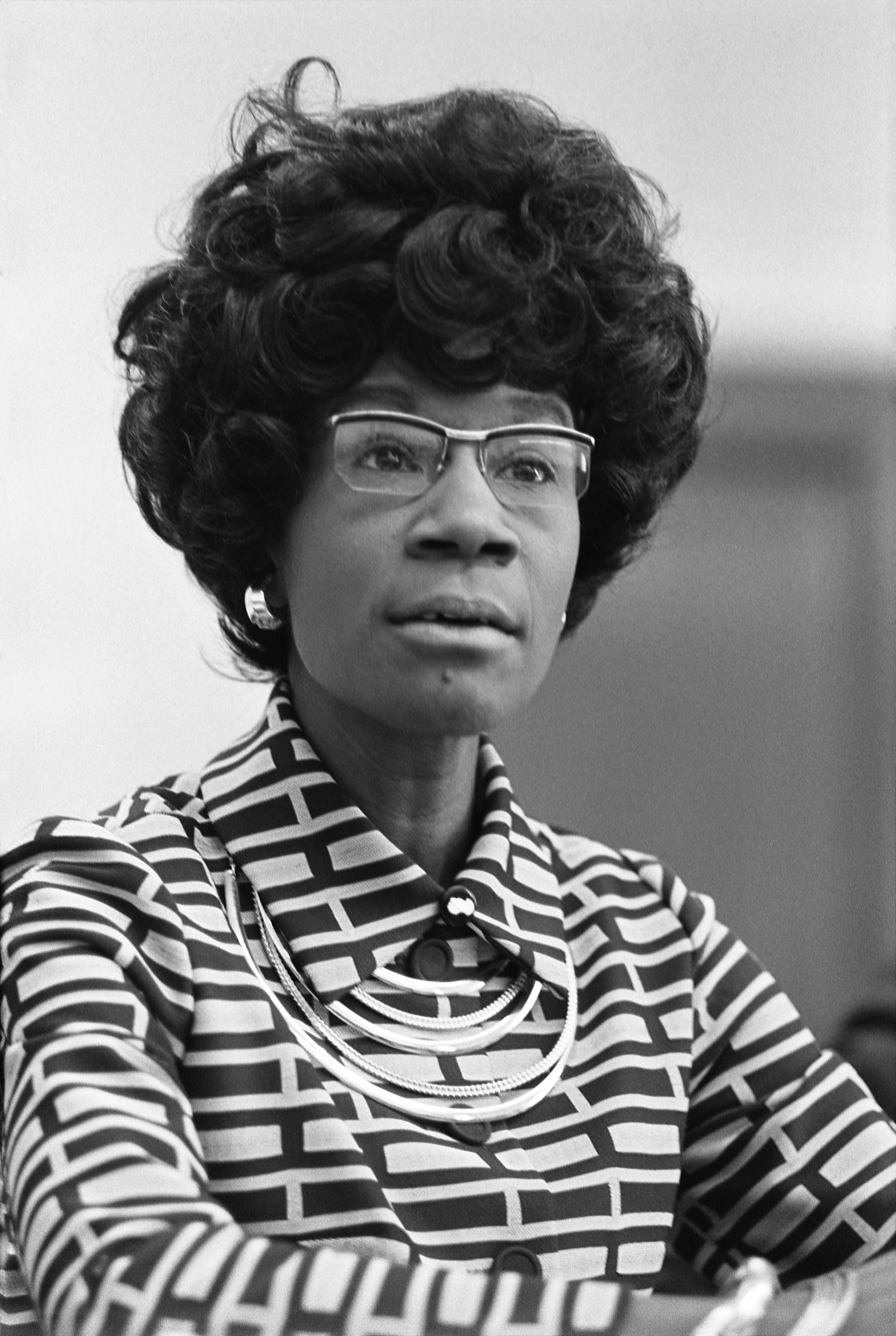
Shirley Chisholm

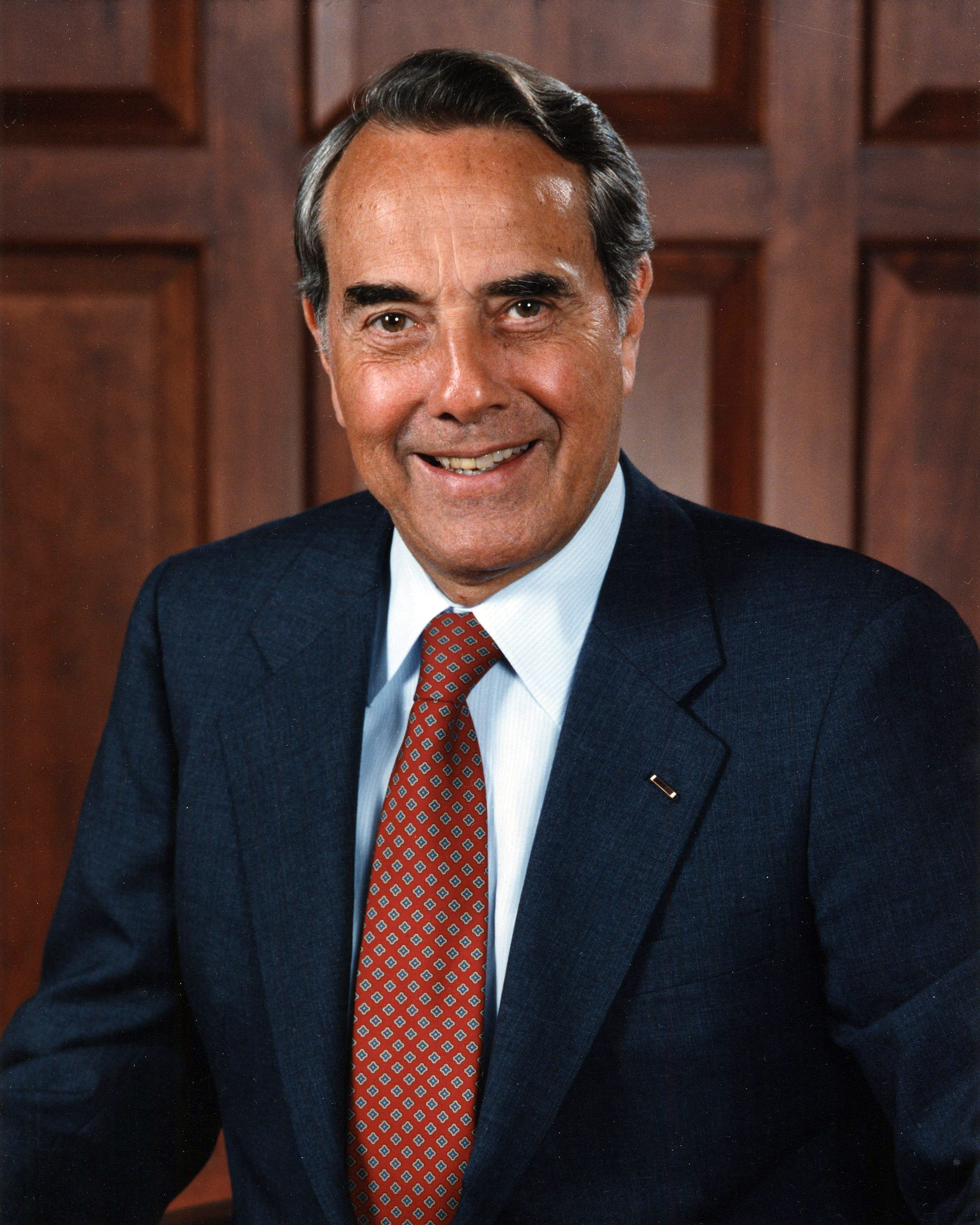
Bob Dole

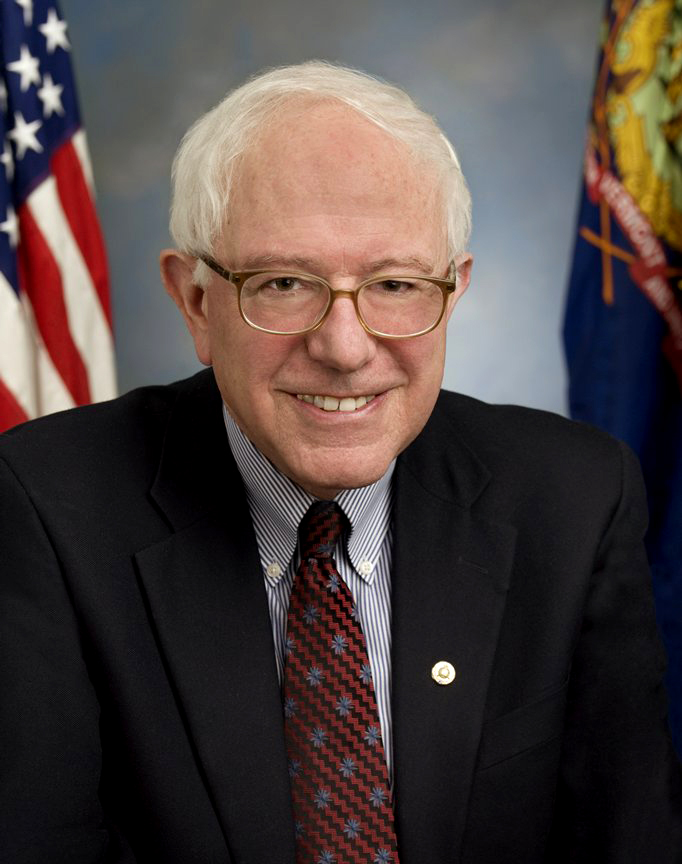
Bernie Sanders

- Cy A Adler (B.A. 1950), president of Shorewalkers, Inc.; author, organizer, and conservationist, advocate for shoreline issues in and around New York City
- Susan Alter (B.A. 1964), politician who served in the New York City Council 1978–1993; first Orthodox Jewish woman to serve there
- Dionisia Amaya (Adv. Cert. 1987), teacher and Honduran Garifuna community activist
- Bill Baird (B.A. 1955), reproductive rights activist and co-director of the Pro Choice League
- Barbara P. Berman (B.A. 1959), Democratic Party politician who served in the New Jersey General Assembly for a single term, where she represented the 6th Legislative District 1978–1980
- Ruth Berman (B.S. 1955), LGBT rights activist; with her partner Connie Kurtz successfully sued the New York City Board of Education in 1988 to secure domestic partner benefits for LGBT couples
- Dorothy Blum (B.A. 1944), computer scientist, cryptanalyst, and National Security Agency officer
- Barbara Boxer (née Barbara Levy; B.A. 1962), United States representative and United States senator (D – California)
- Frank J. Brasco (B.A. 1955), member of the United States House of Representatives 1967–75
- Marshall Brement (B.A. 1951), career United States Foreign Service officer; United States ambassador to Iceland 1981–1985
- Erin Byrnes (M.S. 2010), member of the Michigan House of Representatives for the 15th district since 2023
- Shirley Chisholm (B.A. 1946), first African-American U.S. congresswoman, 1968–82
- Manuel F. Cohen (B.S. 1933), chairman, Securities and Exchange Commission, 1964–69
- William Colton (MSEd 1971), represents District 47 in the New York Assembly
- Victoria Cruz (B.A. 1982), LGBT rights activist and retired domestic violence counselor
- Donald J. Devine (M.A. 1965), political scientist; author; former director of the United States Office of Personnel Management
- Barbaralee Diamonstein-Spielvogel (B.A. 1952), author, preservationist, curator, and chairwoman of the New York State Council on the Arts
- Martin Malave Dilan (B.A. 1984), represented District 17 in the New York State Senate 2009–19
- Dorothy Dinnerstein (B.A. 1943), feminist academic and activist
- Bob Dole (attended 1943–1944), United States Senate majority leader and 1996 Republican presidential nominee
- Bernard Edelman (B.A. 1968), Vietnam War veteran, author, editor, photographer, documentary filmmaker, public official and curator focused on the experience of fellow Vietnam War veterans
- Sandra Feldman (B.A 1960), president, American Federation of Teachers
- Stanley Fink (B.A. 1956), member of the New York State Assembly 1969–1986; Speaker 1979–1986
- Leonard Garment (B.A. 1946), White House counsel
- Abraham G. Gerges (B.A. 1961), politician who served in the New York City Council from the 29th district 1975–1990
- Phillip Goldfeder (B.A. '04), Democratic New York State Assembly member from the borough of Queens, 2011–2016
- Victor Gotbaum (B.A. 1948), labor leader
- Ari Harow (B.A. 2000), former chief of staff of Israeli Prime Minister Benjamin Netanyahu
- Cynthia Harrison (B.A. 1966), historian who taught at George Washington University and is an advocate for gender equality
- Syed Fahad Hashmi (B.A. 2003), convicted terrorist
- Dov Hikind (M.A. 1981), New York state assemblyman representing Brooklyn's Assembly District 48
- Herbert E. Horowitz (B.A. 1952), American ambassador to Gabon (1986–1989)
- Rhoda Jacobs (B.A. 1962), represented District 42 in Brooklyn in the New York State Assembly (1983–2014), former assistant speaker of the New York State Assembly
- Ellen Jaffee (B.A. 1965), represented District 55 in the New York State Assembly 2007–2020
- Kimberly Jean-Pierre (B.F.A. 2006), represents the 11th Assembly District in the New York State Assembly
- Meir Kahane (B.A. 1954), Israeli-American Orthodox rabbi, writer, and ultra-nationalist politician who co-founded the Jewish Defense League and served one term in Israel's Knesset
- Roberta Kalechofsky (B.A. 1952), writer, feminist, and animal rights activist; founder of Jews for Animal Rights
- Abraham Katz (1926–2013), diplomat, United States ambassador to the OECD
- Vera Katz (B.A. 1955), mayor of Portland, Oregon, 1993–2005
- Ivan Lafayette (B.A. 1951), member of the New York State Assembly since 1977 and Deputy Speaker of the New York State Assembly since 2006
- Sy Landy (B.A. 1952), Trotskyist politician, co-founder of the League for the Revolutionary Party
- Howard L. Lasher (B.A. 1965), New York state assemblyman and New York City Councilman; first Orthodox Jew elected to state office in New York
- Burton Levin (B.A. 1952), US ambassador to Burma
- Mark Lowenthal (B.A. 1969), CIA's assistant director of Central Intelligence for Analysis and Production 2002–2005, where he was a key coordinator and valuator of the National Intelligence Estimate on Iraq leading up to Operation Iraqi Freedom
- Alan Maisel (Adv. Cert. 1990), New York state assemblyman representing District 59
- Marty Markowitz (B.A. 1970), New York state senator; Brooklyn borough president (2001–2013)
- George Martinez (B.A 1998), educator, activist, artist, and hip-hop political pioneer
- Steven Meiner (B.A. 1993), 39th mayor of Miami Beach, Florida
- Mel Miller (B.A. 1961), member of the New York State Assembly 1971–1991; speaker 1987–1991
- Joan Millman (B.A. 1962), New York state assemblywoman 1997–2014 representing District 52
- Elvin Nimrod, Grenada Minister for Legal Affairs and Minister of Foreign Affairs
- Manfred Ohrenstein (B.A. 1948), New York State Senate minority leader
- Joseph Pennacchio (B.S. 1976), represents the 26th legislative district in the New Jersey Senate
- N. Nick Perry (B.A. 1978), New York state assemblyman, District 58 (1993–2022); United States ambassador to Jamaica since 2022
- Seymour Pine (B.A. 1941), American deputy police inspector with the New York City Police Department who led the police raid on the Stonewall Inn leading to the Stonewall riots
- Mary Pinkett (B.A. 1974), first African-American New York City Councilwoman, serving the 28th and 35th districts 1974–2001
- Harvey Pitt (B.A. 1965), chairman of the Securities and Exchange Commission
- Lucille Mason Rose (B.A. 1963), African-American civil servant and first female deputy mayor of New York City
- Robert Rosenthal (B.A. 1938), highly decorated World War II pilot and assistant to the U.S. prosecutor at the Nuremberg Trials
- Gene Russianoff (B.A. 1974), staff attorney and chief spokesman for the Straphangers Campaign, New York City-based public transport advocacy group
- Edward Sagarin (B.A. 1961), sociologist, pseudonymously wrote The Homosexual in America: A Subjective Approach (1951), considered one of the most influential works in the history of the gay rights movement
- John L. Sampson (B.A. 1987), represents District 19 in the New York State Senate where he serves in a leadership position as chairman of the Democratic Conference
- Bernie Sanders (attended 1959–1960), United States Senator from Vermont
- James Sanders, Jr. (B.A. 1984), represents the 10th Senatorial District in the New York State Senate
- Larry Sanders (B.A. 1956), American-British academic, social worker, politician, and former Health and Social Care Spokesperson of the Green Party of England and Wales. He is the older brother of Bernie Sanders, United States Senator from Vermont
- Bernice Sandler (B.A. 1948), the "godmother of Title IX"
- Adelaide L. Sanford (B.A. 1947), educator, advocate for African-centered education; served on the Board of Regents of the University of the State of New York 1986–2007
- Hillel Schenker (B.A. 1961), co-editor of the Palestine-Israel Journal, a Jerusalem-based independent English language quarterly founded and run by a group of Palestinian and Israeli academics and journalists
- Harvey Schlossberg (B.A. 1958), New York City Police Department officer, Freudian psychoanalyst, and the founder of modern crisis negotiation
- Sam Schwartz, aka "Gridlock Sam" (B.S. 1969), transportation engineer, believed responsible for popularizing the word gridlock
- Lloyd Sealy (B.A. 1946), first African-American officer in the NYPD to be the commander of a police station, serving the 28th precinct in Harlem
- Murray Seeman (B.A. 1934), lawyer, real estate developer, and community leader
- Frank Serpico (A.A. 1959), New York City Police Department officer famous for testifying against police corruption
- Al Sharpton (1975), civil rights activist
- Norman Siegel (B.A. 1965), director of the New York Civil Liberties Union (NYCLU), 1985–2000
- Susan Silbey (B.A. 1962), sociologist at the Massachusetts Institute of Technology, best known for her work on popular legal consciousness
- David Sive (B.A. 1943), attorney, environmentalist, and professor of environmental law, who has been recognized as a pioneer in the field of United States environmental law
- Eleanor Sobel (B.A. 1967), state representative in the Florida House of Representatives, 1998–2006
- Gerald Stern (B.A. 1958), judicial watchdog, led the New York State Commission on Judicial Conduct 1974–2003
- Pamela Talkin (B.S. 1968, M.A. 1971), marshal of the Supreme Court of the United States; first woman to hold this position
- William L. Taylor (B.A. 1952), attorney and civil rights advocate
- Seymour R. Thaler (B.A. 1940), member of the New York State Senate 1959–1971
- Mark Treyger (B.A. 2005, M.A. 2009, M.S.Ed 2012), member of the New York City Council, representing District 47
- Beatrice N. Vaccara (B.A. 1943), economist and economic statistician; head of the Bureau of Industrial Economics at the United States Department of Commerce
- Eliezer Waldman (B.A. 1959), Israeli rabbi and former politician, member of the Knesset for Tehiya 1984–1990
- Benjamin Ward (B.A. 1960), first African-American New York City Police commissioner, 1983–89
- John Earl Warren Jr. (attended 1965–66), United States Army officer; recipient of the Medal of Honor for his actions in the Vietnam War
- Iris Weinshall (B.A. 1975), vice chancellor at the City University of New York and Commissioner of the New York City Department of Transportation
- Moses M. Weinstein (B.A. 1934), lawyer and politician
- Warren Weinstein (B.A. 1963), contractor; director in Pakistan for J.E. Austin Associates kidnapped by al-Qaeda in August 2011 and killed in January 2015 by a US-led drone strike on the Afghanistan-Pakistan border
- Saul Weprin (B.A. 1948), member of the New York State Assembly 1973–1994; Speaker 1991–1994
- Jumaane Williams (B.A. 2001, M.A. 2005), Democratic politician, member of the New York City Council 2010–2019; New York City public advocate since 2019
- Maxine Wolfe (B.A. 1961), activist for AIDS, civil rights, lesbian rights, and reproductive rights
- Stanley Yolles (B.A. 1939), psychiatrist, head of the National Institute of Mental Health 1964–970

=== Judges ===
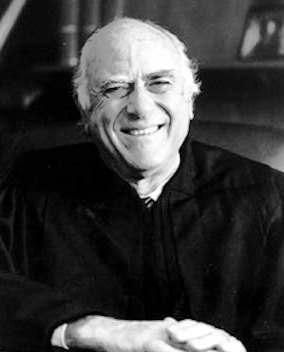
Jack B. Weinstein

- Roger Andewelt (B.A. 1967), judge of the United States Court of Federal Claims 1987–2001
- Noach Dear (B.S. 1975), New York Supreme Court judge
- Patricia DiMango (B.A. 1973), television personality and former justice of the Supreme court of Kings County, New York
- David Friedman (B.A. 1971), associate justice of the New York Appellate Division of the Supreme Court, First Judicial Department
- Arthur Gonzalez (M.S. 1976), United States Bankruptcy Court judge for the Southern District of New York, presided over the bankruptcy proceedings for WorldCom, Enron, and Chrysler
- Sterling Johnson, Jr. (B.A. 1963), senior United States district judge for the Eastern District of New York
- Edward R. Korman (B.A. 1963), senior judge, United States District Court for the Eastern District of New York
- Doris Ling-Cohan (B.A. 1976), judge on the New York State Supreme Court, Appellate Division, First Department
- Rosemary S. Pooler (B.A. 1959), judge, U.S. Court of Appeals for the Second Circuit
- Deborah Poritz (B.A. 1958), first female chief justice, New Jersey State Supreme Court; first female New Jersey attorney general, 1994–96
- Jason K. Pulliam (B.A. 1995; M.A. 1997), United States federal judge for the United States District Court for the Western District of Texas
- Joel Harvey Slomsky (B.A. 1967), United States federal judge for the United States District Court for the Eastern District of Pennsylvania
- William C. Thompson (B.A. 1949), Brooklyn's first African-American state senator; justice of the New York Supreme Court, Appellate Division
- Jack B. Weinstein (B.A. 1943), Columbia Law School professor and senior judge, United States District Court for the Eastern District of New York

== Journalism ==
- Madeline Amgott (B.A. 1942), television news television producer
- Charlotte Brooks (B.A. 1940), photographer and photojournalist
- Stu Bykofsky (B.A. 1965), journalist and columnist for the Philadelphia Daily News
- Thom Calandra (B.A. 1979), founding editor and chief columnist for CBS MarketWatch.com
- John Cigna (A.A. 1956), radio personality at KDKA in Pittsburgh, 1973–2001
- Stan Fischler (B.A 1954), journalist, historian, hockey broadcaster, five-time Emmy award winner, and member of the Hockey Hall of Fame
- Sylvan Fox (B.A. 1951), journalist and Pulitzer Prize winner
- Marc Frons (B.A. 1977), chief technology officer of The New York Times
- Gayle Gardner (B.A. 1969), sportscaster who worked for ESPN and NBC Sports; the first female sports anchor to appear weekly on a major network and first woman to do televised play-by-play of a baseball game
- Dele Giwa (B.A. 1977), Nigerian journalist, editor and founder of Newswatch magazine; killed by mail bomb in his home
- Robert Greenfield (B.A. 1967), author, journalist and screenwriter
- Dorie Greenspan (B.A. 1969), author of cookbooks, New York Times columnist, James Beard Foundation Award award winner
- Yossi Klein Halevi (B.A. 1975), Israeli journalist; columnist for The New Republic
- Charles Lachman (B.A. 1974), Executive Producer of the news magazine program Inside Edition
- Victor Lasky (B.A 1940), Pulitzer Prize-winning writer and syndicated newspaper columnist
- Victoria Law (B.A. 2002), anarchist activist, and writer; co-founder of Books Through Bars
- Don Lemon (B.A. 1996), news anchor, CNN
- Marvin E. Newman (B.A. 1949), artist and photographer
- Stanley Newman (B.S. 1973), puzzle creator, editor, and publisher
- Stanley Penn, journalist, won a Pulitzer Prize for National Affairs Reporting
- Abraham Rabinovich (B.A. 1956), Israeli historian and journalist
- Milt Rosenberg (B.A. 1946), host of Extension 720 on WGN Radio in Chicago, Illinois
- Harold Schonberg (B.A. 1937), Pulitzer Prize-winning music critic and journalist, most notably for The New York Times
- Allan Sloan (B.A. 1966), financial journalist; senior editor-at-Large for Fortune Magazine
- Dorothy Sucher (B.A. 1954), her reporting for a Maryland newspaper led to landmark Supreme Court case, Greenbelt Cooperative Publishing Assn., Inc. v. Bresler, which the paper won; author
- Barry Sussman (B.A. 1956), editor, author, and public opinion analyst; city news editor at The Washington Post at the time of the Watergate break-in
- Maia Szalavitz (B.A. 1991), reporter, author of Help at Any Cost: How the Troubled-Teen Industry Cons Parents and Hurts Kids
- Glenn Thrush (B.A. 1990), journalist, pundit, and author; White House correspondent for The New York Times since 2017
- Gina Trapani (M.S. 1998), tech blogger, web developer, writer, and founder of the Lifehacker blog
- Beatrice Trum Hunter (B.A. 1940), an American natural foods campaigner and writer
- Ekerete Udoh (M.A. 2006), Nigerian politician, former columnist in ThisDay Newspaper, and chief press secretary to Udom Gabriel Emmanuel, the Ibom State governor

== Religion ==
- Arlene Agus, Orthodox Jewish feminist and activist
- Livia Bitton-Jackson (B.A. 1961) academic, author and a Holocaust survivor
- J. David Bleich (B.A. 1960), authority on Jewish law and ethics, including Jewish medical ethics
- Bhikkhu Bodhi (B.A. 1966), American Buddhist monk, second president of the Buddhist Publication Society, 1984–2002
- Reeve Brenner (B.A. 1958), Reform rabbi, inventor and author
- Robert H. Cochrane (B.A. 1948), bishop of the Diocese of Olympia in the Episcopal Church
- Mariano Di Gangi (B.A. 1943), prominent minister of the Presbyterian Church in Canada (PCC)
- Theodore Drange (B.A. 1955), philosopher of religion and Professor Emeritus at West Virginia University, noted for his Argument from nonbelief
- Israel Dresner (B.A. 1948), Reform rabbi who was instrumental in the Civil Rights Movement, and a close friend to Dr. Martin Luther King Jr.
- Sylvia Ettenberg (B.A 1938), Jewish educator and one of the founders of the Camp Ramah camping movement
- Susie Fishbein (B.A. 1986), Orthodox Jewish kosher cookbook author, and cooking teacher
- Satsvarupa dasa Goswami (B.A. 1961), senior disciple and biographer of A. C. Bhaktivedanta Swami Prabhupada, founder of the International Society for Krishna Consciousness
- Blu Greenberg (B.A. 1957), co-founder and first president of the Jewish Orthodox Feminist Alliance; active in the movement to bridge Judaism and feminism
- Jonathan Greenstein (B.S. 1989, M.S. 1991), antique Judaica authentication expert
- David Weiss Halivni (B.A. 1953), American-Israeli rabbi, scholar in the domain of Jewish Sciences and professor of Talmud
- Norma Joseph (B.A. 1966), Canadian professor, Orthodox Jewish feminist, and activist
- Adina Miles (B.A. 2009, M.S. 2012), better known as FlatbushGirl, comedian, activist and political candidate, who has attracted attention for her challenges to Orthodox Jewish standards for women
- Rabbi Yaakov Perlow (B.A. 1955), Hasidic rebbe and rosh yeshiva, current Novominsker rebbe
- Shais Rishon (B.A. 2005), pen name MaNishtana, an African-American Orthodox rabbi, activist, and writer
- Larry Rosenberg (B.A. 1954), American Buddhist teacher and proponent of anapanasati (mindful breath meditation)
- Henry Rosenblum (B.A. 1969), hazzan (cantor) of the Forest Hills Jewish Center in Queens, NY; dean of the H.L. Miller Cantorial School of the Jewish Theological Seminary of America 1998–2010
- Jacob J. Schacter (B.A. 1973), University Professor of Jewish History and Jewish Thought and Senior Scholar at the Center for the Jewish Future at Yeshiva University
- Pinchas Stolper (B.A. 1952), Orthodox rabbi, writer, and spokesman
- Herbert Tarr (B.A. 1949), Reform rabbi who left his pulpit to become a novelist and humorist
- Eliezer Waldman (B.A. 1959), Israeli Orthodox rabbi and former politician, served as a member of the Knesset for Tehiya 1984–1990
- Tzvi Hersh Weinreb (B.A. 1962), executive vice president emeritus of the Orthodox Union
- Joel B. Wolowelsky (B.A. 1967), Modern Orthodox thinker and author and former dean of faculty at the Yeshivah of Flatbush high school
- Isaiah Zeldin (B.A. 1941), rabbi
- Chaim Dovid Zwiebel (B.A. 1975), executive vice president of Agudath Israel of America

== Sports ==
=== Baseball ===
- Hy Cohen, Major League Baseball pitcher for the Chicago Cubs
- Saul Katz (B.A. 1960), president/CEO of the New York Mets
- Sam Nahem (attended 1933–35), Major League Baseball pitcher
- Marius Russo (attended 1932–34), Major League Baseball pitcher for the New York Yankees (1939–43, 1946); All-Star in 1941
- Eddie Turchin, Major League Baseball player
- Richard Wilpon (B.A. 1960), member of the New York Mets board of directors

=== Basketball ===
- Brenton Birmingham (born 1972), American-Icelandic basketball player
- Alex Crisano, basketball player for the Philippine Patriots
- Phil Farbman (1924–1996), basketball player in the Basketball Association of America (BAA) as a member of the Philadelphia Warriors and Boston Celtics
- Nat Frankel, basketball player in the Basketball Association of America (BAA) and the American Basketball League (ABL)
- Fran Fraschilla (B.A. 1980), basketball coach at Manhattan College, St. John's University and University of New Mexico; now ESPN broadcast analyst
- Bill Green (M.A. 1967), basketball All-American
- Mel Hirsch (B.A. 1943), professional basketball player who played for the Boston Celtics, 1946–47
- Marvin Kratter (1937), owner of Boston Celtics
- Johnny Most (B.A. 1947), sports announcer; radio voice of the Boston Celtics
- Joe Nesci (B.A. 1979), head men's basketball coach at New York University 1988-2018
- Tom Sealy, basketball player for the Harlem Globetrotters and in the National Basketball League

=== Chess ===
- Gata Kamsky (B.A. 1999), Soviet-born American chess grandmaster, five-time U.S. Champion, current World Rapid Chess Champion, current US Chess Champion
- Alex Lenderman (attended 2007–2009), Russian-American chess grandmaster; U16 (under 16 years old) 2005 world chess champion
- Max Pavey (M.A. 1948), chess master
- Raymond Weinstein (B.A. 1963), chess player and International Master; US Junior Chess Champion
- Bernard Zuckerman, chess International Master

=== Fencing ===
- Nikki Franke (B.S. 1972), Olympic foil fencer and fencing coach
- Ralph Goldstein (1913–1997), Olympic épée fencer

=== Football ===
- Allie Sherman (B.A. 1943), NFL player and head coach of the New York Giants football team, 1961–1968; president of OTB 1994–1997

=== Soccer ===
- Jonathan Akpoborie, Nigerian soccer player
- Mirsad Huseinovic (attended 1988–92), Yugoslavian-born U.S. soccer player
- Ernest Inneh, Nigerian-American soccer player
- Jan Steadman (B.S. 1978), Trinidadian former footballer, and New York Cosmos player
- Antonio Superbia (B.S. 1994), retired Brazilian-American soccer player and coach

=== Track ===
- Clifton Bertrand (M.S.Ed 1971, Advanced Certificate 1975), Trinidadian sprinter who competed at the 1960 Olympic Games and 1964 Olympic Games
- Pearson Jordan (B.S. 1990), Barbadian sprinter who competed in the men's 100 metres at the 1976 Summer Olympics
- Nina Kuscsik (B.A. 1957), retired long-distance runner; first woman to officially win the Boston Marathon

=== Other ===
- Karen Allison (B.A. 1961), American-Canadian bridge player, winner of five national championships
- Donald Aronow (B.A. 1950), designer, builder and racer of the Cigarette, Donzi, and Formula speed boat
- Irma Garcia (M.S. 2001), athletics director at St. Francis College; first Latina athletic director in NCAA Division I sports
- Akul Ramayani, racquetball player
- Sydne Vogel (B.S. 2009), former competitive figure skater, 1997 World Junior champion
