= Raphael Miranda =

American journalist (born 1977)

- Born: April 26, 1977 (age 49); Bedford Hills, New York, United States
- Education: Brooklyn College; Mississippi State University; New York University
- Occupations: Meteorologist and television journalist

Raphael Miranda (born April 26, 1977) is an American meteorologist and weather producer at WNBC television in New York City.

Since 2009, Miranda serves as a weatherman for Weekend Today in New York, a primary fill-in meteorologist for the weekday newscasts and serves as the host of the Megaphone Interactive Trivia of Saturday Today in New York.

== Early life and education ==
Miranda was born in Bedford Hills, New York, and graduated from New York University with a Bachelor of Arts degree in Spanish, with a concentration in Latin American literature, and a Bachelor of Science degree in broadcast journalism from Brooklyn College. Additionally, he earned a geosciences/meteorology degree from Mississippi State University.

== Career ==
He started as a weather intern at WNBC in 2007. Since then he has appeared on national and local networks including MSNBC, CNBC World, News 12 Westchester and the now-defunct NBC Weather Plus. Miranda was also an occasional meteorologist for Early Today until Weather Plus shut down in December 2008.

== Awards and memberships ==
Miranda won a 2011 Emmy Award for weather coverage of Hurricane Irene.

He is a member of organizations including the American Meteorological Society, NLGJA: The Association of LGBTQ Journalists and the National Association of Hispanic Journalists. Miranda holds the National Weather Association's seal of approval.

== Personal life ==
Miranda, his husband and child live in New Jersey.

== Television ==
| Year | Title | Role | Notes |
|---|---|---|---|
| 2014 | Sharknado 2: The Second One | himself | horror sci-fi comedy disaster television film |

== See also ==
- List of Brooklyn College alumni
- List of meteorologists
- List of Mississippi State University people
- List of New York University alumni
- List of people from New Jersey
- List of people from New York City
