= Gerald Stern (watchdog) =

American judicial watchdog

Gerald Stern (April 15, 1935 - January 6, 2022) was an American judicial watchdog.

== Early life and education ==
Stern was born in the Bronx. Morris, his father, was a coffee distributor and his mother, Jean (Finkelberg), was a homemaker. His father died when he was 7.

Stern grew up in Seagate. He graduated from Abraham Lincoln High School in Brooklyn. He then served in the Army. In 1958, he earned a BA from Brooklyn College.

He graduated from the Syracuse University College of Law. He earned a MA in criminal justice from New York University.

== Career ==
During the 1960s, Stern worked as a trial lawyer for the Civil Rights Division of the U.S. Department of Justice on landmark cases in the South. From the mid-1970s until his retirement in 2003, Stern led the New York State Commission on Judicial Conduct. Over the course of his time there, he investigated thousands of complaints of courtroom ethics and oversaw the discipline or removal of hundreds of judges.

== Personal life ==
Stern married Ruth Gurowski in 1960. Together they had two children.
