= Ekerete Udoh =

Nigerian journalist and politician (born 1963)

Chief Press Secretary to Akwa Ibom State Governor
- Incumbent
- Assumed office May 2023
- Appointed by: Umo Eno
- Governor: Umo Eno

Personal details
- Born: 2 April 1963 (age 63) Onna

Ekerete Udoh (born 2 April 1963 in ONNA, Akwa Ibom State) is a Nigerian politician, journalist, and chief press secretary to Pastor Umo Bassey Eno, the Akwa Ibom state governor. He is a former columnist for This Day newspaper and vice chairman of the News of the World newspaper, Lagos.

== Education ==
Ekerete Udoh attended Queensborough Community College, New York, and graduated with an associate degree in liberal arts before attending Queens College, City University of New York and graduated with Bachelor of Arts degree and finally received a Master of Arts degree from Brooklyn College, City University of New York.

== Honors ==
- Harold Stolerman Award for Excellence in English - 2004
- Joseph Geist Award for Excellence in American History - 2004
- New York State Senate for Outstanding work on Community Relations - 2012

== Nominations ==
- International Scholar Laureate Program in Diplomacy (Golden Key) - 2005
- Urban Fellow-New York City Government - 2005
