= John Castagna =

American geophysicist

John Castagna is an American geophysicist, known for the Mudrock line, currently the Margaret S. and Robert E. Sheriff Endowed Faculty Chair in Applied Seismology at the University of Houston and formerly the Edward L. McCullough Chair.
