= Roberta Temes =

American psychotherapist and writer

- Born: 1942 or 1943 (age 83–84); Bronx, New York City, US
- Education: Union Graduate College (Ph.D), Brooklyn College (B.A.)
- Occupations: Psychotherapist, Author

Roberta Temes is an American author and psychotherapist who specializes in bereavement and hypnosis. She is the author of Living with an Empty Chair: A Guide Through Grief (1977).

== Biography ==
Temes was born about 1942 in New York. She obtained her doctorate in thanatology and psychology from Union Graduate School.

Temes worked as a therapist in Brooklyn. After determining that a number of patients presenting with depression were suffering from grief, Temes established the organisation, Grief Groups, in 1971 to run grief programs. The programs would become a model for similar programs across North America. In 1977, Temes released the grief counselling book Living with an Empty Chair: A Guide Through Grief. She used the book as a training manual for grief counsellors.

In 1978, Temes was contracted by the Barre Granite Association to inform their public relations campaign, and promotion of monuments, with evidence about the importance of objects in the grieving process.

== Critical reception ==
Of her 1977 book, Living with an Empty Chair: A Guide Through Grief, the Oregon Journal said "This is a clear, concise book which outlines a plan in lay terms for the acceptance of death as a normal life crisis."

In 1985, William Weddington, reviewing Living With an Empty Chair: A Guide Through Grief (1984) in the Journal of the American Medical Association (JAMA), noted that "Medical educators and popular writers have ignored the topics of death and bereavement. Only recently have we professionals discovered dying and the bereaved survivors". He went on to say the book, while written "for a broad audience [...] For professionals and students, Temes' work is much too elementary [...] The book is suitable for bereaved individuals and those who prefer a brief and simple introduction to the topic".

Of her book, The Tapping Cure, The Library Journal said Temes "offers an introduction to this self-administered technique, traces its history [...] and discusses how corresponding phraseology can be integrated [...] this book is cautiously recommended for [...] larger public libraries".

== Personal life ==
Temes married her first husband when she was 18. She married second husband, David Lyons, a retired university administrator in 1992; he died in 2024.

== Works ==
- Temes, Roberta (April 2006). The Tapping Cure: A Revolutionary System for Rapid Relief from Phobias, Anxiety, PTSD, and More. Marlowe: Avalon. ISBN 1-56924-324-7.
- Temes, Roberta (1999). The Complete Idiot's Guide to Hypnosis. Indianapolis: Alpha Books/Macmillan.
- Temes, Roberta (1998). Medical Hypnosis: An Introduction and Clinical Guide. New York: Churchill Livingstone.
- Temes, Roberta (1980). Living with an Empty Chair (2nd ed.). New York, New York: Irvington.
- Temes, Roberta (1977). Living with an Empty Chair (1st ed.). Amherst, Massachusetts: Mandala Publishing Co.
- Temes, Roberta (2009). Solace: Finding Your Way Through Grief and Learning to Live Again. Amacom. ISBN 978-0814414637.
