= Isaac J. Winograd =

American geologist

Isaac J. Winograd is an American geologist and an Elected Fellow of the American Association for the Advancement of Science.. He holds a BS in Geology from Brooklyn College, an MS in Geology from Columbia University, and a Ph.D. in geochemistry from the University of Arizona. He received the 1988 O.E. Meinzer Award from the Hydrogeology Division of the Geological Society of America. As a senior scientist with the U.S. Geological Survey, he is best known for advocating for Yucca Mountain as a long-term storage site for nuclear waste.
