= Joe Nesci =

American basketball coach

Joe Nesci (born August 24, 1956) is an American retired basketball coach, formerly the head men's basketball coach at New York University. He retired following the 2017–18 season after 30 seasons leading the Violets.
