= Milton Fisher =

American lawyer

Milton Fisher (1917–2001) was an American attorney, investment banker, author, teacher, and matchmaker. The Milton Fisher Scholarship for Innovation and Creativity was created at the Community Foundation for Greater New Haven in Fisher's name in 2003. Fisher is the father of professor and author Shelley Fisher Fishkin. He married the former Carol Plaine in 1978. His marriage to the former Renée Breger, his college sweetheart, ended with her death in 1976.

== Career ==
After graduating from Brooklyn College in 1938 and Fordham Law School in 1942, Milton Fisher practiced law in New York and was also President of A.D. Gilhart, an investment banking firm that he founded. He taught an extremely popular Adult Education class in "Applied Creativity" in Westport, Connecticut for decades. His avocation was matchmaking, and he was celebrated for having introduced dozens of couples. Before moving to Connecticut in 1960, he was active in civic affairs in Brooklyn, New York, where he was Chairman of the Bedford District Health Center, President of the Men's Club of Union Temple, chairman of the Association for a Brooklyn Ice Rink, and president of the Board of the Eastern Parkway-Crown Heights Division of Brooklyn Jewish Community Council. Between 1960 and his death in 2001, he commuted daily between Westport, Connecticut and Manhattan, and was renowned on Conrail/Metro-North as the creator of "Dream Wednesday," a weekly dream discussion group on the train that continued for years.

== Published books ==
- How to Make Big Money in the Over-the-Counter Market (Morrow, 1970)
- Intuition: How to Use It for Success and Happiness (E. P. Dutton, 1981)
- Haven't You Been Single Long Enough?: A Practical Guide for Men or Women Who Want to Get Married (Bard Press, 1992)
- Intuition: How To Use it In Your Life (Wildcat Publishing Company, 1995)
- The Wonderful World of Wall Street: Where Ordinary People Can Become Quiet Millionaires (Wildcat Publishing Company, 1998)
