= Martin Lemelman =

American graphic novelist

Martin Lemelman (born October 26, 1950) is an American freelance illustrator and graphic memoirist.

== Early life and education ==
Born in Brooklyn, New York City, where he grew up in an Orthodox Jewish home, and attended a yeshiva. At age 13, he decided he wanted to be an artist. His training in art began after entering Brooklyn College, where he received undergraduate and Masters of Fine Arts degrees. Since 1976 he has been a freelance illustrator.

== Career ==
Lemelman has illustrated over 30 children's books and his work has been published in magazines ranging from The New York Times Book Review to Sesame Street Magazine.

He is the author of two graphic memoirs. The child of Holocaust survivors, in 1989 he began to videotape his mother, Gusta, as she opened up about her 1930s Polish childhood and her eventual escape from Nazi persecution. His original idea was to save his mother's memories for his children. Prodded by a 2000 visit to Hermakivka, Gusta's town in Ukraine, he realized he had to tell her story. He returned to it in 2003, and it evolved into the 2006 graphic memoir, Mendel's Daughter, that has been called a unique contributor to Holocaust literature. He used a multimedia approach, using photos and documents, so that the reader would understand that what happened to Gusta happened to real people. Through this approach, Lemelman has Gusta inform the reader about her life and the people in it, as well as her emotional investment in what is pictured. In 2013 Entertainment Weekly listed Mendel's Daughter as one of the ten greatest graphic novels ever written. In Two Cents Plain: My Brooklyn Childhood he continued the family saga. Raised in the back of a candy store in Brownsville in the 50s and 60s, as the neighborhood changed, he tells the story of his childhood in the form of a graphic memoir. Two Cents Plain won the 2010 New York City Book Award for memoir.

Lemelman is emeritus professor of communication design at Kutztown University of Pennsylvania.

In 1985 he designed five postage stamps for Sierra Leone promoting the 1986 FIFA World Cup.

== Personal ==
Lemelman lives in South Florida. He is married with four sons.
