= Akul Ramayani =

American racquetball player

Personal information
- National team: (United States) USA
- Citizenship: American
- Born: April 12, 2002 (age 24) Poughkeepsie, New York, United States
- Education: SUNY Downstate Medical Center; Brooklyn College; LaGrange Middle School
- Height: 6 ft 3 in (191 cm)

Sport
- Sport: Racquetball
- College team: Brooklyn College
- Team: USA
- Coached by: Jim Winterton

Achievements and titles
- Highest world ranking: 1st

Akul Ramayani (born 12 April 2002) is an American racquetball player, and entrepreneur from Poughkeepsie, New York. A three-time Junior World Champion and eight-time USA national gold medalist, he was named the 2018 USA Racquetball Junior Athlete of the Year. He also holds the distinction of being the youngest athlete to win the Open Division of the New York Racquetball Regional Tournament.

He has received four times the United States Olympic Training Center invite.

== Early life and education ==
Born in Poughkeepsie, New York, Ramayani grew up in LaGrange and attended LaGrange Middle School, Arlington High School and later joined Brooklyn College.

He discovered racquetball at age 8 through a recreational center, initially intending to play tennis. With coaching from his father, Atul Ramayani, and mentorship from local players, he quickly excelled in the sport. In 2020, he enrolled in Brooklyn College’s competitive 8-year BA/MD program, aiming for a career in medicine inspired by his racquetball mentor’s recovery from knee surgery. As of 2024, he is pursuing a combined MD/MPH degree at SUNY Downstate Health Sciences University.

== Racquetball career ==
Ramayani began competing in racquetball tournaments at age 10, winning his first national championship at 11 in the 2013 Wilson Junior Olympics. He went on to become a six-time All-American, three-time Junior World Champion, and eight-time USA National Gold Medalist. In 2017, he won three gold medals at the National Guard Junior Olympic Championships in Stockton, California, in the boys’ 16-and-under singles, 14-and-under singles, and 14-and-under doubles with partner Antonio Rojas.

In 2014, at age 12, Ramayani competed in the New Jersey Open Men’s Professional Racquetball Tournament and represented Team USA at the World Junior Racquetball Championships in Cali, Colombia, earning a bronze medal in the 12-and-under division and team MVP honors. He was ranked No. 1 in New York for the 12-, 14-, and 16-and-under divisions and No. 1 nationally in the 12-and-under division. In 2018, he was named USA Racquetball Junior Athlete of the Year for winning three gold medals at Nationals and two at Junior Worlds.

Known for his height (6’3”), which is atypical for racquetball’s preference for shorter players, Ramayani leverages his reach and self-discipline in the fast-paced sport. He has also served as an ambassador for brands like Quest Nutrition, SaltStick, and SARA Watches.

== Other ventures ==
Ramayani is a co-founder of AMEER, a startup, and has been involved with Nitrility. He has also explored pickleball, registering as a 4.0-level player in Poughkeepsie. In 2024, he was noted as an influencer for Adidas.
