= Emil Cadoo =

American photographer (1926–2002)

Emil Cadoo, self portrait, c.1960

Emil J. Cadoo (1926–2002) was an American photographer.

== Early life ==
Following World War II, Cadoo used the GI bill to study Romance languages at Brooklyn College. He later worked as a photojournalist. Cadoo moved to Paris in the early 1960s. In Paris he worked as a photojournalist for the French magazine Realites, and experimented in theater by writing a script.

== Career ==
Cadoo is known for his multiple exposure works, which were achieved both with in-camera and darkroom techniques. He often photographed nudes.

In 1964, the Evergreen Review published a series of his nude photos in the April–May edition. 21,000 copies of the magazine were subsequently seized by the Nassau County, New York vice squad. The seizure was later deemed "unconstitutional" by three federal court judges, and all of the magazines were returned.

Cadoo is known also for his photographs of Edith Piaf, who said of him that he was "not a photographer, but a poet with a camera".

His work is included in the collections of the Getty Museum, the Metropolitan Museum of Art, and the Museum of Fine Arts Houston.
