= Irwin Silverman =

Canadian psychologist

- Education: Brooklyn College; University of Florida; University of Rochester
- Scientific career
- Fields: Psychology
- Institutions: State University of New York at Buffalo; York University
- Thesis: An experimental investigation of the relationships of self-esteem to defense mechanism preference and persuasibility (1963)

Irwin Silverman is a professor of psychology at York University. With Marion Eals, he has studied sex differences in intelligence from the perspective of evolutionary psychology.
