= M Lin =

Chinese writer

M Lin is a Chinese writer living in the US. Her debut book, The Memory Museum, is scheduled for release by Graywolf Press in April 2026.

== Early life and education ==
Lin was born and raised in Beijing, China; her first language was Mandarin Chinese, though she wrote screenplays and stories in English. Her first encounter with literature was ancient Chinese poetry, which she had to learn how to recite for school.

Lin has a Bachelor of Fine Arts in Film from New York University and an Master of Fine Arts in Fiction from Brooklyn College.

== Career ==
After college, Lin wrote screenplays for six years, including a screenplay "about an unmarried woman's failed efforts to freeze her eggs," but none were produced. Writing in China, she felt unable to write about certain topics, such as the White Paper Protests, due to the threat of government repression. She then pivoted to fiction in late 2020 and began publishing short stories in English. During the COVID-19 pandemic, she began writing The Memory Museum.

In 2022, Lin won the Epiphany Breakout Writers Prize.

In 2023, Lin won the Ploughshares Emerging Writer's Contest for her story "野火烧不尽/no prairie fire can destroy all the weeds," which was selected by Gish Jen. Jen called it a "gutsy and ambitious story ... chronicling the 2022 protests to China's COVID-19 policies—a project fraught with not only political risks but artistic risks, too." In the same year, Lin won the PEN/Robert J. Dau Short Story Prize for Emerging Writers, judged by Venita Blackburn, Richard Chiem, and Dantiel T. Moniz, for her short story, "Magic, or Something Less Assuring," which was originally published in Epiphany. The story had been written for her first MFA workshop. She also won the swamp pink Fiction Prize for her short story, "Shangri-La."

Lin has taught at the Gotham Writers' Workshop.
