= Reuben Gross =

Reuben Elliot Gross (1914–1978) was a prominent American attorney who was a leader in the civil rights movement in the mid 20th century and in the Orthodox Jewish community. A founder of the National Jewish Commission on Law and Public Affairs (COLPA), Gross played a pivotal role in legal battles to ensure accommodation of Sabbath observance under U.S. law with the Jewish Telegraphic Agency writing that he "participated in all of the important legal battles establishing the rights of Orthodox Jews under American law for Sabbath observers".

== Biography ==
Gross was born in the Bronx, New York City in 1914 (the Bronx). During World War II he served in the U.S. Army in Germany, an experience that left him wounded in action and heightened his awareness of the vulnerabilities facing the Jewish people.

He operated a secret Haganah radio from his home in Staten Island prior to the establishment of the State of Israel and, following the establishment of the State of Israel, served in the Israeli Air Force. He was a graduate of the City College of New York and Harvard Law School.

In 1954, Gross became a national officer of the Orthodox Union, serving until his death. He was also chairman of the American Veterans of Israel.

In 1965, Gross became one of the cofounders of COLPA along with Dr. Marvin Schick and Rabbi Moshe Sherer. The organization is a voluntary association of attorneys which represents the observant Jewish community on legal, legislative, and public-affairs matters.

On July 7, 1978, Gross passed away with his funeral held on July 10.

== Family ==
Gross' first wife, Miriam, died in 1950. He remarried in 1951 and his second wife, Blanche, survived him along with four sons and five daughters, along with 14 grandchildren.
