= Zwiebel =

Zwiebel is a surname. Notable people with the surname include:

- Alfred Zwiebel (1914 — 2005), German-American painter
- Chaim Dovid Zwiebel (born 1931), American community activist
- Jeffrey Zwiebel (born 1965), American economist
- T. Herman Zwiebel, publisher emeritus of The Onion

== See also ==
- Zweibel
- Zwiebel, the German word for onion
- Zwiebel, pseudonym of German author Heinrich Hoffmann (author)
- Zwiebel-Look, "onion[-layer]" clothing style of Jil Sander
