= The Economists' Voice =

Publishing forum for professional economists

The Economists' Voice is a publishing forum for professional economists that seeks to fill the gap between op-ed pages of newspapers and scholarly journal articles. Published by Walter de Gruyter, the forum brings to bear scholarly work and academic perspectives on policy issues that are of broad concern. It is edited by Professor Joseph Stiglitz (Columbia University), along with Jeffrey Zwiebel (Stanford University) and Michael Cragg.

Its articles are published by the Columbia University Press.

== Scope and format ==
The Economists' Voice publishes short, policy-focused articles written by academic economists for a broad audience that includes policymakers, journalists, and non-specialist readers. The forum is designed to present research-based economic analysis in an accessible format, positioned between opinion journalism and traditional peer-reviewed academic journals. Articles typically address current economic policy issues and public debates, drawing on established economic research while avoiding technical formalism.

Unlike conventional scholarly journals, contributions to The Economists' Voice are concise and written for clarity rather than methodological detail. The publication aims to facilitate timely engagement by professional economists with contemporary policy questions and to make academic perspectives more visible in public discourse.
