= Mike Tress =

Jewish American organization leader

- Born: Elimelech Gavriel Tress; July 9, 1909; United States
- Died: July 9, 1967 (aged 58)
- Occupations: Communal leader; Entrepreneur
- Organization: Agudath Israel of America
- Title: President of Agudath Israel of America
- Successor: Moshe Sherer

Elimelech Gavriel "Mike" Tress (July 9, 1909 – July 9, 1967) was a Jewish American who served as the national president of Agudath Israel of America from the 1940s until his death. He was a major figure in the movement's expansion and its chief lay leader.

Tress was the son of an immigrant and born in the United States. Without training to become a rabbi, he was later titled "Reb Elimelech" due to his influential work and also known by his nickname "Mike". Before and during the Second World War, he founded various youth organizations to counteract assimilation.

Tress was President of Agudath Israel of America for many years, helping the Union to become one of the greatest political, communal, and cultural representations of the Orthodoxy of its time in the United States. He led the organization until his death; Moshe Sherer, his protege, succeeded him. To finance Agudath Israel and help Jews escape from Europe, Tress gave up his career as an entrepreneur and used his fortune to do so. He rescued many European Jews at the time of the Holocaust through his engagement.

His biographer is the journalist and spokesperson Jonathan Rosenblum, whose work is based in part on research by historian David Kranzler.

In his honor, Agudath Israel awards the Reb Elimelech Tress Memorial Award.

== Literature ==
His life and work are the subject of a biography:

- Jonathan Rosenblum: They Called Him Mike. Reb Elimelech Tress, his era, hatzalah and the building of an American Orthodoxy. Artscroll Publications, Brooklyn, N.Y. 1995, ISBN 0-89906-623-2.
