= Allen Rothenberg =

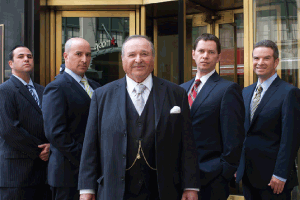
Allen Rothenberg and Sons

Allen Rothenberg is the current president of COLPA, the National Jewish Commission on Law and Public Affairs. He was preceded by Marvin Schick and Julius Berman.

Rothenberg has been recognized by members of Congress for the work he has done to promote justice in American society. In a congressional tribute held on Capitol Hill, Rothenberg was honored for his efforts and accomplishments in advancing greater religious equality in America. Rothenberg helped spearhead the fight to eliminate religious discrimination in the workplace. His work was instrumental in passing new legislation that defended the rights of all employees to observe the dictates of their faith, by obligating employers to make “reasonable accommodations” for their religious employees. Rothenberg has been appointed as a special state Attorney General.

Rothenberg is the founding partner of the Rothenberg Law Firm / InjuryLawyer.com LLP, which he founded in 1969.
