= Agudath Israel of America =

Jewish ultra-orthodox organization

- Founded: 1922
- Founder: Rabbi Eliezer Silver
- Headquarters: New York City, United States
- Areas served: North America
- Key people: Mike Tress; Rabbi Moshe Sherer; Rabbi Yaakov Perlow (d. 2020); Rabbi Chaim Dovid Zwiebel; Benny Fishoff
- Revenue: 11,422,304 United States dollar (2017)
- Total assets: 26,166,707 United States dollar (2021)
- Number of employees: 345 (2016)
- Website: agudah.org

Agudath Israel of America (Hebrew: אגודת ישראל באמריקה; also called the Agudah) is an American organization that represents Haredi Orthodox Jews. It is loosely affiliated with the international World Agudath Israel. Agudah seeks to meet the needs of the Haredi community, advocates for its religious and civil rights, and services its constituents through charitable, educational, and social service projects across North America.

== Functions ==
Agudah serves as a leadership and policy umbrella organization for Haredi Jews in the United States, representing the vast majority of members of the yeshiva world, sometimes known by the old label of misnagdim, as well as a large number of Hasidic groups. However, not all Hasidic groups are affiliated with Agudath Israel. For example, the Hasidic group Satmar, which is vehemently anti-Zionist, dislikes Agudah's relatively moderate stance towards the State of Israel.

Agudah has ideological connections with both Agudat Israel and with Degel HaTorah (Flag of the Torah), two Israeli Haredi political parties that have representation in the Knesset (Israel's parliament). In Israel, Degel and Agudah are in a political coalition called United Torah Judaism (UTJ).

== History ==
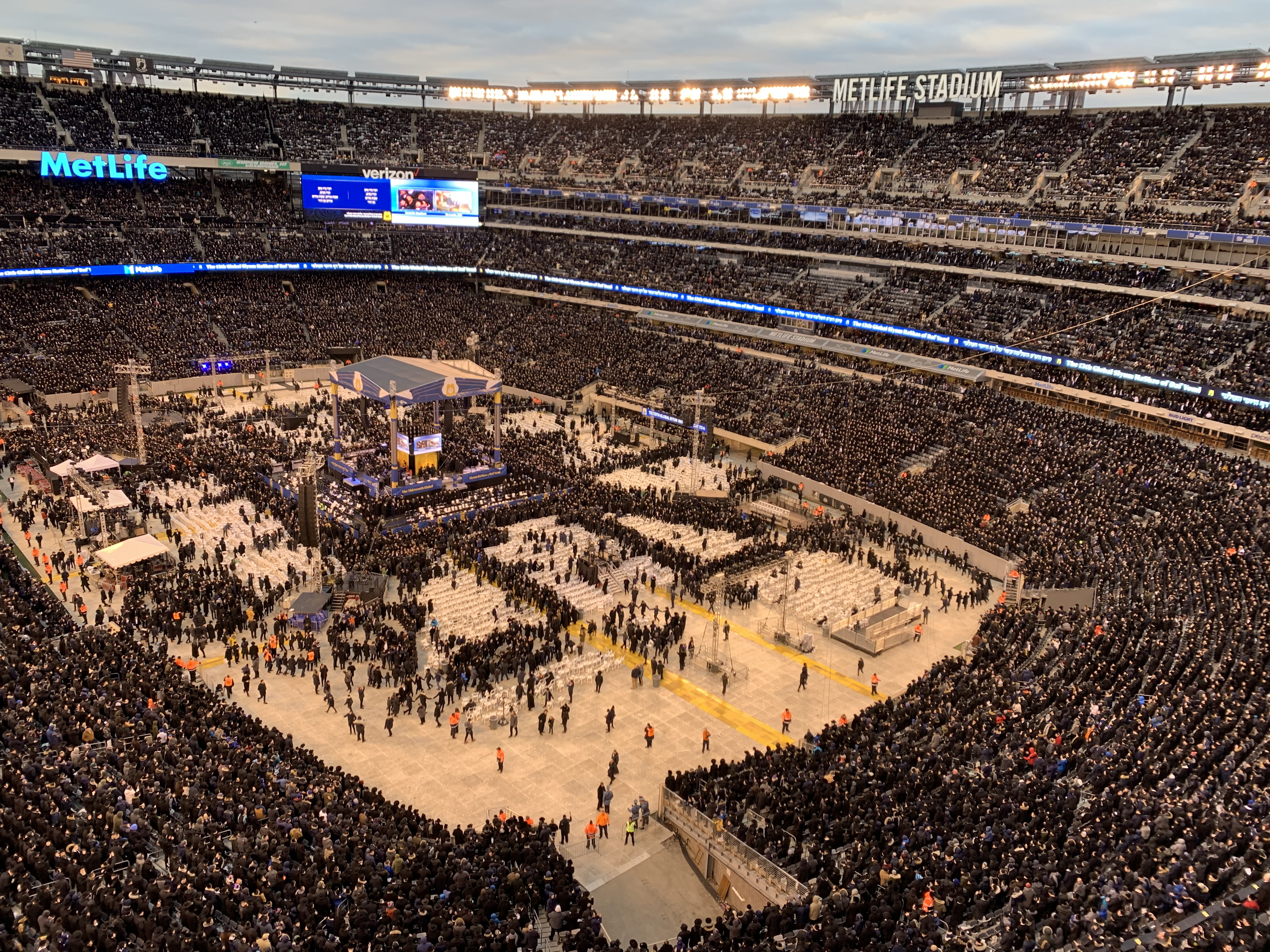
The 13th Siyum HaShas at MetLife Stadium

=== European origins and establishment in America ===
The original Agudath Israel movement was established in Europe in 1912 by some of the most famous Orthodox rabbis of the time, including Rabbi Yisroel Meir Kagen (the Chafetz Chaim), Rabbi Chaim Ozer Grodzinski of Vilna, the Radziner Rebbe, Rabbi Mordechai Yosef Elazar Leiner, the Gerrer Rebbe (the Imrei Emes), and the Chortkover Rebbe. It grew during the 1920s and 1930s to be the political, communal, and cultural voice of those Orthodox Jews who were not part of Zionism's Orthodox Jewish Mizrachi party.

Rabbi Eliezer Silver, an Eastern European-trained rabbi, established the first office of Agudath Israel in America during the 1930s, organizing its first conference in 1939. Some of the early rabbinic leaders of the organization included Rabbi Mordechai Shlomo Friedman, Rabbi Shlomo Heiman, Rabbi Leo Jung, Rabbi Herbert Goldstein, Rabbi Joshua Bäumel, and Rabbi Joseph B Soloveitchik. After the Holocaust, Agudath Israel of America operated under the guidance of the Moetzes Gedolei HaTorah, a council of leading Torah sages. The movement subsequently grew rapidly alongside the expansion of yeshiva-based and Hasidic Orthodox communities.

=== Mike Tress ===
Mike Tress led the expansion of the movement during the early 1940s as its chief lay leader, until his death in 1967.

Mike Tress played a major role in the organization's relief and rescue activities before, during, and after World War II, including efforts to aid Jews in Nazi-occupied Europe and displaced persons in postwar Europe.

=== Rabbi Moshe Sherer ===
His cousin Rabbi Moshe Sherer then took the reins as president, and the organization flourished further in size and accomplishments.

Rabbi Moshe Sherer helped transform Agudath Israel into a significant advocate for Orthodox Jewish interests before the United States government. In 1961, while serving as the organization's executive vice president, he testified before Congress in support of government assistance for religious schools.

=== Benny Fishoff ===
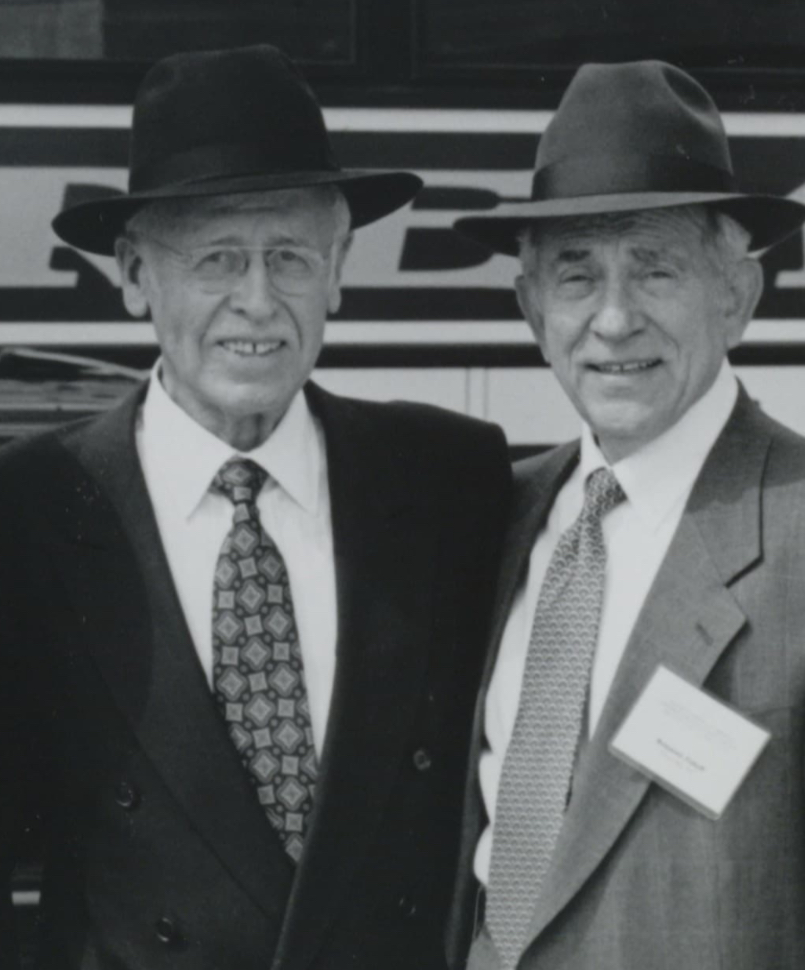
Rabbi Moshe Sherer and Benny Fishoff

Yechiel Benzion "Benny" Fishoff served for many years as chairman of the Board of Trustees of Agudath Israel of America and later became chairman emeritus.

Benny Fishoff was a close associate of Agudath Israel president Rabbi Moshe Sherer and frequently served as Rabbi Sherer's emissary in sensitive matters worldwide on behalf of Agudath Israel and American Orthodox Jewry.

Rabbi Sherer referred to Benny Fishoff as the “Malach Hashalom” (“Angel of Peace”) for his role in helping resolve disputes and in representing Agudath Israel in sensitive meetings with rabbinic and political leaders.

In 2002, Benny Fishoff received the Rabbi Moshe Sherer Memorial Award at Agudath Israel's 80th Anniversary Dinner. The award recognized individuals who had worked closely with Sherer in building Agudath Israel of America.

=== Rabbi Shmuel Bloom ===
After Rabbi Moshe Sherer’s passing in May 1998, he was succeeded by Rabbi Shmuel Bloom, as Executive Vice President.

=== Rabbi Chaim Dovid Zwiebel ===
In 2008, Rabbi Chaim Dovid Zwiebel, having served Agudah as general counsel and director of government affairs, took over as Executive Vice-President. In 2016, his salary was $220,000.

=== Rabbi Yaakov Perlow ===
In April 2020, Agudath Israel of America head Rabbi Yaakov Perlow, the Novominsker Rebbe, 89 years old, died after contracting COVID-19, one month after he urged American Orthodox Jews to follow social distancing and other precautionary guidelines in response to the coronavirus outbreak, saying: "We cannot behave the way we did last week or two weeks ago. We're told that the halakha (Jewish law) is that we must listen to doctors, whether it's about a sick person or Yom Kippur".

== Structure ==
Agudah's policies and leadership are directed by its Moetzes Gedolei HaTorah (Council of Torah Sages), composed primarily of rosh yeshivas (the chief spiritual and scholarly authority in a yeshiva) and Hasidic rebbes (who head Hasidic dynasties and organizations). The Moetzes sets all major policies and guides the organization according to its precepts of Da'as torah (Hebrew: דעת תורה), generally translated as Torah knowledge/direction. Rabbi Yaakov Perlow (deceased), who was the Novominsker Rebbe and a member of the Moetzes, was appointed as the Rosh Agudat Yisrael ("Head of Agudath Israel").

The executive staff includes Rabbi Avi Schnall as COO, Rabbi Chaim Dovid Zwiebel as the Executive Vice President, Rabbi Labish Becker as the Executive Director, Rabbi Naftali Miller as CDO, Rabbi Moshe Danzger as CFO, Rabbi A.D. Motzen as the National Director for State Relations, and Rabbi Abba Cohen as Vice President for Government Affairs.

There are close to one hundred Agudah-affiliated synagogues across the United States and Canada.

== Positions ==
The Agudah takes positions on many political, religious, and social issues, primarily guided by its Moetzes Gedolei HaTorah. It uses these stances to advise its members, advocate for its constituency in the halls of government, and file amicus briefs on behalf of the Haredi Orthodox Jewish community in the United States.

=== Conservative, Reform, and Modern Orthodox Judaism ===
In 1956, for example, the moetzes issued a written ruling forbidding Orthodox rabbis to join with any Reform or Conservative rabbis in rabbinical communal professional organizations that then united the various branches of America's Jews, such as the Synagogue Council of America.

This position was not endorsed by the Modern Orthodox. Rabbi Joseph Soloveitchik of Yeshiva University had initially aligned himself with Agudah, but later established his independent views on these matters and a host of other issues, such as attitudes towards college education and attitudes towards the secular-led Israeli governments. Rabbi Soloveitchik believed it important to nurture the more modern Orthodox Rabbinical Council of America (RCA).

=== Women ===
In 2015 and 2017, Agudah denounced moves to ordain women. It went even further, declaring Yeshivat Maharat, Open Orthodoxy, Yeshivat Chovevei Torah, and other affiliated entities to be similar to other dissident movements throughout Jewish history in having rejected basic tenets of Judaism. Avi Shafran, director of public affairs, wrote: "... women ... assuming positions of public leadership is ... antithetical to the concept of tzniut (modesty)." Agudah forbade ordained Orthodox female clergy from being hired to lead congregations. Dr. Noam Stadlan, a board member of the Jewish Orthodox Feminist Alliance, wrote: "On this issue, the Agudah is irrelevant to Modern Orthodoxy in the same way Satmar or Neturei Karta views are irrelevant on issues of Zionism."

=== Abortion ===
In 2019, commenting on abortion, Agudath Israel said: "Jewish tradition teaches that a human fetus has status and dignity, and that abortion is prohibited in the vast majority of pregnancies", with certain exceptions in which it is permitted and in others where it is required. Other Orthodox New York rabbis offered opposing positions.

=== Vaccination ===
Also in 2019, Agudath lobbied against a New Jersey bill that would have ended a policy allowing New Jersey parents to not immunize their children—because of religious beliefs, but to still enroll them in school. The bill included an exemption for private schools. In the 2018-2019 school year, religious exemptions in New Jersey had grown to 2.6%. Doctors and public health experts had said the bill was urgently needed to prevent the level of measles outbreak that spread across the region in 2018 (the largest outbreak in three decades in the area) and emphasized that there is overwhelming scientific consensus that vaccines are safe and effective.

=== Zionism ===
While Agudath was created as a bulwark to fight against Zionism, the Rabbinic leadership of Agudath did permit "with great reluctance" participation in the government after the Israeli state was established in 1948. The reason given was that "the parliament is not an ideological organization; its purpose is to perform the mundane task of running the everyday life of the citizens of the country. It was against our will that this parliament was formed, and it has the power to interfere with inyanei hadas [religious matters] and to prevent the religious community from living a life of Torah. Thus, we were forced to send representatives there to fight for our survival." Agudah takes stances on issues affecting the Haredi sector in Israel; in contradistinction to the more stridently anti-Zionist Haredi communal organizations.

== Activities ==
=== Political activity ===
Aside from its national branch in Manhattan, Agudah has active branches in the regions of California, Colorado, Connecticut, Florida, Illinois, Mid-Atlantic, Midwest, Missouri, New England, New Jersey, New York, Ohio, Ontario, Quebec, and Washington, D.C. The regional director of each branch lobbies the judicial and legislative branches of their state and local governments on any issue deemed morally or religiously important to their constituency (for example, abortion, physician-assisted suicide, same-sex marriage, school vouchers/school choice). Agudah's advocacy in New York state is led by Rabbi Yeruchim Silber, Director of New York Government Affairs.

Agudath Israel's federal activities are coordinated by Rabbi Abba Cohen, the Director and Counsel of the organization's Washington, D.C. office. Agudah was the first Orthodox Jewish group to open an office in Washington, in 1988, and maintains ongoing relations with the White House and executive agencies, as well as with the U.S. Congress, on various domestic and foreign issues. Agudath Israel World Organization also has a representative at the United Nations.

Agudah files amicus briefs in cases at all levels of the judiciary, often signing on as one of the organization signatories to a brief authored by Nat Lewin or the National Jewish Commission on Law and Public Affairs.

In 2023, Agudah's New Jersey state director Avi Schnall was elected as a Democrat to the New Jersey General Assembly from the otherwise solidly Republican 30th District, in what political commentators called a "massive demonstration" of the Orthodox community's political power.

==== Fingerprinting controversy ====
Official spokesman Rabbi Avi Shafran denied claims by The Jewish Week that Aguda "is opposed to both the mandated reporting and fingerprinting, and background check legislation" then under consideration for teachers of children and cited a memorandum from 2 years prior expressing strong support for the legislation. The difference is Aguda's 2006 support was for legislation that passed in 2007 permitting but not mandating fingerprinting/background checking.

=== Youth services ===
Agudah maintains a network of summer youth camps (including Camp Agudah, Machane Ephraim, Camp Bnos, Camp Chayl Miriam, and Camp Bnoseinu in the Catskills in New York, as well as camps in the Midwest and California).

Sometimes referred to as "Pirchei / Zeirei", this was part of the work by Mike Tress.

"JEP" (Jewish Education Program) is known for its release hour work, and was identified by Rabbi Yaakov Perlow as "the JEP operation of Zeirei Agudath Israel" in a 1977 interview, in which he spoke about "to take off a seder from yeshiva and go out and speak at a release hour at a public school."

=== Social services ===
Agudah has a number of social service branches that cater to the elderly, poor, or disabled. It has a job training program called COPE, a job placement division, and a housing program. The Agudah is responsible for the founding of other national institutions and projects, including the Beis Yaakov girls' school system, and the national Daf Yomi Commission.

== Communications ==
Agudah advocates its positions in several ways:

- Publication of an e-newsletter, Weekly Window
- Publication of a general-interest monthly magazine, The Jewish Observer, from 1963 (no longer published)
- Maintains full-time offices in Washington, DC, and the US west coast, Midwest, and South
- Activism by lobbying and submitting amicus briefs
- Organizes prominent layperson missions to government agencies
- Rabbi Avi Shafran, the official spokesman of Agudah, responds to media articles and statements which concern the Haredi Orthodox community; Shafran also organizes members to do the same
- Conveys its positions in the Jewish media, particularly through privately owned weekly Jewish newspapers in English called "Hamodia" and "Yated Neeman" (distinct from the Israeli Hebrew-language newspaper carrying the same name), which convey news and views from the Haredi Orthodox point of view
- Publication of articles and press releases on its website

== See also ==
- Agudat Yisrael (of Israel)
- Degel HaTorah
- Orthodox Judaism
- Haredi Judaism
- World Agudath Israel
- Jewish fundamentalism
