= Abba Cohen =

American Orthodox Jewish advocate (born 1950s)

Rabbi Abba Cohen
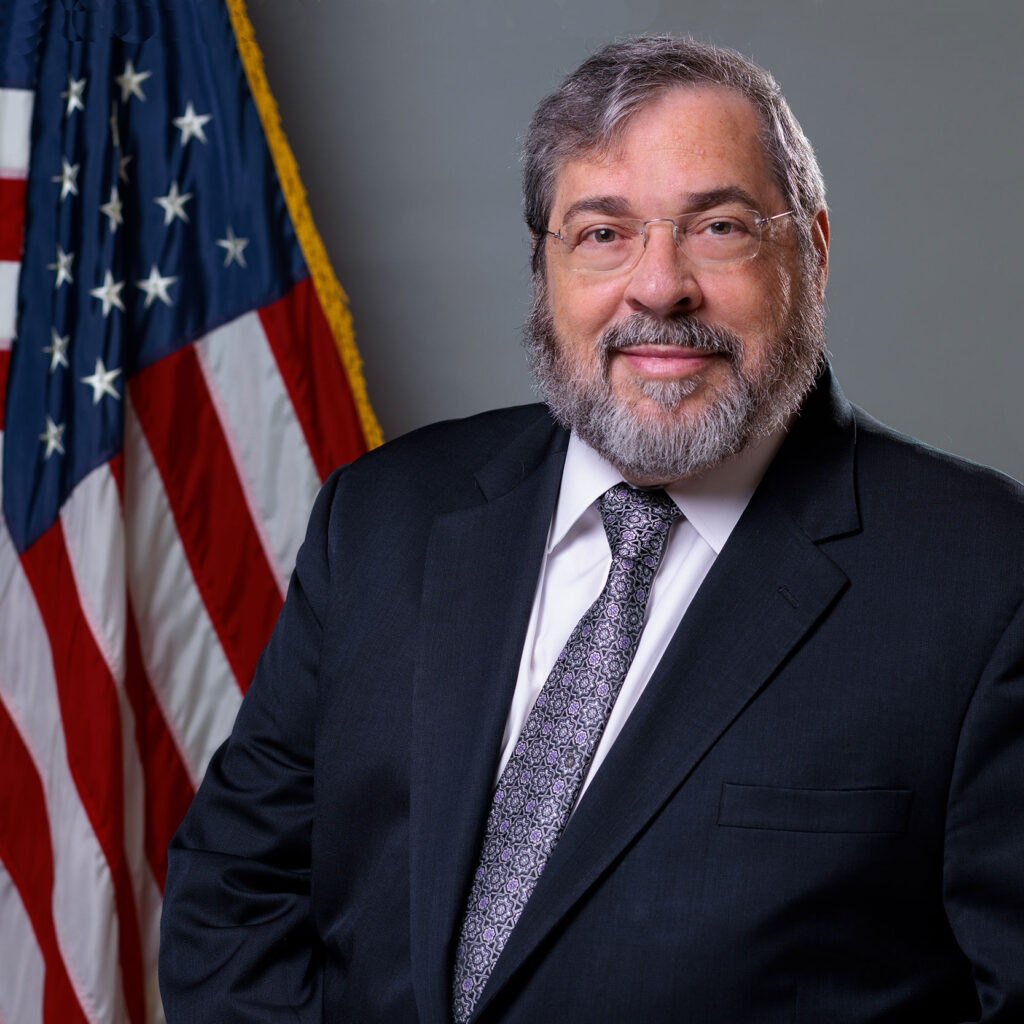

Vice President for Government Affairs of Agudath Israel of America
- Incumbent
- Assumed office February 2019

Director of Washington Office of Agudath Israel of America
- Incumbent
- Assumed office May 1989

Personal details
- Born: 1955 or 1956 (age 69–70)
- Education: School of International and Public Affairs (MIA); Georgetown University (JD); Johns Hopkins University (BS); Ner Israel Rabbinical College (BTL)

Abba Cohen (born 1955 or 1956) is an American rabbi who serves as Vice President for Government Affairs and Washington Office director of Agudath Israel of America. He acts as an advocate for the Orthodox Jewish community in Washington, D.C., and has worked with seven presidential administrations and 19 Congresses.

== Biography ==
Cohen attended Johns Hopkins University, where he received his Bachelor of Science degree, the Columbia University School of International Affairs, where he received his graduate degree of Master of International Affairs, and Georgetown University Law Center, where he received his Juris Doctor. He also received a Bachelor of Talmudic Law and rabbinic ordination from the Ner Israel Rabbinical College.

He began his career at the Anti-Defamation League as an Associate in the Latin American Affairs Department from 1979 to 1981. From 1981 to 1985, he was Assistant Director in the Middle Eastern Affairs Department, after which he joined Agudath Israel of America. In May 1989, he was appointed as its Washington Office director by Moshe Sherer. In February 2019, he was appointed to the wider position of Vice President for Government Affairs.

Cohen's work focuses on issues such as religious freedom, yeshiva education, and combating antisemitism. His efforts have increased awareness about the needs and concerns of Orthodox Jewry within the federal government.

Cohen was honored by the Transportation Security Administration in 2016 for helping to "enhance the traveler experience and ensure the traveling public is treated in a fair and lawful manner by educating the workforce about assisting the Jewish community."

In June 2015, Cohen was appointed as a member of the U.S. Commission for the Preservation of America's Heritage Abroad by President Barack Obama. In January 2021, he was appointed to serve on the Department of Homeland Security's Faith-Based Security Advisory Council.

In February 2025, the Agudah announced Cohen would be stepping down from the organization.
