= Howard I. Rhine =

American lawyer (died 2020)

Howard I. Rhine (חיים ישראל), was an American lawyer, and served for a while as president of the National Jewish Commission on Law and Public Affairs (COLPA). Sabbath observance in work situations was among the areas he helped those who turned to COLPA for assistance. He also served as a senior vice president of the Orthodox Union.

His career included working at the Greenman, Zimet, Haines, Corbin & Goodkind law firm; Rhine testified more than once before the US Congress.

== Family ==
Rhine left behind his wife and their three married children, their grandchildren and great-grandchildren, his married brother and their offspring.
