= Yaakov Perlow =

American rabbi (1930–2020)

Grand Rabbi Rav Yaakov Perlow
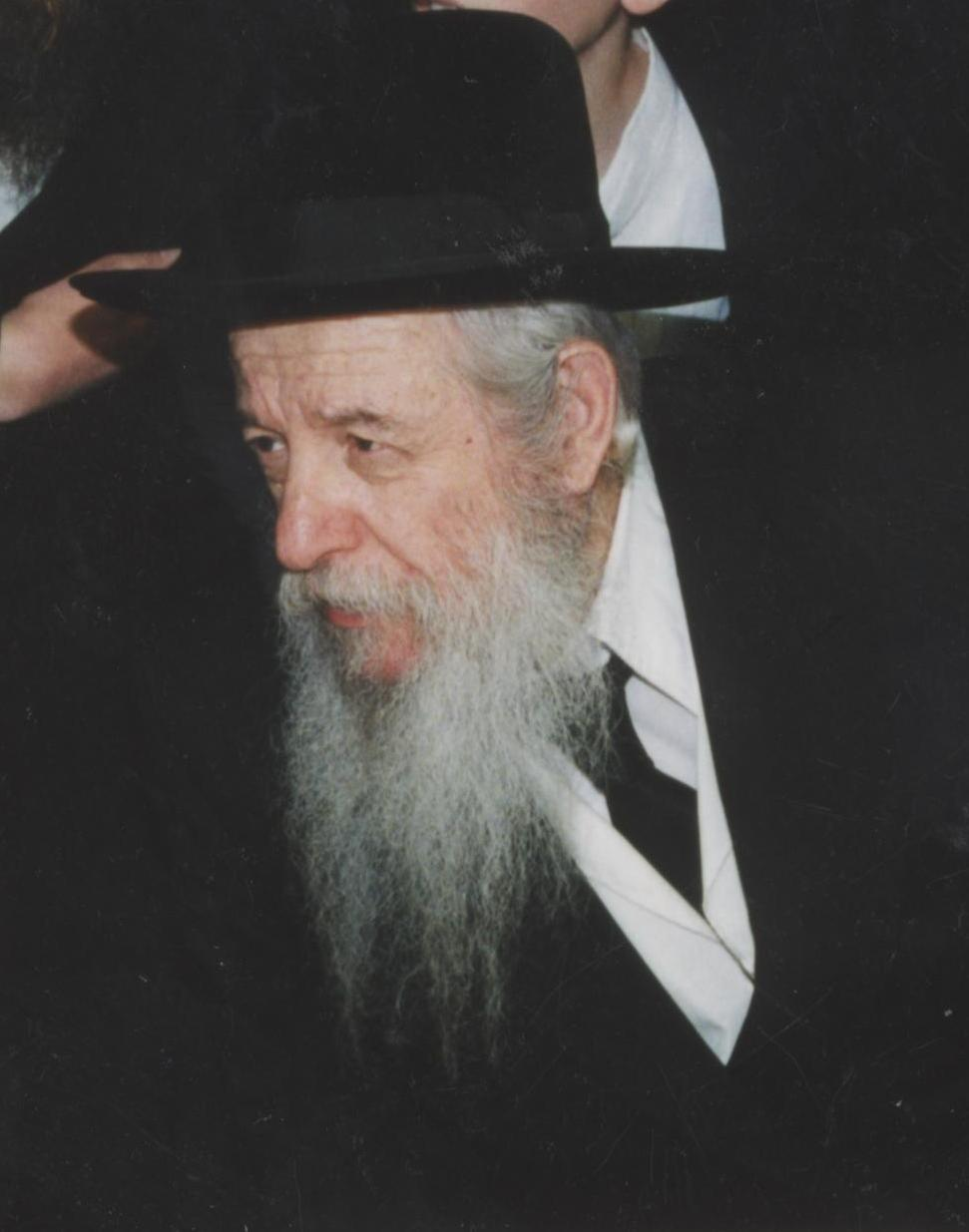
- Title: Novominsker Rebbe

Personal life
- Born: November 16, 1930 Brooklyn, New York, U.S.
- Died: April 7, 2020 (aged 89) Brooklyn, New York, U.S.
- Buried: Mount Lebanon Cemetery
- Spouse: Yehudis (Eichenstein) Perlow (died 1998) Miriam (Eichenstien-Londinski) Perlow (m. 2004)
- Children: Grand Rabbi Yehoshua Heshel Perlow, Grand Rabbi Yisroel Perlow, Mrs.Faigie Horowitz, Mrs. Sara Chana Treiger
- Parents: Rabbi Nochum Mordechai Perlow (father); Beila Rochma Morgenstern (mother)
- Dynasty: Novominsk
- Education: Yeshiva Rabbi Chaim Berlin

Religious life
- Religion: Judaism

Jewish leader
- Predecessor: Rabbi Moshe Sherer
- Yeshiva: Yeshivas Novominsk Kol Yehuda
- Organisation: Agudath Israel of America
- Began: December 1998
- Other: Head of Moetzes Gedolei HaTorah (Council of Torah Sages)
- Yahrtzeit: 13, Nissan
- Residence: Brooklyn, New York
- Dynasty: Novominsk

Yaakov Perlow (Yiddish: יעקבֿ פּערלאָוו Hebrew: יעקב פרלוב; November 16, 1930 – April 7, 2020) was an American Hasidic rabbi and rosh yeshiva, and Rebbe of the Novominsk Hasidic dynasty. From 1998 until his death in 2020, he was president of Agudath Israel of America, a Haredi advocacy organization. He was also head of that organization's Moetzes Gedolei HaTorah (Council of Torah Sages). He was one of the most respected leaders of the American Orthodox Jewish community, known for his scholarly and oratorical skills.

== Early life and education ==
Yaakov Perlow was born in Brooklyn, New York, to Rabbi Nochum Mordechai Perlow (1887–1976), the Novominsker Rebbe, and his wife, Beila Rochma Morgenstern. He was named after his paternal great-grandfather, the Shufra D'Yaakov, founder of the Novominsk Hasidic dynasty. His maternal grandfather was Rabbi Yitzchak Zelig Morgenstern, the Sokolover Rebbe, a direct descendant of Rabbi Menachem Mendel of Kotzk. Morgenstern was one of the main founders of Agudath Israel in Poland.

Perlow began his Torah education at Yeshiva Toras Chaim in East New York, Brooklyn, and continued on to the Lithuanian-type Yeshiva Rabbi Chaim Berlin in Brooklyn, and then Beth Medrash Govoha in Lakewood. He also graduated with honors from Brooklyn College.

== Career ==
After his marriage, Perlow taught at Hebrew Theological College in Skokie, Illinois. He later moved back to Brooklyn and settled in Crown Heights, becoming a member of the administration of the mesivta of Yeshiva Rabbi Chaim Berlin. In 1969, he was appointed rosh yeshiva at the Breuer's yeshiva, Yeshiva Rabbi Samson Raphael Hirsch, in Washington Heights, New York, a position he held for 11 years. He also served as the Rav of Congregation Bais Yosef in that city.

After the death of his father on September 4, 1976, Perlow began serving as Novominsker Rebbe. In 1980, he established the Novominsk Hasidic Center and founded his own yeshiva, Yeshivas Novominsk Kol Yehuda, named in memory of his uncle, Rabbi Yehuda Aryeh Perlow of Novominsk-Williamsburg, in Borough Park, Brooklyn.

=== Agudath Israel of America ===
Perlow became an active member of Agudath Israel of America from 1975, when he was one of the main speakers at the 7th Siyum HaShas in New York. He became a leader of the Torah Umesorah organization as well. In December 1998, Perlow was named president of Agudath Israel of America, succeeding Rabbi Moshe Sherer, who had died seven months earlier. With his appointment, the presidential and leadership duties held by Sherer were divided between Perlow, the new president, and a three-man executive. Perlow was also head of the organization's Moetzes Gedolei HaTorah (Council of Torah Sages).

Perlow frequently spoke out on issues affecting the American Orthodox Jewish world, including Internet usage, child abuse, Holocaust denial, overpriced Jewish weddings, and U.S. politics. In 2015, Perlow shocked attendees at the 93rd annual Agudath Israel of America dinner by directly appealing to President Obama to reconsider the Iran deal.

At the 73rd annual Agudah convention in 1995, Perlow urged dialogue with non-Orthodox Jews while at the same time "lashing out at what he described as the 'false ideology' of non-Orthodox Judaism." In June 1999, he wrote in The Jewish Observer in support of a rapprochement in the long-standing feud between the Haredi and Reform movements. At the May 2014 Agudath dinner, he stated that the Reform and Conservative movements "have disintegrated themselves, become oblivious, fallen into an abyss of intermarriage and assimilation", and branded another movement, Open Orthodoxy, as being "steeped in apikorsos (heresy)". While New York City Mayor Bill de Blasio was the next speaker at the dinner, he did not challenge Perlow's remarks, which cast aspersions on the affiliations of the non-Orthodox Jewish population of New York City.

== Personal life ==
Perlow's first wife, Yehudis (d. 1998), was the daughter of Grand Rabbi Avrohom Eichenstein of Zidichov-Chicago. The couple had two sons and two daughters. In 2004, Perlow remarried to Miriam Landynski, his first wife's sister and widow of Rabbi Yaakov Zev Landynski.

== Death ==
In March 2020, Perlow urged American Orthodox Jews to follow social distancing and other precautionary guidelines in response to the coronavirus outbreak, saying: "We cannot behave the way we did last week or two weeks ago. We're told that the halakha (Jewish law) is that we must listen to doctors, whether it's about a sick person or Yom Kippur". He was soon after infected by COVID-19. On April 7, 2020, he died due to complications from the disease. He was 89. His funeral was held in a private ceremony. The eulogies and saying of Psalms were broadcast live over the telephone, in order to limit the spread of the virus. After his burial, his twin sons were named his successors as Rebbes of the Novominsk dynasty. The elder of the two, Rabbi Yehoshua Heshel "Reb Shia" currently leads his father's synagogue in Borough Park, while Rabbi Alter Yisroel Shimon "Reb Yisruel" leads the Novominsk shteeble in Lakewood, New Jersey. The two Rebbes lead Yeshivas Novominsk Kol Yehuda in unison, with Reb Shia predominantly responsible for the high school, and Reb Yisruel for the Beis Midrash.

== Bibliography ==
In 1982, Perlow published the first of what would eventually be a seven-volume series called Adas Yaakov, with three volumes on topics in the Talmud, three volumes on the Jewish holidays, and one volume on Chumash.

- פרלוב, יעקב (1982). ספר עדת יעקב: חידושים והערות ובאורי סוגיות בשמעתתא דתלמודא ובדברי הראשונים [Sefer Adas Yaakov: Novellae, Annotations and Commentary on Topics in the Talmud and the Works of the Rishonim] (in Hebrew).
- פרלוב, יעקב (2013). עדת יעקב: לחג הפסח [Adas Yaakov on the Festival of Passover] (in Hebrew).
- פרלוב, יעקב (2015). ספר עדת יעקב לחג השבועות [Sefer Adas Yaakov on the Festival of Shavuot] (in Hebrew).

== Sources ==
- Ferziger, Adam S. (2015). Beyond Sectarianism: The Realignment of American Orthodox Judaism. Wayne State University Press. ISBN 978-0814339541.
- Heilman, Samuel C. (1995). "The Ninth Siyum HaShas: A Case Study in Orthodox Contra-Acculturation". In Seltzer, Robert (ed.). The Americanization of the Jews. NYU Press. ISBN 0814780008.
- Helmreich, William B. (2000). The World of the Yeshiva: An Intimate Portrait of Orthodox Jewry. KTAV Publishing House, Inc. ISBN 0881256420.
