= Zweibel =

Zweibel is a surname. Notable people with the surname include:

- Alan Zweibel (born 1950), American television writer, author, and playwright
- Ellen Gould Zweibel (born 1952), American astrophysicist
- Jane Zweibel, American artist and art therapist

== See also ==
- Zweibel Farmstead, a historic estate in Papillion, Nebraska
- Zwiebel
