= Rothenberg Law Firm =

The Rothenberg Law Firm is an American personal injury law firm headquartered in Philadelphia, Pennsylvania. It was founded in 1969 by Allen Rothenberg. The firm has seven offices in Pennsylvania, New Jersey and New York.

== History ==
The Rothenberg Law Firm was founded by Allen Rothenberg and his wife, Barbara Rothenberg, in 1969. The couple have eight children, seven of whom are lawyers and six work at the family firm. Barbara Rothenberg has been the firm's managing partner since 1985 and the Rothenberg family is known for ties within the Jewish community. The firm has represented clients in cases including lawsuits brought by U.S. victims against Qatari banks and charities accused of financing terrorism. In 2020, it recovered $31.5 million for a plaintiff in a settlement with AMC Theatres and in 2022 it represented the family of a man who died at a Philadelphia concert.
