= National Jewish Commission on Law and Public Affairs =

Jewish legal organization

The National Jewish Commission on Law and Public Affairs (COLPA) is a voluntary association of attorneys whose purpose is to represent the observant Jewish community on legal, legislative, and public-affairs matters.

It was founded by Dr. Marvin Schick in 1965, who served as its first president. Successors to Schick included Howard Rhine, Sidney Kwestel from 1975 to 1978, Howard J. Zuckerman who was elected in 1978, and Others who have served in that capacity include Julius Berman, and Allen Rothenberg, its current president.

Dennis Rapps became COLPA's Executive Director in 1970, and continued to hold the role as of 2020.

COLPA has represented, without fee, thousands of individuals and institutions in appearances before Federal and State courts and regulatory agencies throughout the United States and has made presentations before the Supreme Court of the United States, including by renowned constitutional attorney Nathan Lewin.

== History ==
COLPA was founded by Dr. Marvin Schick in 1965, who served as its first president. Rabbi Moshe Sherer of Agudath Israel was an early supporter. According to Schick, the organization grew out of a discussion between himself, Sherer, and Reuben Gross, a prominent Orthodox attorney.

the 1970s, COLPA won several landmark cases defending Orthodox Jews and others who lost jobs over Sabbath observance. In 1973 COLPA intervened when NBC refused to hire an Orthodox Jew who couldn’t work on Shabbat an, NBC agreed to hire the man after COLPA threatened legal action for religious discrimination, acknowledging the legal duty to accommodate his Sabbath observance.

In 1976, COLPA filed a brief to the Supreme Court authored by Lewin, then a COLPA vice president, supporting a 1972 amendment to the 1964 Civil Rights Act requiring employers to make “reasonable accommodation” for religious observances of employees. Also in 1976, COLPA negotiated a historic policy with the Federal Bureau of Prisons guaranteeing kosher meals for Jewish inmates nationwide.

In 1985, COLPA attorneys represented Rabbi Simcha Goldman in a legal battle to overturn a ban on the wearing of yarmulkes by military on duty. Following a defeat in Goldman v. Weinberger, COLPA drafted a bill to overturn the Supreme Court's decision and allow the wearing of yarmulkes which was passed Congress and was signed into law in 1988.
