= Albert Lucas (Jewish activist) =

Orthodox Jewish advocate in the US (1859-1923)

- Born: 1859; Liverpool, England
- Died: 14 June 1923 (aged 63–64); New York, NY
- Resting place: Spanish and Portuguese Synagogue Cemetery, Cypress Hills (Brooklyn), NY
- Years active: 1890–1923
- Known for: Jewish communal activism (on behalf of the poor globally and of Orthodoxy)
- Board member of: Orthodox Union, Joint Distribution Committee, Albert Lucas Association
- Spouse: Rebecca Nieto Lucas
- Relatives: Rabbi H. Nieto (father-in-law)

Albert Lucas (1859–1923) was a Jewish activist and early promoter of a resurgent Orthodox Judaism in America against the Reform Judaism movement. He served as secretary of both the Joint Distribution Committee (JDC) and the Orthodox Union (OU), which was then called the Union of Orthodox Hebrew Congregations of America.

Lucas was born Abraham Abrahamson in Liverpool, England, then raised and educated in London.

== The middle path ==
While a staunch traditionalist, Lucas saw that second- and third-generation American Jews could not sustain the milieu of European Orthodoxy. The pull of American culture was too strong, and the communal walls too weak. He therefore encouraged integration of Orthodox Jewry into America, while parrying assimilation.

While Lucas fought the assimilationist Reform movement, he supported all Jews – whether Orthodox, Conservative, or Reform — in their struggles with discrimination. However, he would not participate in activities involving the Reform establishment, even when the goals were in line with his own. For example, he refused to join the New York Kehillah, initially formed to fight anti-Semitism in the NYPD and promote common cause in the kosher meat industry, because it was a joint effort of Orthodox and Reform congregations.

In contrast, Lucas helped form and direct the JDC. This communal effort against Jewish poverty throughout the world, and especially in Eastern Europe, was supported and run by Jews from all denominations. However, unlike the Kehillah, the Reform movement was not directly involved; many members and officers were Reform, but as individuals, not primarily representing Reform religious institutions. Lucas was one of eight directors, and served as secretary of the board. Practically, though, the JDC was funded by contributions from appeals in all types of synagogue.

The result was that Lucas walked a fine line down the middle between European traditionalists and Reform modernists. Paradoxically, this meant that he was often in conflict with both.

== Causes ==
Lucas was an advocate and leader in the following causes and activities in the United States. Mostly of this activism stemmed from his role as Secretary of the Board in both the Orthodox Union (OU) and the Joint Distribution Committee (JDC).

- Repeal of Blue Laws restricting business on Sundays, a problem for Orthodox businessmen who closed on Saturday.
- Protecting Sabbath-keeping workers from discrimination and reprisals, an infamous problem in the New York garment industry and civil service.
- Keeping religion out of public schools, including a school boycott on December 24, 1906.
- Fighting anti-Semitism on behalf of all Jews.
- Orthodox religious schools, which he spearheaded and personally funded from the late nineteenth century, both prior to and during his OU and JDC involvement.
- Education for girls.
- Anti-missionary work.
- Jewish youth and education.
- World War I relief efforts for European Jewry.

== Education and recreation initiatives ==
As part of his education and anti-assimilation initiatives, Lucas cajoled local synagogues into allowing him to create religious classes on their premises. For example, Lucas served as principal of the Sons of Israel Congregational Sunday School. These "schools" and "associations" borrowed from both the traditional Talmud Torah model and modern education methods.

Lucas also set up Jewish Centres, which combined recreation with Jewish secular and religious activities. These "settlements" combined elements of traditional heder, modern Talmud Torah, and Jewish Community Center. While his Centres did not last, they had a profound impact on evolving Jewish education in America, and helped stem the tide of assimilation.
