= Mordechai Shlomo Friedman =

Ukrainian-born American rabbi

- Title: Boyaner Rebbe of New York

Personal life
- Born: Mordechai Shlomo Friedman; 15 October 1891 Boiany (Boyan)
- Died: 2 March 1971 (aged 79) New York City
- Buried: Mount of Olives, Jerusalem
- Spouse: Chava Sara Heschel
- Children: Yisroel; Malka; Yitzchok
- Parents: Rabbi Yitzchok Friedman (father); Malka Twersky (mother)
- Dynasty: Boyan

Religious life
- Religion: Judaism

Jewish leader
- Predecessor: Rabbi Yitzchok Friedman
- Successor: Rabbi Nachum Dov Brayer
- Began: November 1927
- Ended: 2 March 1971
- Dynasty: Boyan

Mordechai Shlomo Friedman (15 October 1891 – 2 March 1971), sometimes called Solomon Mordecai Friedman, was the Boyaner Rebbe of New York for over 40 years. In 1927 he left Europe to become one of the first Hasidic Rebbes in America, establishing his court on the Lower East Side of New York City and attracting many American Jewish youth with his charismatic and warm personality. He also played a role in American Jewish leadership with positions on Agudath Israel of America, the Moetzes Gedolei HaTorah, and Holocaust rescue organizations. In 1957 he built the flagship Ruzhiner yeshiva, Tiferet Yisroel, at the top of Malkhei Yisrael Street in Jerusalem.

== Early life ==
Born in Boiany, Ukraine, Mordechai Shlomo Friedman was the youngest son of the founder and first Rebbe of the Boyaner dynasty, Rabbi Yitzchok Friedman (known as the Pachad Yitzchok). He was the grandson of the first Sadigura Rebbe, Rabbi Avrohom Yaakov Friedman, and great-grandson of the founder of the Ruzhin Hasidic dynasty, Rabbi Yisroel Friedman of Ruzhyn. His mother was the daughter of Rabbi Yochanan Twersky, the Rachmastrivka Rebbe. He was named after his maternal great-grandfather, Rabbi Mordechai of Chernobyl, and his father's brother, Rabbi Shlomo of Sadigura. He had three older brothers and a sister.

At the age of 10 he was engaged to Chava Sara, daughter of Rabbi Israel Shalom Yosef Heschel, the Mezhbizher Rebbe. They were married eight years later. They had two sons, Yisroel and Yitzchok, and a daughter, Malka.

== Move to America ==
At the beginning of World War I, the Russian army entered the town of Boiany (Boyan) and destroyed the Jewish neighborhood. The Boyaner Rebbe and his family fled to Vienna, where the Rebbe died in March 1917. After the war ended, each of his sons moved to a different country to establish their court. The eldest, Rabbi Menachem Nachum (1869–1936), became the Boyaner Rebbe of Chernowitz, Bukovina. The second son, Rabbi Yisroel (1878–1951), became the Boyaner Rebbe of Leipzig, Germany, and later, Tel Aviv. The third son, Rabbi Avrohom Yaakov (1884–1941), became the Boyaner Rebbe of Lwów, Poland.

The youngest son, Rabbi Mordechai Shlomo, remained in Vienna with his mother until her death in 1922. At that point he entertained an offer to head the Hasidic community of Drohobych in Western Ukraine, and another to lead an organized chaburah (group) of Boyaner Hasidim on New York's Lower East Side. The American group maintained a small kloiz (synagogue) where they gathered on the yahrtzeits of their rebbes. From time to time, this group would send one of their own to visit the Boyaner Rebbe in Boiany and bring back spiritual nourishment for his fellows. After World War I the president of this group, Mordechai Cohen, traveled to Rabbi Mordechai Shlomo in Vienna and begged him to visit the Boyaner Hasidim in America. Rabbi Mordechai Shlomo acquiesced and embarked on an 11-month pilot trip beginning in December 1925, visiting several New York neighborhoods as well as Boston, Chicago and Philadelphia. He was feted with a large farewell gathering at the kloiz before his return to Europe.

For the next year, Rabbi Mordechai Shlomo weighed the pros and cons of relocating to America. He consulted with his uncle, Rabbi Yisrael Friedman of Chortkov, and his eldest brother, Rabbi Menachem Nachum of Chernowitz, who both encouraged him to make the move. He and his family arrived in New York in November 1927. On Hanukkah of that year, the Boyaner Hasidim called a meeting to raise money for the purchase of the building at 247 East Broadway as a kloiz. This building housed a beis medrash with accommodations for up to 175 worshippers. In keeping with Ruzhiner custom, the Rebbe spent most of his time in prayer and study in a separate room called the daven shtiebel (prayer room). There was also a tish room, and apartments upstairs for the Rebbe and his family.

The Boyaner kloiz became an island of sanctity on the teeming streets of the Lower East Side. The Rebbe was a charismatic personality who exuded the sense of nobility and spiritual loftiness characteristic of rebbes of the Boyaner dynasty, yet he also displayed a warmth and paternal concern that appealed to many American Jewish youth who had never seen a rebbe before. The Rebbe inspired quite a number of secular Jewish youth to become ba'alei teshuvah (returnees to the faith). He succeeded in uniting the Ruzhin-Boyan survivors of the Holocaust and proved that Hasidut could be a viable lifestyle in America.

The Rebbe was known for living modestly and simply. He lived in the same apartment over the kloiz for 40 years and did not replace his furniture. Whenever he traveled using public funds, he refused to take a taxi and traveled by subway.

== Leadership ==
The Rebbe took an active role in American Jewish leadership. He was a founder and president of the Agudath HaAdmorim (Union of Grand Rabbis) of the United States, in which capacity he participated in the Rabbi's March on Washington in 1943. He was the first vice president of Agudath Israel of America and a member of that body's Moetzes Gedolei HaTorah. In conjunction with Agudath HaRabbanim, he helped organize the Vaad Hatzalah during World War II and assisted the rescue of Torah leaders in Poland and Eastern Europe. After the war, he was elected president of Vaad HaEzra, in which capacity he raised funds to help Holocaust survivors in post-war Europe. He was respected by every segment of the Jewish world, including "misnagdim, the yeshivah world, baalebatim, the modern intelligentsia…the other chassidic leaders who arrived later to the American shores, as well as the rabbinic leaders abroad".

=== Activities in Israel ===
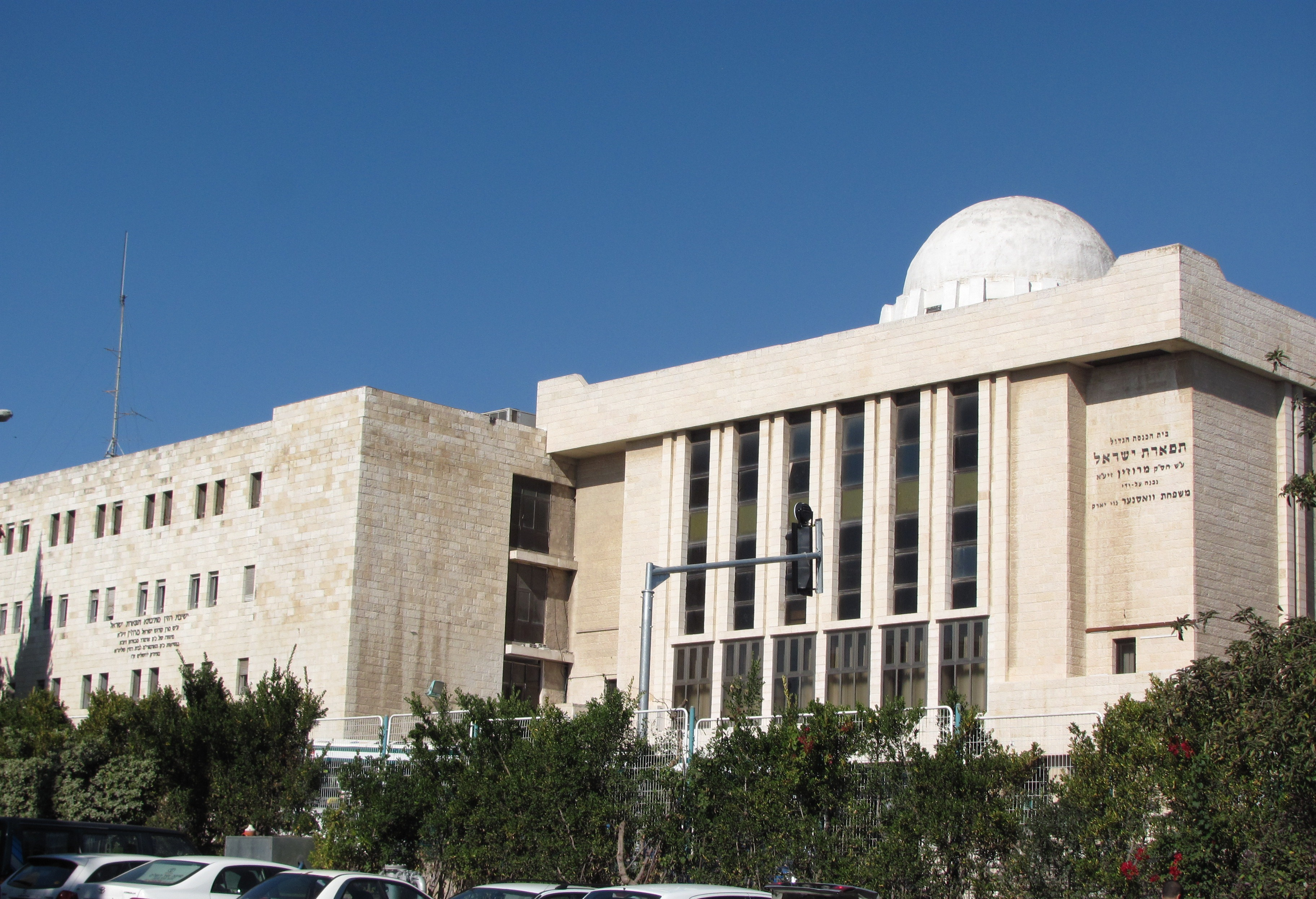
Ruzhiner yeshiva (left) and synagogue (right) in Jerusalem.

Like his father and grandfather before him, the Rebbe served as president of the Kollel Vohlin (Association of Ukrainian Jews in Palestine), distributing large amounts of charity money in Israel each year. He also gave all the pidyonos (redemption-money) he received from people giving him kvitlach to the Boyaner chesed fund, earmarked for the poor in Israel. Like all descendants of the Ruzhiner dynasty, he carried a Turkish passport that identified him as a citizen of Palestine. Although he desired to resettle in Israel, he was unable to do so due to poor health.

The Rebbe visited Israel four times, in 1949, 1953, 1958 and 1960. On his first trip, he visited his brother Rabbi Yisroel, the Boyaner Rebbe of Leipzig and Tel Aviv, whom he hadn't seen in 22 years. On two later visits, Rabbi Mordechai Shlomo took the honor of lighting the first bonfire at the Lag BaOmer celebration at the tomb of Rabbi Shimon Bar Yochai in Meron, Israel. This privilege had been purchased by his grandfather, the Sadigura Rebbe, from the Sephardi guardians of Meron and Safed; the Sadigura Rebbe bequeathed this honor to his eldest son, Rabbi Yitzchok, the first Boyaner Rebbe, and his progeny. During the 13 years that he lived in Tel Aviv, Rabbi Yisroel lit the first bonfire in Meron each year; after his death, Rabbi Mordechai Shlomo inherited the privilege. When he wasn't able to travel to Israel for Lag BaOmer, Rabbi Mordechai Shlomo appointed Rabbi Simcha Kaplan, the Rav of Safed, to light the first bonfire in his stead.

In 1948 the Ruzhiner synagogue in the Old City of Jerusalem, Tiferet Yisroel (also called the Nissan Beck Synagogue), which was completed by the Sadigura Rebbe, Rabbi Avrohom Yaakov Friedman, in 1872, was destroyed by the Arab Legion during the 1948 Arab-Israeli War. On his trip to Israel in 1953, the Boyaner Rebbe of New York laid the foundations for a new Ruzhiner Torah centre in the New City of Jerusalem. In 1957 the Ruzhiner yeshiva, called Mesivta Tiferet Yisroel, was inaugurated with the support of all of the Rebbes of the Ruzhiner dynasty. A large synagogue was built adjacent to it, also bearing the name Tiferet Yisroel. The design of the synagogue, located on the western end of Malkhei Yisrael Street close to the Central Bus Station, includes a large white dome, reminiscent of the domed Tiferet Yisroel Synagogue that was destroyed in the Old City.

== Final years and succession ==
In his last years the Rebbe suffered from severe arthritis and a heart condition. After suffering a stroke in 1967, he moved to the Upper West Side to be near his children. Another kloiz was established on the ground floor of the apartment building where he spent his final years. He continued to see his Hasidim and participate in communal affairs despite his failing health. He died after another stroke on 2 March 1971 (5 Adar 5731). Tens of thousands accompanied his bier in a funeral procession in the streets of Jerusalem to the Mount of Olives, where he was buried at night on the heights of the mountain. His wife predeceased him a few months earlier.

The Rebbe's death left the Boyaner Hasidim leaderless. The Rebbe's brother Avrohom Yaakov, the Boyaner Rebbe in Lemberg, and the successors of his brother Rabbi Menachem Nachum, the Boyaner Rebbes in Chernowitz, had all been murdered by the Nazis, while his brother Rabbi Yisroel, the Boyaner Rebbe in Leipzig/Tel Aviv, had had only daughters and was not succeeded by his sons-in-law.

His followers approached the Rebbe's eldest son, Yisroel, to become the next Rebbe, but he declined. The Hasidim then asked the Rebbe's daughter Malka and her husband, Rabbi Dr. Menachem Mendel Brayer, a lecturer at Yeshiva University, to offer one of their two young sons for the leadership. The eldest, Yigal, an aerospace engineer, was suggested and then rejected. The lot fell to the younger son, Nachum Dov (born 1959), who then enrolled at the Ruzhiner yeshiva in Jerusalem to prepare himself for the task. On Hanukkah 1984, at the age of 25, Rabbi Nachum Dov Brayer was crowned Boyaner Rebbe. The Hasidut is now headquartered in Jerusalem, where the Rebbe resides.
