= Novominsk =

Polish Hasidic dynasty

Novominsk is a Hasidic dynasty, originating in Mińsk Mazowiecki, Poland, and now based in the United States. It also runs a yeshiva known as Yeshivas Novominsk - Kol Yehuda, currently led by Rabbi Yosef Mermelstein.

From 1976 until his death in 2020, it was led by its Rebbe, Grand Rabbi Yaakov Perlow, who served as Rosh Agudas Yisroel in America: The spiritual head of Agudath Israel of America, and was also a member of its Moetzes Gedolei HaTorah ("Council of Torah Sages"). He was succeeded by his sons, Grand Rabbi Yehoshua Heschel Perlow, and Grand Rabbi Yisrael Perlow, as the new Novominsker Rebbes.

== Lineage of the Novominsk dynasty ==
Yaakov Perlow I (1843–1902); 1st Rebbe of Novominsk
Alter Yisroel Shimon Perlow I (1874–1933); 2nd Rebbe of Novominsk
Nachum Mordechai Perlow (1896–1976); 3rd Rebbe of Novominsk
Yaakov Perlow II (1930–2020); 4th Rebbe of Novominsk
Yehoshua Perlow; Rebbe of Novominsk (Brooklyn)	Alter Yisroel Shimon Perlow II; Rebbe of Novominsk (Lakewood)

== See also ==
- History of the Jews in Poland
- Lithuanian Hasidism
