= United States Commission for the Preservation of America's Heritage Abroad =

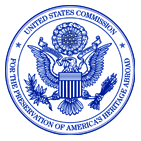

Agency overview
- Formed: August 8, 1985; 41 years ago
- Headquarters: Washington, D.C.
- Annual budget: $770,000 (FY 2026)
- Agency executive: Lesley Weiss, Chair
- Website: www.heritageabroad.gov

The United States Commission for the Preservation of America's Heritage Abroad is an independent agency of the Government of the United States of America. It was established by Pub. L. 99–83. The law directs the Commission to identify and report on cemeteries, monuments, and historic buildings in Eastern and Central Europe that are associated with the heritage of U.S. citizens, particularly endangered properties. The law also directs the Commission to obtain, in cooperation with the U.S. Department of State, assurances from the governments of the region that the properties will be protected and preserved.

In addition to the types of sites specified in the law, the Commission also seeks the preservation of similar types of properties, including related archival material. It, additionally, encourages and facilitates private and foreign government restoration and preservation projects.

The establishment of the Commission recognized that the population of the United States is mostly immigrants and their descendants. As such, the United States has an interest in the preservation of sites in other countries.

The main factors that led to the Commission's establishment were the Holocaust, the persecution of Jewish communities in the Eastern European communist regimes, the forced displacement this led to and the hindered access by Americans who wanted to ensure the preservation of memorial sites in areas under Soviet control during the Cold War.

The Commission consists of 21 members appointed by the President. Of these, seven are appointed in consultation with the Speaker of the U.S. House of Representatives and seven are appointed in consultation with the President Pro Tempore of the U.S. Senate. The Members are appointed for three-year terms, although many have their terms extended, while all continue to serve until they are replaced. They are not paid for their service.

One Member is designated by the President of the United States to chair the Commission. The Chair serves as the head of the agency, directing its operations.

== Appointees ==
Former Chairs of the Commission include Star Jones, Warren L. Miller, Michael Lewan, Rabbi Arthur Schneier, Israel Rubin, and Betty Heitman.

=== Current Committee Members (January 2025) ===
The current Chair, Lesley Weiss, was appointed in January 2025.

- Nancy D. Berman
- Herbert Block
- Rabbi Abba Cohen
- John F. Cordisco
- Joseph Douek
- Emil A. Fish
- Rabbi Edgar Gluck
- Martin B. Gold
- G. Jonathan Greenwald
- Will Inboden
- Thomas Kahn
- Nancy K. Kaufman
- Harley Lippman
- Michael T. Marquardt
- Elizabeth Hirsh Naftali
- Maureen C. Pikarski
- Rabbi Yair Robinson
- Hershel Wein

== Activities ==
The Commission works to restore, preserve, and memorialize cultural heritage properties, including cemeteries, monuments, and historic buildings. Sites are identified by U.S. citizens, federal officials, foreign governments, nonprofit organizations, and Commission Members.

Formal agreements have been established with 25 countries: Albania, Armenia, Austria, Belarus, Bosnia and Herzegovina, Bulgaria, Croatia, the Czech Republic, Estonia, Georgia, Germany, Hungary, Italy, Kosovo, Latvia, Lithuania, North Macedonia, Moldova, Montenegro, Poland, Romania, Serbia, the Slovak Republic, Slovenia, and Ukraine.

== Controversies ==
=== 2015 conflict of interest issue ===
In September 2015, news articles began to question whether a consultant who had assisted the Commission on a part-time basis for many years with the nominal title of executive director in the past had a conflict of interest because he had previously lobbied the federal government for Puerto Rico and Palau. In November, the United States Office of Special Counsel raised issues regarding the Commission's historic use of contractors, including in its hiring of the firm for which Farrow worked, paying it from $80,000 to just over $100,000 a year. The Commission noted that it never had an actual executive director because of funding limitations and it had discussed the contracting and Farrow's role with a range of Federal authorities. It also rejected the suggestion of a conflict of interest because Farrow's lobbying was totally unrelated to the Commission's jurisdiction and pointed out that it had previously sought funding for hiring government employees and flexibility in contracting, both of which it subsequently obtained.

=== 2020 Trump appointment of alleged white supremacist ===
On November 18, 2020, President Donald Trump named Darren Beattie to the commission. He had previously been fired as a White House speechwriter due to alleged white supremacist ties. Numerous organizations, including those representing the Jewish community, objected to the appointment.

== Notes and references ==
- 1). http://www.heritageabroad.gov
- 2). http://www.rickshaw.org/commission.html
- 3). http://jta.org/news/article/2009/11/12/1009143/president-obama-appoints-jewish-preservation-advocate-to-key-administration-post
- 4). http://jta.org/news/article/2009/05/18/1005207/op-ed-europeans-still-need-holocaust-lessons
