= Zivotofsky v. Kerry =

- Supreme Court of the United States

Argued November 3, 2014 Decided June 8, 2015
- Full case name: Menachem Binyamin Zivotofsky, By His Parents and Guardians, Ari Z. and Naomi Siegman Zivotofsky, Petitioner v. John Kerry, Secretary of State
- Docket no.: 13-628
- Citations: 576 U.S. 1 (more) 135 S. Ct. 2076; 192 L. Ed. 2d 83
- Argument: Oral argument

Case history
- Prior: See Zivotofsky v. Clinton for details.

Holding
- The President has the exclusive power to grant formal recognition to a foreign sovereign and its territorial boundaries. Because the power to recognize foreign states resides in the President alone, § 214(d) of the Foreign Relations Authorization Act infringes on the Executive’s decision to withhold recognition with respect to Jerusalem. D.C. Circuit affirmed.

Court membership
- Chief Justice John Roberts Associate Justices Antonin Scalia · Anthony Kennedy; Clarence Thomas · Ruth Bader Ginsburg; Stephen Breyer · Samuel Alito; Sonia Sotomayor · Elena Kagan

Case opinions
- Majority: Kennedy, joined by Ginsburg, Breyer, Sotomayor, Kagan
- Concurrence: Breyer
- Concur/dissent: Thomas
- Dissent: Roberts, joined by Alito
- Dissent: Scalia, joined by Roberts, Alito

Zivotofsky v. Kerry, 576 U.S. 1 (2015), is a United States Supreme Court decision that held that the president, as head of the executive branch, has exclusive power to recognize formally a foreign sovereign and its territorial boundaries; as such, Congress may not require the State Department to indicate in passports that Jerusalem is part of Israel.

The ruling left it unclear whether it also holds for de facto, as opposed to de jure, recognition. The ruling also left it unclear "whether the president’s exclusive recognition power also controls the legal consequences that commonly flow from recognition, such as access to U.S. courts, application of the act of state doctrine, sovereign immunity, and the control of foreign state-owned assets".

== Background ==
=== Foreign Relations Authorization Act ===
On September 26, 2002, the U.S. Congress passed the Foreign Relations Authorization Act. Section 214 of the Act, entitled "United States Policy with Respect to Jerusalem as the Capital of Israel," included various statutes regarding the status of Jerusalem, including invoking the Jerusalem Embassy Act of 1995 to urge the president to move the U.S. Embassy in Israel to Jerusalem, cutting budget authorizations for the publication of official documents "which lists countries and their capital cities unless the publication identifies Jerusalem as the capital of Israel," and authorizing American citizens born in Jerusalem to name "Israel" as their birthplace on official government documents. Specifically, section 214(d) states:

(d) RECORD OF PLACE OF BIRTH AS ISRAEL FOR PASSPORT PURPOSES.—For purposes of the registration of birth, certification of nationality, or issuance of a passport of a United States citizen born in the city of Jerusalem, the Secretary shall, upon the request of the citizen or the citizen’s legal guardian, record the place of birth as Israel.

The section was seen by the executive as conflicting with the long-standing U.S. policy that the status of Jerusalem must be resolved through negotiations between the Israelis and Palestinians.

President George W. Bush signed the act into law on September 30, but issued a signing statement asserting that "U.S. policy regarding Jerusalem has not changed" and section 214 "would, if construed as mandatory rather than advisory, impermissibly interfere with the President's constitutional authority to formulate the position of the United States, speak for the Nation in international affairs, and determine the terms on which recognition is given to foreign states."

=== Zivotofsky v. Clinton ===
Menachem Binyamin Zivotofsky was born in Jerusalem on October 17, 2002, shortly after the enactment of the Foreign Relations Authorization Act. When both requests to list Israel as the birthplace on Menachem's passport were denied (first as "Jerusalem, Israel," then as simply "Israel"), parents Ari Zivotofsky and Naomi Zivotofsky filed suit against the State Department (then headed by Hillary Clinton). The petitioners' case was ruled by the United States District Court for the District of Columbia and the United States Court of Appeals for the District of Columbia Circuit to be unqualified for judicial review as it seemingly posed a nonjusticiable "political question" and would "necessarily require the Court to decide the political status of Jerusalem."

On May 2, 2011, the Supreme Court granted the case (Zivotofsky v. Clinton) certiorari. It was argued on November 11 of that year, with attorney Nathan Lewin representing the petitioner and Solicitor General Donald Verrilli Jr. representing the respondent. On March 26, 2012, the Court reversed the lower court decisions in an 8–1 decision (with Justices Alito and Sotomayor writing separate concurrences, and Justice Breyer writing the dissent). In writing for the majority, Chief Justice Roberts stated:

The federal courts are not being asked to supplant a foreign policy decision of the political branches with the courts’ own unmoored determination of what United States policy toward Jerusalem should be. Instead, Zivotofsky requests that the courts enforce a specific statutory right. To resolve his claim, the Judiciary must decide if Zivotofsky's interpretation of the statute is correct, and whether the statute is constitutional. This is a familiar judicial exercise.

== Opinion of the Court ==
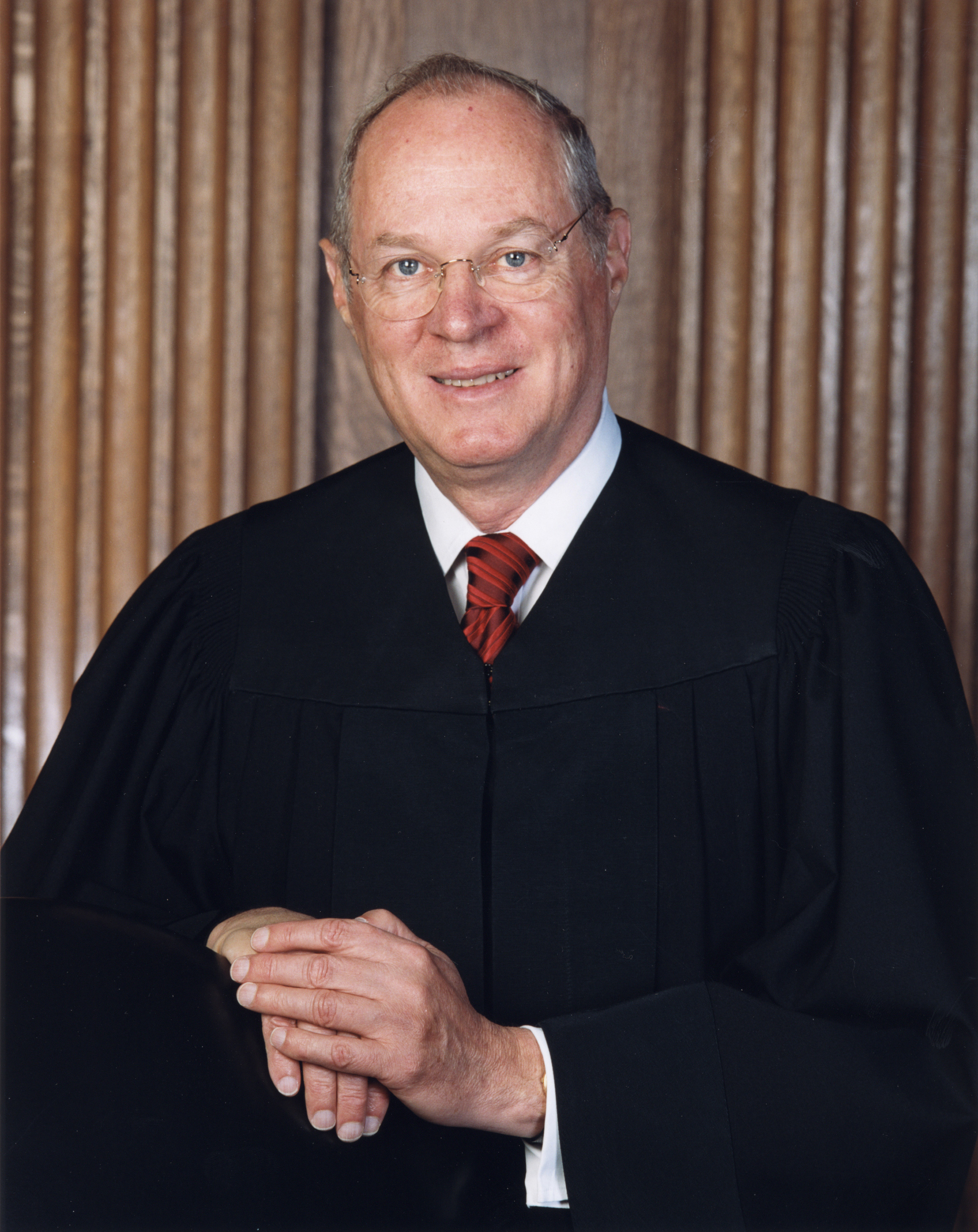
Anthony Kennedy delivered the opinion of the Court

Justice Anthony Kennedy wrote the majority opinion for the Court, striking down the 2002 law and holding that the president has the exclusive power to recognize foreign nations, and that the power to determine what a passport says is part of this power. "Recognition is a matter on which the nation must speak with one voice. That voice is the president's."

Justice Stephen Breyer filed a short concurrence, reiterating his dissenting opinion from Zivotofsky v. Clinton, that the "case presents a political question inappropriate for judicial resolution."

Justice Clarence Thomas filed an opinion concurring in part and dissenting in part. He backed the majority's view on the unconstitutionality of the section 214(d) passport provision but claimed such presidential powers over passports do not extend to consular reports. He wrote the "regulation of these reports does not fall within the President's foreign affairs powers, but within Congress' enumerated powers under the Naturalization and Necessary and Proper Clauses."

Chief Justice John Roberts filed a dissenting opinion and was joined by Justice Samuel Alito. Roberts argued that the Constitution neither conclusively nor preclusively grants the president such power to recognize foreign nations.

Justice Antonin Scalia filed a dissenting opinion and was joined by Chief Justice Roberts and Justice Alito. Scalia argued that the Constitution also grants Congress power to recognize foreign nations by way of the power to regulate commerce with foreign states. Furthermore, Scalia wrote that the 2002 law merely accommodates a "geographic description" similar to other descriptions that the State Department offers.

== See also ==
- List of United States Supreme Court cases, volume 576
- Zivotofsky v. Clinton
- United States recognition of Jerusalem as capital of Israel (2017)
