= Sidney Kwestel =

Sidney Kwestel is an American lawyer who is currently an emeritus professor of law at Touro Law Center, of which he was a founding faculty member. He has served as president of the National Jewish Commission on Law and Public Affairs and the Union of Orthodox Congregations. He is admitted to practice law in the state of New York and, before transitioning to academia, was a partner at Kaye, Scholer, Fierman, Hays & Handler.

== Biography ==
Kwestel attended Yeshiva University for his undergraduate education. He graduated from the New York University School of Law in 1961. In 1981, he was given an outstanding alumni award from Yeshiva University.

In the mid-1970s, Kwestel served as president of National Jewish Commission on Law and Public Affairs (COLPA) as the organization advanced several pivotal legal efforts to secure religious accommodation rights for Orthodox Jews. In 1975, COLPA won reinstatement and back pay for three Sabbath-observant employees fired for refusing Saturday work, including a NYC transit bus driver and two federal employees, setting a precedent for upholding Sabbath observance in the workplace. In 1976, in Cummins v. Parker Seal Co., the U.S. Supreme Court affirmed the legality of the 1972 Civil Rights Act amendment requiring reasonable accommodation of religious practices, an outcome Kwestel and COLPA hailed as a major step for minority faiths. Also in 1976, COLPA negotiated a historic policy with the Federal Bureau of Prisons guaranteeing kosher meals for Jewish inmates nationwide. The following year, COLPA filed an amicus brief in Trans World Airlines v. Hardison, a case that narrowed the scope of religious accommodation by ruling that employers need not bear more than minimal hardship, a setback for observant employees, which Kwestel criticized. That same year, he announced COLPA's support for appealing a court ruling that invalidated New York state reimbursements to religious schools for secular services, laying the groundwork for later legal victories on support to religious schools.

In 1984, he was elected as president of the Union of Orthodox Congregations. In this role, he was known as a vigorous defender of traditional Judaism's views on contentious religious and social issues. In February 1985, when Conservative movement's Rabbinical Assembly announced its first ordination of a woman as rabbi, Kwestel led the Orthodox Union's sharp public response, condemning the decision as a “radical and definitive break with Jewish tradition,” saying it amounted to “religion by popular demand, a pandering to pressure groups." Along with other Jewish leaders, he supported the Supreme Court's decision in 1987 against teaching creationism in public schools.

In 1986, after Kurt Waldheim (whose past as a Nazi had been exposed) was elected president of Austria, Kwestel lambasted the election as “a sad testimonial to the fact that there are many in this world who still wish to forget the Holocaust.” In 1987, he led the OU in boytcotting a planned Jewish delegation meeting with Pope John Paul II in protest of the Pope's audience with Waldheim earlier that year. Under his leadership, the Orthodox Union commissioned a Torah in honor of Soviet Jews which was dedicated between August 5 and 10 in Moscow, Berdichev, Kiev and Leningrad to be entrusted for safekeeping by Jewish community in Kiev. He continued to lead the OU until November 1990.
