= Warren L. Miller =

American lawyer

- Born: Warren Lloyd Miller; July 18, 1944 (age 82)
- Education: American University (BA); George Washington University (JD)
- Occupation: Lawyer
- Years active: 1969–present

Warren Miller (born July 18, 1944 in New York City, United States) is an American lawyer and former chairman of the U.S. Commission for the Preservation of America's Heritage Abroad, the agency of the U.S. Government charged with helping to protect and preserve memorials, historic sites, buildings, cemeteries, and other property in Central and Eastern Europe, including parts of the former Soviet Union, important to the foreign heritage of Americans. While Chairman, he negotiated on behalf of the United States 19 bilateral agreements concluded with governments of the region. These agreements provide for cooperation in preserving sites and commit governments to prevent discrimination against minority groups.

Miller was appointed to the Commission in 1992 by President George H.W. Bush. He was reappointed in 1996 by President Bill Clinton and was appointed chairman by President George Bush in June 2001. During his time on the Commission, Miller made significant contributions to Holocaust memorials and projects throughout Europe including initiating and completing the translation from Polish into English of Auschwitz 1940-1945, a five-volume, 1799-page history of the concentration camp published by the State Museum at Auschwitz-Birkena and for which Miller’s efforts in raising the funds that made it possible, are credited. Notable memorials include "Little Camp" memorial at Buchenwald, Germany; the Rumbula memorial outside Riga, Latvia; the Kielce pogrom memorial, Poland; national Holocaust memorials in Bucharest, Romania, and Tirana, Albania; and the "Hidden Synagogue" restoration at Terezin, Czech Republic. In 1994, he was appointed to serve on the Board of the German government entity in charge of the memorial sites at Buchenwald and Mittelbau-Dora.

Miller has spoken on the subject of Holocaust remembrance and anti-semitism throughout Europe and the United States. He has been a "Newsmaker" speaker at the National Press Club, has addressed a plenary session of the Parliament of Albania, a special session of the Senate of the Czech Republic, and a session of the Chamber of Deputies of the Parliament of Romania. He has been a guest speaker at other national Holocaust commemorations in several European countries. In 2002, he was appointed by Secretary of State Colin Powell to be co-leader of the U.S. delegation to an international conference in Warsaw, Poland on the Museum of the History of Polish Jewry.

Miller has authored op-eds published in major newspapers in the United States and internationally. In 1987, Miller was appointed by President Ronald Reagan as a member of the District of Columbia Law Revision Commission, on which he served for four years. Miller has tried in excess of 100 jury trials in various United States District Courts and briefed and argued more than 30 cases before the appellate courts including the United States Circuit Court of Appeals for the District of Columbia. Miller has lectured in criminal law and has also served on the Board of Advisors of the School of Public Affairs at American University.

== Early life and education ==
Miller received his B.A. degree from American University (recipient of University Student Achievement Award) and his J.D. degree (with honors) from George Washington University. Miller was inducted into Omicron Delta Kappa, the National Honor Society for Leadership. He was elected to membership in the Cosmos Club in Washington, D.C. for being distinguished in Diplomacy and Public Service.

== Career ==
Miller is a lawyer in private practice, and specializes in litigation and negotiation, white-collar criminal matters, and international advocacy. He has represented high-level government officials, Members of Congress and the judiciary, a foreign government, multinational corporations, and the U.S. Government as outside counsel. In these capacities, he has been lead counsel in several cases of national importance, including a defendant in the only espionage case to arise out of the Vietnam War. Miller is a member of the Bars of the District of Columbia, Virginia, and the United States Supreme Court, as well as numerous United States Circuit and District Courts. He is given the highest rating (AV) by his peers in the Martindale and Hubbell Directory. Miller's biography appears in Who's Who in the World, Who's Who in America, and Who's Who in American Law.

== Recognition ==
- Knighthood by the President of Italy with the title of Commendatore of the Order of Merit of the Republic of Italy.
- Recipient of medals conferred by the Presidents of the Republic of Poland (Commander's Cross of the Order of Merit), the Republic of Latvia (Order of the Three Stars with the title of Commander), the Republic of Romania (National Order of Merit in Culture with the rank of Commander), the Republic of Bulgaria (Order of Madara's Horseman, First Class), the Republic of Albania (Medal of Gratitude), and the Republic of Croatia (Order of the Morning Star with the image of Marko Marulić).
- Medal of the Senate of the Czech Republic.
- Commencement speaker and honorary doctorate degree for public service from Central Michigan University.
- Recipient of the equivalent of an honorary degree with the title "Tel Hai Dignitary" from Tel-Hai Academic College in Israel.
- Awards from B'nai B'rith International, the Mayor of the City of Vilnius, Lithuania, the Mayor of Bucharest, Romania, the Federation of Jewish Communities in Romania, and the New York Council of the Society of American Registered Architects.
- National Leadership Award, The United Jewish Organizations of Williamsburg (Brooklyn, NY)
