= Nathan Lewin =

American attorney (born 1936)

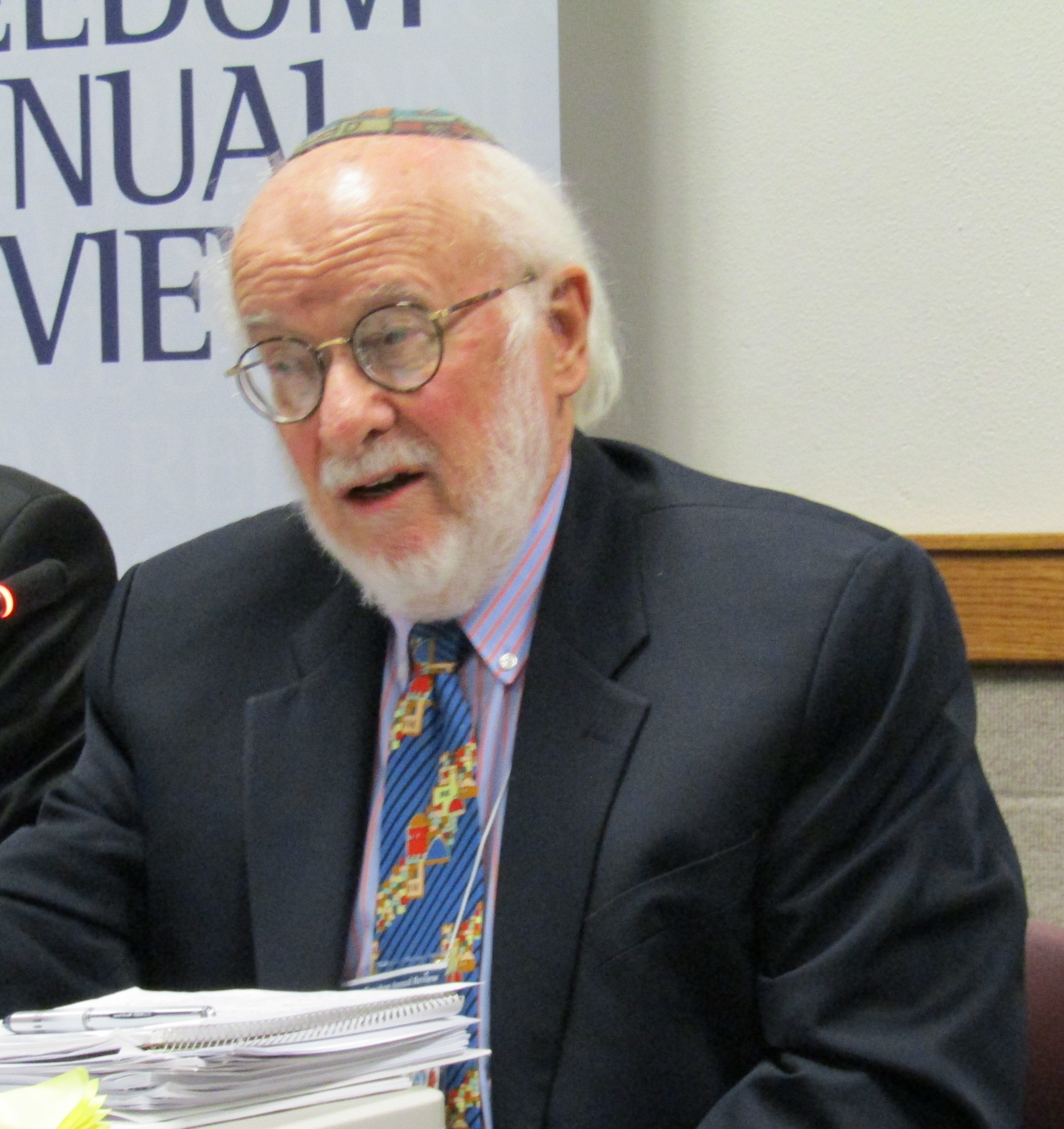
- Born: January 31, 1936 (age 90); Łódź
- Occupation: Attorney
- Years active: 1960–present
- Known for: Supreme Court cases
- Spouse: Rikki Gordon
- Children: Alyza Doba, Na'ama Batya
- Website: https://lewinlewin.com/about/attorneys/

Nathan Lewin (born January 31, 1936) is an American attorney who has argued many cases before the Supreme Court of the United States.

== Early life and education ==
Lewin was born in Łódź, Poland. His grandfather, the chief rabbi of Rzeszow, was elected to and served twice as a member of the Polish Legislature (“Sejm”). Lewin's father, who was elected twice to the Lodz City Council, was later a professor of Jewish History at Yeshiva University’s Bernard Revel Graduate School and a prolific author in Polish, Yiddish, Hebrew, and English.

Lewin's family fled Poland just ahead of the Nazis in 1939, and arrived in the United States in 1941, where Lewin grew up in New York City. He is one of the survivors rescued by Chiune Sugihara.

Lewin attended the Talmudical Academy, now known as the Yeshiva University High School for Boys. Lewin received his B.A. with summa cum laude from Yeshiva College in 1957, and earned his J.D. with magna cum laude, from Harvard Law School in 1960, where he was treasurer of the Harvard Law Review.

Lewin is an observant Orthodox Jew. In 2026, he described a daily practice of reciting Modeh Ani, praying Shacharit and putting on tefillin.

== Career ==
Lewin was law clerk to Chief Judge J. Edward Lumbard of the United States Court of Appeals for the Second Circuit (1960–1961) and to Associate Justice John M. Harlan of the Supreme Court of the United States (1961–1962). Lewin also served as Deputy Administrator of the Bureau of Security and Consular Affairs at the Department of State. While he was an Assistant to the Solicitor General in the Department of Justice under Solicitors General Archibald Cox and Thurgood Marshall, he argued 12 cases before the Supreme Court of the United States. He later served as Deputy Assistant Attorney General in the Civil Rights Division of the Department of Justice.

Lewin also was a part of the prosecution team that won a conviction of James R. Hoffa and represented the government in briefing and oral argument of the Hoffa appeals in the Court of Appeals and the Supreme Court. He also was on the federal prosecution team of the murderers of the three civil-rights workers in Mississippi.

Upon leaving government service, Lewin was a founding partner of Miller Cassidy Larroca & Lewin, later founding Lewin & Lewin LLP, one of the United States' foremost litigation "boutiques" for more than 30 years.

Lewin is admitted to practice in the District of Columbia, New York, the Supreme Court of the United States, all federal appellate circuits, and many United States District Courts. Lewin has argued orally and filed briefs before every federal appellate circuit and has presented oral arguments to the Supreme Court in 28 cases. He has also represented defendants in federal criminal trials.

Lewin currently practices law together with his daughter Alyza D. Lewin, at Lewin & Lewin LLP which specializes in white-collar criminal defense and in federal appellate litigation, and is located in Washington, D.C.

Lewin has practiced law in the District of Columbia, New York, the Supreme Court of the United States, all federal appellate circuits, and many United States District Courts. Lewin has engaged in trial and appellate litigation in federal and state courts for more than 45 years.

Lewin was recognized by the DC Legal Times as one of "Washington's Greatest Lawyers of the Past 30 Years" and was ranked Number 2 of Washington's Best Lawyers by the Washingtonian. He has been voted one of America’s Best Lawyers for 30 years, and was included in the 2019 edition of that volume in four distinct practice categories, including Appellate Litigation, Defense of White-Collar Crime, and First Amendment Litigation. In 2020, U.S. News & World Report announced Lewin & Lewin LLP was among the Best Law Firms.

=== Cases ===
==== First Amendment Cases ====
Lewin has been a champion in advocating for First Amendment rights and civil liberties. He has successfully argued many cases involving the right to display the Chanukah menorah in a public forum, including two such cases before en banc courts of the Sixth and Eleventh Circuits. He represented Chabad in the Supreme Court in County of Allegheny v. ACLU, where the Court held that the City of Pittsburgh may constitutionally include Chabad's menorah in a city display on public property. He represented an Air Force psychologist in Goldman v. Weinberger, the Supreme Court case testing his constitutional right to wear a yarmulke while wearing a military uniform. In 1976, Lewin represented the Hasidic community of Williamsburg in the Supreme Court, in its constitutional challenge to a racially conscious legislative reapportionment, urging a rule of constitutional law that the Supreme Court accepted 20 years later.

He was the attorney for the Satmar Kiryas Joel school for handicapped children in Board of Education of Kiryas Joel Village School District v. Grumet, a case in defense of a law creating a special public school district for handicapped children in that community, which was heard by the Supreme Court in 1994.

Lewin drafted a number of legislative provisions that preserve the constitutional right to freedom of religion including: the provision of the federal Civil Rights Act enacted in 1972 that protects religious observances of private employees, the provision of federal law that enables federal employees to observe religious holidays without financial penalty, the provision of New York's Domestic Relations Law that conditions the issuance of a civil divorce on removal of barriers to remarriage such as the delivery or acceptance of a get (Jewish religious divorce), the provision of federal law that entitles servicemen to wear yarmulkes with their military uniforms and advocated on behalf of Jewish prisoners who were denied kosher food.

==== Other Cases ====
Between 2002 and 2015, Lewin & Lewin litigated pro bono publico on behalf of Menachem Zivotofsky, who was born in Jerusalem and claimed the statutory right to have his U.S. passport designate his place of birth as "Israel." The case was argued twice in the Supreme Court of the United States (once by Lewin and once by Alyza Lewin) and three times in the U.S. Court of Appeals by Lewin (see Zivotofsky v. Clinton and Zivotofsky v. Kerry). After the Supreme Court held that the President had the exclusive constitutional authority to recognize a city as being within the borders of a foreign sovereign, U.S. President Donald Trump in December 2017 recognized Jerusalem as the capital of Israel. In October 2020, the State Department changed its passport policy and presented Menachem Zivotofsky with the first U.S. passport formally listing Israel as place of birth for a U.S. citizen born in Jerusalem.

Lewin conceded he submitted a picture of Baruch Herzfeld dancing with a non-Jewish woman to an Orthodox rabbinical court as part of his case against him, but insists it was "a minor detail of the case".

In 2014 and 2015, Lewin represented Binyamin Stimler, a member of the New York divorce coercion gang whose purpose was the kidnap and torture of Jewish men in order to force them into granting religious divorces to their wives. Stimler was sentenced to 39 months in prison for his role in the plot.

Lewin is currently representing Mike Lindell and My Pillow, defendants in a $1.3 billion lawsuit brought by U.S. Dominion, Inc. for libel in connection with Lindell's claims that Dominion "stole" the 2020 election from Donald Trump.

=== Academia ===
Lewin has also taught at many of the nation's top law schools. In the 1970s he was an Adjunct Professor of Constitutional Law at Georgetown Law School. In 1974-1975 he was visiting professor at the Harvard Law School, teaching Advanced Constitutional Law (First Amendment Litigation) and the first formal course ever given in a national law school on the subject of “Defense of White-Collar Crime.” He also taught a seminar on Appellate Advocacy. In 1994, Lewin gave a semester-long seminar on “Religious Minorities in Supreme Court Litigation” at the University of Chicago Law School and taught that seminar at Columbia Law School from 1996 to 2018. He also taught a course in Jewish Civil Law at George Washington University Law School for several years.

=== Non-profit work ===
Between 1982 and 1984, he served as President of the Jewish Community Council of Greater Washington, and for more than 30 years, he served as the national vice president of the National Jewish Commission on Law and Public Affairs (COLPA). Lewin was president of the American Section of the International Association of Jewish Lawyers and Jurists from 1992 to 1997. He is currently Honorary President of its successor, the American Association of Jewish Lawyers and Jurists.

=== Notable clients ===
Lewin's individual clients have included the Agudas Chasidei Chabad which was led by Lubavitcher Rebbe Menachem Mendel Schneerson, Attorney General Edwin Meese III, whom he represented while he was serving as Attorney General, former President Richard Nixon, Jodie Foster, John Lennon, nursing home owner Bernard Bergman, Congressman George Hansen, Teamsters president Roy Williams, and Israeli war hero Aviem Sella.

Lewin represented Sholom Rubashkin in the appeal from his conviction and sentencing to 27 years in jail. He also served as the Justice Department's special counsel in the deportation case against Valerian Trifa who had led the Iron Guard in Nazi-occupied Romania.

== Personal life ==
Lewin is married to Rikki Gordon (a photojournalist), with whom he has two daughters, Alyza Doba (an attorney who is also his law partner) and Na’ama Batya (a multimedia artist and photojournalism professor). Lewin has six grandchildren.

== Publications by Lewin ==
Lewin has written numerous articles on American jurisprudence, politics, and religion. He was an author and Contributing Editor to The New Republic between 1970 and 1991. His articles on law and the Supreme Court have appeared in The New York Times, The Los Angeles Times, Newsday, Saturday Review, The Washington Post, and other periodicals.

In an essay in Sh'ma, Lewin said that suicide bombers were ready to give up their lives to murder crowds of people to whom they were not related and did not know. For deterrence to be effective, the law should notify potential bombers that their adult family members will be treated as if they were in the crowd of victims. If they knew or should have known of the suicide bomber's plans and failed to dissuade the bomber, they would be treated in legal proceedings as criminals subject to the death penalty.

== See also ==
- List of law clerks for the ninth seat of the Supreme Court of the United States
