= Chaim Dovid Zwiebel =

Chaim Dovid Zwiebel is the Executive Vice President of Agudath Israel of America. He worked for a law firm for 4 and a half years before joining this organisation. He was selected for his current position in 1998, due to the death of his predecessor, Moshe Sherer.

== Early life ==
Zwiebel attended Brooklyn College and Cardozo Law School. He worked as a lawyer at Paul, Weiss, Rifkind, Wharton, & Garrison.

== Prior involvement ==
Zwiebel was part of the 1992 effort by "conservative Catholic and Jewish groups", to oppose "right-to-die" proponents who were advocating legislation to "allow family members to speak for patients who can no longer speak for themselves". At that time, he was serving Agudath Israel as general counsel and director of government affairs.

== As Executive Vice President ==
Zwiebel helped Agudath Israel to organise and operate, the August 2012 National Celebration of the 12th Siyum HaShas. The celebration was held in MetLife Stadium, and was the largest gathering of Orthodox Jewry in the history of the United States, with 90,000 people attending.

As part of an ongoing challenge, regarding religious freedom, Zwiebel, who was described by The New York Times as "leader of an ultra-Orthodox group", was successful in pushing for the repeal by NYC Mayor de Blasio,The Times had previously called it, “Mayor Bloomberg's attempt "to regulate Jewish circumcision"”.

== Personal life ==
His sister was educator and lecturer Rebbetzin Zahava Braunstein (principal of Beit Yaakov Ateret Torah High School), who was married to educator Rabbi Shlomo Braunstein (principal of Yeshiva Rabbi Chaim Berlin's high school).
