= Baruch Herzfeld =

American businessman

- Born: Staten Island, New York
- Education: Yeshiva University
- Occupation: Businessman
- Website: https://www.popwheels.club/ https://zenoradio.com https://zenolive.com

Baruch Herzfeld (born 1972) is an American inventor and social entrepreneur, known for founding Zeno Media, co-founding Popwheels, and for his bicycle activism in Brooklyn. He is the former owner of Traif Bike Geschaft.

== Career ==
=== Popwheels ===
Herzfeld is a founder of Popwheels, an e-bike battery charging start-up. The co-founder of Popwheels, David Hammer, has used his prior experience dealing with large corporations to advance collaborations with the New York City Department of Transportation and other entities. The NYCDOT awarded a pilot project to the company to reduce the risk of indoor fires from bike batteries. Herzfeld believes that there is an "ethical mandate" to take dangerous batteries out of residences where they can be a fire hazard. In 2025, the company built the first FDNY approved battery swapping cabinet.

=== Zeno Media ===
Herzfeld created a tool using conference call technology to broadcast online radio that connects immigrant communities in the United States to their homelands. Focused primarily on New York City feeder communities, this tool, he named ZenoRadio, recruited its first users who were new residents hailing from San Jose de las Matas, Dominican Republic; San Fernando, Trinidad and Tobago; and Governador Valadares, Minas Gerais, Brazil. Herzfeld set up alternative voice over IP routes in these immigrant hometowns to keep families affordably linked between their old and new lives. Today, the service is called Zeno.FM these connections extend to more than 25 countries, from China, Cambodia, Nigeria, and Congo, to Nicaragua, Haiti, Brazil, and the Dominican Republic. Herzfeld can say "Hello," "Goodbye" and "Thank you" in over forty languages.

=== Bicycle Activism ===
Herzfeld is the former owner of Traif Bike Geschaft, a bicycle repair shop in Williamsburg, Brooklyn. He lent 500 used bicycles he had purchased from Japan to the Satmar Hasidim free of charge in an attempt to alleviate neighborhood tension between the burgeoning hipster community and the long-time Hasidic Jewish community. Herzfeld purchased 40 used mobile home trailers to store the bikes resulting in what was Brooklyn's first and only trailer park. A trailer park full of bikes and no one to ride them then inspired his personal mission to supply the local Williamsburg, Brooklyn community of Hasidic Jews with wheels to ride around the neighborhood, emerging as a cultural disruptor. Herzfeld became known as a community disruptor by local media, and dubbed a macher by Jewish media. His crowdsourcing experiments also include: a bike vending machine, a bike share program, a landlord business using a psychic to vet tenants, and an ATM that rewarded the 10th user with an extra $20 bill. In 2024 New York City created a bike lane on Bedford Ave. that reduced bicycle injuries by 47% according to the NYCDOT. However, New York City Mayor Eric Adams reduced the lane to an unprotected bike lane after complaints from the Williamsburg Hasidim. Baruch Herzfeld and his son Rafe Herzfeld filed a law suit with the advocacy group Transportation Alternatives to restore the bike lanes' protected status. Baruch and Rafe Herzfeld have published opinions arguing that Orthodox Jews want bike lanes. Baruch and Rafe Herzfeld were named the "2025 Advocates of the year" for their important work to make changes to better the streets of New York City.

=== Hispaniola Disputes ===
In 2010, Herzfeld commuted to the Dominican Republic for SkyMax Dominicana, a telecom company based in Brooklyn, NY. The company's owner, Moses Greenfield, a Satmar Hasid, fired Herzfeld in 2007. Herzfeld and Greenfield disputed how much compensation the company owed Herzfeld, and they took their conflict to a beth din. Greenfield's attorney was Nathan Lewin. The beth din ruled that Herzfeld was entitled to some of the profits he demanded. Herzfeld has also advocated for returning the island of Navassa to Haiti.
