= James Van Horne =

American economist (1935–2025)

James Carter Van Horne (August 6, 1935 – September 1, 2025) was an American economist and finance academic. He was the A. P. Giannini Professor of Banking and Finance at the Stanford Graduate School of Business (GSB). He authored five books, more than 60 articles, and numerous case studies. His teaching and research covered corporate finance, mergers and acquisitions, corporate restructuring, money and capital markets, and fixed-income securities.

== Early life and education ==
Van Horne was born in South Bend, Indiana on August 6, 1935. He completed his bachelor's degree at DePauw University in 1957, followed by master's and doctoral degrees at Northwestern University in 1961 and 1964, respectively.

== Career ==
In 1965, Van Horne began teaching at Stanford Graduate School of Business. He was promoted to professor and became the school's first faculty director of the MBA program (1970–73). He twice served as associate dean of academic affairs during the 1970s and later headed the finance group, helping to build it into one of the leading academic finance groups worldwide.

He served as president of the Western Finance Association from 1981 to 1982, and was the 1984 president of the American Finance Association. He retired from Stanford in 2007 after 42 years on the faculty. He also served on federal and California state commissions and advisory groups, and sat on several corporate and nonprofit boards.

== Teaching and influence ==
Over the course of his career, Van Horne taught between 7,000 and 8,000 students. He was known as an “old school” professor: he addressed students formally, was famous for cold-calling, and pressed students to justify every detail of their decisions. His advanced course Topics in Corporate Finance was structured as a quasi-seminar with case discussions, focusing on capital structure, distribution policy, mergers and acquisitions, and corporate restructuring. His Corporate Finance course was described in obituaries as “legendary” for its rigor and case-based approach, and he was noted for his commitment to mentoring students.

== Research and commentary ==
Van Horne's research addressed the theory and behavior of interest rates, capital budgeting decisions, corporate finance, valuation, the term structure of interest rates, the effects of inflation, and financial innovation. He authored widely used textbooks, including Fundamentals of Financial Management and Financial Management and Policy. The latter, first published in 1968, was among the first textbooks to integrate modern finance with corporate decision-making, and it remained in global use for four decades. He has been described as “the father of modern corporate finance MBA teaching.” In public commentary during the Enron scandal, he warned against misleading accounting practices, calling Enron's collapse “the neutron bomb of accounting.” He criticized pro forma earnings, revenue recognition abuses, and use of special-purpose entities, and urged investors to focus on balance sheets and operating cash cycles.

== Death ==
Van Horne died in Palo Alto, California on September 1, 2025, at the age of 90. He was survived by his wife of 65 years, Mimi, their three sons, Drew, Stuart, and Steve, and several grandchildren.

== Awards and honors ==
In 1982, he received the school's inaugural MBA Distinguished Teaching Award, and in 1997, he became the first two-time recipient. He was the 1998 recipient of the Robert T. Davis Award for extraordinary faculty contributions. In 2011, the GSB established the James C. Van Horne Professorship in his honor; the named professorship was first held by Jeffrey Zwiebel. He was also elected a Fellow of the American Finance Association.

== Selected publications ==
- Van Horne, James (2000). Fundamentals of Financial Management (11th ed.). Prentice Hall. ISBN 013090533X.
- Van Horne, James (2001). Financial Management and Policy (12th ed.). Pearson. ISBN 0130326577.
- Van Horne, James (2001). Financial Market Rates and Flows (6th ed.). Prentice Hall. ISBN 0130326976.
