= Zeno Media =

Media company

- Type: Privately held company
- Industry: Content Streaming
- Founded: New York City, 2011
- Headquarters: Midtown, Manhattan, New York City
- Area served: Global
- Key people: Baruch Herzfeld
- Website: zeno.fm

Zeno Media is a media company that provides online audio streaming targeting diaspora communities. Its flagship product Zeno.FM features programming from 248 countries and an average monthly listenership of 40 million.

== Background ==
The company's former logo.

Founded in 2011, the company's stated mission is to "amplify local voices while connecting niche and diaspora communities to their hometown radio stations and native language programming." It features roughly 25,000 streams from large- and small-scale creators.

Broadcasters and listeners by and large hail from West Africa, Central Asia, and the Caribbean, and are now settled in the greater New York area. In 2015, Ghana, Nigeria, Haiti and the Dominican Republic were listed as Zeno Media's largest ethnic listener and broadcaster groups.

== Business structure ==
The company offers hosting for streaming and podcasts, with a free option and a paid subscription plan. Paid members are eligible to monetize their content.
