= Alfred Zwiebel =

German-American painter

Alfred Zwiebel (November 6, 1914 — February 25, 2005) was a German-American landscape, floral, and still-life painter.

== Early life ==
He was born in Fürth, in southern Germany, but when he was four, his family moved to the city of Bamberg, today a UNESCO World Heritage Site because of its medieval cathedral and many other gems of art and architecture from the Middle Ages, Renaissance, and Baroque. It was there that he spent his childhood and youth, and the beauty of that city and its surrounding area, the region of Germany known as "Franconian Switzerland," inspired him from his boyhood to the end of his life.

Soon after the Nazis came to power, Zwiebel and his family left Germany; he and his four siblings were raised as Lutherans by their mother, but his father was Jewish, as well as politically active against the Nazis. In 1935, Zwiebel immigrated to the United States, living first in Milwaukee and then settling in New York City, where in 1941 he married Clara Fried, a portrait painter who had studied with American Realist artist Tully Filmus. They had one child, a daughter. Zwiebel served in the U.S. Army during World War II and became an American citizen in 1944.

For the next 20 years he worked at a variety of "day jobs," painting whenever he had free time. Among other things, he worked as a baker, ski salesman, and commercial artist. From 1949-1953, he was a radio personality in New York City, where he had a weekly program, "Music From Alfred Zwiebel's Collection," on station WABF, playing opera and classical music recordings from his own extensive collection (opera was another of his lifelong passions). He also occasionally wrote articles on music for publication. Two singers engaged at the Metropolitan Opera in the 1950s and '60s, Lisa Della Casa and Anneliese Rothenberger, studied painting with him while in New York.

== Artistic Career and Exhibitions ==
By the 1960s, he was able to devote himself to painting full-time. In the ensuing decades, his work was shown in galleries and museums across the United States, and in England, Austria and his native Germany, where he achieved particular critical acclaim. (Excerpts from some reviews are included below.)

When in 1977 Countess and Count Lennart Bernadotte opened a public art gallery in their castle on Mainau Island, a popular tourist site on Lake Constance (Bodensee) because of its spectacular gardens, Zwiebel was invited to give the inaugural exhibition. He was also invited by the city of Bamberg to give an exhibition as part of the city's 1,000th-anniversary celebration in 1973 and to take part in the special exhibition marking the 975th anniversary of the Bamberg Cathedral in 1987. Two of his works are represented in the catalog of that exhibition, "Symbol-Object-Motif: The Bamberg Cathedral and its Representation in Painting, Graphics and Other Art Forms from the Middle Ages to the Present."

In 1993, the Bamberg Historical Museum (Historisches Museum Bamberg), which also owns two of his works, gave a major retrospective exhibition of his work. Other selected exhibitions include:

- 1963, The Parrish Art Museum, Southampton, New York: "Contemporary Flower Paintings"
- 1968, Galerie Schumacher, Munich, Germany: "ALFRED ZWIEBEL, New York"
- 1971, Art Association of Harrisburg, PA and Livingston Gallery, New York, NY: "The Five Media Show"
- 1980, Antiquariat Heinemann, Starnberg, Germany: "Exhibition of Paintings by Alfred Zwiebel, New York"
- 1992, Mary Anthony Fine Art Gallery, New Hope, Pennsylvania: "Exhibition of Internationally Known 20th-Century Impressionist ALFRED ZWIEBEL"

== Work ==
Zwiebel worked in oil, pastel, and oil pastel (also called oilstick). Some of his work was done using rather dark values, especially a number of landscapes painted largely in blue and purple tones. Generally, however, Zwiebel was known for the vibrancy of his palette, as evidenced, for example, in the following press review (entitled "Optimism Expressed in Color"):

Color is the most important element in this artist's paintings; forms are reduced to a minimum, though they remain recognizable. This manner of painting embodies a positive and optimistic outlook: The clouds above Lake Starnberg cannot completely hide the sun; plays of color give voice to the certitude that even the most stubborn periods of bad weather will eventually end. The Bamberg Cathedral, one of the painter's favorite subjects, conveys life and warmth even in a blizzard; a "landscape in the fog" doesn't disappear into the mist, but remains a landscape from which the fog will soon lift. In his flower paintings, the artist is less interested in painting flowers as such; rather, he transforms a bouquet into a fantasy of light and color.

== Style and influences ==
Zwiebel was artistically somewhat out of sync with many of the artists of his own and subsequent generations, as he felt alienated by, and rejected, much of 20th-century modernism, particularly Abstract Expressionism. He felt the deepest affinity for Impressionism. The individual artists by whom he was most strongly influenced were Claude Monet (like Monet, he was fascinated by water lilies and made a great number of paintings of them), Camille Pissarro, Vincent van Gogh, and, in his flower paintings, Odilon Redon. When asked to which stylistic movement he felt he most belonged, he replied, "An artist must be free to work in whatever style the moment calls for, but if anything, I would call myself a modern impressionist."

Although some of his paintings are more post-impressionistic or even expressionistic in style, most art critics who reviewed his work also called him an Impressionist:

"Zwiebel is an 'admitted romanticist' and adds he's quite proud of this fact. Many of his canvases have the lyrical beauty of the French Impressionists. Looking over the walls of the Zwiebel home, soft pastels shimmer about. Paintings of a Long Island pond, a cabbage patch in Scarsdale, have much of the beauty of the great landscapes of Monet and Pissarro."

"Zwiebel has a capacity of feeling as turbulent as van Gogh, as soft as Turner, and as impressionistic as Monet."

"Alfred Zwiebel uses the impressionistic technique with all its wealth of light, nuanced play of color, and open palette, and this breathes life into what he paints. ... One could call Zwiebel a belated Pissarro, but with the caveat that he is a Pissarro for contemporary eyes."

"Zwiebel, whose models have always been the great Impressionists, has intentionally remained apart from the 'Moderns'... He stayed with Impressionism. But he has achieved, as the paintings exhibited here prove, mastery in this style. His landscapes are imbued with life; his flower still lifes have an almost tropical opulence of colors and forms. To view these works gives one great pleasure."

"Zwiebel has often been called a 'modern impressionist.' His works, with all their nuances of light and richness of palate [sic], are predominantly impressionistic in style although they also have a uniquely individual expressionist character, wherein the inner essence of a subject is more important than its outward form."

== Later Years and Death ==
Zwiebel continued to paint until the end of his life, although in his later years he had to struggle with failing eyesight and loss of color perception due to cataracts, as well as with Alzheimer's disease. He died of pneumonia in New York City at the age of 90.
