= Zivotofsky v. Clinton =

- Supreme Court of the United States

Argued November 7, 2011 Decided March 26, 2012
- Full case name: Menachem Binyamin Zivotofsky, By His Parents and Guardians, Ari Z. and Naomi Siegman Zivotofsky v. Hillary Rodham Clinton, Secretary of State
- Docket no.: 10-699
- Citations: 566 U.S. 189 (more) 132 S. Ct. 1421; 182 L. Ed. 2d 423; 2012 U.S. LEXIS 2536; 80 U.S.L.W. 4260

Case history
- Prior: Motion to dismiss granted, 2004 WL 5835212 (D.D.C. 2004); remanded, 444 F.3d 614 (D.C. Cir. 2006); dismissed again, 511 F.Supp.2d 97 (D.D.C. 2007); affirmed, 571 F.3d 1227 (D.C. Cir. 2009); rehearing en banc denied, 610 F.3d 84 (D.C. Cir. 2010); certiorari granted, 563 U. S. ___ (2011)
- Subsequent: See Zivotofsky v. Kerry for details.

Holding
- A dispute about the name of a country of origin on a passport is not a political question, so it is resolvable by the US court system.

Court membership
- Chief Justice John Roberts Associate Justices Antonin Scalia · Anthony Kennedy; Clarence Thomas · Ruth Bader Ginsburg; Stephen Breyer · Samuel Alito; Sonia Sotomayor · Elena Kagan

Case opinions
- Majority: Roberts, joined by Scalia, Kennedy, Thomas, Ginsburg, Kagan
- Concurrence: Alito (in judgment)
- Concurrence: Sotomayor (in part), joined by Breyer (Part I)
- Dissent: Breyer

Laws applied
- Article I, Section 8

Zivotofsky v. Clinton, 566 U.S. 189 (2012), is a United States Supreme Court decision in which the Court held that a dispute about passport regulation was not a political question and thus resolvable by the US court system. Specifically, Zivotofsky's parents sought to have his passport read "Jerusalem, Israel", rather than "Jerusalem", as his place of birth. The State Department had rejected that request under a longstanding policy that took no stance on the legal status of Jerusalem. Zivotofsky's parents then sued, citing a Congressional law that ordered the Secretary of State to list people born in Jerusalem as born in Israel.

In Zivotofsky v. Clinton, the Supreme Court rejected the State Department's claim that issues of foreign policy were inherently political and thus not justiciable by the Courts. The State Department had argued that the case could not be resolved except by adjudicating the status of Jerusalem. The Court found that resolving the Zivotofskys' dispute did not require such analysis, because the constitutionality of the challenged law could be distinguished from the accuracy of the resulting passport listings.

On remand, the Court of Appeals held in July 2013 that the law was an unconstitutional infringement of the president's recognition powers, which would later be appealed back to the Supreme Court in Zivotofsky v. Kerry.

== Background ==
=== Passport policy changes ===
In early 2002, Congress passed a passport regulation as part of the Foreign Relations Authorization Act, the annual budget authorization bill for the State Department. The policy (entitled "Record of Place of Birth as Israel for Passport Purposes") stated that "[f]or purposes of the registration of birth, certification of nationality, or issuance of a passport of a United States citizen born in the city of Jerusalem, the Secretary shall, upon the request of the citizen or the citizen's legal guardian, record the place of birth as Israel." This Congress-passed policy directly contradicted the State Department's guidelines which ordered the naming of the city alone when a nation's borders were in dispute. This policy had been applied to citizens born in Jerusalem.

When the act was passed in 2002, Hillary Clinton was a member of the Senate. The act passed by unanimous consent. Clinton was later appointed Secretary of State and was sued in her official capacity over the State Department's refusal to issue a passport in compliance with the act.

When the bill was presented to the President, George W. Bush attached a signing statement to the bill, expressing his belief that the Jerusalem policy passed by Congress would "interfere with the President's constitutional authority to... determine the terms on which recognition is given to foreign states."

=== Zivotofsky's suit ===
Menachem Binyamin Zivotofsky was born in Jerusalem on October 17, 2002, after the enactment of the Congress-passed Jerusalem policy. After their request to the State Department for his passport place-of-birth to say "Israel" was denied, his parents filed suit. The United States District Court for the District of Columbia dismissed the case on the grounds that the case brought a nonjusticiable political question. On appeal, the United States Court of Appeals for the District of Columbia Circuit reversed, holding that the question in the lawsuit had changed to the validity of the Congressional policy, Section 214 of the 2002 Act.

On remand, the District Court again found the case barred as being a political question; the Court said that Zivotofsky's claim would "necessarily require the Court to decide the political status of Jerusalem." On this question, the D.C. Circuit Court affirmed, holding that taking any position "on the status of Jerusalem" was not appropriate for judicial review.

Zivotofsky's parents petitioned the Supreme Court for a writ of certiorari to hear the case. The writ was subsequently granted.

== Opinion of the Court ==
Chief Justice John G. Roberts wrote the majority opinion for the Court, reversing the D.C. Circuit, and holding that Zivotofsky's claim could be reviewed by the courts. "In this case," Roberts wrote, "determining the constitutionality of § 214(d) involves deciding whether the statute impermissibly intrudes upon Presidential powers under the Constitution." Judging the constitutionality of a law in this context would not "turn on standards that defy judicial application" because reviewing the "textual, structural, and historical evidence put forward by the parties" is "what courts do." For this reason, even though such a decision may touch on political areas, there would be no reason the courts couldn't work through the evidence for an answer. To begin that task, the Court remanded the case back to the lower courts to conduct this analysis.

=== Sotomayor's concurrence ===
Justice Sonia Sotomayor concurred in part in the Court's opinion and concurred in the judgment of the Court. She parted from the majority in the way she applied different factors to see whether the case was barred by the political question doctrine. Sotomayor argued that if "the parties' textual, structural, and historical evidence is inapposite or wholly unilluminating, rendering judicial decision no more than guesswork, a case relying on the ordinary kinds of arguments offered to courts might well still present justiciability concerns".

=== Alito's concurrence ===
Justice Samuel Alito wrote a concurring opinion, in which he agreed with the Court decision to reverse the D.C. Circuit Court of Appeals but provided different grounds for doing so. He wrote that the issue before the Court was only a "narrow question" and thus it did not force the Court to enter a political realm.

=== Breyer's dissent ===
Justice Stephen Breyer dissented from the decision of the Court, arguing that the case was barred by the political question doctrine. Breyer argued that there were four sets of prudential considerations which, taken together in their totality, led to that conclusion. First, the issue arises in the field of foreign affairs. Second, the court may have to evaluate U.S. foreign policy. Third, no strong interest or right is at stake. Fourth, the conflict between Congress and the Executive can be resolved through nonjudicial means.

== See also ==
- Zivotofsky v. Kerry, subsequent decision on the case
- List of United States Supreme Court cases, volume 566
