= Marvin Schick =

American journalist and professor (1934–2020)

Marvin Schick (July 3, 1934 – April 23, 2020) was an American political scientist and constitutional law professor at Hunter College and the New School for Social Research. He was also known for his work in Jewish education.

== Career ==
Schick was a professor at Hunter College and New School for Social Research, where he taught political-science and constitutional law. He was president of the Rabbi Jacob Joseph School, for over 30 years, and was an educational consultant for the Avi Chai Foundation and has been described as an expert on Jewish Day Schools.

Schick founded National Jewish Commission on Law and Public Affairs (COLPA) in 1965, and served as its first president. He served in the second mayoral administration of NYC Mayor John V. Lindsay (1969–1973) (about which he wrote in 2000 "the first time ... and probably the last time") as liaison to the Jewish community, spokesman and administrative assistant.

His writings appeared in The Jewish Press and The Jewish Week.

== Personal ==
He was born the day before his twin brother Allen (by 15 minutes) on July 3, 1934, and died on April 23, 2020.

His father died before his 4th birthday. His mother, Rebbetzin Renee Schick, founded the Schick's Bakery in Boro Park in 1941, to help support her family.

== See also ==
- Learned Hand
