= Jeffrey Zwiebel =

American economist

- Born: December 12, 1965 (age 60)

Academic background
- Education: Princeton University (AB with highest honors, 1987); Massachusetts Institute of Technology (PhD, 1991)
- Doctoral advisor: Oliver Hart

Academic work
- Discipline: Microeconomics, corporate finance, sports economics
- Institutions: Stanford Graduate School of Business
- Awards: Sloan Research Fellowship

Jeffrey Herman Zwiebel (born December 12, 1965) is an American economist and the James C. Van Horne Professor of Finance at the Stanford Graduate School of Business.

A study he co-authored in 2013, along with Brett Green of the University of California, Berkeley, reported that the "hot-hand fallacy" did not appear to be a fallacy after all. Specifically, they reported that an average-power batter in Major League Baseball on a "hot streak" was about as likely to hit a home run as a good-power batter would normally be.
