= Orthodox Union =

Orthodox Jewish organization in the US

- תורה ומצוות
- Logo used since 2008
- Abbreviation: OU
- Formation: 1898; 128 years ago
- Founder: Henry Pereira Mendes
- Headquarters: New York City, US
- Coordinates: 40°42′19″N 74°00′51″W
- President: Mitchel R. Aeder
- Chairman: Yehuda Neuberger
- Executive Vice President/COO: Rabbi Josh Joseph
- Affiliations: Orthodox Judaism
- Website: www.ou.org
- Formerly called: Union of Orthodox Jewish Congregations of America

The Orthodox Union (OU) (Note: The Orthodox Union has been known by several names, sometimes simultaneously. It was initially called the Union of Orthodox Jewish Congregations of America but was often mistakenly referred to as the Union of Orthodox Hebrew Congregations of America. The formal title was typically shortened to "Orthodox Union" or "OU". As the OU's scope expanded, synagogue services became an increasingly smaller part of its focus, and the formal name no longer made sense. The name was officially changed to '"Orthodox Union" in the early 21st century.) is one of the largest Orthodox Jewish organizations in the United States. Founded on June 8, 1898, the OU supports a network of synagogues, youth programs, Jewish and Religious Zionist advocacy programs, programs for disabled people, localized religious study programs, and international units with locations in Israel and formerly in Ukraine. The OU maintains a kosher certification service, whose circled-U hechsher symbol, U+24CA Ⓤ CIRCLED LATIN CAPITAL LETTER U, is found on the labels of many kosher commercial and consumer food products.

Its synagogues and their rabbis typically identify themselves with Modern Orthodox Judaism.

== History ==
=== Foundation ===
The Union of Orthodox Jewish Congregations of America was founded as a lay synagogue federation in 1898 by Rabbi Henry Pereira Mendes. Its founding members were predominately modern, Western-educated Orthodox rabbis and lay leaders, of whom several were affiliated with the Jewish Theological Seminary (JTS), which originated as an Orthodox institution to combat the hegemony of the Reform movement.

Cracks between the OU and JTS first formed in 1913, when Solomon Schechter decided all alums of the institution would be allowed to apply for managerial positions in the newly created United Synagogue of America (then a non-denominational communal organization), though his close ally Rabbi Frederick de Sola Mendes advocated that only strictly pious ones should be so approved. Only then did Mendes begin to distinguish between "Conservative" and "Modern Orthodox" Judaism in his diary, though he could not articulate the difference. The OU, JTS, and RIETS were closely connected, with an alumnus of the latter two serving in the former's communities until the postwar era. Only around 1950 did Conservative and Modern Orthodox Judaism fully coalesce as opposing movements.

=== Development ===
During the early decades of its existence, the Orthodox Union was closely associated with and supported the development of Yeshiva University into a significant Jewish educational institution producing English-speaking, university-trained American rabbis for the pulpits of OU synagogues. Some Orthodox rabbis viewed the nascent OU and the rabbis of its synagogues as too "modern" in outlook. Thus, they did not participate; instead, they set up more stringent rabbinical organizations.

Nevertheless, the idea for a national Orthodox congregational body took hold. The OU was soon acknowledged within the American Jewish establishment as the main, but not exclusive, mouthpiece for the American Orthodox community. Representatives of 150 Orthodox congregations, with an estimated membership of 50,000, participated in the OU's 1919 national convention. The OU became more active in broader American Jewish policy issues after 1924, when Rabbi Herbert S. Goldstein, the innovative spiritual leader of the West Side Institutional Synagogue of Manhattan, became the president of the OU. Under Goldstein, the OU and its Rabbinical Council, became a founding member of the Synagogue Council of America, along with representatives of the Reform and Conservative movements and their rabbinic affiliates.

The OU played an active role in advocating for public policies important to Orthodox practice, such as advocating for the five-day workweek and defending the right to kosher slaughter. It was also involved in efforts to serve the religious needs of American Jewish soldiers and relief for European Jewry. The organization's secretary in its early years was Albert Lucas, a lawyer who was one of the first Orthodox Jewish activists. He led many efforts to protect Jewish rights, combat assimilation and missionary targeting, and to promote the resurgence of Orthodox Judaism in America.

==== Kashrut ====
In the 1920s, the OU started its kashrut division, establishing the concept of community-sponsored, not-for-profit kashrut supervision. In 1923, the H. J. Heinz Company's vegetarian beans became the first product to be kosher certified by the OU. Company executives at Heinz were afraid of alienating non-Jewish customers. Because of this, after much negotiation, the Orthodox Union agreed to drop the word "kosher" from their initial design in favor of the less Jewish-sounding "OU" symbol. The OU's kashrut program was heavily influenced by Abraham Goldstein, a chemist who used his knowledge of food science to determine the kosher status of various products. In 1935, Goldstein left the OU and started Organized Kashruth Laboratories (OK). The wide acceptance of OU kashrut supervision rested largely upon the outstanding reputation of its rabbinic administrator, Rabbi Alexander S. Rosenberg. He and his staff established effective kashrut supervision standards for modern food production technology, which allowed the availability of OU-certified packaged kosher products across the US since the 1950s.

By the mid-1930s, the OU kashrut division had matured enough to influence and challenge the traditional local rabbinic "sole practitioner" kashrut supervision model. At the time, kashrut was a profitable business for rabbis; the OU sought to make kashrut freely available to reduce the consumer cost of keeping kosher.

==== Mid-century ====
The OU Women's Branch was also organized during the 1920s to encourage the formation and support of active sisterhoods in OU synagogues. Women's Branch took on particular products, typically related to women's Jewish education and support for Yeshiva University.

OU operations became more efficient with the appointment in 1939 of Leo S. Hilsenrad as its first full-time professional executive director. Its services were further expanded in 1946, adding Saul Bernstein to the professional staff. Bernstein became the founding editor, in 1951, of Jewish Life, the OU's popular publication for Orthodox laymen. Bernstein also succeeded Hilsenrad as the OU's administrator.

During the postwar years, there was considerable overlap in the lay leadership of the Orthodox Union and Yeshiva University. The Orthodox Union expanded its operations following the election in 1954 of Moses I. Feuerstein as its president. Its leadership ranks were augmented by a talented group of lay leaders, including Joseph Karasick, Harold M. Jacobs, and Julius Berman, who would guide the OU's growth over the next several decades.

Another significant development was the appointment, in 1959, of Rabbi Pinchas Stolper as director of the Orthodox Union's youth group, the National Conference of Synagogue Youth (NCSY). By inspiring thousands of public-school educated high school youth across North America to become more observant, NCSY played a major role in launching the baal teshuva movement, a widespread spiritual re-awakening among Jewish youth which followed the 1967 Six-Day War.

OU's board of directors has had female members since the mid-1970s.

By the mid- to late-20th century, most synagogues affiliated with the Orthodox Union were under the leadership of rabbis trained by Rabbi Joseph Soloveitchik at Yeshiva University's Rabbi Isaac Elchanan Theological Seminary. These rabbis were ideologically Modern Orthodox. By the 1990s and early 21st century, the OU's general philosophy and observance levels have shifted towards stricter interpretations and halachic practices. This change has not necessarily affected individual member congregations but has impacted many Orthodox Jewish communities across America. The general trend toward more rigid practices among Orthodox Union congregations reflects American Orthodoxy's trend toward Haredi Judaism.

==== 21st century ====
In 2009, Rabbi Steven Weil succeeded Rabbi Tzvi Hersh Weinreb as the OU's Executive Vice President and was succeeded by Allen Fagin in April 2014. In 2011, Rabbi Simcha Katz became president, and was succeeded by Moishe Bane in January 2017. In 2014, the first women were elected as national officers of the OU; three female national vice presidents and two female associate vice presidents were elected.

In 2017, the OU adopted as formal policy the normative Orthodox position that the clergy is only for men. It precludes women from holding titles such as "rabbi" or from functioning as clergy in its congregations in the United States.

In June 2018, Attorney General Jeff Sessions spoke at the OU Advocacy Center's annual conference in Washington, where he was presented with an artistic rendering of the biblical command "Justice, justice shalt thou pursue." Given Sessions' policies, particularly those concerning immigrants and asylum seekers, the OU came under criticism for hosting him and presenting him with the plaque.

In 2020, Rabbi Moshe Hauer became the Executive Vice President along with Rabbi Josh Joseph as EVP/COO. Hauer was responsible for policy and was the organization's primary spokesman. Rabbi Joseph is responsible for the organization's programs and operations aside from the Kashrut division, the CEO of which is Rabbi Menachem Genack. The president is Mitchel Aeder.

=== Presidents ===
- Rabbi Henry Pereira Mendes (founding president)
- Rabbi Bernard Drachman
- Rabbi Herbert S. Goldstein
- Julius J. Dukas
- Charles H. Shapiro
- Dr. Samuel Nirenstein
- William B. Herlands
- Moses I. Feuerstein
- Rabbi Joseph Karasick
- Harold M. Jacobs (1973–1978)
- Julius Berman (1978–1984)
- Professor Sidney Kwestel (1984–1990)
- Sheldon Rudoff
- Dr. Mandell I. Ganchrow
- Harvey Blitz
- Stephen J. Savitsky
- Dr. Simcha Katz
- Martin Nachimson
- Moishe Bane
- Mitchel R. Aeder

== Activities ==
=== Alliance with the Rabbinical Council of America ===
For many years, the OU, along with its related rabbinic arm, the Rabbinical Council of America, worked with the larger Jewish community in the Synagogue Council of America. In this group, Orthodox, Conservative and Reform groups worked together on many issues of joint concern. The group became defunct in 1994, mainly over the objections of the Orthodox groups to Reform Judaism's official acceptance of patrilineal descent as an option for defining Jewishness.

=== Kosher certification ===
Hechsher of the Orthodox Union
- Expansion: Orthodox Union
- Certifying agency: Kosher Division of Orthodox Union
- Product category: Food products
- Type of standard: Religious

The Orthodox Union's Kosher Division, headed by CEO Menachem Genack, is the world's largest kosher certification agency. As of 2023, it supervises over 1,200,000 products in 13,000 plants in 105 countries. Two hundred thousand of those products are found in the US. It employs 886 rabbinic field representatives, mashgichim in Hebrew, and about 70 rabbinic coordinators who serve as account executives for OU-certified companies; they are supplemented by a roster of ingredient specialists, flavor analysts, and other support staff. The supervision process involves sending a mashgiach to the production facility to ensure that the product complies with Jewish law. The mashgiach supervises both the ingredients and the production process.

=== National Conference of Synagogue Youth ===
The international youth movement of the OU, the National Conference of Synagogue Youth (NCSY), was founded in the early 1950s. After a few false starts, NCSY succeeded under Rabbi Pinchas Stolper by reaching out to public school-educated Jewish youth with a message of Orthodox Jewish religious inspiration. It has now expanded its reach to include many already religious, mostly Modern Orthodox children attending Jewish day schools.

=== Orthodox Union Advocacy Center ===
The OU Advocacy Center is the non-partisan public policy arm of the OU, leading the organization's advocacy efforts in Washington, D.C., and state capitals. Formerly known as the Institute for Public Affairs, OU Advocacy engages leaders at all levels of government and the broader public to promote and protect the Orthodox Jewish community's interests and values in the public policy arena.

=== Synagogue affiliation ===
The OU requires that all member synagogues follow Orthodox Jewish interpretations of Jewish law and tradition. Men and women are seated separately and nearly always are separated by a mechitza, a physical divider between the men's and women's sections of the synagogue. Many OU synagogues support the concepts of Religious Zionism, which teaches that the existence of the State of Israel is a step towards the arrival of the Messiah and the eventual return of all Jews around the world to live in the ancient national Jewish homeland. The laws of Shabbat and kashrut are stressed. They pray in Hebrew, using the same traditional text of the siddur that has been used in Ashkenazi and Sephardi Jewish communities for the last few centuries.

Until the 1980s, the most popular English translation of the prayer book used in OU synagogues had been Ha-Siddur Ha-Shalem edited by Philip Birnbaum. In recent years, the most popular translated siddurim have been the Rabbinical Council of America edition of the Artscroll siddur and the Koren Siddur. Similarly, the most common Hebrew-English Chumash used had been the Pentateuch and Haftarahs, edited by Rabbi Joseph H. Hertz; in recent years this has been supplanted by The Chumash: The Stone Edition, also known as the Artscroll Chumash.

=== Yachad ===
Yachad: The National Jewish Council for Disabilities is a global organization dedicated to addressing the needs of Jews with disabilities and ensuring their inclusion in every aspect of Jewish life. The inclusive design aims to ensure that persons with diverse abilities have their rightful place within the Jewish community while it helps to educate and advocate in the Jewish world for greater understanding, acceptance, outreach, and a positive attitude toward disabled persons.

== Controversy ==
=== Baruch Lanner abuse scandal ===
The OU has been accused of ignoring multiple reports of child abuse when appointing Rabbi Baruch Lanner as Director of Regions of its National Conference of Synagogue Youth movement. Lanner was ultimately convicted of multiple counts of sexual abuse and imprisoned. In response to the scandal, the OU implemented several new initiatives to better protect children under their care.

=== Shechita supervision ===
In 2005, an undercover video purportedly showed cruel treatment of animals in an OU-certified slaughterhouse. The story was featured many times in national newspapers and Jewish media. The OU defended its limited supervision scope while studying changes to its policy. In 2006, the OU's response was the subject of a video narrated by Jonathan Safran Foer, Irving Greenberg, and David Wolpe.

=== Agriprocessor, Inc. ===
In May 2008, the U.S. Immigration and Customs Enforcement, together with other Federal agencies, raided a kosher slaughterhouse and meat packing plant in Postville, Iowa, owned by Agriprocessors, Inc. At the time, the OU provided kosher certification services to the plant. The raid was the largest single raid of a workplace in U.S. history. It resulted in nearly 400 arrests of immigrant workers with false identity papers, many of whom were charged with identity theft, document fraud, use of stolen social security numbers, and related offenses. Some 300 workers were convicted on document fraud charges within four days. The majority served a five-month prison sentence before being deported. The OU had numerous rabbis working on-premises, yet none reported child workers working illegally at the plant or the abusive conditions workers faced on-site.

== See also ==
- Rabbinical Council of America
- COR
