= Moshe Sherer =

Rabbi Moshe Sherer
- Born: June 18, 1921; Brooklyn, New York, U.S.
- Died: May 17, 1998 (aged 76)
- Education: Yeshiva Torah Vodaas; Yeshivas Ner Yisroel
- Occupations: Rabbi; Advocate
- Years active: 1941–1998
- Known for: Advocacy for Orthodox Jewry, Establishing the Orthodox Jewish government affairs office in Washington, D.C.
- Title: Co-Chairman of the Agudath Israel World Organization, Chairman of Agudath Israel of America

Rabbi Moshe Sherer (June 18, 1921 – May 17, 1998) was co-Chairman of the Agudath Israel World Organization from 1980, and the Chairman of Agudath Israel of America from the 1960s, until his death in 1998.

== Early life ==
Sherer was born in Brooklyn on June 8, 1921. His early education was at Yeshiva Torah Vodaas, followed by studying at Baltimore, Maryland-based Yeshivas Ner Yisroel where his mentor was Rabbi Aharon Kotler.

== Career ==
Sherer "joined Agudath Israel as its executive vice president in 1941, when it was a small group with few employees," and added the title of president in 1963. He oversaw the tilt whereby "Within Orthodoxy, there's a sense of being pulled to the right."

=== Advocacy ===
He was an active presence in the United States capitol for better than half-a-century, advocating the interests and articulating the views of Orthodox Jewry. In 1988 he created a full-time Orthodox Jewish government affairs office in Washington, D.C. His role has been described as shtadlan (government intercessor); he testified before Congress and often led groups of intercessors to Washington, to meet with elected officials.

Throughout his career rabbi Sherer strongly supported the State of Israel and advocated on its behalf. In 1975, after the infamous “Zionism is Racism” United Nations resolution, Sherer, then-president of Agudath Israel of America, wrote that “Though the resolution was supposedly aimed only at secular ‘Zionism’… the slander is an attack on the entire Jewish people.” Even if the hatred was aimed only at certain Jews, he continued, “we (Agudath Israel adherents) would feel precisely the same responsibility to come to the defense of our brethren. While we may have our own quarrel with secular Zionism, when Jews are libeled, their affiliation does not matter; our love for our brothers and sisters draws us to their side.” But what is more, he stressed, “the U. N. resolution is aimed at all Jews, for it assails the historical Jewish right to Eretz Yisrael. The Torah bestowed that right, and any attack on it is an attack on Judaism and the Jewish people.”

In 1997 he also coordinated advertising both in Israel and within the United States "to explain what Orthodox Judaism was about" and strengthen "Orthodoxy's increasingly influential right wing." That same year Sherer renewed advocacy regarding "Who is a Jew" (Mee Hu Yehudi) and retaining a "One People, One Conversion" standard.

== Biography ==
Matzav.com headlined "10 years in the making" for the 2009-published biography titled Rabbi Sherer: The Paramount Torah Spokesman of Our Era by Yonoson Rosenblum. The review by Yeshiva World includes Sherer saying that his 1938 encounter with Elchonon Wasserman was "a turning point in my life."

== Personal life and death ==
His brother Harry was a prominent Reform rabbi who converted Sammy Davis Jr. to Judaism. Their mother's name was Basya.

Sherer died of leukemia on Sunday afternoon, May 17, 1998. He was survived by his wife, two married daughters, son Rabbi Shimshon Sherer, Daughter Elky Goldschmidt as well as grandchildren and great-grandchildren.

Among those public officials who eulogized Sherer were:

- Governor George Pataki
- Mayor Rudy Giuliani
- Senator Daniel Patrick Moynihan

At Agudah's dinner that evening, Vice-President Al Gore said, just hours after his death: "Many in the Orthodox community say, 'How far we have come.' They should say, 'How far he brought us!'"
