= Prayer =

Invocation or act that seeks to activate a rapport with a deity

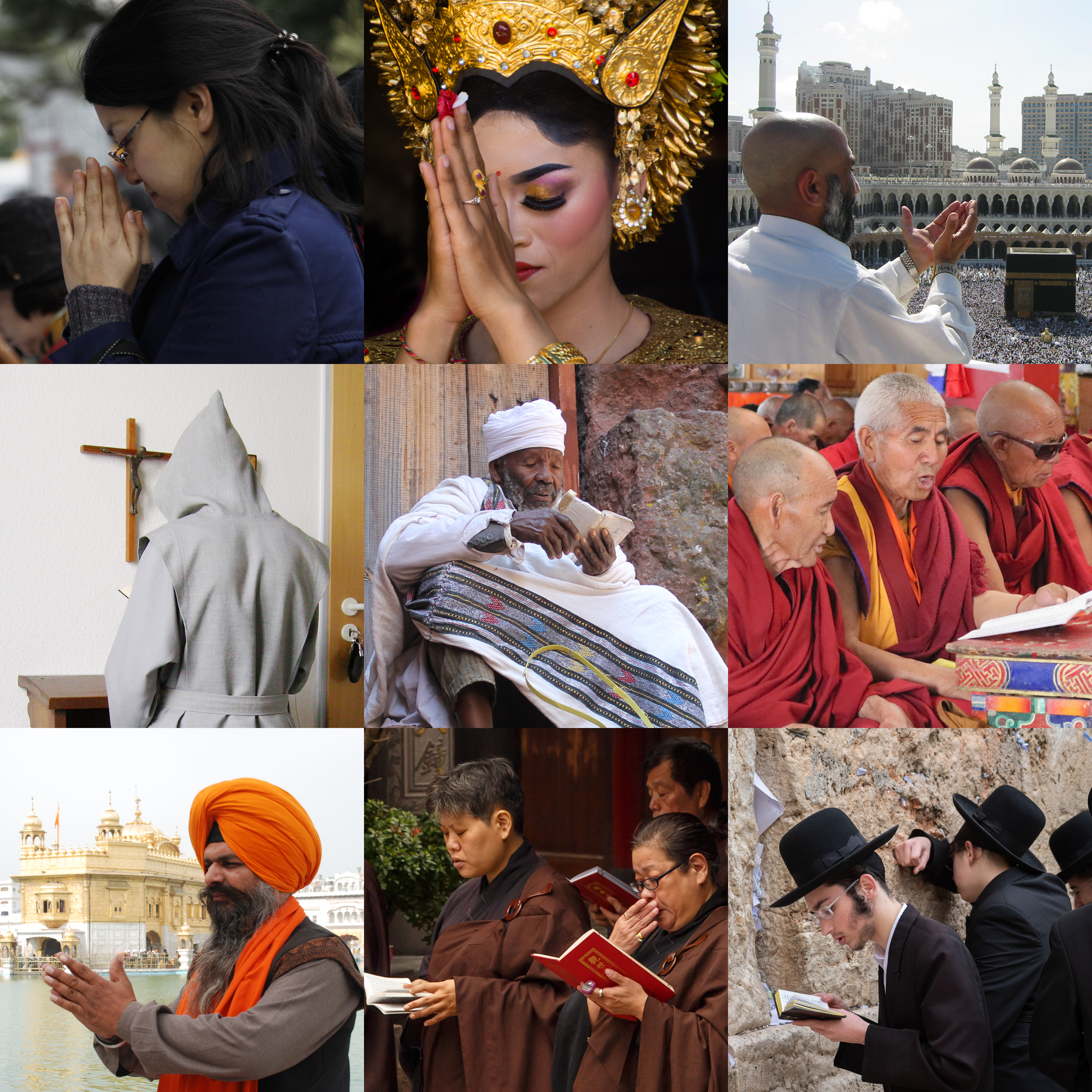
Collage of various religionists praying.: Top: Shinto festivalgoer praying in front of the Tagata fertility shrine, Balinese Hindu bride praying during a traditional wedding ceremony, Muslim pilgrim praying at the Masjid al-Haram; Middle: Catholic Trappist monk praying before a crucifix, Ethiopian priest praying in Lalibela, Buddhists praying in Leh; Bottom: Sikh praying in Front of the Golden Temple in Amritsar, Traditional Chinese prayer service, Jewish people praying at the Western Wall

Share of people who pray frequently, 2022

Prayer is an invocation or act that seeks to activate a rapport with an object of worship through deliberate communication. In the narrow sense, the term refers to an act of supplication or intercession directed towards a deity or a deified ancestor. More generally, prayer can also have the purpose of giving thanks or praise, and in comparative religion is closely associated with more abstract forms of meditation and with charms or spells.

Prayer can take a variety of forms: it can be part of a set liturgy or ritual, and it can be performed alone or in groups. Prayer may take the form of a hymn, incantation, formal creedal statement, or a spontaneous utterance in the praying person.

The act of prayer is attested in written sources as early as five thousand years ago. Today, most major religions involve prayer in one way or another; some ritualize the act, requiring a strict sequence of actions or placing a restriction on who is permitted to pray, while others teach that prayer may be practiced spontaneously by anyone at any time.

Scientific studies regarding the use of prayer have mostly concentrated on its effect on the healing of sick or injured people. The efficacy of prayer in faith healing has been evaluated in numerous studies, with contradictory results. Many well-controlled trials have found no effect; some even suggest negative outcomes.

== Etymology ==
The English term prayer is from Medieval Latin: precaria, lit. 'petition, prayer'. The Vulgate Latin is oratio, which translates Greek προσευχή in turn the Septuagint translation of Biblical Hebrew תְּפִלָּה tĕphillah.

== Act of prayer ==
Various spiritual traditions offer a wide variety of devotional acts. There are morning and evening prayers, grace said over meals, and reverent physical gestures. Some Christians bow their heads and fold their hands. Some Native Americans regard dancing as a form of prayer. Hindus chant mantras. Jewish prayer may involve swaying back and forth and bowing. Muslim prayer involves bowing, kneeling, and prostration, while some Sufis whirl.

Within Christian circles, Friedrich Heiler is frequently referenced for his Typology of Prayer, which systematically lists six types of prayer: primitive, ritual, Greek cultural, philosophical, mystical, and prophetic. Some forms of prayer require a prior ritualistic form of cleansing or purification, such as ghusl and wudhu.

Prayer may occur privately and individually (sometimes called affective prayer), or collectively, shared by or led on behalf of fellow-believers of either a specific faith tradition or a broader grouping of people. Prayer can be incorporated into a daily "thought life", in which one is in constant communication with a god. Some people pray throughout all that is happening during the day and seek guidance as the day progresses. This practice is regarded as a requirement in several Christian denominations. There can be many different answers to prayer, just as there are many ways to interpret an answer to a question, if there in fact comes an answer.

Some traditions distinguish between contemplative and meditative prayer. Contemplation is a foundational type of prayer in the Catholic faith, but it's distinct from other forms of prayer, like meditation. Meditation is the use of the understanding, the reasoning faculty to come to know God's revelation better. Contemplation is the use of the imagination to achieve the same end.

Outward acts that may accompany prayer include anointing with oil; ringing a bell; burning incense or paper; lighting a candle or candles; facing a specific direction (e.g., towards Mecca or the East); and making the sign of the cross. One less noticeable act related to prayer is fasting.

A variety of body postures may be assumed, often with specific meaning (mainly respect or adoration) associated with prayer: standing; sitting; kneeling; prostrate on the floor; eyes opened; eyes closed; hands folded or clasped; hands upraised; holding hands with others; a laying on of hands and others. Prayers may be recited from memory, read from a book of prayers, or composed spontaneously or "impromptu". They may be said, chanted, or sung. They may or may not have a musical accompaniment. There may be a time of outward silence while prayers are offered mentally. Often, there are prayers to fit specific occasions, such as the blessing of a meal, the birth or death of a loved one, other significant events in the life of a believer, or days of the year that have special religious significance. Details corresponding to specific traditions are outlined below.

== Origins and early history ==
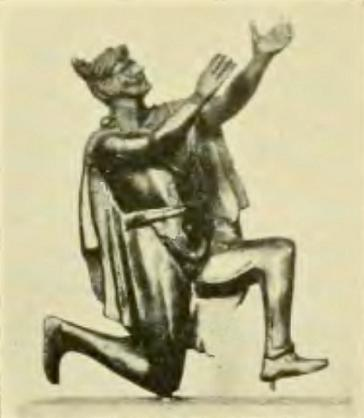
A kneeling position with raised hands expressed "supplication" in classical antiquity. The word for "prayer" and for "supplication" is identical in ancient languages (oratio, προσευχή, תְּפִלָּה etc.), with no terminological distinction between supplications addressed to human as opposed to divine powers. Statuette known as "Praying German" or "supplicating barbarian". It is not known if this figure was originally set in a context of religious prayer or of military surrender.

Anthropologically, the concept of prayer is closely related to that of surrender and supplication. The traditional posture of prayer in medieval Europe is kneeling or supine with clasped hands, in antiquity more typically with raised hands. The early Christian prayer posture was standing, looking up to heaven, with outspread arms and bare head. This is the pre-Christian, pagan prayer posture (except for the bare head, which was prescribed for males in I Corinthians 11:4; in Roman paganism, the head had to be covered in prayer). Certain Cretan and Cypriote figures of the Late Bronze Age, with arms raised, have been interpreted as worshippers. Their posture is similar to the "flight" posture, a crouching posture with raised hands related to the universal "hands up" gesture of surrender. The kneeling posture with clasped hands appears to have been introduced only with the beginning high medieval period, presumably adopted from a gesture of feudal homage.

Although prayer in its literal sense is not used in animism, communication with the spirit world is vital to the animist way of life. This is usually accomplished through a shaman who, through a trance, gains access to the spirit world and then shows the spirits' thoughts to the people. Other ways to receive messages from the spirits include using astrology or contemplating fortune tellers and healers.

Some of the oldest extant literature, such as the Kesh temple hymn (c. 26th century BC), is liturgy addressed to deities and thus technically "prayer". The Egyptian Pyramid Texts of about the same period similarly contain spells or incantations addressed to the gods. In the loosest sense, in the form of magical thinking combined with animism, prayer has been argued as representing a human cultural universal, which would have been present since the emergence of behavioral modernity, by anthropologists such as Sir Edward Burnett Tylor and Sir James George Frazer.

Reliable records are available for the polytheistic religions of the Iron Age, most notably Ancient Greek religion, which strongly influenced Roman religion. These religious traditions were direct developments of the earlier Bronze Age religions. Ceremonial prayer was highly formulaic and ritualized.

In ancient polytheism, ancestor worship is indistinguishable from theistic worship (see also euhemerism). Vestiges of ancestor worship persist, to a greater or lesser extent, in modern religious traditions throughout the world, most notably in Japanese Shinto, Vietnamese folk religion, and Chinese folk religion. The practices involved in Shinto prayer are heavily influenced by Buddhism; Japanese Buddhism has also been strongly influenced by Shinto in turn. Shinto prayers quite frequently consist of wishes or favors asked of the kami, rather than lengthy praises or devotions. The practice of votive offering is universal and is attested at least since the Bronze Age. In Shinto, this takes the form of a small wooden tablet, called an ema.

Prayers in Etruscan were used in the Roman world by augurs and other oracles long after Etruscan became a dead language. The Carmen Arvale and the Carmen Saliare are two specimens of partially preserved prayers that seem to have been unintelligible to their scribes and whose language is full of archaisms and difficult passages.

Roman prayers and sacrifices were envisioned as legal bargains between deity and worshipper. The Roman principle was expressed as do ut des: "I give, so that you may give." Cato the Elder's treatise on agriculture contains many examples of preserved traditional prayers; in one, a farmer addresses the unknown deity of a possibly sacred grove, and sacrifices a pig in order to placate the god or goddess of the place and beseech his or her permission to cut down some trees from the grove.

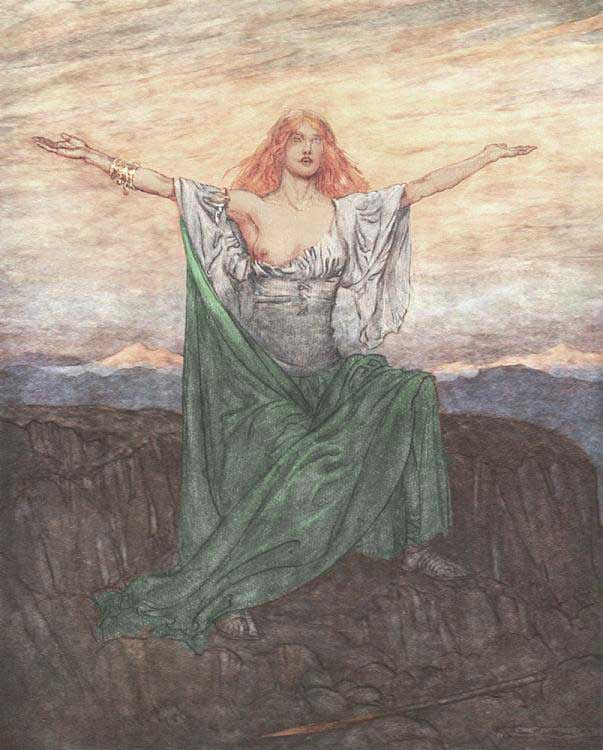
The valkyrie Sigrdrífa says a pagan Norse prayer in Sigrdrífumál; illustration by Arthur Rackham

Celtic, Germanic and Slavic religions are recorded much later, and much more fragmentarily, than the religions of classical antiquity. Nevertheless, they show substantial parallels to the better-attested religions of the Iron Age. In the case of Germanic religion, the practice of prayer is reliably attested, but no actual liturgy is recorded from the early (Roman era) period. An Old Norse prayer is on record in the form of a dramatization in skaldic poetry. This prayer is recorded in stanzas 2 and 3 of the poem Sigrdrífumál, compiled in the 13th century Poetic Edda from earlier traditional sources, where the valkyrie Sigrdrífa prays to the gods and the earth after being woken by the hero Sigurd. A prayer to Odin is mentioned in chapter 2 of the Völsunga saga where King Rerir prays for a child. In stanza 9 of the poem Oddrúnargrátr, a prayer is made to "kind wights, Frigg and Freyja, and many gods, In chapter 21 of Jómsvíkinga saga, wishing to turn the tide of the Battle of Hjörungavágr, Haakon Sigurdsson eventually finds his prayers answered by the goddesses Þorgerðr Hölgabrúðr and Irpa. Folk religion in the medieval period produced syncretisms between pre-Christian and Christian traditions. An example is the 11th-century Anglo-Saxon charm Æcerbot for the fertility of crops and land, or the medical Wið færstice. The 8th-century Wessobrunn Prayer has been proposed as a Christianized pagan prayer and compared to the pagan Völuspá and the Merseburg Incantations, the latter recorded in the 9th or 10th century but of much older traditional origins.

=== Aboriginal Australians ===
In traditional Australian Aboriginal religion and mythology, cultural values such as connection to country and knowledge of totemic ancestral beings have been essential to human occupation and survival on the continent for over 65,000 years. This knowledge and empowerment is passed down through story-telling, art, performance, and initiation by tribal elders (the most adept of these healers or sorcerers are known respectively as clevermen (and clever women), or kurdaitcha.) Sacred objects believed to give them their powers include tjurunga and maban.). In contemporary Australia, Indigenous connection to country is linked to increasing recognition, respect and protection for sacred sites, repatriation of Indigenous remains held in overseas museums for reburial on country, and finds expression through rituals such as welcome to country and smoking ceremonies often held at the beginning of civic and other public events.

=== North America ===
The Pueblo Indians of North America are known to have used prayer sticks, that is, sticks with feathers attached as supplicatory offerings. The Hopi Indians used prayer sticks as well, but they attached to it a small bag of sacred meal.

== Approaches to prayer ==
=== Direct petitions ===
There are different forms of prayer. One of them is to directly appeal to a deity to grant one's requests. Some have termed this as the social approach to prayer.

Atheist arguments against prayer are mostly directed against petitionary prayer in particular. Daniel Dennett argued that petitionary prayer might have the undesirable psychological effect of relieving a person of the need to take active measures.

This potential drawback manifests in extreme forms in such cases as Christian Scientists who rely on prayers instead of seeking medical treatment for family members for easily curable conditions which later result in death.

Christopher Hitchens (2012) argued that praying to a god which is omnipotent and all-knowing would be presumptuous. For example, he interprets Ambrose Bierce's definition of prayer by stating that "the man who prays is the one who thinks that god has arranged matters all wrong, but who also thinks that he can instruct god how to put them right."

=== Educational approach ===
In this view, prayer is not a conversation. Rather, it is meant to inculcate certain attitudes in the one who prays, but not to influence. Among Jews, this has been the approach of Rabbenu Bachya, Rabbi Yehuda Halevi, Joseph Albo, Samson Raphael Hirsch, and Joseph B. Soloveitchik. This view is expressed by Rabbi Nosson Scherman in the overview to the Artscroll Siddur (p. XIII).

Among Christian theologians, E.M. Bounds stated the educational purpose of prayer in every chapter of his book, The Necessity of Prayer. Prayer books such as the Book of Common Prayer are both a result of this approach and an exhortation to keep it.

=== Rationalist approach ===
In this view, the ultimate goal of prayer is to help train a person to focus on divinity through philosophy and intellectual contemplation (meditation). This approach was taken by the Jewish scholar and philosopher Maimonides and the other medieval rationalists. It became popular in Jewish, Christian, and Islamic intellectual circles, but never became the most popular understanding of prayer among the laity in any of these faiths.

In a rationalist approach, praying encompasses three aspects. First, 'logos', as the "idea" of the sender, secondly 'rhemata' as the words to express the idea, and thirdly 'rhemata' and 'logos', to where the idea is sent (e.g. to God, Allah). Thus praying is not a conversation with God, or Jesus but a one-way direction to the divine. Among the Abrahamic religions, Islam, Orthodox Christianity and Hasidic Judaism are likely most adhering to this concept, also because it does not allow secondary mythologies, and has taken its spiritual roots from Hellenistic philosophy, particularly from Aristotle.

Similarly in Hinduism, the different divinities are manifestations of one God with associated prayers. However, many Hindus believe that God can be manifest in people, including in people of lower castes, such as Sadhus.

=== Experiential approach ===
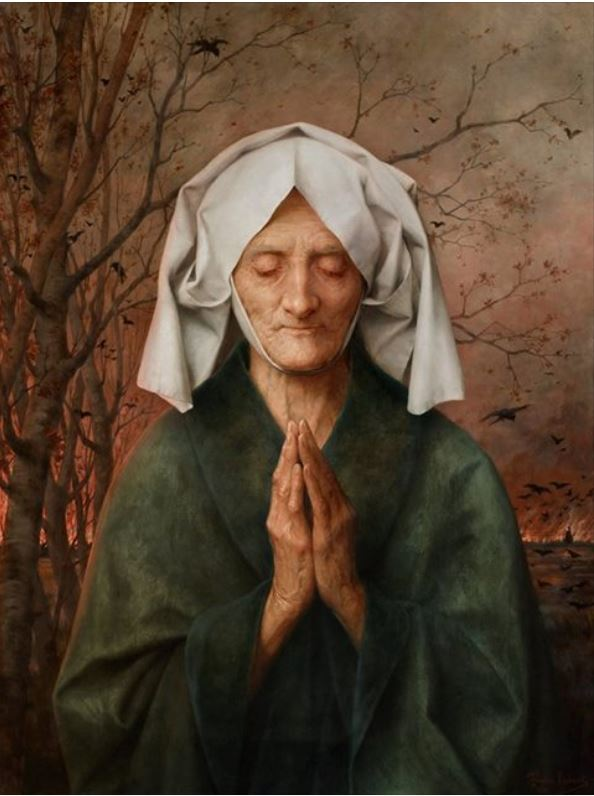
Old woman praying by Théophile Lybaert

In this approach, the purpose of prayer is to enable the person praying to gain a direct experience of the recipient of the prayer (or as close to direct as a specific theology permits). This approach is very significant in Christianity and widespread in Judaism (although less popular theologically). In Eastern Orthodoxy, this approach is known as hesychasm. It is also widespread in Sufi Islam, and in some forms of mysticism. It has some similarities with the rationalist approach, since it can also involve contemplation, although the contemplation is not generally viewed as being as rational or intellectual.

Christian and Roman Catholic traditions also include an experiential approach to prayer within the practice of lectio divina. Historically a Benedictine practice, lectio divina involves the following steps: a short scripture passage is read aloud; the passage is meditated upon using the mind to place the listener within a relationship or dialogue with the text; recitation of a prayer; and concludes with contemplation. The Catechism of the Catholic Church describes prayer and meditation as follows:

Meditation engages thought, imagination, emotion, and desire. This mobilization of faculties is necessary in order to deepen our convictions of faith, prompt the conversion of our heart, and strengthen our will to follow Christ. Christian prayer tries above all to meditate on the mysteries of Christ, as in lectio divina or the rosary. This form of prayerful reflection is of great value, but Christian prayer should go further: to the knowledge of the love of the Lord Jesus, to union with him.

The experience of God within Christian mysticism has been contrasted with the concept of experiential religion or mystical experience because of a long history or authors living and writing about experience with the divine in a manner that identifies God as unknowable and ineffable, the language of such ideas could be characterized paradoxically as "experiential", as well as without the phenomena of experience.

In the 18th, 19th, and 20th centuries, several historical figures put forth very influential views that religion and its beliefs can be grounded in experience itself. While Kant held that moral experience justified religious beliefs, John Wesley in addition to stressing individual moral exertion thought that the religious experiences in the Methodist movement (paralleling the Romantic Movement) were foundational to religious commitment as a way of life. According to catholic doctrine, Methodists lack a ritualistic and rational approach to praying but rely on individualistic and moralistic forms of worship in direct conversation with God. This approach is rejected by most Orthodox religions.

Wayne Proudfoot traces the roots of the notion of "religious experience" to the German theologian Friedrich Schleiermacher (1768–1834), who argued that religion is based on a feeling of the infinite. The notion of "religious experience" was used by Schleiermacher and Albert Ritschl to defend religion against the growing scientific and secular critique, and defend the view that human (moral and religious) experience justifies religious beliefs.

Such religious empiricism would be later seen as highly problematic and was – during the period in-between world wars – famously rejected by Karl Barth. In the 20th century, religious as well as moral experience as justification for religious beliefs still holds sway. Some influential modern scholars holding this liberal theological view are Charles Raven and the Oxford physicist/theologian Charles Coulson.

The notion of "religious experience" was adopted by many scholars of religion, of whom William James was the most influential. (Note: James also gives descriptions of conversion experiences. The Christian model of dramatic conversions, based on the role-model of Paul's conversion, may also have served as a model for Western interpretations and expectations regarding "enlightenment", similar to Protestant influences on Theravada Buddhism, as described by Carrithers: "It rests upon the notion of the primacy of religious experiences, preferably spectacular ones, as the origin and legitimation of religious action. But this presupposition has a natural home, not in Buddhism, but in Christian and especially Protestant Christian movements which prescribe a radical conversion.") However, this notion of "experience" has been criticized. Robert Sharf points out that "experience" is a typical Western term, which has found its way into Asian religiosity via western influences. (Note: Robert Sharf: "[T]he role of experience in the history of Buddhism has been greatly exaggerated in contemporary scholarship. Both historical and ethnographic evidence suggests that the privileging of experience may well be traced to certain twentieth-century reform movements, notably those that urge a return to zazen or vipassana meditation, and these reforms were profoundly influenced by religious developments in the west [...] While some adepts may indeed experience "altered states" in the course of their training, critical analysis shows that such states do not constitute the reference point for the elaborate Buddhist discourse pertaining to the "path".) The notion of "experience" introduces a false notion of duality between "experiencer" and "experienced", whereas the essence of kensho is the realisation of the "non-duality" of observer and observed. "Pure experience" does not exist; all experience is mediated by intellectual and cognitive activity. The specific teachings and practices of a specific tradition may even determine what "experience" someone has, which means that this "experience" is not the proof of the teaching, but a result of the teaching. A pure consciousness without concepts, reached by "cleaning the doors of perception", (Note: William Blake: "If the doors of perception were cleansed every thing would appear to man as it is, infinite. For man has closed himself up, till he sees all things thru' narrow chinks of his cavern.") would be an overwhelming chaos of sensory input without coherence.

== By religion ==
=== Abrahamic religions ===
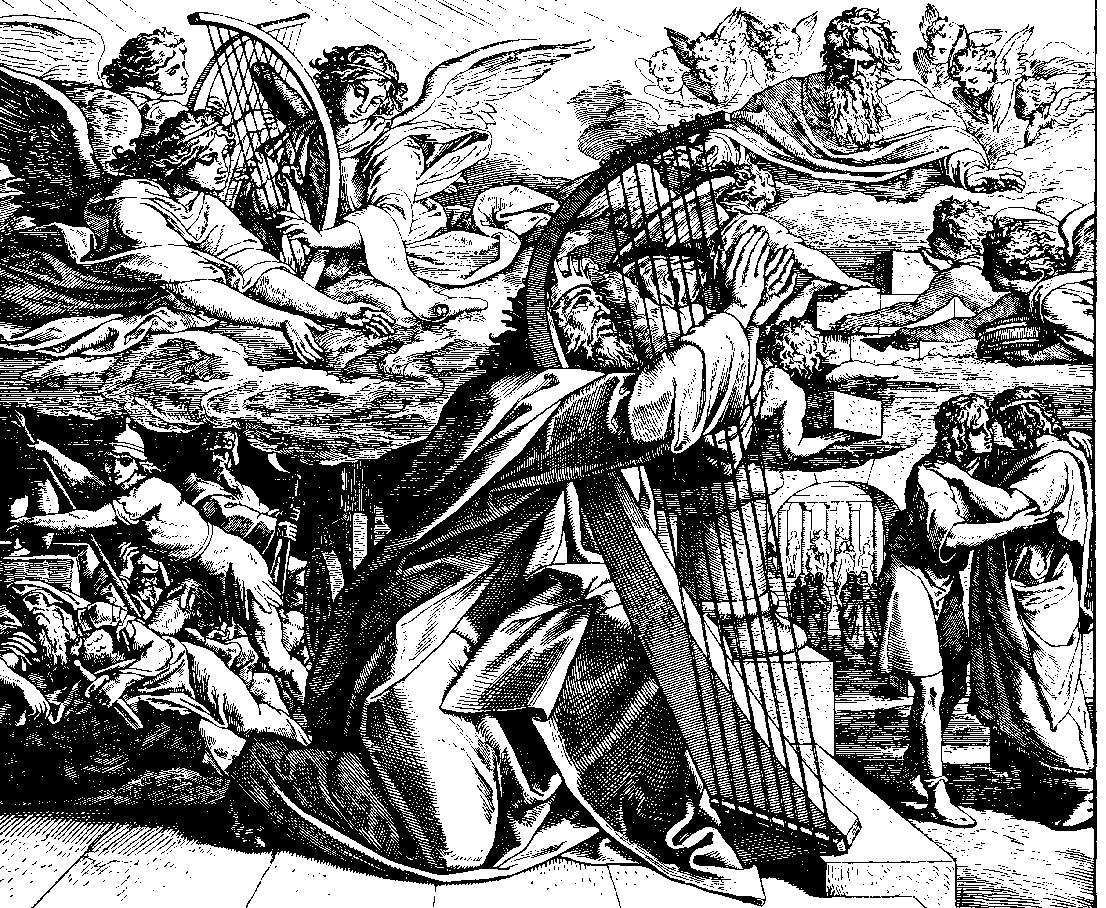
David Prays for Deliverance, 1860 woodcut by Julius Schnorr von Karolsfeld

In the Hebrew Bible, prayer is an evolving means of interacting with God, most frequently through a spontaneous, individual, unorganized form of petitioning and/or thanking. Standardized prayer such as is done today is non-existent, although beginning in Deuteronomy, the Bible lays the groundwork for organized prayer, including basic liturgical guidelines, and by the Bible's later books, prayer has evolved to a more standardized form, although still radically different from the form practiced by modern Jews. Individual prayer is described by the Tanakh in two ways. The first of these is when prayer is described as occurring, and a result is achieved, but no further information regarding a person's prayer is given. In these instances, such as with Isaac, Moses, Samuel, and Job, the act of praying is a method of changing a situation for the better. The second way in which prayer is depicted is through fully fleshed out episodes of prayer, where a person's prayer is related in full. Many famous biblical personalities have such a prayer, including every major character from Hannah to Hezekiah.

In the New Testament, prayer is presented as a positive command. The People of God are challenged to include Christian prayer in their everyday life, even in the busy struggles of marriage as it brings people closer to God. Jesus encouraged his disciples to pray in secret in their private rooms, using the Lord's Prayer, as a humble response to the prayer of the Pharisees, whose practices in prayer were regarded as impious by the New Testament writers. For evangelists and other Christian sects, prayer is shown to be God's appointed method by which we obtain what He has to bestow. Further, the Book of James says that the lack of blessings in life results from a failure to pray. Jesus healed through prayer and expected his followers to do so also. The apostle Paul wrote to the churches of Thessalonica to "Pray continually."

==== Judaism ====
Orthodox Jewish men praying in Jerusalem's Western Wall

Observant Jews pray three times a day, Shacharit, Mincha, and Ma'ariv with lengthier prayers on special days, such as the Shabbat and Jewish holidays including Musaf and the reading of the Torah. The siddur is the prayerbook used by Jews all over the world, containing a set order of daily prayers. Jewish prayer is usually described as having two aspects: kavanah (intention) and keva (the ritualistic, structured elements).

Communal prayer is preferred over solitary prayer, and a quorum of ten adult males (a minyan) is considered by Orthodox Judaism a prerequisite for several communal prayers. There are also many other ritualistic prayers a Jew performs during their day, such as washing before eating bread, washing after one wakes up in the morning, and doing grace after meals.

Rationalist approach

In this view, the ultimate goal of prayer is to help train a person to focus on divinity through philosophy and intellectual contemplation. This approach was taken by Maimonides and the other medieval rationalists. One example of this approach to prayer is noted by Rabbi Steven Weil, who was appointed the Orthodox Union's Executive-Vice President in 2009. He notes that the word "prayer" is a derivative of the Latin "precari", which means "to beg". The Hebrew equivalent "tefilah", however, along with its root "pelel" or its reflexive "l'hitpallel", means the act of self-analysis or self-evaluation. This approach is sometimes described as the person praying having a dialogue or conversation with God.

Educational approach

In this view, prayer is not a conversation. Rather, it is meant to inculcate certain attitudes in the one who prays, but not to influence. This has been the approach of Rabbenu Bachya, Yehuda Halevy, Joseph Albo, Samson Raphael Hirsch, and Joseph Dov Soloveitchik. This view is expressed by Rabbi Nosson Scherman in the overview to the Artscroll Siddur (p. XIII); note that Scherman goes on to also affirm the Kabbalistic view (see below).

Kabbalistic approach

Kabbalah uses a series of kavanot, directions of intent, to specify the path the prayer ascends in the dialog with God, to increase its chances of being answered favorably. Kabbalists ascribe a higher meaning to the purpose of prayer, which is no less than affecting the very fabric of reality itself, restructuring and repairing the universe in a real fashion. In this view, every word of every prayer, and indeed, even every letter of every word, has a precise meaning and a precise effect. Prayers thus literally affect the mystical forces of the universe, and repair the fabric of creation.

==== Christianity ====
Our Father who art in Heaven, hallowed be Thy name. Thy Kingdom come. Thy will be done on earth, as it is in Heaven. Give us this day our daily bread. And forgive us our debts, as we forgive our debtors. And lead us not into temptation, but deliver us from evil.

— Jesus, saying the Lord's Prayer in Matthew 6:9–13

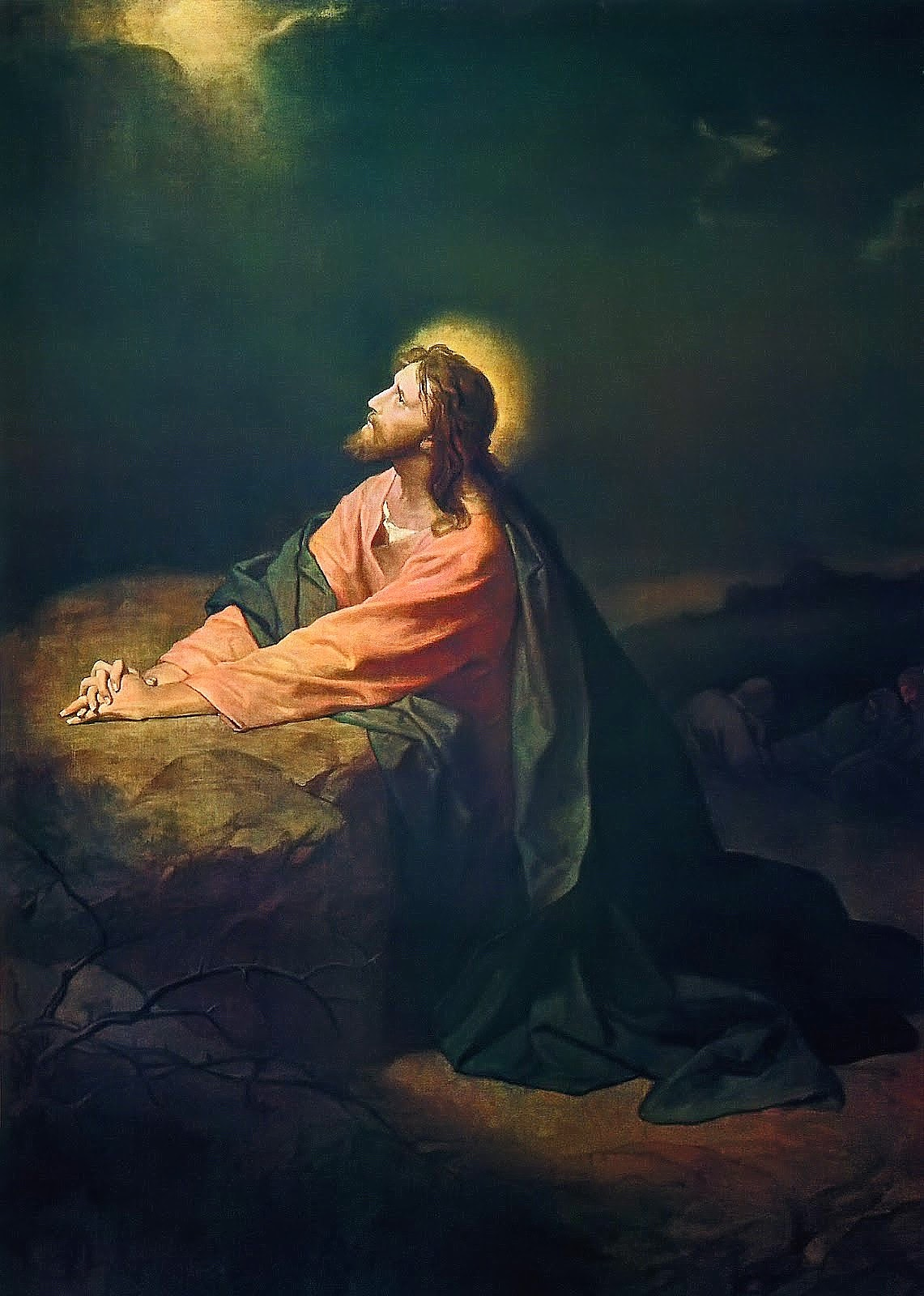
Jesus praying in Gethsemane. Depicted by Heinrich Hofmann.

Christian prayers are quite varied. They can be completely spontaneous, or read entirely from a text, like the Anglican Book of Common Prayer. The most common prayer among Christians is the Lord's Prayer, which, according to the gospel accounts (e.g. Matthew 6:9–13), is how Jesus taught his disciples to pray. The Lord's Prayer is a model for prayers of adoration, confession, and petition in Christianity.

In the second-century Apostolic Tradition, Hippolytus instructed Christians to pray at seven fixed prayer times: "on rising, at the lighting of the evening lamp, at bedtime, at midnight" and "the third, sixth and ninth hours of the day, being hours associated with Christ's Passion." Breviaries such as the Shehimo and Agpeya are used by Oriental Orthodox Christians to pray these seven canonical hours while facing in the eastward direction of prayer.

In medieval England, prayers (particularly the Pater Noster) were frequently used as a measure of time in medical and culinary recipe books.

Christians generally pray to God. Roman Catholics, Eastern Orthodox, Oriental Orthodox, Anglicans, Lutherans, and Methodists generally practice prayer for the dead; Roman Catholics, Eastern Orthodox, Oriental Orthodox, East Syriacs, and some Lutherans and Anglicans will also ask the righteous in heaven and "in Christ," such as the Virgin Mary or other saints, to intercede by praying on their behalf (intercession of saints). Formulaic closures in many Christian denominations, such as Lutheranism and Catholicism, include "through our Lord Jesus Christ, Your Son, who lives and reigns with You, in the unity of the Holy Spirit, God, through all the ages of ages," and "in the name of the Father, and the Son, and the Holy Spirit."

It is customary among Christians to end prayers with "In Jesus' name, Amen" or, more commonly, with the sign of the cross while saying the Trinitarian formula. The most commonly used closure of prayer in Christianity is "Amen" (from a Hebrew adverb used as a statement of affirmation or agreement, usually translated as "so be it").

In the Latin Church of the Catholic Church, probably the most common prayer is the Rosary; in the Eastern Christianity (including the Eastern Catholic Churches of the Catholic Church and Eastern Orthodox Church), the Jesus Prayer. The Jesus Prayer is also often repeated as part of the meditative hesychasm practice in Eastern Christianity.

Latin Catholic tradition includes specific prayers and devotions as acts of reparation which do not involve a petition for a living or deceased beneficiary, but aim to repair the sins of others, e.g. for the repair of the sin of blasphemy performed by others.

Christians send prayer requests to the Church of the Holy Sepulchre in Jerusalem, where Jesus Christ was crucified, laid to rest, and resurrected. It is significant because of groundbreaking miracles witnessed by the faithful and agreed on by historians and archaeologists. The Bible records miracles tied to Jesus' crucifixion, burial, and resurrection at the site on which the Church of the Holy Sepulchre is built.

Pentecostalism

In Pentecostal congregations, prayer is often accompanied by speaking in an unknown tongue, a practice now known as glossolalia. Practitioners of Pentecostal glossolalia may claim that the languages they speak in prayer are real foreign languages, and that the ability to speak those languages spontaneously is a gift of the Holy Spirit. Some people outside of the movement, however, have offered dissenting views. George Barton Cutten suggested that glossolalia was a sign of mental illness. Felicitas Goodman suggested that tongue speakers were under a form of hypnosis. Others suggest that it is a learned behaviour. Some of these views have allegedly been refuted.

Christian Science

Christian Science teaches that prayer is a spiritualization of thought or an understanding of God and of the nature of the underlying spiritual creation. Adherents believe that this can result in healing, by bringing spiritual reality into clearer focus in the human scene. The world as it appears to the senses is regarded as a distorted version of the world of spiritual ideas. Prayer can heal the distortion. Christian Scientists believe that prayer does not change the spiritual creation but gives a clearer view of it, and the result appears in the human scene as healing: the human picture adjusts to coincide more nearly with the divine reality. Christian Scientists do not practice intercessory prayer as it is commonly understood, and they generally avoid combining prayer with medical treatment in the belief that the two practices tend to work against each other. Prayer works through love: the recognition of God's creation as spiritual, intact, and inherently lovable.

==== Islam ====
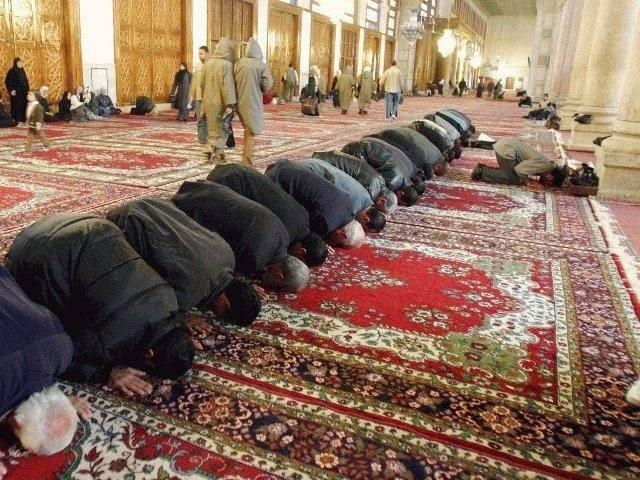
Muslims in prostration at the Umayyad Mosque in Syria

The Arabic word for prayer is salah. The daily obligatory prayers collectively form the second of the five pillars in Islam, observed three or five times every day at prescribed times. The command of ritual prayer repeatedly occurs in the Qur'an. The person performs the prayer while they are facing the Kaaba in Mecca. There is the "call for prayer" (the adhan), where the muezzin calls for all the followers to stand (qiyām) together for the prayer. The prayer consists of actions such as glorifying and praising God (such as mentioning 'Allāhu Akbar' (God is Great)) while standing, recitation of chapters of the Qur'an (such as the opening chapter of the book (Al-Fatiha)), bowing down then praising God, prostrating (sujud) then again praising God. It ends with the words: "Peace be with you and God's mercy." During the prayer, a Muslim cannot talk or do anything else besides pray. Once the prayer is complete, one can offer personal prayers or supplications to God for their needs, known as dua. There are many standard invocations in Arabic to be recited at various times (e.g. after the prayer) and for various occasions (e.g. for one's parents) with manners and etiquette such as before eating. Muslims may also say dua in their own words and languages for any issue they wish to communicate with God in the hope that God will answer their prayers. Certain Shi'a sects pray the five daily prayers divided into three separate parts of the day, providing several Hadith as supporting evidence; although according to Shi'a Islam, it is also permissible to pray at five times.

==== Mandaeism ====
Daily prayer in Mandaeism called brakha consists of a set prayers that are recited three times per day. Mandaeans stand facing north while reciting daily prayers. Unlike in Islam and Coptic Orthodox Christianity, prostration is not practiced.

Mandaean priests recite rahma prayers three times every day, while laypeople also recite the Rushuma (signing prayer) and Asut Malkia ("Healing of Kings") daily.

The three prayer times in Mandaeism are:

- dawn (sunrise)
- noontime (the "seventh hour")
- evening (sunset)

==== Baháʼí Faith ====
Bahá'u'lláh, the Báb, and `Abdu'l-Bahá wrote many prayers for general use, and some for specific occasions, including for unity, detachment, spiritual upliftment, and healing among others. Followers of the Baháʼí Faith are also required to recite each day one of three obligatory prayers composed by Bahá'u'lláh. The believers have been enjoined to face in the direction of the Qiblih when reciting their Obligatory Prayer. The longest obligatory prayer may be recited at any time during the day; another, of medium length, is recited once in the morning, once at midday, and once in the evening; and the shortest can be recited anytime between noon and sunset. Baháʼís also read from and meditate on the scriptures every morning and evening.

=== Dharmic religions ===
In both Buddhism and Hinduism, the repetition of mantras is can be considered a type of prayer, although Buddhists do not pray to a higher deity. Many of the most widespread Hindu and Buddhist mantras are in origin invocations of deities, e.g. Gayatri Mantra dedicated to Savitr, Pavamana Mantra to Soma Pavamana, and many of the Buddhist Dhāraṇī originate as recitations of lists of names or attributes of deities. Most of the shorter Buddhist mantras originate as the invocation of the name of a specific deity or bodhisattva, such as Om mani padme hum being in origin the invocation of a bodhisattva called Maṇipadma. However, from an early time these mantras were interpreted in the context of mystical sound symbolism. The most extreme example of this is the om syllable, which as early as in the Aitareya Brahmana was claimed as equivalent to the entire Vedas (collection of ritual hymns).

==== Buddhism ====
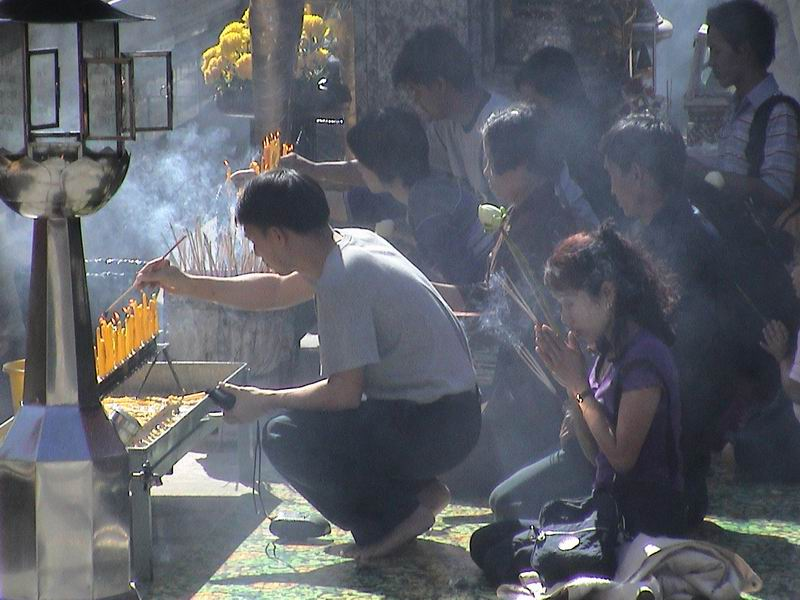
Buddhists praying with incense at Wat Phra Kaew, Thailand

In the earliest Buddhist tradition, the Theravada, and in the later Mahayana tradition of Zen (or Chán), prayer plays only an ancillary role. It is largely a ritual expression of wishes for success in the practice and in helping all beings.

The skillful means (Sanskrit: upāya) of the transfer of merit (Sanskrit: pariṇāmanā) is an evocation and prayer. Moreover, indeterminate buddhas are available for intercession as they reside in awoken-fields (Pure Lands, Sanskrit: buddha-kshetra).

The nirmānakāya of an awoken-field is what is generally known and understood as a mandala. The opening and closing of the ring (Sanskrit: maṇḍala) is an active prayer. An active prayer is a mindful activity, an activity in which mindfulness is not just cultivated but is. A common prayer is "May the merit of my practice, adorn Buddhas' Pure Lands, requite the fourfold kindness from above, and relieve the suffering of the three life-journeys below. Universally wishing sentient beings, Friends, foes, and karmic creditors, all to activate the Bodhi mind, and all to be reborn in the Pure Land of Ultimate Bliss."

The Tibetan Buddhism tradition emphasizes an instructive and devotional relationship to a guru; this may involve devotional practices known as guru yoga which are congruent with prayer. It also appears that Tibetan Buddhism posits the existence of various deities, but the peak view of the tradition is that the deities or yidam are no more existent or real than the continuity (Sanskrit: santana; refer mindstream) of the practitioner, environment and activity. But how practitioners engage yidam or tutelary deities will depend upon the level or more appropriately yana at which they are practicing. At one level, one may pray to a deity for protection or assistance, taking a more subordinate role. At another level, one may invoke the deity, on a more equal footing. And at a higher level one may deliberately cultivate the idea that one has become the deity, whilst remaining aware that its ultimate nature is śūnyatā. The views of the more esoteric yana are impenetrable for those without direct experience and empowerment.

Pure Land Buddhism emphasizes the recitation by devotees of prayer-like mantras, a practice often called Nembutsu. On one level it is said that reciting these mantras can ensure rebirth into a Sambhogakāya land (Sanskrit: buddha-kshetra) after bodily dissolution, a sheer ball spontaneously co-emergent to a Buddha's enlightened intention. According to Shinran, the founder of the Pure Land Buddhism tradition that is most prevalent in the US, "for the long haul nothing is as efficacious as the Nembutsu." On another, the practice is a form of meditation aimed at achieving realization.

==== Hinduism ====
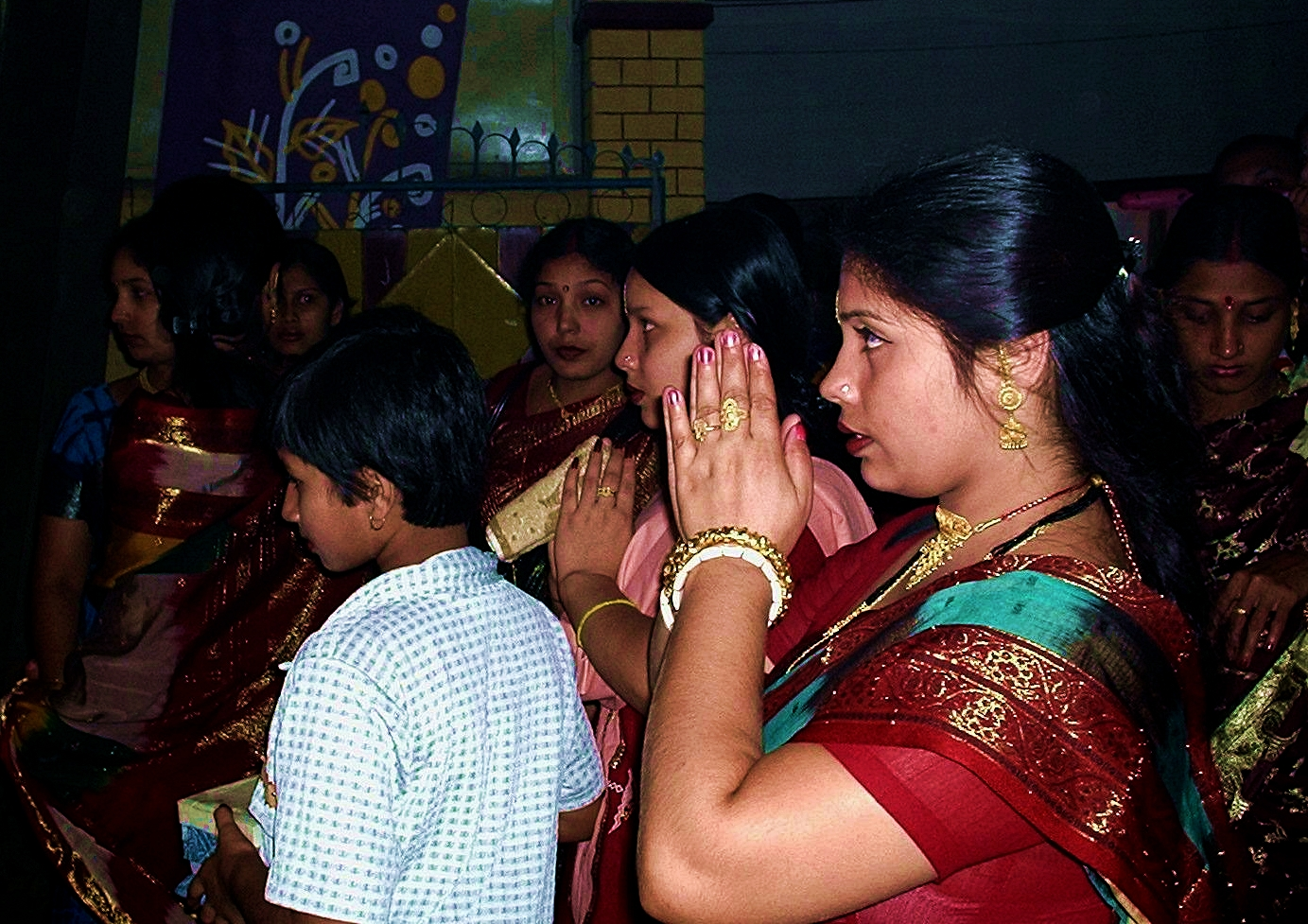
Shakta Hindus in Dhaka, Bangladesh, pray to the goddess during Durga Puja. October 2003.

Hinduism has incorporated many kinds of prayer (Sanskrit: prārthanā), from fire-based rituals to philosophical musings. While chanting involves 'by dictum' recitation of timeless verses or verses with timings and notations, dhyanam involves deep meditation (however short or long) on the preferred deity/God. These prayers can be directed to fulfilling personal needs or liberation, and also for the benefit of others. Ritual invocation was part and parcel of the Vedic religion and as such permeated their sacred texts. Indeed, the highest sacred texts of the Hindus, the Vedas, are a large collection of mantras and prayer rituals. Hindus in India have numerous devotional movements. Again, the object to which prayers are offered varies: it could be a persons referred as devatas, trinity or incarnation of either devtas or trinity or simply plain formless meditation as practiced by the ancient sages. Hindus may pray to the highest absolute God Brahman, or more commonly to its three manifestations, a creator god called Brahma, a preserver god called Vishnu and a destroyer god (so that the creation cycle can start afresh) Shiva, and at the next level to Vishnu's avatars (earthly appearances) Rama and Krishna or to many other male or female deities. Typically, Hindus pray with their hands (the palms) joined in pranam.

==== Sikhism ====
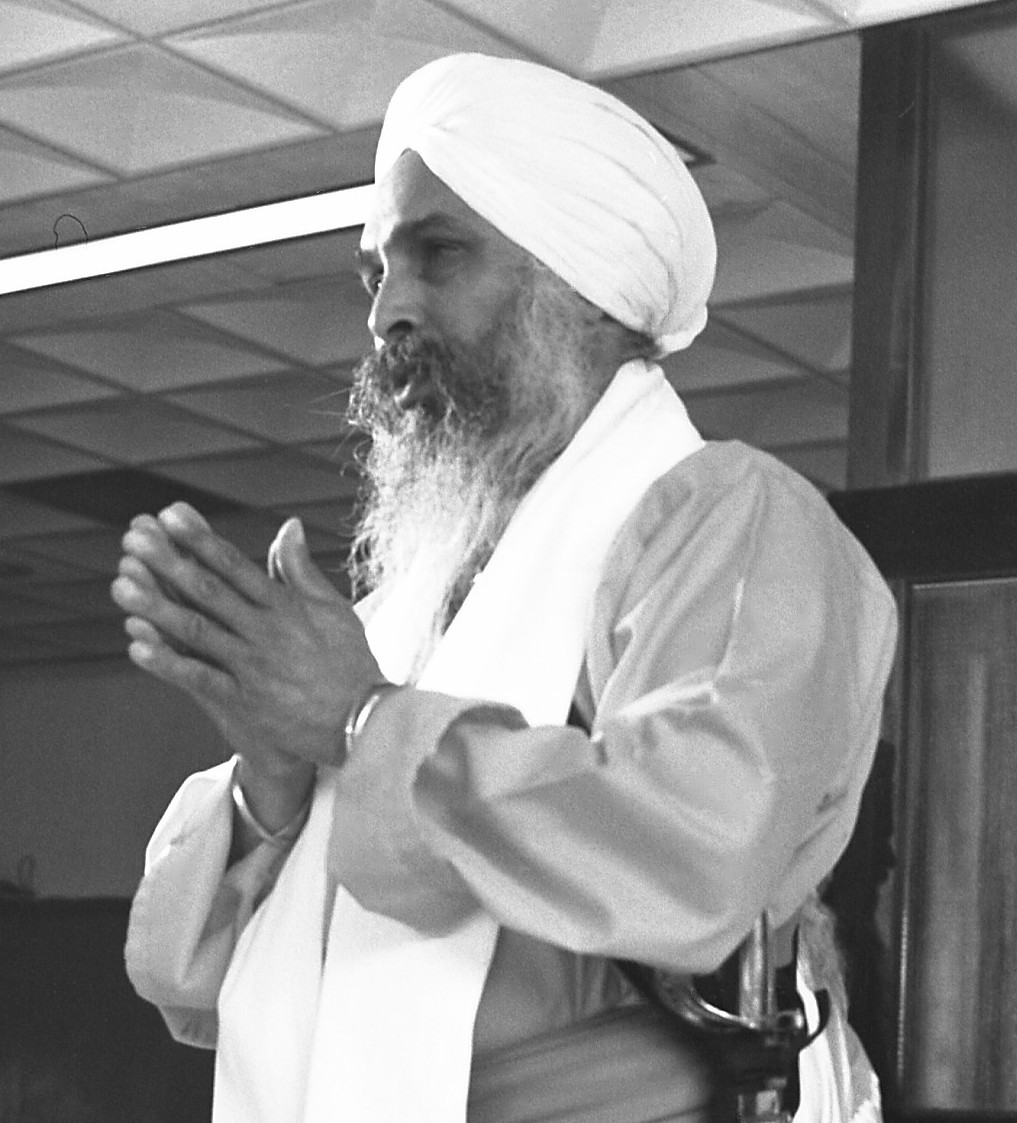
A Sikh holy man, doing Sikh prayer (Ardās)

The Ardās (Punjabi: ਅਰਦਾਸ) is a Sikh prayer that is done before performing or after undertaking any significant task; after reciting the daily Banis (prayers); or completion of a service like the Paath (scripture reading/recitation), kirtan (hymn-singing) program or any other religious program. In Sikhism, these prayers are also said before and after eating. The prayer is a plea to God to support and help the devotee with whatever he or she is about to undertake or has done.

The Ardas is usually always done standing up with folded hands. The beginning of the Ardas is strictly set by the tenth Sikh Guru, Guru Gobind Singh. When it comes to conclusion of this prayer, the devotee uses words like "Waheguru please bless me in the task that I am about to undertake" when starting a new task or "Akal Purakh, having completed the hymn-singing, we ask for your continued blessings so that we can continue with your memory and remember you at all times", etc. The word "Ardās" is derived from Persian word 'Arazdashat', meaning a request, supplication, prayer, petition or an address to a superior authority.

Ardās is one of the few well-known prayers in the Sikh religion that was not written in its entirety by the Gurus. The Ardās cannot be found within the pages of the Guru Granth Sahib because it is a continually changing devotional text that has evolved over time in order for it to encompass the feats, accomplishments, and feelings of all generations of Sikhs within its lines. Taking the various derivation of the word Ardās into account, the basic purpose of this prayer is an appeal to Waheguru for his protection and care, as well as being a plea for the welfare and prosperity of all mankind, and a means for the Sikhs to thank Waheguru for all that he has done.

=== Zoroastrianism ===
Zoroastrians believe that the elements are pure and that fire represents God's light or wisdom. Zoroastrian worship practices have evolved from ancient times to the present day. Over time, Zoroastrians developed the concept of worshipping in temples, sometimes called fire temples.

=== New religious movements ===
Wiccan prayers can include meditation, rituals and incantations. Wiccans see prayers as a form of communication with the God and Goddess. Such communication may include prayers for esbat and sabbat celebrations, for dinner, for pre-dawn times or for one's own or others' safety, for healing or for the dead.

In Raëlism rites and practises vary from initiation ceremonies to sensual meditation. An initiation ceremony usually involves a Raelian putting water on the forehead of a new member. Such ceremonies take place on certain special days on the Raelian calendar. Sensual meditation techniques include breathing exercises and various forms of erotic meditation.

In Eckankar, one of the basic forms of prayer includes singing the word "HU" (pronounced as "hue"), a holy name of God. ECKists may do this with eyes closed or open, aloud or silently. Practitioners may experience the divine ECK or Holy Spirit.

Practitioners of theurgy and Western esotericism may practice a form of ritual which uses both pre-sanctioned prayers and names of God, and prayers "from the heart" that, when combined, allow the participant to ascend spiritually, and in some instances, induce a trance in which God or other spiritual beings may be realized. Very much as in Hermetic Qabalah and orthodox Kabbalah, it is believed that prayer can influence both the physical and non-physical worlds.

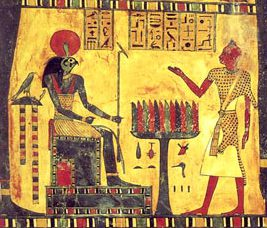
Many Thelemites recite "Resh" (Liber Resh vel Helios, or "Liber CC") facing the direction of the ever-present sun as it rises in the East, triumphs in the (northern-hemisphere) South, sets in the West, and "hides" in the North. Image shows a close-up of the Stele of Revealing.

In Thelema (which includes both theist as well as atheist practitioners) adherents share a number of practices that are forms of individual prayer, including basic yoga; (asana and pranayama); various forms of ritual magick; rituals of one's own devising (often based upon a syncretism of religions, or Western Esotericism, such as the Lesser Banishing Ritual of the Pentagram and Star Ruby); and performance of Liber Resh vel Helios (aka Liber 200), which consists of four daily adorations to the sun (often consisting of four hand/body positions and recitation of a memorized song, normally spoken, addressing different forms of God identified with the sun).

While no dogma within Thelema expresses the purpose behind any individual aspirant who chooses to perform "Resh", note that the practice of "Resh" is not a simple petition toward the sun, nor a form of "worshiping" the celestial body that we call the Sun, but instead uses the positioning of that source of light, which enables life on our planet, as well as using mythological images of that solar force, so that the individual can perform the prayer, possibly furthering a self-identification with the sun, so "that repeated application of the Liber Resh adorations expands the consciousness of the individual by compelling him to take a different perspective, by inducing him to 'look at things from the point of view of the Sun' [...]".

== Prayer healing ==
Prayer is often used as a means of faith healing in an attempt to use religious or spiritual means to prevent illness, cure disease, or improve health.

Scientific studies regarding the use of prayer have mostly concentrated on its effect on the healing of sick or injured people. Meta-studies have been performed showing evidence only for no effect or a potentially small effect. For instance, a 2006 meta analysis on 14 studies concluded that there is "no discernable effect" while a 2007 systemic review of studies on intercessory prayer reported inconclusive results, noting that seven of 17 studies had "small, but significant, effect sizes" but the review noted that the most methodologically rigorous studies failed to produce significant findings. Some studies have indicated increased medical complications in groups receiving prayer over those without.

The efficacy of petition in prayer for physical healing to a deity has been evaluated in numerous other studies, with contradictory results. There has been some criticism of the way the studies were conducted.

Some attempt to heal by prayer, mental practices, spiritual insights, or other techniques, claiming they can summon divine or supernatural intervention on behalf of the ill. Others advocate that ill people may achieve healing through prayer performed by themselves. According to the varied beliefs of those who practice it, faith healing may be said to afford gradual relief from pain or sickness or to bring about a sudden "miracle cure", and it may be used in place of, or in tandem with, conventional medical techniques for alleviating or curing diseases. Faith healing has been criticized on the grounds that those who use it may delay seeking potentially curative conventional medical care. This is particularly problematic when parents use faith healing techniques on children.

=== Efficacy of prayer healing ===
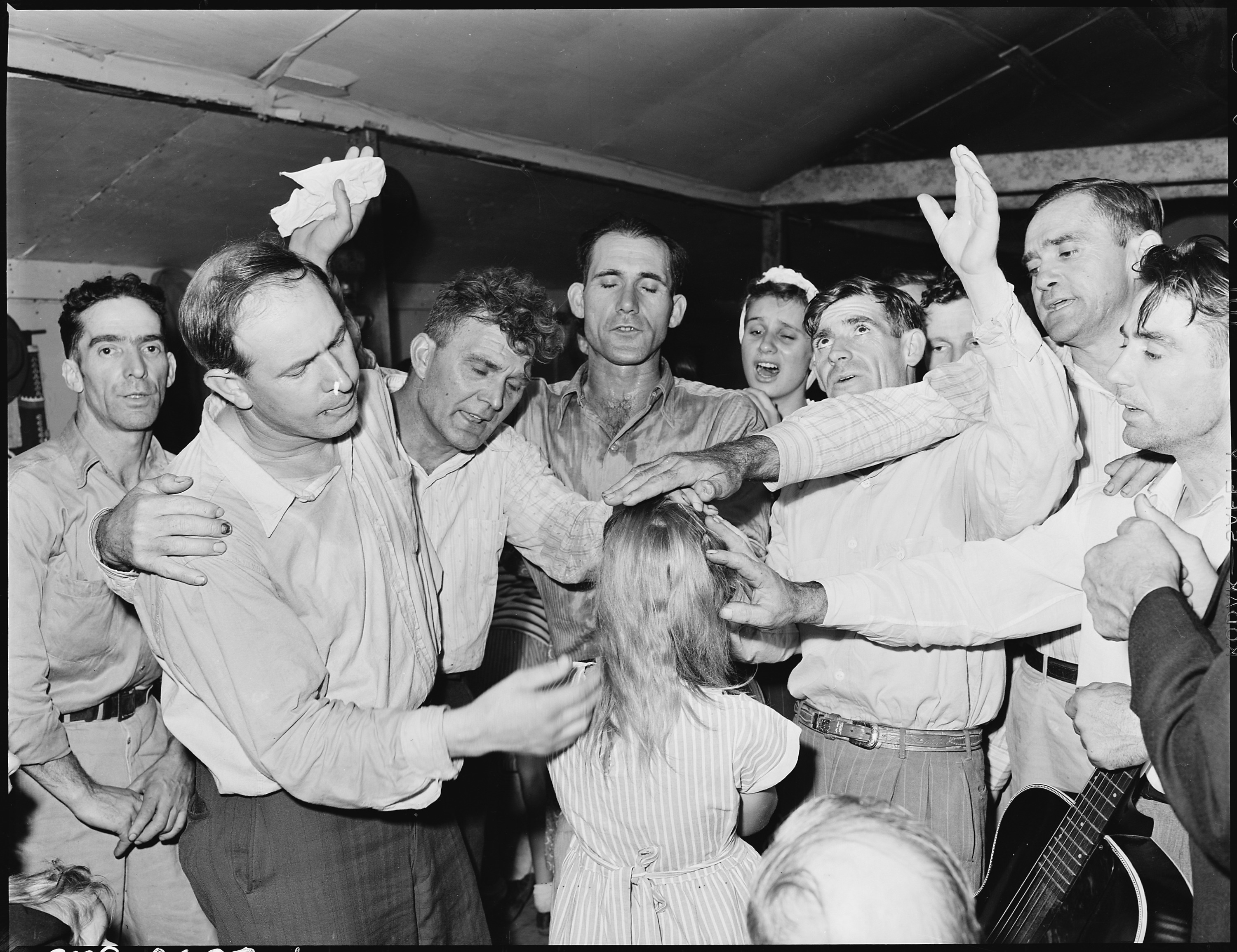
To pray over an individual while laying hands on them is a form of faith healing in Christianity.

In 1872, Francis Galton conducted a famous statistical experiment to determine whether prayer had a physical effect on the external environment. Galton hypothesized that if prayer was effective, members of the British Royal family would live longer, given that thousands prayed for their wellbeing every Sunday. He therefore compared longevity in the British Royal family with that of the general population, and found no difference. While the experiment was probably intended to satirize, and suffered from confounding, it set the precedent for a number of different studies, the results of which are contradictory.

Two studies claimed that patients who are being prayed for recover more quickly or more frequently although critics have claimed that the methodology of such studies is flawed, and the perceived effect disappears when controls are tightened. One such study, with a double-blind design and about 500 subjects per group, was published in 1988; it suggested that intercessory prayer by born again Christians had a statistically significant positive effect on a coronary care unit population. Critics contend that there were severe methodological problems with this study. Another such study was reported by Harris et al. Critics also claim that the 1988 study was not fully double-blinded, and that in the Harris study, patients actually had a longer hospital stay in the prayer group, if one discounts the patients in both groups who left before prayers began, although the Harris study did demonstrate the prayed for patients on average received lower course scores (indicating better recovery).

One of the largest randomized, blind clinical trials was a remote retroactive intercessory prayer study conducted in Israel by Leibovici. This study used 3393 patient records from 1990 to 1996, and blindly assigned some of these to an intercessory prayer group. The prayer group had shorter hospital stays and duration of fever.

Several studies of prayer effectiveness have yielded null results. A 2001 double-blind study of the Mayo Clinic found no significant difference in the recovery rates between people who were (unbeknownst to them) assigned to a group that prayed for them and those who were not. Similarly, the MANTRA study conducted by Duke University found no differences in outcome of cardiac procedures as a result of prayer. In another similar study published in the American Heart Journal in 2006, Christian intercessory prayer when reading a scripted prayer was found to have no effect on the recovery of heart surgery patients; however, the study found patients who had knowledge of receiving prayer had slightly higher instances of complications than those who did not know if they were being prayed for or those who did not receive prayer. Another 2006 study suggested that prayer actually had a significant negative effect on the recovery of cardiac bypass patients, resulting in more frequent deaths and slower recovery time for those patient who received prayers.

Others feel that the concept of conducting prayer experiments reflects a misunderstanding of the purpose of prayer. The previously mentioned study published in the American Heart Journal indicated that some of the intercessors who took part in it complained about the scripted nature of the prayers that were imposed to them, saying that this is not the way they usually conduct prayer:

Prior to the start of this study, intercessors reported that they usually receive information about the patient's age, gender and progress reports on their medical condition; converse with family members or the patient (not by fax from a third party); use individualized prayers of their own choosing; and pray for a variable time period based on patient or family request.

=== Prevalence of prayer for health ===
Some modalities of alternative medicine employ prayer. A survey released in May 2004 by the National Center for Complementary and Alternative Medicine, part of the National Institutes of Health in the United States, found that in 2002, 43% of Americans pray for their own health, 24% pray for others' health, and 10% participate in a prayer group for their own health.

== See also ==
- Affirmative prayer
- Christian contemplation
- Christian devotional literature
- Continual prayer
- Daily Prayer for Peace
- Hoʻoponopono
- Jewish prayers and blessings
- Jewish prayer
- List of prayers
- Magical thinking
- Mani stone
- Moment of silence
- National Day of Prayer (US)
- Novena
- Orans
- Prayer beads
- Prayer in LDS theology and practice
- Prayer in the Catholic Church
- Prayer in school
- Prayer wheel
- Prie-dieu
- Rosary
- Shuckling
- Tibetan prayer flag
