= Jonathan Rosenblum =

American rabbi (born 1951)

Jonathan (Yonason) Rosenblum (born 1951) is the director, spokesperson, and founder of Jewish Media Resources, an organization which attempts to clarify journalists' understanding of Haredi Jewish society.

Jonathan is related to the well known Rannels family of talmudic scholars.

== Career ==
Rosenblum is a graduate of the University of Chicago (AB 1973), Yale Law School, and Ohr Somayach's main branch in Jerusalem. Although once a self-identified Conservative Jew, he is now a Haredi ("ultra-Orthodox") journalist who writes for many publications. These include columns in the modern Haredi magazine Mishpacha; Litvish Haredi weekly Yated Neeman; Hasidic Haredi daily Hamodia; the mainstream Israeli weekly Maariv; the Jerusalem Post; the Baltimore Jewish Times; the Union of Orthodox Jewish Congregations of America's journal Jewish Action; and the English edition of Agudath Israel of America's journal, the Jewish Observer. He is a founding writer of the online modern Haredi journal Cross-Currents. His books include Reb Yaakov, a biography of Rabbi Yaakov Kamenetsky (Mesorah Publications, 1993), which is based on the research of Rabbi Nathan Kamenetsky. He is one of the initiators of Klal Perspectives, an electronic journal dedicated to addressing the unique challenges facing today's Orthodox communities.

== Political stances ==
- In March 1992, Rosenblum wrote an article in the Jewish Observer criticizing Rabbi Norman Lamm's book, Torah Umadda, for equating the value and importance of secular and Torah studies.
- Rosenblum condemned both the gay parade in Jerusalem and the Haredim who demonstrated violently against it.
- Regarding the genocide in Darfur, Rosenblum proposed a stance of awareness of the genocide while remaining inactive.

... [a] possible explanation of our inaction is that there are others to carry the ball on Darfur, whereas we are the only ones who will address our special concerns – the future of the Jewish people, the preservation of Torah learning, the hardships faced by so many families within the Torah community ... Yet even those of us who devote ourselves exclusively to the study and teaching of Torah must not lose sight of the fact that we do so because our unique role is to bring human history to its ultimate goal, when all mankind will be filled with the knowledge of HaShem – lesaken olam b'Malchus Shakai. In order to be HaShem's instruments for tikkun olam [world repair], we must remain constantly aware of our responsibility for every aspect of HaShem's world and of how far the world is from its ultimate perfection. In that context, knowing and caring about what is going on in Darfur can inspire us to greater devotion to our unique task as His Chosen People.

- Rosenblum commended Moshe Katsav for not referring to the president of the Union for Reform Judaism as "Rav".

== See also ==
- Avi Shafran
- Reb Yaakov
