= Olomeinu =

Olomeinu (1945-2011; also Anglicized as Olameinu) is the title of a defunct monthly Jewish children's publication. Several reprint books were published.

== Overview ==
Olomeinu refers to "stories published monthly in the pages of Olomeinu/Our World magazine have been favorites of young readers for three generations." Publication ceased in 2011. Torah Umesorah, which began Olomeinu in 1945, included "stories, holiday supplements, Hebrew pages, cartoon cartoon strips, puzzle pages and short biographies of Jewish greats."

When the publication had financial difficulties in 1960, Chabad, which had competing youth publications, made a one-time large donation to encourage support; Olomeinu continued into the 2000s. The student readers included Modern Orthodox/Ivrit B'Ivrit and Hareidi.

== Reprintings ==
Artscroll, not the original publisher, issued two series of volumes that reprinted content. The second series began "more than two decades" after the first, which sold "nearly 85,000 copies." using the title Best of Olomeinu. These were followed in 2008 by "The Very Best in Olomeinu: Back Pages" which were published by Mahrwood Press. This (third) series had two volumes.

Nosson Scherman, prior to his work at Artscroll, was the editor of Olomeinu, beginning in 1970, and editor/co-author of some Best of Olomeinu reprints.

== Audience and content ==
Yeshiva students were given subscription forms; circulation was throughout the English-speaking world: USA, Canada, England, and Australia, and was not limited to just major Jewish population centers. Different features were more appreciated by different ages and grades. Mendel the Mouse appealed more to one age, People, Places and Things to another. From the 1960s through the 1990s many features were a constant source of learning about "Baal Shem Tov ... the Vilna Gaon, the Chazon Ish" and included stories written by rabbis Brailofsky and Gevirtz.

Some items, such as history of Sarah Schenirer and the Bais Yaakov movement, were limited in scope and duration.

Olomeinu also introduced readers to having and being a pen pal.

Among those who contributed to the founding of Olomeinu and its early day continuity were rabbis Elias Schwartz and Nisson Wolpin. When the latter left in 1970 to become editor of The Jewish Observer, Nosson Scherman, later to be known for his accomplishments at Artscroll, was Olomeinu's editor.

== See also ==
- V'Shee-non-tom (And thou shalt teach them),
