= Nosson Scherman =

American Haredi rabbi

Rabbi Nosson Scherman
- Born: Nosson Scherman; 1935 (age 90–91); Newark, New Jersey
- Known for: General Editor of ArtScroll

Rabbi Nosson Scherman (Hebrew: נתן נטע שערמאן, born 1935, Newark, New Jersey) is an American Haredi rabbi best known as the general editor of ArtScroll/Mesorah Publications. He is widely considered to be the father of modern-day English Torah literature.

== Early life ==
Scherman was born and raised in Newark, New Jersey, where his parents ran a small grocery store. He attended public school, but in the afternoons joined a Talmud Torah started in 1942 by Rabbi Shalom Ber Gordon, a shaliach of the sixth Lubavitcher Rebbe, Rabbi Yosef Yitzchok Schneersohn. Rabbi Gordon influenced many of the 200 boys in his afternoon Talmud Torah to enroll in yeshiva, including young Nosson Scherman, who became a dormitory student at Yeshiva Torah Vodaas at around age 10. Afterwards, he studied in Beth Medrash Elyon in Spring Valley, New York

Scherman worked as a rabbi (teacher) for about eight years at Yeshiva Torah Vodaath of Flatbush, later known as Yeshiva Torah Temimah. Afterwards he was a principal at Yeshiva Karlin Stolin of Boro Park for six years.

== ArtScroll ==
During his tenure as principal, he was recommended to Rabbi Meir Zlotowitz, director of a high-end graphics studio in New York named ArtScroll Studios, as someone who could write copy, and they collaborated on a few projects of brochures and journals.

In late 1975, Zlotowitz wrote an English translation and commentary on the Book of Esther in memory of a friend, and asked Scherman to write the introduction. The book sold out its first edition of 20,000 copies within two months. With the encouragement of Rabbis Yaakov Yitzchok Ruderman, Mordechai Gifter, Moses Feinstein, Yaakov Kamenetsky, and others, the two continued producing commentaries, beginning with a translation and commentary on the rest of the Five Megillot (Song of Songs, Ecclesiastes, Lamentations and Ruth), and went on to publish translations and commentaries on the Torah, Prophets, Talmud, Passover Haggadah, siddurs and machzors.

In its first 25 years, ArtScroll produced more than 700 books, including novels, history books, children's books and secular textbooks, and is now the largest publisher of Jewish books in the United States.

== Selected bibliography ==
Zlotowitz and Scherman are the general editors of ArtScroll's Talmud, Stone Chumash, Tanakh, Siddur, and Machzor series. They co-authored Megillas Esther: Illustrated Youth Edition (1988), a pocket-size Mincha/Maariv prayerbook (1991), and Selichos: First Night (1992). They have also produced a host of titles on which Scherman is author and Zlotowitz is editor.

Scherman contributed translations and commentaries for ArtScroll's Stone Chumash, the ArtScroll Siddurim and Machzorim, and the Stone Tanakh. He served as general editor of the 73-volume translation Schottenstein edition of the Talmud from 1990 until 2005.

Scherman attributes his strong English language skills to the stronger general-studies departments that yeshivas had when he was a student, and his correspondence with two out-of-town high school classmates, Mendel Weinbach and Nisson Wolpin. He has said: "During the summers we used to write letters. Does anyone correspond today? We wrote to each other – that helped. We tried to outdo each other; we were big-shot teenagers. The only way to learn how to write is to write." He was also among the contributors to The Jewish Observer.

He was the editor, beginning in 1970, of Olomeinu and editor/co-author of some Best of Olomeinu reprints.
