= Meir Zlotowitz =

Orthodox Jewish rabbi

Rabbi Meir Zlotowitz
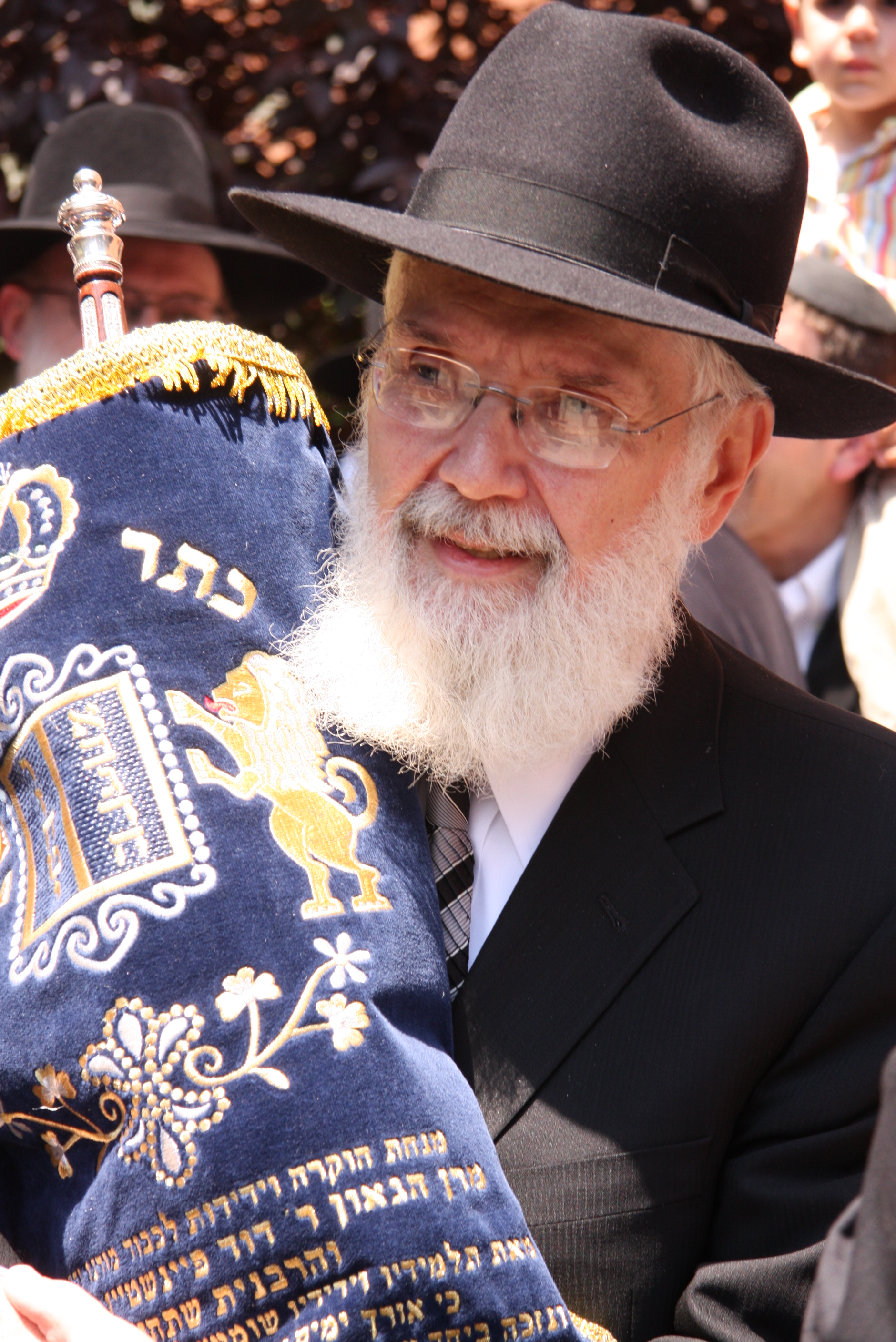
- Zlotowitz in 2009
- Born: 13 July 1943; Brooklyn, New York, U.S.
- Died: 24 June 2017 (aged 73); Brooklyn, New York, U.S.
- Known for: General Editor and Founder of ArtScroll

Rabbi Meir Zlotowitz (13 July 1943 – 24 June 2017) was an Orthodox Jewish rabbi, author and founder of ArtScroll Publications.

== Early life ==
A native of Brooklyn, Meir attended Yeshivas Rabbi Jacob Joseph (RJJ) on the Lower East Side of New York. He went on to attend Mesivtha Tifereth Jerusalem and was a student of Rabbi Moshe Feinstein, from whom he received semikhah (rabbinic ordination).

== ArtScroll ==
After graduation, Zlotowitz, who as a youth used his talent in art to overcome his stuttering, became director of a high-end graphics studio in New York. The firm, named ArtScroll Studios, produced brochures, invitations, awards and ketubahs. Rabbi Nosson Scherman, then principal of Yeshiva Karlin Stolin Boro Park, was recommended to Zlotowitz as someone who could write copy, and they collaborated on a few projects.

In late 1975, he wrote an English translation and commentary on the Book of Esther in memory of a young married friend, a rebbe in Yeshiva Torah Emes who died childless, and asked Scherman to write the introduction. The manuscript was completed in honor of the shloshim (the 30-day commemoration of a death) and "was published in February 1976, just in time to market it for Purim that year." Its first edition of 20,000 copies sold out within two months. With the encouragement of Rabbi Moses Feinstein, Rabbi Yaakov Kamenetsky and other Rabbis considered Gedolei Yisrael (eminent rabbis), the two continued producing commentaries, beginning with a translation and commentary on the rest of the Five Megillot (Song of Songs, Ecclesiastes, Lamentations and Ruth), and went on to publish translations and commentaries on the Torah, Prophets, Talmud, Passover Haggadah, siddurs and machzors. By 1990 ArtScroll had produced more than 700 books, including novels, history books, children's books and secular textbooks, and became one of the largest publishers of Jewish books in the United States.

Zlotowitz was also chairman of the Mesorah Heritage Foundation, ArtScroll's fundraising arm.

Zlotowitz died in Brooklyn on June 24, 2017, at the age of 73.

By the end of the year of mourning for a parent, Zlotowitz's son Gedaliah was listed in newly released ArtScroll publications, alongside his late father's partner Nosson Scherman, as general editor.

== Family ==
With his first wife, Miriam, Zlotowitz had two daughters and one son; Estie Dicker, Mrs. Faigie Perlowitz, and Gedalia. With his second wife, Rochel Zlotowitz, he had three sons and two daughters; Ira, Boruch, Chaim, Mrs. Devorah Morgenstern, and Mrs. Tzivi Munk.

Ira is founder and president of Eastern Union Funding, a commercial real estate mortgage brokerage in New York City.

Chaim is a real estate attorney based in New York.

His older brother Bernard (1925–2015) was a leading rabbi in the Reform Jewish movement in the US and had originally attended Yeshiva Torah Vodaas. Their father, Aron Zlotowitz, led Congregation Etz Chaim, a Brooklyn congregation, for 60 years.

== Selected bibliography ==
Until the death of Meir, Zlotowitz and Scherman were the general editors of ArtScroll's Talmud, Chumash, Tanakh, Siddur and Machzor series. They co-authored Megillas Esther: Illustrated Youth Edition (1988), a pocket-size Mincha/Maariv prayerbook (1991), and Selichos: First Night (1992). They have also produced a host of titles of which Scherman is author and Zlotowitz is editor. Newly released publications list Scherman first, followed by Gedaliah Zlotowitz as general editors.

Zlotowitz is the author of:

- Esther: The Megillah: A new translation with a commentary anthologized from Talmudic, Midrashic, and rabbinic sources, 1976
- Eichah (Lamentations): A new translation with a commentary anthologized from Talmudic, Midrashic, and rabbinic sources, 1976
- Koheles (Ecclesiastes): A new translation with a commentary anthologized from Talmudic, Midrashic, and rabbinic sources, 1976
- Ruth: A new translation with a commentary anthologized from Talmudic, Midrashic, and rabbinic sources, 1976
- Shir HaShirim (Song of Songs): A new translation with a commentary anthologized from Talmudic, Midrashic, and rabbinic sources, 1976
- Yonah (Jonah): A new translation with a commentary anthologized from Talmudic, Midrashic and Rabbinic sources, 1978
- Chanukah: Its history, observance and significance (co-author: Rabbi Hersh Goldwurm), 1981
- Succos: Its significance, laws and prayers: A presentation anthologized from Talmudic and Midrashic sources, 1982
- Shema Yisrael: A new translation with a commentary anthologized from Talmudic, Midrashic, and rabbinic sources, 1982
- Pirkei Avos, 1984
- Bereishis: A new translation with a commentary anthologized from Talmudic, Midrashic, and rabbinic sources (2-volume set), 1986

A biography, authored by Rabbi Yisroel Besser (Montreal), was written by the time of the first Yartzeit.

== Gedaliah Zlotowitz ==
Rabbi Gedaliah Zlotowitz is Rabbi Meir's oldest son and successor.

Arscroll's Titles by Rabbi Gedaliah Zlotowitz had nine entries as of August 2024.
