= Yaakov Yitzchak Horowitz =

Yaakov Yitzchak Horowitz may refer to:

- Yaakov Yitzchak of Lublin (c. 1745 – 1815), Polish rabbi known as the "Seer of Lublin"
- Yaakov Yitzchak Horowitz (American rabbi) (born 1956), American rabbi associated with the Manischewitz kosher food company

== See also ==
- Yakov Horowitz, Orthodox rabbi, author and educator from New York
