= Nisson Wolpin =

American rabbi and editor (1932–2017)

Rabbi Nisson Wolpin

Nisson Wolpin was an Orthodox rabbi and (1932-2017), renowned for being the editor of The Jewish Observer. He also served as the learning director of Camp Munk for many summers.

== Early life ==
Rabbi Wolpin was born in 1932 in Seattle, Washington to Bentzion and Kaila Wolpin. His parents, immigrants from Europe, lost 13 of their 15 children to childhood diseases prior to their coming to the United States.

During his formative years, Seattle didn't have any fit Jewish schools for him to attend, and he therefore had no other option other than attending a local public school. Like his three brothers, he attended a Talmud Torah in the afternoon. At age 15 he was sent to Yeshiva Torah Vodaath.

Wolpin was one of "a small cadre of talmidim" selected by Gedaliah Schorr to be students at a Los Angeles-based yeshiva founded in 1952 by Simcha Wasserman.

== Career ==
During his adult years as a married man, Rabbi Wolpin served as a rebbi (teacher of Torah) at Yeshiva Ohr Yisrael in Queens, an elementary yeshiva for Orthodox Jewish boys. In 1970, he was offered the position of editor of The Jewish Observer, a newspaper published by Agudath Israel of America. Before accepting the position, he approached Rabbi Yaakov Kamenetzky, who told him: "Until now you were a mechanech (educator) of children. From now on you will be a mechanech for adults." For several years he had a role in Olomeinu, the children's periodical, as well.

== Later life ==
In 2010, Rabbi Wolpin and his wife moved to Israel, where he learned in a kollel.

On April 24, 2017, he died in Jerusalem, survived by his wife, their children, grandchildren, and great-grandchildren. One obituary referred to him as "father of the flourishing chareidi press in the English language today."
