= Yakov Horowitz =

American Orthodox rabbi

- Born: 1959 (age 66–67)
- Education: Mesivta Torah Vodaath
- Known for: At-risks teen and child safety advocacy
- Website: http://www.rabbihorowitz.com

Rabbi Yakov Horowitz is an Orthodox rabbi, author, educator and advocate from Monsey, New York.

== Early life ==
Horowitz was born to Shloime and Beile Horowitz. His father died when he was three years old. He was raised in a Haredi family in Belle Harbor, New York. He studied in yeshivas including Mesivta Torah Vodaath. He developed a closed relationship with Rabbi Avraham Yaakov Pam.

== Career ==
In 1982, Horowitz began teaching eighth grade boys in Borough Park, Brooklyn and later in Monsey, New York.

In 1996, based on his experience as a teacher, he wrote a 4,500 word essay in The Jewish Observer titled “An Ounce of Prevention” on the subject of at-risk teens in the community. The article shocked the Orthodox community and led to an invitation to address the 1996 National Conventions of Agudath Israel of America and Torah Umesorah. It also led to the founding of Project Y.E.S. in 1997, which he is the director of.

In 1997, Horowitz founded a yeshiva, Yeshiva Darchei Noam, for teens. He worked with teens at risk for over 30 years.

In the 1990s, Horowitz was a Fellow at the Mandel Institute's Senior Leadership Program.

Horowitz is a member of the Curriculum Advisory Committee of The Institute for Day School Management of the UJA-Federation of New York.

Horowitz was a regular columnist for The Jewish Press and Mispacha on topics including mental health, social problems, internet usage and child safety.

Horowitz co-published a children's book to educate children about sexual safety called "Let's Stay Safe", written by prolific children's author, Bracha Goetz, and co-published by Artscroll that sold over 120,000 copies. The book has been translated into Hebrew and Yiddish and has sold thousands in those languages.

Horowitz uses social media to warn about sex offenders within the Jewish community and how to avoid them. Horowitz was sued for defamation in Israel by a convicted sex offender for warning on social media of the danger the offender poses to children, likening it to a terrorist with a machete. The charge was ultimately rejected by a Jerusalem judge.

== Awards ==
- Rockland Educator of the Year Award (2002)
- Grinspoon-Steinhardt Award for Excellence in Jewish Education (2005)
- Covenant Award for Exceptional Jewish Educators (2008)
