= Elias Schwartz =

Rabbi Elias (Eli) Schwartz (died November 23, 2016) was an American synagogue rabbi, a yeshiva principal, and an author.

== Education ==
He was a student at Yeshiva Torah Vodaath, where his primary influences were Rabbis Shlomo Heiman and Shraga Feivel Mendlowitz

== Career ==
His students and past congregants numbered in the thousands

The two volumes that he authored using the title V'Shee-non-tom (And thou shalt teach them) were to extend the work he did in helping to found Olomeinu Magazine.

His synagogue, Young Israel of Bensonhurst, was in a neighborhood that changed several times since he accepted its pulpit "in the early 1960s."

Similarly, the backgrounds of his students at Yeshiva Toras Emes Kaminetz changed from "the 1940s..." when "Rabbi Schwartz assumed leadership of Torah Emes."

Schwartz also oversaw the relocation of the school's three buildings twice:

- first, from a pair of buildings housing the elementary grades, on 43rd street between 13th and 14th Avenue, and a separate building blocks away housing the high school, all in the lower end of Boro Park, to a single building a mile away
- then, years later, to the Midwood section of Flatbush.

The growing presence of Jewish immigrants from the former Soviet Union within Brooklyn added to both his congregation and the yeshiva, and he helped with "the many challenges they faced."

== Works ==
- V'shee-non-tom, Volume I, For each and every sedra
- V'shee-non-tom, Volume II, Pesach, Shevuos, Succohs
- Delving Within by Rabbi Elias Schwartz

In Volume I of V'Shee-non-tom, Schwartz describes his work on this volume as an outgrowth of his work on Olameinu Magazine.

First came the weekly mimeograph sheets, sent home to parents of the Yeshiva where he was principal. This came to the attention of NCSY's Rabbi Pinchas Stolper; the material was printed by UOJCA, the parent body, for use by NCSY group leaders.

== Death ==
Upon his November 23, 2016 (22 Mar-Cheshvan) passing, he was survived by a son (Rabbi Dr. Yehuda Schwartz), a daughter (Mrs. Hoschander), and 2 more generations of descendants.
