= Yeshiva Toras Emes Kaminetz =

Yeshiva in Brooklyn

Coordinates: 40.615792°N 73.955532°W

Location
- 1904 Avenue N Brooklyn, New York 11230; United States

Yeshiva Toras Emes Kamenitz is a private, Orthodox Jewish boys school located at 1904 Avenue N in the Midwood section of Flatbush.

== History ==
The school began as a pair of buildings housing the elementary grades, on 43rd street between 13th and 14th Avenue, and a separate building blocks away housing the high school, all in the lower end of Boro Park.

Decades later, the 3 buildings were consolidated into a single building, a mile away.

In the year 2000, the school relocated to its present location at 1904 Avenue N, Brooklyn, NY 11230.

=== Student population ===
The backgrounds of students changed from "the 1940s..." when "Rabbi Schwartz assumed leadership of Torah Emes." The growing presence of Jewish immigrants from the former Soviet Union within Brooklyn added to the yeshiva, and he helped with "the many challenges they faced."

== High school ==
The high school's historical Kamenitz name has been augmented to include the name Joseph S. Gruss.

== Elementary school ==
References to the elementary school use Yeshiva Toras Emes. Rabbi Elias Schwartz served "over 50 years" as the dean/Hebrew principal of the yeshiva, beginning in its early (Boro Park) years.
