= Irving I. Stone =

American philanthropist and businessman

Irving I. Stone (1909 in Cleveland – January 19, 2000) was an American philanthropist, businessman, and founder-chairman of American Greetings.

He was born to Jacob Sapirstein; the stein ending, Yiddish pronunciation: "SHtein", means "stone".

== Career ==
Stone turned a small family business, Sapirstein Greeting Card Company, into "the world's second-largest maker of greeting cards.".

In the 1930s, rather than merely sell what others had designed, he began what is now the American Greetings Creative Department, which the New York Times described as "one of the biggest art studios in the United States."

He authored the company's "From Someone Who Likes to Remember Someone Too Nice to Forget" card, using skills he developed and improved by taking courses at night.

The company he built has over 20,000 employees, and competes with Hallmark.

== Philanthropy ==
Among the causes supported by Stone were Yeshiva University, Hebrew Academy of Cleveland, and the Chinuch Atzmai Torah schools in Israel. The Stones supported projects under the guidance of Rabbi Nachum Zev Dessler, in Cleveland. Irving I. Stone was also the main benefactor to Camp Stone, a Zionist summer camp in Sugar Grove, Pennsylvania. The Stone in Manhattan was named after him, as he was a frequent concert goer.

The Jerusalem suburb of Kiryat Yearim, also known as Telz-Stone, was named in his honor.

=== Stone Chumash ===
His name is the source for the Stone Chumash's name.
