= Camp Stone =

Jewish summer camp in Pennsylvania, US

Coordinates: 41.982589°N 79.338619°W

- Formation: 1969
- Founder: Irving I. Stone
- Purpose: Jewish summer camp
- Location: Sugar Grove, Pennsylvania
- Official language: English and Hebrew
- Directors: Yakov and Estee Fleischmann
- Parent organization: Bnei Akiva
- Website: www.campstone.org

Camp Stone is a Jewish summer camp located in Sugar Grove, Pennsylvania. It is affiliated with Bnei Akiva, a Religious Zionist youth movement. The camp encourages aliyah, or emigration to Israel.

== History ==
The camp began operations in 1969, and is named after its founder, the Jewish philanthropist, Irving I. Stone, a longtime executive at American Greetings. Stone purchased the 400-acre site of a former camp to establish an Orthodox Jewish summer camp.

== Programs ==
Programs for campers include study of Jewish history, Torah study and prayer. Other programs include an introduction to farming, glass blowing and blacksmithing. Traditional camp activities like swimming, horseback riding, archery, Color War, drama, rock skipping, 9 Square, sports such as basketball, football, soccer, ultimate frisbee, and other activities are also offered, as well as a ropes course and a zip line. The camp also features a reproduction of a German cattle car, like those used to transport Jews to Nazi concentration camps, and used for Holocaust education. According to previous camp director Yehuda Rothner, the lesson taught is that "senseless hatred leads into the abyss".
