= Dov Shurin =

American-Israeli singer-songwriter (born 1949)

Dov Shurin דב שורין
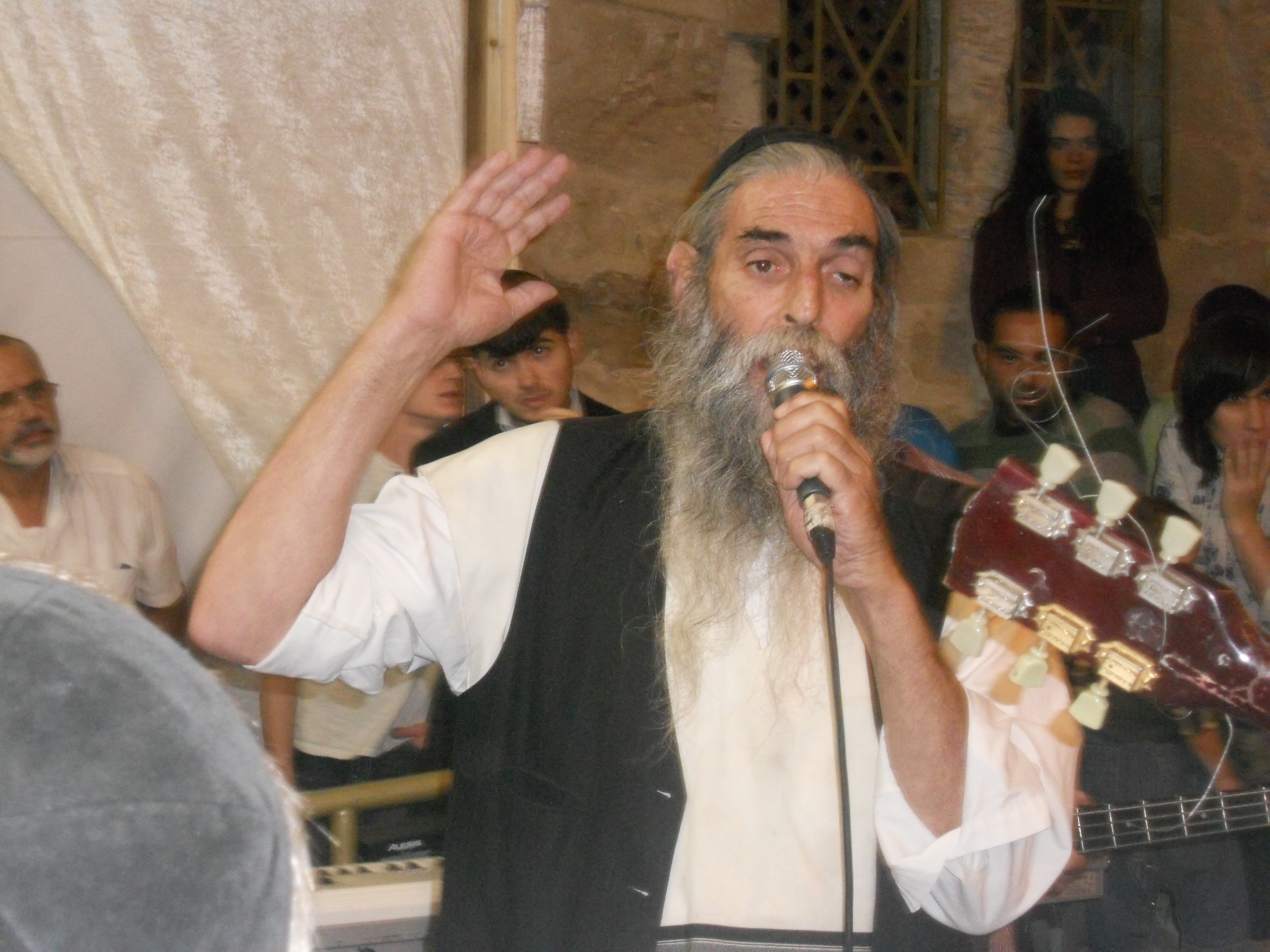
- At David's Tomb in 2010

Background information
- Born: 1949 (age 76–77); Brooklyn, New York City, U.S.
- Genre: Jewish
- Instrument: Guitar

Dov Shurin (Hebrew: דב שורין; born 1949) is an American-Israeli singer-songwriter. He is known for his far-right political views related to the Land of Israel and the settlement of occupied territories in the region, which he conveys both through his music and media appearances.

== Biography ==
Shurin is an Orthodox Jew, and a grandson of Yaakov Kamenetsky. He moved to Israel from Brooklyn, New York in 1984. As of 2008, he lived in downtown Jerusalem's historic Sansur Building.

== Musical style ==
Shurin's music ranges from soft folk ballads to fast-paced, electric guitar danceable music. His lyrics range from original to biblical sources—or a mashup of the two. One of his major hits was "Zochreini Na", a song based upon the prayer of Samson. The song's lyrics echo the Old Testament judge when he asked God to restore his strength so he could exact his revenge upon Philistines who had captured and blinded him (Book of Judges 16:28), except with "Palestine" replacing the word "Philistines". The song was initially popular mainly on Israeli settlements before gradually spreading to non-settler circles, where the lyrics were restored to the original wording of the Biblical verse. An Israeli wedding in 2015 celebrated the Duma arson attack while playing the song, and it was also chanted during the 2021 Jerusalem clashes.

Shurin is noted for his Kahanist political views. The struggle for the Land of Israel is a recurring theme in his music.

== Media appearances ==
Shurin was featured on the cover of The Economist with a Bible in one hand and an Uzi in the other.

Shurin has been featured in documentaries and briefly became a pop star within the settler movement with songs calling for violence against the Palestinians and resistance to Israel's 2005 withdrawal from the Gaza Strip.

Shurin featured in Settlers, a documentary made in 2002 by British director Sean McAllister. In the film Shurin states that although he believes that the Land of Israel belongs solely to the Jewish people, he has no problem being friendly with individual Arabs. A scene shows Shurin interceding on behalf of an elderly Arab man who was stopped at the Western Wall Plaza by Israeli security; Shurin stated that he is proud of what he did and that this deed was a mitzvah.

== Discography ==
- I See the Sunrise (1980, rereleased as Kol Dodi: Voice of my Love)
- Chakal Tapuchim: The field of Sacred Apples (1984), with "Uncle" Dovid Lybush Halpern
- You Are With Me (1985, released 2000) with Shlomo Carlebach
- Madly in Love With The One Above (1999)
- Biblical Revenge "The Nekama Album" (2002)
- Purim XTC (2002)
- Zion Square Band in Jerusalem Live (2004)
- Masters of the Land "The Nechama Album" (2004)
- Shuvi El Irayich (2009)
- Charming Nation (2011)
