= Making of a Godol =

Making of a Godol: A Study of Episodes in the Lives of Great Torah Personalities
- Author: Noson (Nathan) Kamenetsky
- Publisher: Distributors, Hamesorah Publishers
- Publication date: 2002; 2nd ed. 2005
- Publication place: Israel
- Pages: 2 v. (1398 pp); 2nd ed. (1429 pp)
- ISBN: 965-90379-0-2
- LC Class: BM750 .K292 2002

Making of a Godol: A Study of Episodes in the Lives of Great Torah Personalities is a two-volume book written and published in 2002, with an improved edition published in 2005, by Rabbi Nathan Kamenetsky (1930-2019), son of Rabbi Yaakov Kamenetsky, about the life of his father and of various other Jewish sages of the 19th and 20th centuries, who are revered by Orthodox (especially Haredi) Jews. The word Godol means "great [one]" in Hebrew, and refers to exceptional Talmudic scholars who are often prominent Roshei Yeshiva (heads of yeshivas).

The book, which resulted from about 15 years of extensive research, includes much historical background based on over 800 sources, and is very detailed in its stories and biographies. Due to the banning of both editions (see next section), not more than 1,000 sets of each edition are in existence.

== Bans against both editions ==
Soon after it was first published, a group of 10 leading Haredi rabbis in Israel, first among them Rabbi Yosef Shalom Eliashiv, appeared to issue an official letter banning the book, claiming that it was disrespectful to the rabbis whose lives it describes. For example, the book records that Rabbi Aharon Kotler read Russian books in his youth. The book also claims that as a young man studying in yeshiva, Kotler was a "sore loser" at chess and he would always demand from his opponent to be able to take back moves once he realized that they were a mistake. This is said to have prompted a grandson of Kotler to urge Eliashiv to ban the book. Kamenetsky responded that he did not consider such information to be disparaging. (Indeed, he wrote that his father also had read Russian books.) Rather, he was merely recounting a nisayon (personal test or trial) that these great men experienced in the process of becoming Gedolim (great sages) during the difficult period of Haskalah.

The author stated, however, that Eliashiv had agreed to defer publicizing the letter until he had the opportunity to speak with the author in person (Kamenetsky was in the United States at the time for medical purposes). This agreement was thwarted when "zealots" publicized the letter prematurely without permission, an action that caused Eliashiv to be "furious." Although the ban was still not official, it was very difficult to subdue the message of Eliashiv's letter, countersigned by nine other sages, which now lined the walls of the religious neighborhoods of Jerusalem. Despite further negotiations, through which the author was almost able to prevent the ban from taking effect (or have it withdrawn), Kamenetsky states that "zealots" falsely accused him of breaking his promise to temporarily stop selling books, which led to the ban becoming official. The ban was highly controversial in the Orthodox Jewish world. Kamenetsky has noted that none of the 10 Israeli signatories of the ban personally read Making of a Godol and, indeed, all but one (Rabbi Chaim Pinchas Scheinberg) are unable to read English. Although he did not agree with the ban, and believed that the signatories of the ban were misled by "zealots," Kamenetsky abided by it, primarily out of his reverence for Eliashiv. However, Kamenetsky lamented that had Rabbi Shlomo Zalman Auerbach or Rabbi Elazar Shach been living he is certain that the ban would have never been issued, as these sages would have insisted on hearing his side of the story first.

Kamenetsky stated that, in writing the book, he "naively believed that everyone would appreciate getting a true, human glimpse [of] our spiritual leaders," and that this honest portrayal "is what bothered the zealots." Kamenetsky argued that he has more respect for Torah sages than do the "zealots," in that they believe that it is an embarrassment to reveal the truth about the Gedolim, whereas he believes that there is no need to hide anything, because knowing the truth about the Gedolim only increases one's respect for them (due to their vast accomplishments, despite facing life's trials and being human).

The author addressed the ban in his 2003 book Anatomy of a Ban, which is currently unavailable to the public. Shortly after releasing the second edition of Making of a Godol, Kamenetsky discussed the ban of the first edition, and expressed hope that the second edition would not meet the same fate. Nevertheless, a new letter was issued in March 2006, with the rabbis who issued it, first among them Eliashiv, declaring that the second edition was reviewed by Rabbis Dan Segal and Yosef Rosenblum, and that the original ban remained in force for the second edition.

The second ban was reportedly in violation of an agreement between Kamenetsky and Eliashiv, that the second edition would not be banned without Kamenetsky first being given an opportunity to defend the work. Indeed, Kamenetsky reports that, before the second ban was issued, he sent letters to most of the signatories of the first ban, informing them of this agreement with Eliashiv.

Rabbi Moshe Shmuel Shapiro, a signatory to the first ban, did not participate in the second ban, having apologized to Kamenetsky, and given his word that he would have nothing more to do with the matter.

== Torah sages who support the book ==
Kamenetsky reports that both Rabbi Zelik Epstein, who was a senior Rosh Yeshiva in America, and Rabbi Moshe Sternbuch, a prominent Halachic authority in Israel, read Making of a Godol and fully approved of it. He quoted Epstein as stating in a letter to Eliashiv that "in my opinion there is no justification whatsoever to ban the aforementioned book." Kamenetsky stated that Sternbuch rules for anyone who asks him that the book is "Kosher." He quoted Sternbuch as exclaiming within earshot of at least 50 people one Shabbos morning after services: "Reb Noson, you keep [on] writing - no one can do as good a job as you!"

== Publication details ==
- Kamenetsky, Noson (Nathan) (2002). Making of a Godol: A Study of Episodes in the Lives of Great Torah Personalities. Jerusalem: Distributors, Hamesorah Publishers. ISBN 965-90379-0-2.
- Kamenetsky, Noson (Nathan) (2005). Making of a Godol - Improved Edition (2nd ed.). Jerusalem: P. P. Publishers. ISBN 965-90379-0-2.
