= Shuckling =

Ritual swaying during Jewish prayer

A Jewish man (top right) shuckling at the Wailing Wall.

Shuckling (also written as shokeling), from the Yiddish word meaning "to shake" (שאָקלען, shoklen), is the ritual swaying of worshippers during Jewish prayer, usually forward and back but also from side to side.

== History ==
This practice can be traced back to at latest the 8th century, and possibly as far back as Talmudic times. It was said of Rabbi Akiva that when he prayed by himself he would start in one corner and end up in another, because of all his kneeling and bowing; this link was noted by Maharil (14th century). The practice was mentioned by Yehuda Halevi in the 12th century. By the 13th century, Jews in Europe were “known for their shokeling during prayer.” However, the practice was opposed by some Halakhic authorities, especially during the recitation of the Amidah, as well as by 19th-century Jewish religious reformers. Jiří Langer gives a description of shokeling among Belz Chassidim in early 20th century Europe.

== Interpretations ==
Simon Brainin stated that the practice was historically done "to afford the body exercise during study and prayer, which took up a large portion of the time of a great number of Jews".

Yehuda Halevi (12th century) wrote that the habit began when there was a shortage of books. This forced people to surround a single codex laid on the ground, each one bending in turn to read a passage.

Moshe Isserles (16th century) mentioned a custom to sway during Torah study to recall the giving of the Torah in which the people trembled, and to sway during prayer to recall Psalms 35:10 which speaks of "all of one's bones" praising God.

Shuckling is believed to increase concentration and emotional intensity. In Chassidic lore, it is seen as an expression of the soul's desire to abandon the body and reunite itself with its source, similar to a flame's shaking back and forth as if to free itself from the wick.

The Baal Shem Tov, the 17th century founder of Hasidic Judaism, notes in his ethical testament, Tzavaat HaRivash, that the swaying in prayer is similar and connected to the act of copulation. He writes, "prayer is zivug (coupling) with the Shechinah. Just as there is motion at the beginning of coupling, so, too, one must move (sway) at the beginning of prayer. Thereafter one can stand still, without motion, attached to the Shechinah with great deveikut."
