= The Jewish Observer =

American Orthodox Jewish magazine

- Former editors: Nachman Bulman; Nisson Wolpin
- Frequency: Monthly
- Publisher: Agudath Israel of America
- Founder: Moshe Sherer
- First issue: September 1963; 62 years ago
- Final issue Number: 2009; Vol 41 No 9
- Country: United States
- Based in: New York City, United States
- Language: English
- ISSN: 0021-6615

The Jewish Observer (JO) was an American Orthodox Jewish monthly magazine published by Agudath Israel of America, from 1963 until 2009.

The magazine was founded by Moshe Sherer, and the first issue was released in September 1963. Ernst L. Bodenheimer served as chairman of the editorial board, and was replaced by Joseph Elias after his death. The editor for the first seven seasons was Nachman Bulman, later Yaakov Jacobs, and from 1970 until it ended publication was Nisson Wolpin.

It was printed nine months a year; the January and February issues were combined, and there were no issues in July or August. The magazine discussed current topics through a Haredi viewpoint.

Contributors to the Jewish Observer included Avi Shafran, Zalman I. Posner, Mendel Weinbach, Nosson Scherman, Aaron Twerski, Aryeh Kaplan, Jonathan Rosenblum, Bernard Fryshman, Yitzchok Adlerstein, Yakov Horowitz and Yitzchok Lowenbraun.
