= Yaakov Kamenetsky =

20th century American rabbi

Rabbi Yaakov Kamenetsky

Personal life
- Born: February 28, 1891 Kalushkove, Lithuania
- Died: March 10, 1986 (aged 95) Baltimore, Maryland, U.S.
- Buried: Mount Judah Cemetery, Queens, New York; March 10, 1986

Religious life
- Religion: Judaism

Yaakov Kamenetsky (February 28, 1891 – March 10, 1986), was a prominent rabbi, rosh yeshiva, posek and Talmudist in the post-World War II American Jewish community.

== Biography ==
Kamenetsky was born at a folwark (farming estate) called Kalyskovka owned by his grandfather Samuel-Hirsh Kamenetsky, Russia, in 1891.

Kamenetsky became rabbi of Tytuvėnai in 1926 and moved to North America in 1937, where he initially took rabbinical positions in Seattle and then (from 1938 to 1945) Toronto. From 1948 to 1968 he headed Mesivta Torah Vodaath in Brooklyn, New York City. After leaving the yeshiva he moved to Monsey, New York, where he focused on publishing his books.

He was an expert in Hebrew grammar and an advocate for English-language Jewish religious books and said that "today English has become a language of Torah."

== Family ==
Kamenetsky's first wife was Itta Ettil (Heller) Kamenetsky, who died on July 9, 1954. In 1958, Kamenetsky married Chana Urman of Toronto. The officiator at Kamenetsky's marriage to Chana was his close friend and colleague, Rabbi Zelik Epstein. Chana died shortly after her husband in 1986.

Kamenetsky's son, Rabbi Shmuel Kamenetsky, heads the Talmudical Yeshiva of Philadelphia and chairs the Moetzes Gedolei HaTorah. His other sons are: Rabbis Binyamin (1923–2017), founder of the Yeshiva of South Shore in Long Island, NY, Nathan (1930-2019), vice Rosh yeshiva at Yeshivas Itri, and author of Making of a Godol on his father, and Avraham (1930–2013). His oldest daughter, Malka (1921–2013), was married to Rabbi Yisrael Shurin (d. 2007). A second daughter, Rivka, was married to Rabbi Hirsch Diskind (1922–2013), the long-time Dean of Bais Yaakov of Baltimore.

His grandson Dov Shurin is a singer-songwriter.

== Legacy ==
He was the subject of the 1993 biography Reb Yaakov: The Life and Times of HaGaon Rabbi Yaakov Kamenetsky, written by Yonasan Rosenblum and first published by Artscroll-Mesorah. Rabbi Aharon Feldman in The Jewish Observer called Reb Yaakov a "remarkable book which genuinely evokes the spirit of Reb Yaakov".

== Works ==
- Emes leYaakov al HaShas ("Truth to Jacob") – a five-volume work with in depth commentary on the Talmud.
- Emes leYaakov al Shulchan Aruch – a volume with commentary and rulings on Shulchan Aruch, The Jewish Code of Law
- Emes leYaakov (Formerly known as Iyunim BaMikra) – a two volume commentary on Torah and Prophets, which includes grammatical observations on the Hebrew of the Bible (dikduk).
