= ArtScroll =

Translations, books and commentaries from an Orthodox Jewish perspective

- Parent company: Mesorah Publications
- Status: Active
- Founded: 1976
- Country of origin: United States
- Headquarters location: Rahway, New Jersey
- Key people: Nosson Scherman (General editor); Gedaliah Zlotowitz (General editor)
- Official website: www.artscroll.com

ArtScroll is an imprint of translations, books and commentaries from an Orthodox Jewish perspective published by Mesorah Publications, Ltd., a publishing company based in Rahway, New Jersey. Rabbi Nosson Scherman is the general editor.

ArtScroll's first president, Rabbi Meir Zlotowitz (July 13, 1943 – June 24, 2017) was succeeded by his oldest son, Rabbi Gedaliah Zlotowitz, whose name is listed secondarily in new publications as general editor, after that of Rabbi Scherman.

== History ==
In 1975, Rabbi Meir Zlotowitz, a graduate of Mesivtha Tifereth Jerusalem, was director of a high-end graphics studio in New York. The firm, ArtScroll Studios, produced ketubot, brochures, invitations, and awards. Rabbi Nosson Scherman, then principal of Yeshiva Karlin Stolin Boro Park, was approached by Zlotowitz who had helped him write copy for brochures and journals in the past, and they collaborated on a few projects.

In late 1975, Zlotowitz wrote an English translation and commentary on the Book of Esther in memory of a friend, and asked Scherman to write the introduction. The book sold out its first edition of 20,000 copies within two months. With the encouragement of Rabbis Yaakov Yitzchok Ruderman, Mordechai Gifter, Moses Feinstein, Yaakov Kamenetsky, and others, the two continued producing commentaries, beginning with a translation and commentary on the rest of the Five Megillot (Song of Songs, Ecclesiastes, Lamentations and Ruth), and went on to publish translations and commentaries on the Torah, Prophets, Talmud, Passover Haggadah, siddurs and machzors. By 1990, ArtScroll had produced more than 700 books, including novels, history books, children's books and secular textbooks, and became the largest publisher of Jewish books in the United States.

After decades of being headquartered in New York, ArtScroll moved to New Jersey in 2020. Among other things, ArtScroll's headquarters in Rahway is notable for their in-house green screen studio used for the production of Inside ArtScroll videos made available online, as well as non-ArtScroll videos such as Mishpacha interviews and other "films that are broadcasted to the Torah community."

=== Associated entities ===
The Mesorah Heritage Foundation box printed on the inner page of ArtScroll publications lists Rabbi David Feinstein's name first.

Mesorah Publications is the "parent" company of ArtScroll; the name Mesorah was not part of ArtScroll's publications for the first book published, Megilas Esther (1976).

== Publications ==
=== Primary publications and popular demand ===
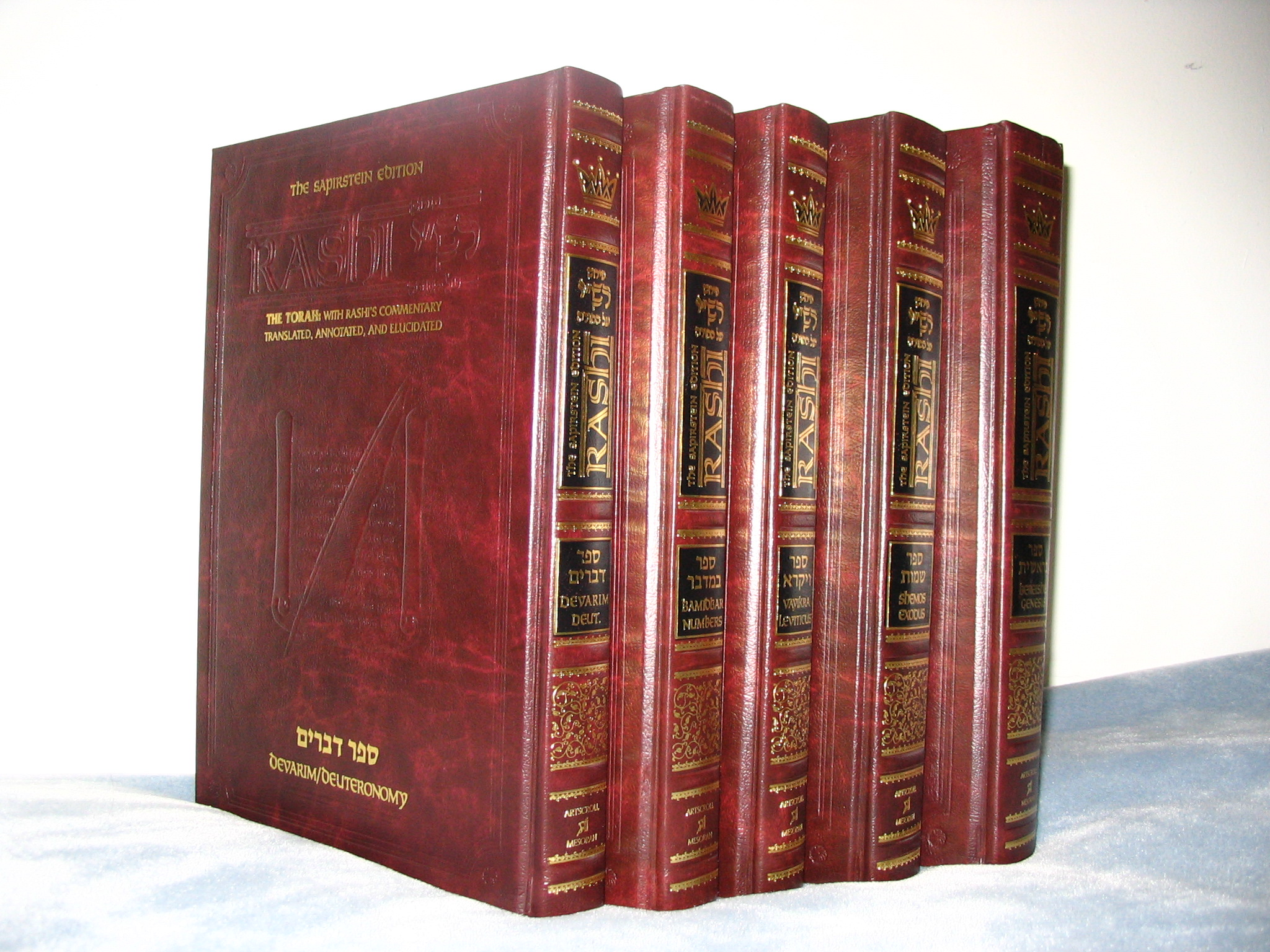
The Sapirstein Edition Rashi.

ArtScroll publishes books on a variety of Jewish subjects. The best known is probably an annotated Hebrew-English siddur ("prayerbook") (The ArtScroll Siddur).

Its Torah translation and commentary, a series of translations and commentaries on books of the Tanach (Hebrew Bible), and an English translation and elucidation of the Babylonian Talmud have enjoyed great success. Other publications include works on Jewish Law, novels and factual works based on Jewish life or history, and cookbooks.

The popular demand for ArtScroll's translations of classic Jewish works (e.g., Mishnah; Talmud) largely coincided with preexisting market demands, unappreciated to an extent, for English editions characterized by both high-fidelity translations as well as accompanying commentary in the English vernacular. Such editions are used even by American yeshivah graduates–who have had the benefit of exposure to Hebrew and Aramaic from a young age–inasmuch as it is often easier to effortlessly parse through the material in their native language in place of what may at times be a tedious endeavor of self-translation. In certain cases, reading the Judaic texts in one's native English can even "trigger a new depth of thought that comes from the subtleties of a finer understanding."

ArtScroll publications are best identified through the "hallmark features" of its design elements such as typeface and layout, through which "ArtScroll books constitute a field of visual interaction that enables and encourages the reader to navigate the text in particular ways." The emphasis on design and layout can be understood "as a strategy on the part of the publisher to achieve a range of cognitive as well as esthetic effects." The name ArtScroll was chosen for the publishing company to emphasize the visual appeal of the books.

=== Prayerbooks ===
Mesorah Publications received widespread acclaim in response to its ArtScroll line of prayerbooks, starting with The Complete ArtScroll Siddur, Ed. Nosson Scherman, 1984. This work gained wide acceptance in the Orthodox Jewish community, and within a few years became a popular Hebrew-English siddur (prayerbook) in the United States. It offered the reader detailed notes and instructions on most of the prayers and versions of this prayerbook were produced for the High Holidays, and the three pilgrimage festivals Passover, Sukkot and Shavuot.

They are also well-known for their range of interlinear translated prayerbooks and machzorim, of which the design has been patent protected.

While many Conservative synagogues rely on the Siddur Sim Shalom or Or Hadash prayer books and Etz Hayim Humash, "a small but growing number of North American Conservative Jewish congregations ... have recently adopted ArtScroll prayer books and Bibles as their 'official' liturgical texts, not to mention a much larger number of Conservative synagogues that over recent years have grown accustomed to individual congregants participating in prayer services with editions of ArtScroll prayer books in their hands." The shift has mainly occurred among more traditionally minded Conservative congregants and rabbis (sometimes labeled "Conservadox") "as an adequate representation of the more traditional liturgy they seek to embrace."

Since the advent of ArtScroll, a number of Jewish publishers have printed books and siddurim with similar typefaces and commentary, but with a different commentary and translation philosophy.

=== Stone Chumash ===
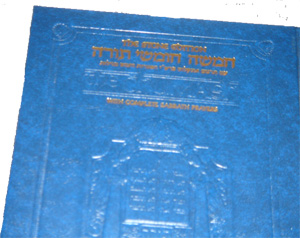
ArtScroll Stone Chumash, cover

In 1993, Mesorah Publications published The Chumash: The Stone Edition, a translation and commentary on the Chumash arranged for liturgical use and sponsored by Irving I. Stone of American Greetings, Cleveland, Ohio. It has since become a widely available English-Hebrew Torah translation and commentary in the U.S. and other English-speaking countries.

A 2018 review of Hebrew-English Chumashim said that ArtScroll's Stone Edition Chumash, often called The Stone Chumash, is "the most successful Orthodox replacement for the" Hertz Chumash.

== Schottenstein Edition Talmud ==
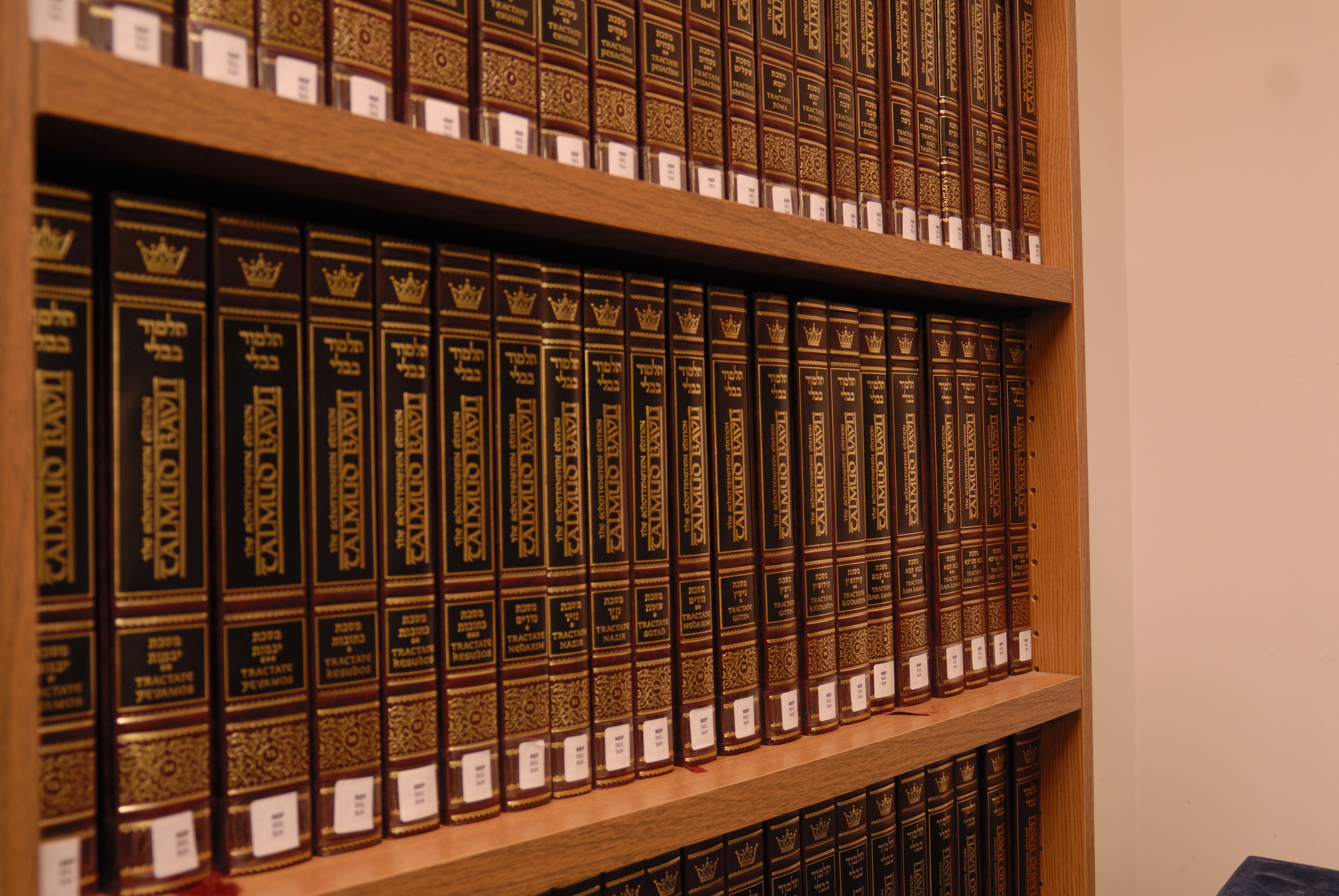
Artscroll Talmud in a synagogue library

Mesorah has a line of Mishnah translations and commentaries, and a line of Babylonian Talmud translations and commentaries, The Schottenstein Edition of The Talmud Bavli ("Babylonian Talmud"). The set of Talmud was completed in late 2004, giving a 73 volume English edition of the entire Talmud. This was the second complete translation of the Talmud into English (the other being the Soncino Talmud published in the United Kingdom during the mid-twentieth century). The first volume, Tractate Makkos, was published in 1990, and dedicated by Mr. and Mrs. Marcos Katz. Jerome Schottenstein was introduced by Rabbi Dr. Norman Lamm to the publication committee shortly thereafter. He began by donating funds for the project in memory of his parents Ephraim and Anna Schottenstein one volume at a time, and later decided to back the entire project. When Jerome died, his children and widow, Geraldine, rededicated the project to his memory in addition to those of his parents. The goal of the project was to, "open the doors of the Talmud and welcome its people inside."

The text generally consists of two side-by-side pages: one of the Aramaic/Hebrew Vilna Edition text, and the corresponding page consists of an English translation. The English translation has a bolded literal translation of the Talmud's text, but also includes un-bolded text clarifying the literal translation. (The original Talmud's text is often very unclear, referring to places, times, people, and laws that it does not explain. The un-bolded text attempts to explain these situations. The text of the Talmud also contains few prepositions, articles, etc. The un-bolded text takes the liberty of inserting these parts of speech.) The result is an English text that reads in full sentences with full explanations, while allowing the reader to distinguish between direct translation and a more liberal approach to the translation. (This also results in one page of the Vilna Talmud requiring several pages of English translation.) Below the English translation appear extensive notes including diagrams.

ArtScroll's English explanations and footnoted commentary in the Schottenstein Edition of the Talmud are based on the perspective of classical Jewish sources. The clarifying explanation is generally based on the viewpoint of Rashi, the medieval commentator who wrote the first comprehensive commentary on the Talmud. The Schottenstein Edition does not include contemporary academic or critical scholarship. The overall guidelines follow a pattern defined by Rabbi Hersh Goldwurm, "a Monsey, N.Y., scholar who died in 1993." The total cost of the project is estimated at US$21 million, most of which was contributed by private donors and foundations. Some volumes have up to 2 million copies in distribution, while more recent volumes have only 90,000 copies currently printed. A completed set was dedicated on February 9, 2005, to the Library of Congress, and the siyum (celebration at the "completion") was held on March 15, 2005, the 13th yahrzeit of Jerome Schottenstein, at the New York Hilton. The blue-covered Hebrew Talmud set, which like the English counterpart is 73 volumes, has a HasKaMa (approbation) from a Bobover Rebbe, Grand Rabbi Naftali Halberstam. A French language set was begun.

Mesorah and the Schottenstein family have also printed a Hebrew version of the commentary and have begun both an English and Hebrew translation of the Talmud Yerushalmi (Jerusalem Talmud - the Hebrew/Aramaic side of the page, as well as the pagination, is based on the Oz Vehadar edition), Midrash Rabbah and other classical sources.

ArtScroll has also produced the "Elucidated Mishnah", a work similarly clarifying the Mishnah-text, and expanding thereon in an appended commentary and footnotes; see Mishnah § Commentaries.

== Kosher by Design ==
In 2003, ArtScroll published a cookbook by Susie Fishbein entitled Kosher by Design: Picture-perfect food for the holidays & every day. The cookbook contains both traditional recipes and updated versions of traditional recipes. All the recipes are kosher and the book puts an emphasis on its food photography. Since publication, the book has sold over 400,000 copies from 2003 through 2010, and Fishbein has become a media personality, earning the sobriquets of "the Jewish Martha Stewart" and the "kosher diva". ArtScroll has realized the books' salability by extending beyond its traditional Orthodox Jewish market into the mainstream market, including sales on Amazon, at Barnes & Noble and Christian evangelical booksellers, in Williams Sonoma stores, and in supermarkets.

== Editorial policy ==
Works published by Mesorah under this imprint adhere to a perspective appealing to many Orthodox Jews, but especially to Orthodox Jews who have come from less religious backgrounds, but are returning to the faith (Baalei Teshuva). Due to the makeup of the Jewish community in the US, most of the prayer books are geared to the Ashkenazic custom. In more recent years, ArtScroll has collaborated with Sephardic community leaders in an attempt to bridge this gap. Examples of this include a Sephardic Haggadah published by ArtScroll, written by Sephardic Rabbi Eli Mansour, the book Aleppo, about a prominent Sephardic community in Syria, and a Sephardic prayerbook.

In translations and commentaries, ArtScroll accepts midrashic accounts in a historical fashion, and at times literally; it disagrees with textual criticism. Page "X" of the preface to ArtScroll's first publication set the tone: A long paragraph includes "No non-Jewish sources have even been consulted, much less quoted. I consider it offensive that the Torah should need authentication from the secular or so-called 'scientific' sources."

Frequently coalescing to give voice to ArtScroll's worldview is, in the words of Scherman, "a heavy combination of mussar and chassidus that we incorporate into our commentary" such as commentary by Hasidic Rabbis Tzadok HaKohen and Yehudah Leib Alter.

Despite the recent trend of most Haredi press omitting images of women from their magazines or newspapers, ArtScroll continues to publish pictures of women in their books. When someone authoring a biography to be published by ArtScroll requested that pictures of women be left out, ArtScroll "basically told him to go fly a kite, [and] we sent him to an adam gadol [a prominent Torah scholar] who basically washed the floors with him."

=== Transliteration system ===
ArtScroll publications, such as the Stone Editions of Tanakh (Hebrew Bible) and Chumash (Pentateuch) use many more transliterated Hebrew words than English words, compared to editions such as the Tanakh of the Jewish Publication Society. This reflects a higher use of untranslated Hebrew terminology in Haredi English usage.

ArtScroll's transliteration system for Hebrew transliteration for readers of the English language generally uses Ashkenazi consonants and Sefardi vowels. The two major differences between the way Sefardi and Ashkenazi Hebrew dialects are transcribed are as follows:

- the letter Tav without a dagesh (emphasis point) is transcribed as [t] and [s] respectively
  - ArtScroll uses the latter
- the vowel kamatz gadol, is transcribed [a] and [o] respectively
  - ArtScroll uses the former

As such, the following transliterations are used:

Ashkenazi	Sefardi	ArtScroll
Boruch	Barukh	Baruch
Shabbos	Shabbat	Shabbos (ArtScroll makes an exception due to widespread usage)
Succos	Succot	Succos
Avrohom	Avraham	Avraham
Akeidas Yitzchok	Akedat Itzhak	Akeidas Yitzchak

== Critical reviews ==
- A large number of grammatical errors exist in their Bible and commentary translations, changing the meaning of these passages. B. Barry Levy alleged in 1981:
  Dikduk (grammar) is anathema in many Jewish circles, but the translation and presentation of texts is, to a large extent, a philological activity and must be philologically accurate. The ArtScroll effort has not achieved a respectable level. There are dozens of cases where prepositions are misunderstood, where verb tenses are not perceived properly and where grammatical or linguistic terms are used incorrectly. Words are often vocalized incorrectly. These observations, it should be stressed, are not limited to the Bible text but refer to the talmudic, midrashic, targumic, medieval and modern works as well. Rabbinical passages are removed from their contexts, presented in fragmentary form thus distorting their contents, emended to update their messages even though these new ideas were not expressed in the texts themselves, misvocalized, and mistranslated: i.e. misrepresented.
- ArtScroll biographies have been criticized as providing incomplete and partial portrayals of Rabbinic figures. Notably, this is not disputed by ArtScroll. Rabbi Nosson Scherman stated that as it pertains to biographies the mission of ArtScroll "is to impart a positive message" without mentioning "disputes that can often become vitriolic."
- The commentary of Rashbam to the first chapter of Genesis in ArtScroll's Czuker Edition Hebrew Chumash Mikra'os Gedolos Sefer Bereishis (2014) has been censored. The missing passages are related to Rashbam's interpretation of the phrase in Genesis 1:5, "and there was an evening, and there was a morning, one day." The Talmud cites these words to support the halakhic view that the day begins at sundown. However, Rashbam takes a peshat (plain sense) approach, as he does throughout his commentary, reading the verse as follows: "There was an evening (at the conclusion of daytime) and a morning (at the end of night), one day"; that is, the day begins in the morning and lasts until the next daybreak. This comment of Rashbam was notably subject to sharp criticism by Ibn Ezra who placed a curse on any publishers who included this comment in their Chumash out of concern that the reading could cause a misinterpretation of Halacha and lead to Shabbat desecration. In their defense, ArtScroll points out that in standard Mikra'os Gedolos the entire commentary of Rashbam on the beginning of Bereishis is missing. When adding in from older manuscripts, they left out the exegeses to Genesis 1:5 because of questions to its authenticity.

== Bibliography ==
- Rabbi B. Barry Levy. "Our Torah, Your Torah and Their Torah: An Evaluation of the ArtScroll phenomenon.". In: "Truth and Compassion: Essays on Religion in Judaism", Ed. H. Joseph et al.. Wilfrid Laurier University Press, 1983.
- B. Barry Levy. "Judge Not a Book By Its Cover". Tradition 19(1)(Spring 1981): 89-95 and "Communications" within Tradition 1982;20(4)(Winter 1982): 370-375.
- B. Barry Levy. "ArtScroll: An Overview". In "Approaches to Modern Judaism" [Vol. I], Ed. Marc L. Raphael. Scholars Press, 1983.
- Jacob J. Schacter, "Facing the Truths of History". Torah u-Madda Journal 8 (1998–1999): 200-276.
- Jacob J. Schacter, "Haskalah, Secular Studies, and the close of the Yeshiva in Volozhin in 1892" Torah u-Madda Journal
- Jeremy Stolow, Orthodox by Design: Judaism, Print Politics, and the ArtScroll Revolution

== See also ==
- Soncino Press
- Hebrew Publishing Company
- Kehot Publication Society
