= History of the Jews in Czechoslovakia =

Aspect of Jewish history

== Historical demographics ==
Historical Czechoslovak Jewish population
Year	Pop.	±%
1921	354,342	—
1930	356,830	+0.7%
1946	55,000	−84.6%
1951	17,000	−69.1%
1959	18,000	+5.9%
1969	14,000	−22.2%
1981	12,000	−14.3%
1990	7,800	−35.0%

table 1. Jewish population by religion in Czechoslovakia

	1921, absolute no.	1921,% of total population	1930, absolute no.	1930,% of total population
Bohemia	79,777	1.19	76,301	1.07
Moravia	37,989	1.09	41,250	1.16
Silesia	7,317	1.09	(with Moravia)	(with Moravia)
Slovakia	135,918	4.53	136,737	4.11
Carpathian Rus	93,341	15.39	102,542	14.14
Total	354,342	2.6	356,830	2.42

Table 2. Declared Nationality of Jews in Czechoslovakia

Ethnonationality	1921,%	1930,%
Jewish	53.62	57.20
Czechoslovak	21.84	24.52
German	14.26	12.28
Hungarian	8.45	4.71
Others	1.83	1.29

== The Holocaust ==
For the Czechs of the Protectorate Bohemia and Moravia, German occupation was a period of brutal oppression. The Jewish population of Bohemia and Moravia (117,551 according to the 1930 census) was virtually annihilated. Many Jews emigrated after 1939; approximately 78,000 were killed. By 1945, some 14,000 Jews remained alive in the Czech lands. Approximately 144,000 Jews were sent to Theresienstadt concentration camp. Most inmates were Czech Jews. About a quarter of the inmates (33,000) died in Theresienstadt, mostly because of the deadly conditions (hunger, stress, and disease, especially the typhus epidemic at the very end of war). About 88,000 were deported to Auschwitz and other extermination camps. When the war finished, there were a mere 17,247 survivors. There were 15,000 children living in the children's home inside the camp; only 93 of those children survived.

== Communist period ==
The aftermath of the 1948 Czechoslovak coup d'état saw the control and repression of the Jewish religious community by the communist government, which essentially completed the destruction of the Jewish religious landscape. The communist party was ambivalent in mentioning that the majority of Czechoslovaks who were victims of the fascists were in fact of Jewish origin and the government undertook a de-Judaization of school textbooks. Orthodox Jews refer to that 40 year period as a "Communist holocaust".

== Czech National Archives ==
In 2011 the Czech National Archives digitized all volumes of the Registers of Births, Marriages, and Deaths of Jewish communities (1784-1949), except those needing substantial preservation and restoration. In accordance with the Register of Births, Marriages, and Deaths Act (N.301/2000 Coll.) only entries older than 100 years from the last entry in the Births Registers and 75 years from the last entry in the Marriages and Deaths Registers will be made accessible. The restriction does not apply to the Jewish control registers owing to the time range of entries. As of 2015 the digitization of the entire collection is complete and, within the given restrictions, accessible online.

== See also ==
- History of the Jews in the Czech lands
- History of the Jews in Slovakia
- History of the Jews in Carpathian Ruthenia
- List of Czech and Slovak Jews
- Ethnic minorities in Czechoslovakia
- Jewish Party (Czechoslovakia)
- Jewish Conservative Party
- Jewish Economic Party

== Bibliography ==
- The full text of Jews in the Czecho-Slovak State at Wikisource
- The full text of The Jewish Question at Wikisource
- Lenni Brenner, Zionism in the Age of the Dictators. A Reappraisal. (16. The Jewish Parties of Eastern Europe, Czechoslovakia – 2.4 Per Cent of an Empire), 1983
- Kateřina Čapková, «Czechs, Germans, Jews? National identities of Bohemian Jews, 1867–1938», 2005
- Kateřina Čapková, «Specific Features of Zionism in the Czech Lands in the Interwar Period», Judaica Bohemiae 38 (2002): 106–159
- Kateřina Čapková, "Židovská Strana", in: YIVO Encyclopaedia, YIVO Institute for Jewish Research, 2010
- Marie Crhová, "Jewish Politics in Central Europe: The Case of the Jewish Party in Interwar Czechoslovakia," Jewish Studies at the Central European University 2 (1999–2001)
- Crhová, Marie (2000). "Židovské strany v Československu v letech 1918–1938". In Pavel Marek; et al. (eds.). Přehled politického stranictví na území českých zemí a Československa v letech 1861–1998. Olomouc: Katedra politologie a evropských studií FFUP. pp. 250–253. ISBN 80-86200-25-6.
- The Jews of Czechoslovakia: Historical Studies and Surveys. Sponsored by the Society for the History of Czechoslovak Jews. Philadelphia: Jewish Publication Society of America. 3 volumes, 1968, 1971, 1984.
- Ludmila Nesládková, «The Professional and Social Characteristic of the Jewish Population in the First Czechoslovak Republic», Demografie, 2008, 50 (1), p. 1–14
