= Jewish Party =

Jewish Party may refer to:

- Jewish Party (Czechoslovakia), a party of the First Czechoslovak Republic
- Jewish Party (Romania), a party in Romania
- Jewish Conservative Party, a party of the First Czechoslovak Republic
- Jewish Economic Party, a party of the First Czechoslovak Republic
- Jewish National Party (Jüdischnationale Partei), an Austrian political party
- General Jewish Labour Party, a party in Poland
- Independent Jewish Workers Party, a party in Russia

== See also ==
- Jewish Communist Party (disambiguation)
