= Ethnic minorities in Czechoslovakia =

This article describes ethnic minorities in Czechoslovakia from 1918 until 1992.

== Background ==
Linguistic map of Czechoslovakia (1930)

Czechoslovakia was founded as a country in the aftermath of World War I with its borders set out in the Treaty of Trianon and Treaty of Versailles, though the new borders were approximately de facto established about a year prior. One of the main objects of these treaties was to secure independence for minorities previously living within the Kingdom of Hungary or to reunify them with an existent nation-state.

However some territorial claims were based on economic grounds instead of ethnic ones, for instance the Czechoslovak borders with Poland (to include coal fields and a railway connection between Bohemia and Slovakia) and Hungary (on economic and strategic grounds), which resulted in successor states with percentages of minorities almost as high as in Austria-Hungary before. Czechoslovakia had the highest proportion of minorities, who constituted 32.4% of the population.

During World War II, the Jewish and Romani minorities had been exterminated by the Nazis, and after the war most Germans and many Hungarians were expelled under the Beneš decrees. ALso Transcarpthaia was taken by the USSR. Afterwards, other minority groups migrated to Czechoslovakia, Roma from Hungary and Romania, Bulgarians fleeing the Soviet troops, Greeks and Macedonians fleeing the Greek Civil War. Later, migrant workers and students came from other Communist bloc countries, including Vietnamese and Koreans.

== Demographics ==
Table. 1921 ethnonational census

Regions	"Czechoslovaks" (Czechs and Slovaks)	Germans	Hungarians	Rusyns	Jews	others	Total population
Bohemia	4 382 788	2 173 239	5 476	2 007	11 251	93 757	6 668 518
Moravia	2 048 426	547 604	534	976	15 335	46 448	2 649 323
Silesia	296 194	252 365	94	338	3 681	49 530	602 202
Slovakia	2 013 792	139 900	637 183	85 644	70 529	42 313	2 989 361
Carpathian Ruthenia	19 737	10 460	102 144	372 884	80 059	6 760	592 044
Czechoslovak Republic	8 760 937	3 123 568	745 431	461 849	180 855	238 080	13 410 750

Population of Bohemia and Moravia, the Czech Socialist Republic and Czech Republic to ethnic group 1921–1991
Ethnic group	census 1921 ^{1}		census 1930		census 1950		census 1961		census 1970		census 1980		census 1991	
Ethnic group	Number	%	Number	%	Number	%	Number	%	Number	%	Number	%	Number	%
Czechs	6,758,983	67.5	7,304,588	68.3	8,343,558	93.9	9,023,501	94.2	9,270,617	94.4	9,733,925	94.6	8,363,768	81.2
Moravians	6,758,983	67.5	7,304,588	68.3	8,343,558	93.9	9,023,501	94.2	9,270,617	94.4	9,733,925	94.6	1,362,313	13.2
Silesians	6,758,983	67.5	7,304,588	68.3	8,343,558	93.9	9,023,501	94.2	9,270,617	94.4	9,733,925	94.6	44,446	0.4
Slovaks	15,732	0.2	44,451	0.4	258,025	2.9	275,997	2.9	320,998	3.3	359,370	3.5	314,877	3.1
Poles	103,521	1.0	92,689	0.9	70,816	0.8	66,540	0.7	64,074	0.7	66,123	0.6	59,383	0.6
Germans	3,061,369	30.6	3,149,820	29.5	159,938	1.8	134,143	1.4	80,903	0.8	58,211	0.6	48,556	0.5
Ukrainians	13,343	0.1	22,657	0.2	19,384	0.2	19,549	0.2	9,794	0.1	10,271	0.1	8,220	0.1
Rusyns	13,343	0.1	22,657	0.2	19,384	0.2	19,549	0.2	9,794	0.1	10,271	0.1	1,926	0.0
Russians	13,343	0.1	22,657	0.2	19,384	0.2	19,549	0.2	6,619	0.1	5,051	0.0	5,062	0.0
Vietnamese													421	0.0
Hungarians	7,049	0.1	11,427	0.1	13,201	0.1	15,152	0.2	18,472	0.2	19,676	0.2	19,932	0.2
Romani			227	0.0	19,770	0.2	19,392	0.2					32,903	0.3
Jews	35,699	0.4	37,093	0.4									218	0.0
Yugoslavs			4,749	0.0			3,957	0.0						
Romanians			966	0.0			3,205	0.0					1,034	0.0
Others/undeclared	10,038	0.1	5,719	0.1	11,441	0.1	10,095	0.1	36,220	0.4	39,300	0.4	39,129	0.4
Total	10,005,734		10,674,386		8,896,133		9,571,531		9,807,697		10,291,927		10,302,215	
^{1} On the territory of the census date.

Population of Slovakia according to ethnic group 1950–1991
Ethnic group	census 1950		census 1961		census 1970		census 1980		census 1991	
Ethnic group	Number	%	Number	%	Number	%	Number	%	Number	%
Slovaks		86.6		85.3		85.5	4,317,008	86.5	4,519,328	85.7
Hungarians		10.3		12.4		12.2	559,490	11.2	567,296	10.8
Romani^{1}		–		–		–	–	–	75,802	1.4
Czechs		1.2		1.1		1.0	57,197	1.1	59,326	1.1
Ruthenians		1.4		–		0.9		0.7	17,197	0.3
Ukrainians		1.4		–		0.9		0.7	13,281	0.3
Others/undeclared		0.5		1.2		0.4		0.4	22,105	0.4
Total	3,442,317		4,174,046		4,537,290		4,991,168		5,274,335	
^{1} Before 1991 the Romani were not recognized as a separate ethnic group

== Linguistic rights in the First Republic ==
According to article 128 §3 of the 1920 Constitution "Citizens of the Czechoslovak Republic may, within the limits of the common law, freely use any language they chose in private and business intercourse, in all matters pertaining to religion, in the press and in all publications whatsoever, or in public assemblies."

These rights were also provided for in article 57 of the Treaty of Saint-Germain-en-Laye in 1919: "The Czecho-Slovak State accepts and agrees to embody in a Treaty with the Principal Allied and Associated Powers such provision as may be deemed necessary by these Powers to protect the interests of inhabitants of that State who differ from the majority of the population in race, language or religion."

"In addition, the Language act granted minorities the right to address courts, offices and state organs in their own language, but only in communities where that national minority comprised more than 20 percent of the population."

The proceedings in the parliament were held either in the official languages of Czechoslovakia, Czech and Slovak, or in one of the recognized minority languages. Practically, everyone spoke their own language.

== Recognized minorities in the Socialist Republic ==
A Government Council for Nationalities was established in 1968 in the Czechoslovak Socialist Republic in accordance to Article 5 of the Constitutional Law No. 144/1968.

== Conflicts between Czechs and Slovaks ==
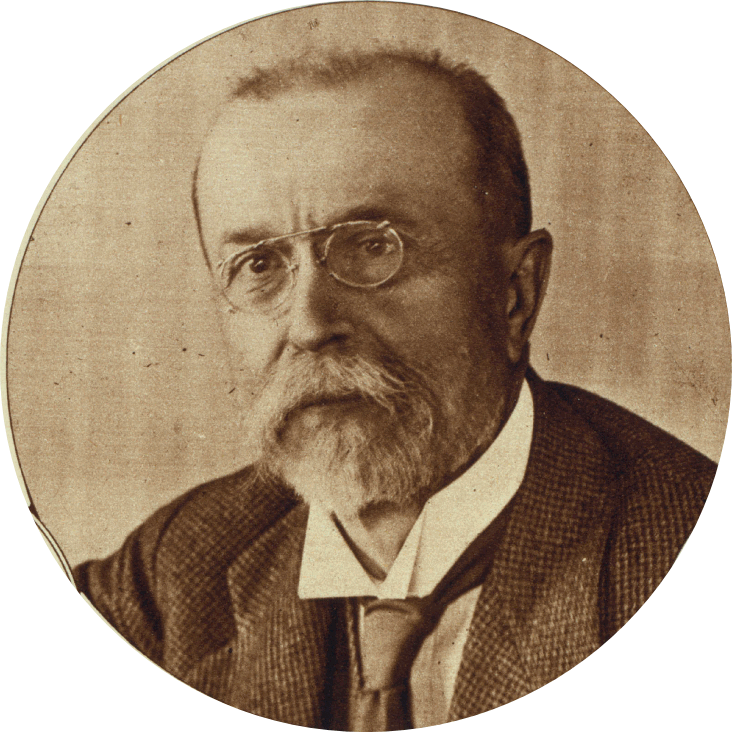
Tomáš Garrigue Masaryk

After World War I, the Czechs outnumbered Slovaks two to one in the new Czechoslovak state. The Slovaks lived in the shadow of the more internationally recognized Czech leadership and the great capital of Prague. The relationship between the Czechs and Slovaks was asymmetrical: Slovakia was considered an agrarian appendage to the highly industrial Czech nation, and the Czechs viewed Slovak culture as lacking in maturity and refinement. The languages of the two nations are closely related and mutually intelligible, and many Czechs viewed Slovak as a caricature of Czech. In his 1934 memoirs, the President of Czechoslovakia, Tomáš Garrigue Masaryk, writes he said in a 1924 interview to a French journalist of Le Petit Parisien: «There is no Slovak nation, it has been invented by Hungarian propaganda. The Czechs and Slovaks are brothers. They understand each other perfectly. All that separates them is the cultural level – the Czechs are more developed than the Slovaks, because the Magyars kept them in the dark. (...) In one generation there will be no difference between the two branches of our national family.» However the interview is nowhere to be found in the scanned full archives of Le Petit Parisien.

== Germans in Czechoslovakia ==
There were two German minority groups in the interwar Czechoslovak Republic, the Sudeten Germans in Bohemia and Moravia (present-day Czech Republic) and the Carpathian Germans in Slovakia and Subcarpathian Ruthenia (present-day Ukraine).

In addition, there was a sizeable German-speaking urban Jewish minority, and several Jewish politicians were elected as members of German minority parties like the German Social Democratic Workers Party in the Czechoslovak Republic or the German Democratic Liberal Party.

== Poles in Czechoslovakia ==
The Polish minority in Czechoslovakia (Polish: Polska mniejszość w Czechosłowacji, Czech: Polská národnostní menšina v Československu, Slovak: Poľská menšina v Československu) (today the Polish minority in the Czech Republic and Slovakia) is the Polish national minority living mainly in the Trans-Olza region of western Cieszyn Silesia. The Polish community is the only national (or ethnic) minority in the Czech Republic that is linked to a native specific geographical area. Trans-Olza is located in the north-eastern part of the country. It comprises Karviná District and the eastern part of Frýdek-Místek District. Many Poles living in other regions of the Czech Republic have roots in Trans-Olza as well.

Poles formed the largest ethnic group in Cieszyn Silesia in the 19th century, but at the beginning of the 20th century the Czech population grew. The Czechs and Poles collaborated on resisting Germanization movements, but this collaboration ceased after World War I. In 1920 the region of Trans-Olza was incorporated into Czechoslovakia after the Polish–Czechoslovak War. Since then the Polish population demographically decreased. In 1938 it was annexed by Poland in the context of the Munich Agreement and in 1939 by Nazi Germany. The region was then given back to Czechoslovakia after World War II. Polish organizations were re-created, but were banned by the Communist Party of Czechoslovakia. After the Velvet Revolution, Polish organizations were re-created again and Trans-Olza had adopted bilingual signs.

== Hungarians in Czechoslovakia ==
Hungarians (and other minorities e.g. Germans and Rusyns) were excluded from the constituent assembly, barring them from having any influence on the new Czechoslovak constitution. Later on, all the minorities gained the right to use their languages in municipalities where they constituted at least 20% of the population even in communication with government offices and courts. However due to gerrymandering and disproportionate distribution of population between Bohemia and Slovakia the Hungarians had little (if any) representation in the National Assembly and thus their influence on the politics of Czechoslovakia remained limited. The same considerations had limited the Slovak intelligentsia's political power as well.

== Jews in Czechoslovakia ==
During communism there were no signs of organized Jewish life and the situation was similar to others communities of Central and Eastern Europe controlled directly by the state. Most of the Jews left the country for Israel or the United States who wanted to follow Jewish lives and freedom. For many years there has been no religious leadership.

== Roma in Czechoslovakia ==
After World War I, the Roma people formed an ethnic community, living on the social periphery of the mainstream population. The state always focused on the Roma population not as a distinct ethnic minority, but rather perceived it as a particularly anti-social and criminal group. This attitude was reflected in the policy of collecting special police evidence—fingerprint collections of members of Romany groups (1925), a law about wandering Roma (1927).
Racism was not an unknown phenomenon under communism. Roma people were forced to resettle in small groups around the country left them isolated. This policy of the state was oriented toward one of assimilation of the Roma people (in 1958, Law No. 74, "On the permanent settlement of nomadic and semi-nomadic people"), forcibly limited the movement of that part of the Roma (perhaps 5%–10%) who still traveled on a regular basis. In the same year, the highest organ of the Communist Party of Czechoslovakia passed a resolution, the aim of which was to be "the final assimilation of the Gypsy population". The "Gypsy question" was decreased to a "problem of a socially-backward section of the population". During this period, the governments actively supported sterilisation and abortion for Roma women and the policy was not repealed until 1991.
The popular perception of Romani even before 1989 was of lazy, dirty criminals who abused social services and posed a significant threat to majority values.

== Rusyns and Ukrainians in Czechoslovakia ==
After World War II, the Rusyn nationality was declared to be Ukrainian in Czechoslovakia. The Rusyns refused Ukrainian identity, instead declaring their nationality as Slovak. Rusyn cultural institutions were changed to Ukrainian, and the usage of the Rusyn language in official communications ceased. Most settlement had only a Slovak-language school and a Slovak identity and orientation were adopted by most of the Rusyn populace, and they were, in effect, de-nationalized.

== See also ==
- Slovakization

== Maps ==
Maps showing the ethnic, linguistic or religious diversity are to be considered with much precaution as they may reflect the national or ideological beliefs of their author(s), or simply include errors. The same can be said about ethnic, linguistic or religious censuses, as the governments that organize them are not necessarily neutral.

- Races in Austria-Hungary, The Historical Atlas, New York, Henry Holt and Company, 1911
- Tchécoslovaquie. Ethnographie in: Louis Eisenmann, La Tchéco-Slovaquie, F. Paillar, 1921, p. 31
- Map of the Czechoslovak Republic (1918–1945). Map of nationalities, Atlas světa, Vojenský zeměpisný ústav v Praze (Military geographical institute in Prague), 1931
