= Eliyahu Kitov =

Polish Haredi rabbi and educator

Eliyahu Kitov

Avraham Eliyahu Mokotow (Hebrew: אברהם אליהו מוקוטוב; 22 March 1912 – 7 February 1976), better known as Eliyahu Kitov (Hebrew: אליהו כי טוב) was a Haredi rabbi, educator, and community activist.

== Biography ==
His younger years were spent in the town of Opole Lubelskie, where he learned in a cheder and a beis midrash. Most of his education was from his father, R. Michel, who was a Chassid, a close student of Rabbi Zadok HaCohen of Lublin, and had a great influence in forming his personality.

At the age of 17, he left Opole Lubelskie and moved back to Warsaw. There he studied in a beis midrash, worked at backbreaking jobs, while also doing public work for Agudath Israel of Poland. In his capacity as an educator, he gave lectures in Talmud, Tanakh, and Jewish thought. At that time, he also worked on a volunteer basis in secular Jewish schools for abandoned children, until his Aliyah to Israel in 1936. He married a sister of Rabbi Alexander Zusia Friedman, top activist for the Agudath Israel of Poland.

Upon his immigration to Israel, he worked in construction. As a Chareidi Jew, he was extremely dissatisfied with the terrible conditions the Chareidi workers experienced, and helped establish the Union of Agudath Israel workers (Poalei Agudat Yisrael). In addition to its concern for finding steady work for its members, this group eventually established cooperative factories of its own, in the fields of construction and industry. Rav Kitov engaged in this endeavor on a volunteer basis, alongside his own work in construction.

In 1941, he established a school for Chareidi children, where he served as principal for about eight years. At the same time, he became very involved with public affairs, editing the Poalei Agudat Yisrael newspaper, HaKol [The Voice]. In this journal, he published hundreds of articles, under various names, on a wide variety of subjects. In these writings, one can discern the budding of his writing capabilities that were to follow in his many books later on.

In the 1949 Knesset elections, he headed the Haredi List, but it failed to win a seat. He then contested the 1951 elections as head of the Sephardim-Ashkenazim Unity list, again failing to enter the Knesset.

In 1954, eighteen years after he immigrated to Israel, he left politics and public works and began to write full-time. Despite a lack of funds, he established a small publishing house called Aleph Institute Publications (now Yad Eliyahu Kitov), through which he published his various books.

From then until the end of his life, some twenty years, his main activity was writing and editing. However, at times he would get involved in education: giving guidance to teachers, lectures and publishing articles, mostly in the United States.

== Works ==
- Chassidim v’Anshei Ma’aseh – 5 volumes of Chassidic stories, 1956–1957, 1966. Two of these have been translated by M. Zakon and published in English as "In the Lion's Den," and "Sharp as a Needle."
- Ish U'Veito, 1957 – translated into English by Rabbi Nachman Bulman as "The Jew and his Home."
- Sefer HaToda'ah – His most famous work, translated into English by Rabbi Nachman Bulman as "The Book of Our Heritage." Also translated into Spanish by Rabbi Natan Grunblatt, Ed. Kehot Lubavitch Sudamericana, as "Nosotros en el Tiempo." The original Hebrew language version is available online at Hebrewbooks.org.
- Sefer HaParshiyot 1961–76 – a rich, comprehensive set on the weekly Torah portions. Although it is mainly based on Midrash and Talmud, early Biblical commentaries, and Chassidic texts, the imprint of the author is noticeable, and many of his own insights are blended into the text.

== Descendants ==
Rabbi Kitov had four sons, Oded, Shalom Zvi z"l, Yehoshua and Zurishadai, whose families live in Jerusalem; and three daughters, Rachel (Kitzes) and Ruth (Ben Arza), who also live in Jerusalem; and Na'ama (Nothman) z"l, who lived in South Africa. Many of them and/or their spouses continue to inspire the next generation with his teachings.

== Family history ==
There is much misinformation about the family history of Eliyahu Kitov. Literature states he was born Abraham Eliyahu Mokotovski in Warsaw. In fact, he was born Abraham Eliyahu Mokotow and used the surname Mokotow as late as 1953 when he made a trip to the United States. His Polish passport, which he surrendered upon immigrating to Palestine, shows his name as Mokotow. When running for the Knesset in 1947, he used the name Abraham Eliyahu Mokotovski.

He was born on March 22, 1912, in Warsaw, Poland, one of at least ten children, the majority born in Józefów nad Wisłą, Poland. The sibling who was just older than he was, was born in Zaklików, Poland, and the sibling just younger than he was, was born in Opole Lubelskie. All these towns are near each other and some distance from Warsaw.

He was the son of Michel Mokotow and Rachel Samburski. His father was born on November 22, 1871, in Połaniec, Poland. This town is in the vicinity of the three previously named towns. Michel’s parents were Chaim Tuvia Mokotow (born about 1842) and Malka Wajnberger (born about 1845). Chaim Tuvia's parents were Icek Mokotow (born June 10, 1809, in Warka, Poland) and Esther Holszkiner (born about 1807). Icek's parents were Tuvia David Mokotow (born about 1774, died 18 Jan 1842 in Warsaw) and Tauba Moskowicz (born about 1770). Tuvia's father’s name was Moszek Aronowicz (Moshe ben Aron) who died on July 25, 1810, in Warka, Poland, at the age of 83.
