= Agudath Israel =

Agudath Israel can refer to any of several related organizations, including:

- World Agudath Israel, an international movement
- Agudath Israel of America, an American organization
- Agudat Yisrael, an Israeli political party
