= Alexander Zusia Friedman =

Polish rabbi (1897–1943)

Rabbi Alexander Zusia Friedman
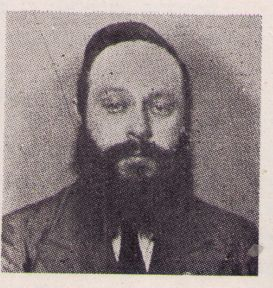
- Alexander Zusia Friedman

Personal life
- Born: Alexander Zusia Friedman; 9 August 1897 Sochaczew, Poland
- Died: November 1943 (age 46) Trawniki concentration camp
- Parent: Aharon Yehoshua Friedman
- Education: Sochatchov yeshiva

Religious life
- Religion: Judaism
- Denomination: Orthodox
- Position: Secretary-General
- Organisation: Agudath Israel of Poland
- Began: 1925
- Ended: 1943
- Residence: Warsaw

Alexander Zusia Friedman (Hebrew: אלכסנדר זושא פרידמן; 9 August 1897 – November 1943) was a prominent Polish Orthodox Jewish rabbi, communal activist, educator, journalist, and Torah scholar. He was the founding editor of the first Agudath Israel Hebrew journal, Digleinu (Our Banner), and author of Ma'ayanah shel Torah (Wellsprings of Torah), an anthology of commentaries on the weekly Torah portion, which is still popular today. He was incarcerated in the Warsaw Ghetto and deported to the Trawniki concentration camp, where he was selected for deportation to the death camps and murdered around November 1943.

== Early life ==
Friedman was born in Sochaczew (Sochatchov), Poland in 1899. His father, Aharon Yehoshua Friedman, was a poor shamash (synagogue caretaker); his mother supplemented the family income by selling wares in various fairs and markets. Alexander Zusia, their only son, proved himself to be an illui (exceptional student) at a very young age. When he was 3, he knew the entire Book of Genesis by heart. When he was 9, his melamed informed his father that he had nothing left to teach him. His father then arranged for him to learn with a Talmudic scholar who had been brought from another town by three wealthy families to teach their gifted sons. The tuition was three rubles each per week, a huge sum in those days. When these families heard that Alexander Zusia would join their group, they offered to pay his father the three rubles for the privilege of having Alexander Zusia learn with and motivate their sons. But his father insisted on paying the tuition himself, which amounted to his entire week's wages.

After his bar mitzvah, Alexander Zusia entered the Sochatchover yeshiva. In the summer of 1914 he became engaged to a girl from a nearby town. With the outbreak of World War I, he, his bride and his parents fled to Warsaw, where he studied under Rabbi Baruch Gelbart, a well-to-do Talmudic scholar who offered to support him, an offer which he refused. Friedman also attended lectures given by Rabbi Dr. Emanuel Carlebach for young Jewish refugees in Warsaw.

== Communal activist ==
Postwar Poland was full of new reforms and political movements that caused many Jewish youth to rebel against traditional Torah observance. Friedman founded the Orthodox Federation to strengthen youth who were still loyal to the Torah camp. At the First Knessia Hagedola in 1923, he read aloud a statement in the name of Haredi youth pledging allegiance to the Moetzes Gedolei HaTorah. His organization, like other Orthodox ones, united under the banner of Zeirei Agudath Israel, the Agudah youth movement. Friedman subsequently rose in the ranks of the Agudah youth movement to become its leading figure and advisor.

In 1925 Friedman was appointed secretary-general of Agudath Israel of Poland, a position he held until his death. He represented Agudath Israel in the Jewish Community Council of Warsaw, and was elected to the latter body three times, in 1926, 1930, and 1936. He was also the chairman of Keren HaTorah (the educational fund-raising arm of Agudath Israel), head of the Federation of Yesodei HaTorah Schools (the network of boys schools run by Agudath Israel), member of the National Executive of the Bais Yaakov movement in Poland, and director of the Bais Yaakov Teachers Seminary in Kraków. He was also a founder of the Seminary for Religious Teachers in Warsaw and lectured in this teacher-training institute.

In addition to his other gifts, Friedman was a masterful orator and writer. His speeches combined deep knowledge of the Torah with original insights, and he was the second most popular speaker for the Agudath Israel of Poland, second only to Rabbi Meir Shapiro, the Rav of Lublin. He wrote many articles for the religious press expounding the Torah point of view. In 1919 he founded and edited Digleinu (Our Banner), an Agudath Israel publication for young people. This paper was published between 1919 and 1924, and again between 1930 and 1931. From 1936 to 1938 he was a co-editor of Darkeinu (Our Path), the official journal of Agudath Israel of Poland. He also wrote poetry.

Friedman visited Palestine in 1934 as part of a delegation led by World Agudath Israel activist Rabbi Yitzhak-Meir Levin. His sister, who had married Rabbi Avraham Mokatowski (known by his pen name, Eliyahu Kitov), immigrated to Palestine before World War II, as did his parents, but he opted to remain in Poland because of his communal responsibilities.

== Warsaw Ghetto ==
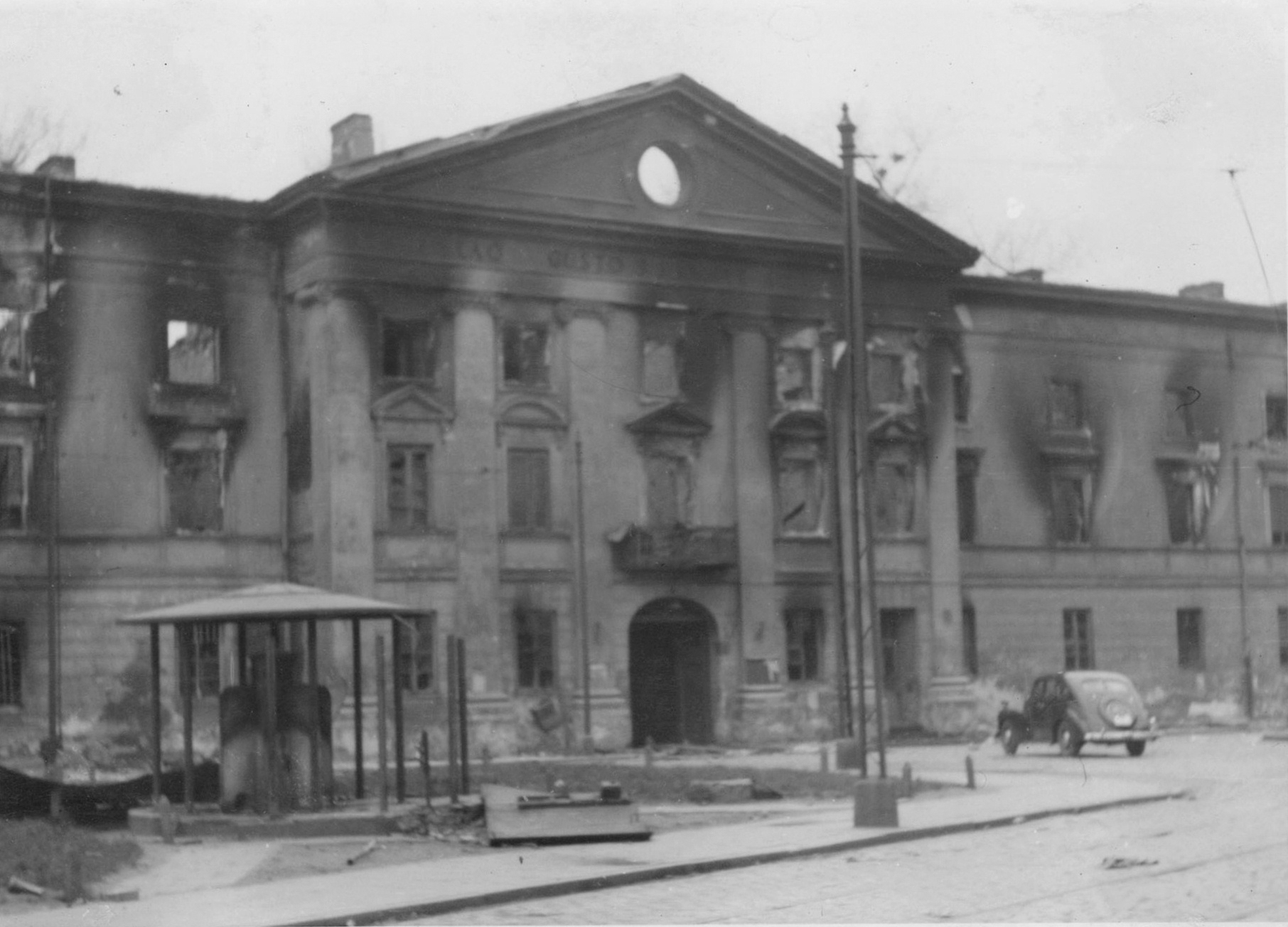
Ruin of the Judenrat building in Warsaw

On 20 November 1939 Friedman was arrested together with 21 other Polish Jewish leaders and jailed for one week to prevent them from resisting the construction of the Warsaw Ghetto. After his release he became the sole representative of Agudath Israel in the Warsaw Judenrat (Jewish Community Council), which advised the American Jewish Joint Distribution Committee regarding the latter's relief efforts. At that time, religious Jews faced much discrimination from secular Jewish relief organizations. Friedman successfully pushed for the opening of the first kosher soup kitchen in Warsaw, which was followed by the opening of several other free kitchens operated by Agudath Israel workers. The Joint and the Judenrat entrusted him with hundreds of thousands of dollars in stipends to distribute to the hundreds of refugee families that arrived penniless in Warsaw, a task he fulfilled with humility and sensitivity.

Friedman was one of the Torah leaders in the Warsaw Ghetto. He organized an underground network of religious schools, including "a Yesodei HaTorah school for boys, a Bais Yaakov school for girls, a school for elementary Jewish instruction, and three institutions for advanced Jewish studies". These schools, operating under the guise of kindergartens, medical centers and soup kitchens, were a place of refuge for thousands of children and teens, and hundreds of teachers. In 1941, when the Germans gave official permission to the Warsaw Judenrat to reopen Jewish schools, these schools came out of hiding and began receiving financial support from the official Jewish community. Though Judenrat president Adam Czerniaków often asked Friedman to become a member of the Judenrat, Friedman only agreed to organize the Judenrat's religious committee, which he staffed with representatives of all the religious political parties.

On 22 July 1942 the Germans began mass deportations from the Warsaw Ghetto to the death camps. Among those deported were Friedman's wife and 13-year-old daughter, their only child, who had been born to them after 11 years of marriage. Friedman alerted world Jewry to the start of deportations in a coded message. His telegram read: "Mr. Amos kept his promise from the fifth-third." He was referring to the Book of Amos, chapter 5, verse 3, which reads: "The city that goes out a thousand strong will have a hundred left, and the one that goes out a hundred strong will have ten left to the House of Israel".

At a general political meeting in the Warsaw Ghetto on 25 July 1942, attended by members of the Joint, the Bund, General Zionists, Left-wing Zionists, communists, Jewish socialists, and members of Agudath Israel, Friedman was one of the only Jewish leaders who advised against armed resistance. He said, "God will not permit His people to be destroyed. We must wait and a miracle will certainly occur". Historians believe that this position grew out of Agudath Israel's belief that armed opposition would cause the Germans to liquidate the Ghetto.

With the beginning of mass deportations, the Joint ceased its activities in the Ghetto and Friedman lost his financial support for his activities. With much effort, he procured a job as a shoemaker in the large Shultz factory, where he worked a 12-hour shift. Other Torah leaders who worked in the same factory were Rabbi Kalonymus Kalman Shapira, the Piasetzener Rebbe; Rabbi Moshe Betzalel Alter, brother of the Gerrer Rebbe; Rabbi Avraham Alter, Rav of Pabianice; and Rabbi David Alberstadt, Rav of Sosnowiec. When the Joint resumed its operations clandestinely between October 1942 and January 1943, Friedman rejoined the organization to assist religious Jews.

In March 1943 Friedman received a Paraguayan passport from Rabbi Chaim Yisroel Eiss, the Agudah rescue activist in Zurich, Switzerland, but he did not show it to the German authorities. Following the Warsaw Ghetto Uprising in April, Friedman was among those deported to the Trawniki concentration camp in the Lublin region. He was chosen for deportation to the death camps sometime after September 1943; his date of death is assumed to be November 1943, the same month the Trawinki camp was liquidated.

== Works ==
His popular work, Der Torah Kval (1937), translated into Hebrew as Ma'ayanah shel Torah and into English as Wellsprings of Torah, combines insights from classic and Hasidic Torah commentators with Friedman's own chiddushim (novel Torah ideas) on the weekly Torah portion and Haftarah. Friedman wrote this work in Yiddish rather than Hebrew, and in a lighter, easy-to-understand style of short teachings, to appeal to the many Jews who were no longer versed in the difficult language and concepts of Hebrew sefarim. This work continues to be popular today and is frequently cited by Torah writers.

Other published works include Kesef Mezukak (Refined Silver) (1923), a book of chiddushim on the principles of Talmudic study, and Kriah LeIsha Yehudit (Readings for the Jewish Woman) (1921). Friedman also published several textbooks for religious schools, including Iddish Lashon (Yiddish Language), a Yiddish primer. He wrote many other pamphlets and collections of chiddushim – including a collection on the Talmudic tractates of Gittin, Kiddushin, and Yoma that he titled Avnei Ezel (Guiding Stones) – which were lost in the war.
