= Pinchas Kohn =

Rabbi Dr. Pinchas Kohn
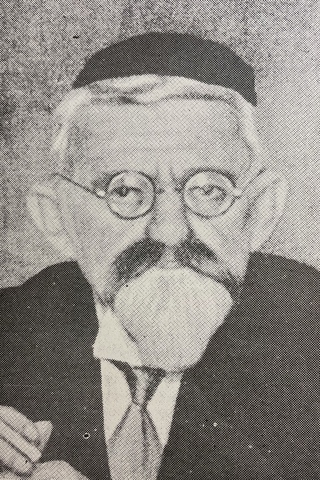
- Rabbi Dr. Pinchas Kohn

Chief Rabbi of Ansbach

Executive Director of World Agudath Israel

Personal life
- Born: 27 February 1867 Kleinerdlingen, Germany
- Died: 2 July 1941 (aged 74) Palestine
- Parent: Rabbi Mordechai Michael Kohn
- Known for: Last Rabbi of Ansbach, Executive Director of World Agudath Israel
- Occupation: Rabbi, Executive Director

Religious life
- Religion: Judaism
- Denomination: Orthodox

Rb Dr Pinchas Kohn was the last rabbi of Ansbach, Germany. He was also the executive director of the World Agudath Israel organisation.

== Biography ==
Rb Dr Kohn was born in Kleinerdlingen, Germany, on 27 February 1867. His father was Rb Mordechai Michael Kohn (1826 - 1888), who was the last rabbi of the Wallerstein District Rabbinate.

He studied under the tutelage of his maternal grandfather, Rabbi David Weisskopf (a study partner of Rabbi Jacob Ettlinger) at a young age. By the time Dr Kohn was five years old he was fluent in the five books of the chumash. Rabbi Wiesskopf ordained him as a rabbi when he became bar-mitzva. Later he studied in the Yeshiva of Rabbi Selig Auerbach.

He became the rabbi of Mannheim, and later in 1893 was appointed rabbi of Ansbach by the prince regent.

Dr Kohn stemmed from the Kohn-Rappoport rabbinical family that had been established for hundreds of years in southern Germany. His family tree shows that this family was descended from a Rappoport who was part of the Expulsion of Jews from Spain.

He was a student and an admirer of Hildesheimer and S.R. Hirsch, nevertheless he remained throughout his life an "old" German Jew. He judged neo-orthodoxy critically, with all due respect for Hirsch. His primary contention was that whereas Hirsch based Judaism on an ideology, old German Jewry was based simply on living life as a Jew. Dr Kohn felt that the traditional Jewish world outlook is formed by the inner experience of observing the Torah and through the external world experiences that are encountered as Jews.

In 1916 Rabbi Dr Kohn became the rabbinical advisor to the German occupying forces of Poland together with Rabbi Dr Emanuel Carlebach (see photo here). In this role he worked closely with Ludwig Haas.

He was also the editor of the Judische Monatshefte which he published together with Rb Dr. Salomon Breuer.

At this time, Zionists and Jewish socialists, who were still a small minority of Polish Jewry, had hoped that the Hasidic masses would continue to behave as in the past, to be politically passive and to play no role in public life. Even when the Hasidic community sought to enter politics, Jabotinsky, the future leader of the Zionist Revisionist Party, claimed that the Orthodox in Poland should be denied the right to vote because they lacked any civil experience (Morgenstern 65).

Dr Kohn was one of the main factors in creating a completely new situation. He gave the Hasidim a political organization, a Rabbinical Association and a daily newspaper (Doss Yiddische Vort).

In contrast to the national autonomy of the Zionists, he founded the concept of a politically active religious society, regarding which he drafted the "Ordinance; The organization of the Jewish religious community in the Government of Warsaw", which was adopted in late 1916 by the German administration.

In his memoirs (chap 10), Dr Kohn writes: "The government of the occupying forces told me that the law [defining the status of the Jews in Poland] had to be such that the Polish Government would agree to it... From these discussions I understood that that it would be entirely impossible to organise the matters of the Jews and Judaism on a nationalistic basis, but only on a religious basis." Also in his memoirs, Dr. Kohn writes that he was of the opinion that if the Jews of Poland would exert their rights as a minority group within Poland then this would arouse extreme antisemitic feeling amongst the Poles which would physically endanger the Jews living in Poland.

In the eyes of the Zionists, Kohn was a traitor (Bar Ilan 24 25. p. 140). Even some of his Orthodox associates were not in agreement with his policies (ibid 143–145).

Dr Kohn was instrumental in forming the Union of the Orthodox (Jews). This was renamed to Shlomei Emunei Yisroel (wholly faithful of the Jews) two years later. At the third national congress of the party, in October 1928, the name of the party was changed to Agudat Israel.

Dr Kohn was the executive president of the world aguda movement and travelled throughout Europe persuading communities to open local branches of the organisation.

In 1939 he was rescued from Germany by his son-in-law, Ephraim Stefansky, who bribed the Swiss border guards to allow Dr Kohn to cross the border from Germany (family recollections). He then travelled to Palestine via London.

In Palestine he held dialogues with Arab sheiks concerning how the Arabs and the Jews could peacefully co-exist. He wrote weekly articles for the Agudath Israel weekly Kol Yisrael, continuing writing in his final illness. Articles that he had prepared continued to appear in the newspaper for three weeks after his passing on 2 July 1941. His funeral was attended by Rabbi Yitzchok Zev Soloveitchik, Rabbi Avraham Mordechai Alter and Dr Moshe Wallach.
