= Czech Republic–South Korea relations =

- Czech Republic: South Korea

Czech Republic–South Korea relations are foreign relations between the Czech Republic and South Korea.

== History ==
Czechia and Korea share similar historical experiences. In 1919, a meeting took place in Vladivostok between the Korean independence leader Yeo Un-hyeong and General Radola Gajda, commander of the Czechoslovak Legion. While returning via Siberia, Czechoslovak soldiers secretly sold or handed over thousands of weapons and vast quantities of ammunition to Korean resistance forces. These arms directly enabled Korean victories in the legendary battles of Bongodong and Cheongsanri in 1920. Both Korea and the Czechia fought for independence as small states, with their primary goal being the preservation of their own identity and survival in the shadow of larger powers—unlike China and Poland, which, although they also fell victim to the Axis powers, fought not only for independence but also to regain their former historical might and influences. During World War II, Korea was fully absorbed by the Empire of Japan, just as the Czech Republic were by Nazi Germany. Both countries were annexed by a single occupying power, whereas Poland was controlled by the USSR and the Nazi Germany, and China—particularly the northeast—was controlled by USRR and Empire of Japan (via the puppet state of Manchukuo). The Czechs saw parallels in Korea's fate, and in one issue of "Československý denník", Czech soldiers wrote with empathy about Korea's aspirations for freedom.

The foreign relations between the Czech Republic and South Korea were established on March 22, 1990.

In November 2020, South Korea, along with Russia, bid for the $6.74 billion construction of the Dukovany Nuclear Power Station, of which the groundbreaking is scheduled for 2029 and the project are forecast to completed in 2036. The CEO of the Czech power utility ČEZ Daniel Beneš said that the winner would be selected by the end of 2022.

Zuzana Štíchová, the head of the Czech Foreign Ministry's Public Affairs Bureau, raised questions about South Korea's law against anti-Pyongyang leaflets which had passed in December 2020. She projected that there will be intra-E.U. discussions on Seoul's measure in the near future, implying that it may become an agenda item not only in the Czech Republic but also in the European Union.

== Dukovany Nuclear Power Station ==
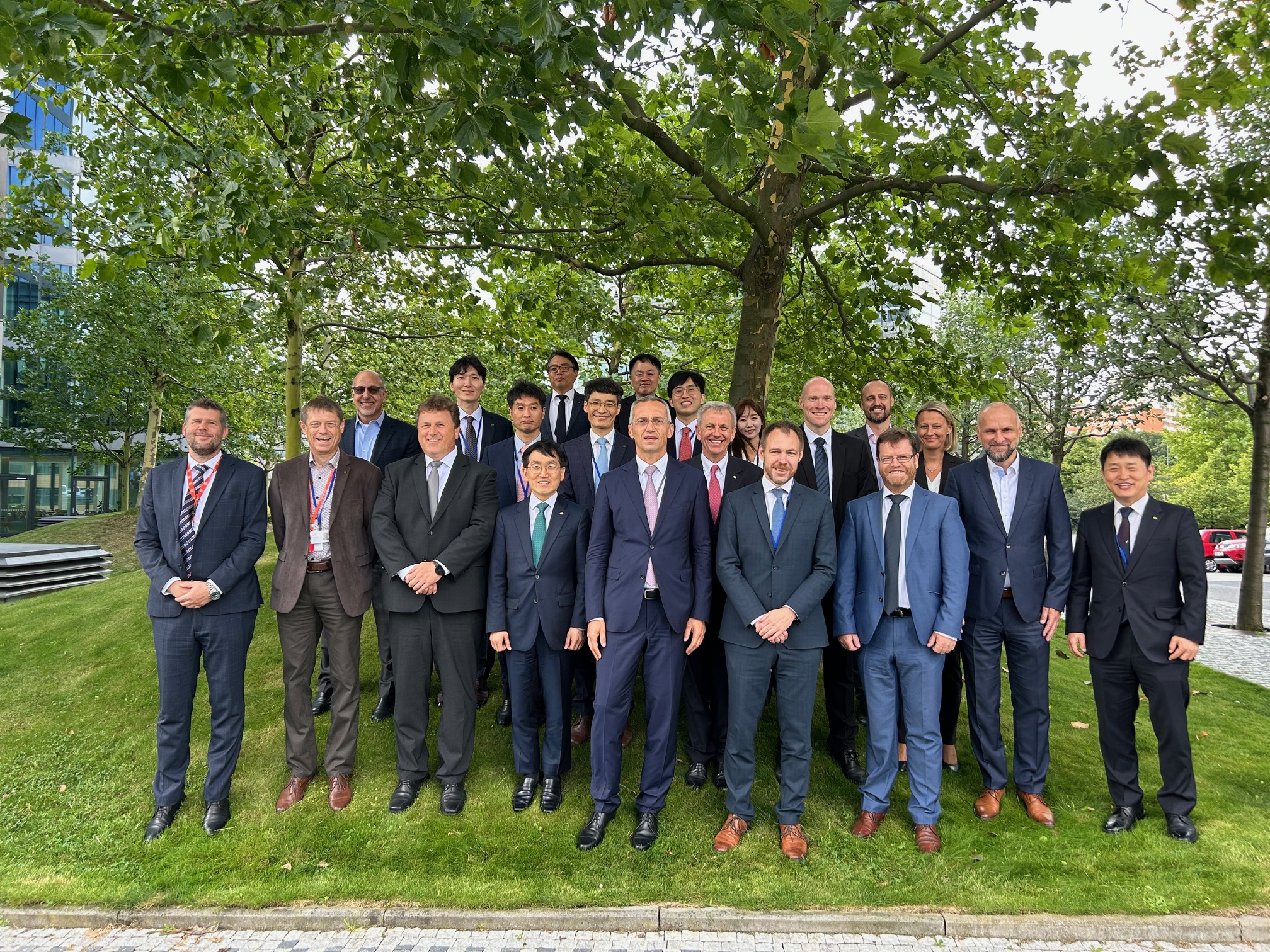
KHNP Czech Nuclear Power Negotiation Response Task Force Team visited Czech Republic in July 2024.

In November 2018, South Korean President Moon Jae-in vowed to expand bilateral cooperation with the Czech Republic. While visiting Prague en route to a G20 summit, Moon and Czech Prime Minister Andrej Babiš agreed to seek increase cooperation into various new sectors, including artificial intelligence.

In July 2024, South Korean President Yoon Suk Yeol attended the NATO summit and met with Czech President Petr Pavel to highlight South Korea's strengths in support of the Korea Hydro & Nuclear Power bid. On July 17, 2024, Korea Hydro & Nuclear Power was selected as the preferred bidder to build two reactors at the Dukovany nuclear power plant, beating out EDF of France. In response, South Korea's Minister of Trade, Industry and Energy Ahn Duk-geun said at a press conference, "South Korea has price competitiveness internationally based on technology prowess and project management capabilities."

In September 2024, President Yoon and Prime Minister Petr Fiala attended the signing of a memorandum of understanding on nuclear cooperation during a visit to two nuclear power companies in Plzeň, Doosan Škoda Power and JS Škoda. "The new nuclear reactors will be built together by South Korea and the Czech Republic, Yoon Said. "The Korean government will fully support the faithful implementation of the nuclear energy agreements."

== Migration ==
As of 2018, there were 2,673 South Korean citizen with a residence permit in the Czech Republic.

== Trade and economy ==
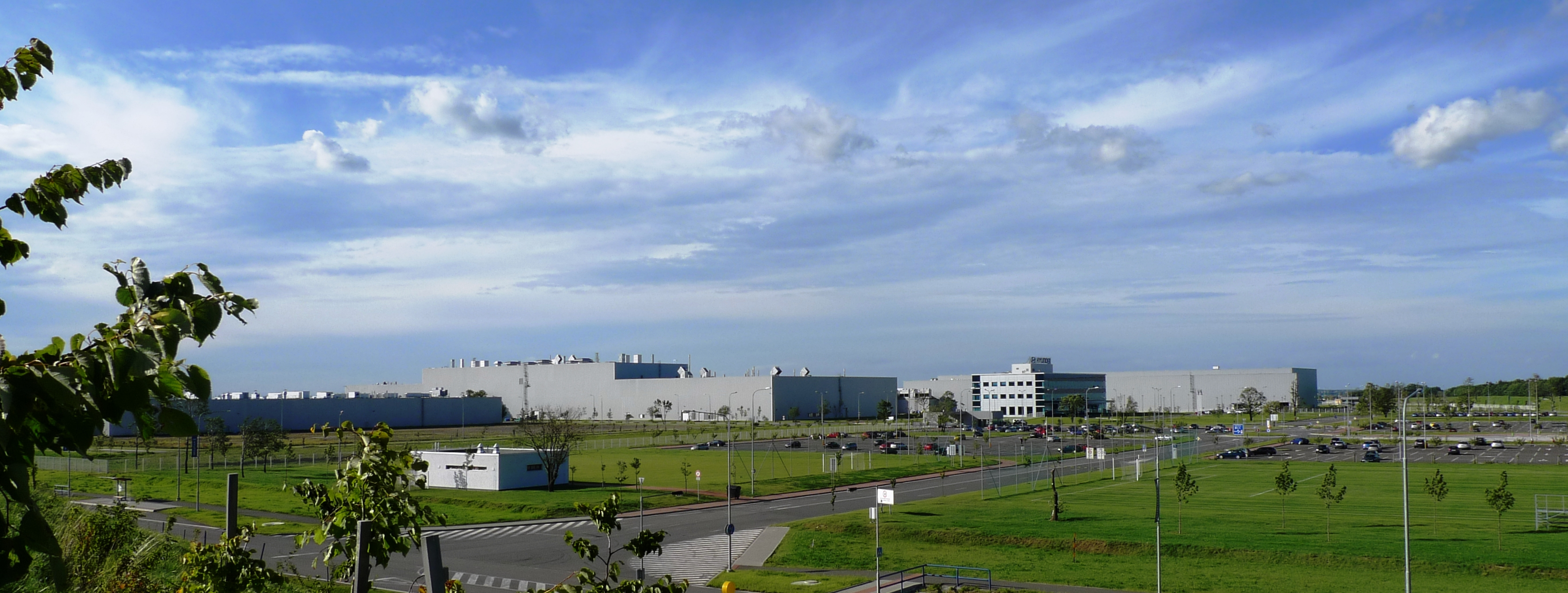
Hyundai Motor Manufacturing Czech – major South Korean investment in the Czech Republic

As of 2015, South Korea was Czech Republic's third largest business partner outside the EU. In 2015, the Czech Republic and South Korea signed a strategic partnership agreement with the aim stated by Czech prime minister Sobotka to expand business ties beyond the sphere of car manufacture into defense, infrastructure and nuclear power, as well as rail transportation. In 2018, bilateral trade between the two countries neared $3 billion.

The volume of trade between the two countries is increasing and will exceed $4.4 billion in 2023. As of 2023, South Korea is the fourth largest investor in the Czech Republic, with more than 100 South Korean companies operating in the Czech Republic.

In terms of tourism, South Korea is the Czech Republic's eight-largest source of visitors as of 2019, with 416,000 nationals visiting the country, following 417,000 in 2017 and 325,000 in 2016. In 2019, the Czech Republic applied a program to automate immigration clearance for South Koreans; consequently, South Korea is the only non-European Union country, whose nationals are eligible for the e-gate clearance system.

== Economic cooperation ==
During President Yoon’s official visit to the Czech Republic in September 2024, the two countries also agreed to sign a comprehensive industrial and investment cooperation agreement, the Trade and Investment Promotion Framework, and to launch a supply chain economic dialogue. They also held a forum where business leaders from the two countries, including Samsung Electronics Chairman Lee Jae-yong, SK Group Chairman Choi Tae-won, LG Group Chairman Koo Kwang-mo, and Hyundai Motor Group Chairman Chung Eui-sun, gathered to explore areas of cooperation in various cutting-edge industries.

== Diplomatic missions ==
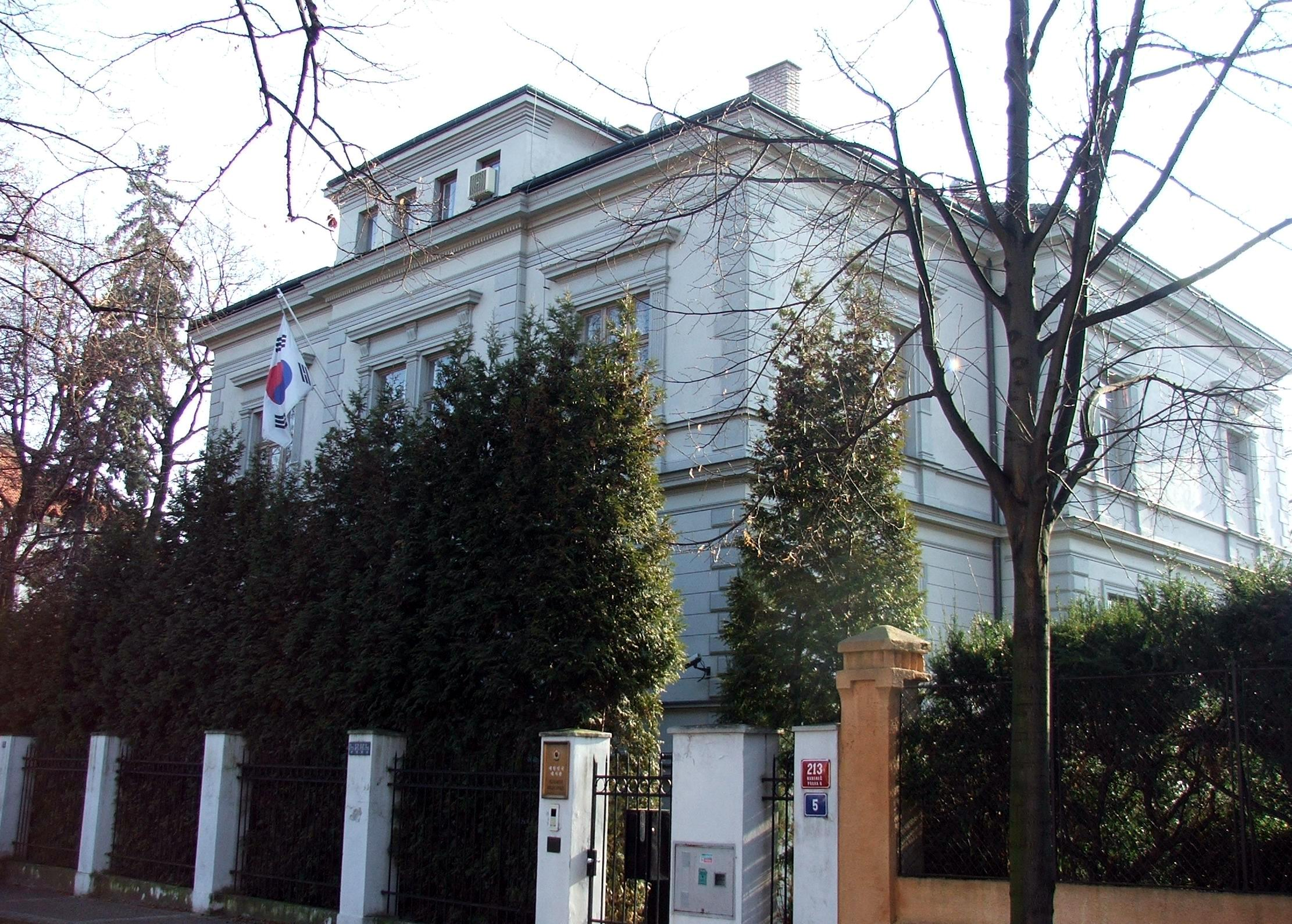
South Korean embassy in Prague

- The Czech Republic has an embassy in Seoul.
- South Korea has an embassy in Prague.

== See also ==
- Foreign relations of the Czech Republic
- Foreign relations of South Korea
- Koreans in the Czech Republic
- List of diplomatic missions of the Czech Republic
- List of diplomatic missions of South Korea
