= Nachman Bulman =

American rabbi

Rabbi Nachman Bulman נחמן בולמן

Personal life
- Born: 1925 Lower East Side, Manhattan, New York, U.S.
- Died: July 6, 2002 (aged 76–77) Neve Yaakov, Jerusalem, Israel
- Buried: Har HaMenuchot, Jerusalem
- Parent(s): Rabbi Meir Bulman and Etil Bulman
- Education: Yeshiva University
- Occupation: Rabbi, educator, translator

Religious life
- Religion: Judaism
- Denomination: Orthodox
- Yeshiva: Rabbi Isaac Elchanan Theological Seminary (RIETS)
- Position: Rabbi of Nachliel Synagogue, Neve Yaakov
- Main work: The Book of Our Heritage, Jew and His Home, Rite and Reason (translations)
- Semikhah: Rabbi Isaac Elchanan Theological Seminary

Nachman Bulman (also known as Nathan Bulman, Hebrew: נחמן בולמן ;1925-July 6, 2002) was an American rabbi associated with Orthodox Judaism. He was born to Rabbi Meir and Etil Bulman after a blessing from the Rebbe of Ger, Rabbi Avraham Mordechai Alter. He grew up on the Lower East Side, Manhattan, and was, for a brief period, part of the circle of the Rebbe of Modzitz, remaining close to the Rebbe until the latter's death.

He studied at Rabbi Isaac Elchanan Theological Seminary (RIETS), where obtained his semicha ("rabbinical ordination"). Turning down offers from various communities because of inadequate standards, he eventually accepted a position in Danville, Virginia, which had a small Jewish community that he served for three years. Subsequently, he served as a synagogue rabbi and Jewish educator in number of cities in the United States for most of his life. In 1975, he moved to Israel and served as rabbi in Migdal HaEmek starting in 1979. During the last few years of his life he served as rabbi of the Nachliel Synagogue in Neve Yaakov, Jerusalem, where he resided at the time of his death.

== Ideology and impact ==
Rabbi Bulman was a student of Rabbi Joseph Soloveitchik at Yeshiva University where he received his rabbinic ordination. However, in terms of religious ideology, Bulman chose to follow and be identified with Agudath Israel of America, one of Haredi Judaism's largest movements. He referred to himself as a disciple of Rabbi Eliyahu Kitov. At a later stage in his life, Bulman sometimes dressed in the style typical of Gerrer Hasidim, even donning a spodik in his later years, on the Sabbath and holidays.

He was a popular teacher, lecturer, writer, translator of Hebrew language works into English, and builder of Jewish communities in both America and Israel.

In the late 1970s, he taught in Israel at Yeshivat Ohr Somayach in Jerusalem serving as its mashgiach ruchani and continued to serve in that capacity after he established a community in Migdal HaEmek. He was seen as a great visionary and was known for understanding modern political events through the lens of timeless Torah wisdom. Often he would compare the events of the weekly Haftorah with current events in his sermons. He was also a great student of Rabbi Samson Raphael Hirsch's teachings and would sometimes incorporate those teachings into his lectures.

After leaving Migdal HaEmek, Bulman again taught at Ohr Sameyach and resided nearby in Maalot Dafna. In 1996 he founded a Beis Midrash, Nachlas Tzvi, in Telz-stone, named after the writings of Rabbi Samson Raphael Hirsch. He strove to teach immigrants and others how to function within Israeli Haredi society without losing their individual identities. During the final three years of his life he lived in Neve Yaakov, a northern neighborhood of Jerusalem, where he founded Bais Medrash Nachliel, and where Kollel Nachmani was established in his memory.

He translated Rabbi Eliyahu Kitov's Hebrew books The Book of Our Heritage, Jew and His Home and Rite and Reason to English. His name was often written as Nathan Bulman in English.
