= Jewish Conservative Party =

Jewish Conservative Party אידישע קאָנסערוואַטיווע פּאַרטיי (Yiddish) Єврейська консервативна партія (Rusyn) Židovská konzervativní strana (Czech) Židovská konzervatívna strana (Slovak)
- Leader: Koloman Weiss
- Founded: 1921
- Dissolved: 1925?
- Split from: Jewish Party
- Merged into: Jewish Economic Party
- Ideology: Ashkenazi Haredim interests, Religious conservatism, Agrarianism
- Political position: Right-wing
- Religion: Haredi Judaism
- National affiliation: Republican Party of Farmers and Peasants (partner)
- International affiliation: World Agudath Israel

The Jewish Conservative Party (Czech: Židovská konzervativní strana) was a political party of the First Czechoslovak Republic. It was created in August 1921 as a regional Carpathian Ruthenia splinter party from the Jewish Party by Markus Ungar, who was the top candidate of the Jewish Economic Party in Carpathian Ruthenia for the 1925 Czechoslovak parliamentary elections.

== Bibliography ==
- Lenni Brenner, Zionism in the Age of the Dictators. A Reappraisal. (16. The Jewish Parties of Eastern Europe, Czechoslovakia – 2.4 Per Cent of an Empire), 1983
- Kateřina Čapková, "Židovská Strana", in: YIVO Encyclopaedia, YIVO Institute for Jewish Research
- Marie Crhová, “Jewish Politics in Central Europe: The Case of the Jewish Party in Interwar Czechoslovakia,” Jewish Studies at the CEU 2 (1999–2001)
