= Bulgarians in Czechoslovakia =

The Czech-Bulgarian relations date as far back as to the times of the Great Moravia.

== 19th century ==
Their importance rose especially during the time of the Czech National Revival of the 19th century and related ideas of Pan-Slavism. Among the pioneers of the Slavic studies (including the Bulgarian studies) were the Czech and Slovak personalities such as Josef Dobrovský, František Ladislav Čelakovský, Jan Kollár, Karel Jaromír Erben and foremost Pavel Josef Šafařík, who had close ties with Bulgarian students in Prague. His interest in Bulgarian history, language and nation helped to strengthen Bulgarian self-awareness.

In 1862 the Bulgarian and Czech students in Prague established a secret society Pobratim in order to support Bulgarian independence movement against the Ottoman rule and to support the unification of the Slavic nations. In 1869 the Bulharská matice - The Postojanstvo Society was established in Tábor aiming for the same purpose. This was followed by the so-called Czech invasion into Bulgaria, of which Šafářík's grandson Konstantin Josef Jireček was the main personality. He took part in establishing the Bulgarian state services and became Bulgarian Minister of Education in the 1880s. Countless other Czechs took part in build-up of modern education and judiciary, cultural institutions as well as railways in Bulgaria. Many Czech teachers, artists and qualified craftsmen took part in effort to build up Bulgarian state. At the same time Czech industrialists established new undertakings in Bulgaria, foremost sugar refineries and breweries. Meanwhile, many Bulgarians immigrated to the Czech lands; mostly they were unskilled workers and young students wishing to obtain education at the Czech Universities.

In 1890 the first official Czech-Bulgarian association was established (Bulharská Sednjanka), while in the independent Czechoslovakia local associations grew in the large towns.

== Post-World War II ==
Bulgarians citizens in the Czech Republic as of December 31
Year	Pop.	±%
2011	7,435	—
2012	8,222	+10.6%
2013	9,132	+11.1%

Large numbers of Bulgarians escaped to Czechoslovakia after Bulgaria (at the time ally of Nazi Germany) was occupied by the Red Army at the end of the second world war. Thousands more benefited from joint program of governments of Czechoslovakia and Bulgaria in years 1946–8, in which whole families immigrated to the areas from which the Germans were expelled. Subsequently, many of these immigrants moved into larger cities, where they obtained jobs usually in industry.

During the socialist era the Bulgarian clubs were united under umbrella organisation Bulgarian Cultural Organisation. The most friendly attitude of Czechs towards Bulgarians suffered hard blow as the Bulgarian army took part in the 1968 Invasion of Czechoslovakia.

== See also ==
- Bulgaria–Czech Republic relations
- Bulgaria–Slovakia relations
- Czechs and Slovaks in Bulgaria
