= Koreans in the Czech Republic =

Ethnic group

Total population
- 2,673 South Koreans (2018); 3 North Koreans (2018)

Languages
- Korean, Czech

Religion
- Predominantly Christianity; Minority: Korean Buddhism

Related ethnic groups
- Korean diaspora

There are small number of resident Koreans in the Czech Republic, primarily citizens of South Korea.

== North Koreans ==
=== Students and scholars ===
One early Korean scholar in Czechoslovakia was Han Hŭng-su. Born in 1909, he studied in Vienna, Bern, and Fribourg in the late 1930s and early 1940s before coming to Prague in either 1942 or 1943. He stayed there for a few years, translating Korean literature into German and Czech and writing a book and various articles in those languages about the history of Korea. A supporter of communism, he chose Pyongyang as his destination when he returned to the Korean Peninsula in the late 1940s, but was purged near the end of the Korean War.

Most North Korean international students in the 1950s studied in either Czechoslovakia or Hungary. In 1955, there were student demonstrations at Charles University in response to the financial assistance and preferential treatment shown to North Korean students. There were about 150 North Korean students in Czechoslovakia in 1989, according to the personal testimony of two among them—both students at a dental college in Prague—who defected to South Korea in February that year. Other sources reported 200. North Korea recalled them all back home after the fall of the Berlin Wall in 1990.

=== Guest workers ===
There was formerly a contingent of nearly four hundred North Koreans working in the Czech Republic, including about ninety women working as seamstresses in Snezka, a company in Náchod that manufactures sheets for cars and travel bags, and others in Skuteč. M-Plus, a Czech labour broker company with contacts in the North Korean Ministry of Light Industry, arranged most of their visas and employment contracts. The workers were typically women between 18 and 22 years of age, and came from politically reliable families; they saw their assignment to the Czech Republic as a reward and a good opportunity to earn money.

According to media reports, about half eventually learned to speak Czech and sometimes socialised with the other workers at their factories, primarily Ukrainian migrants and local people, discussing work-related topics. European media coverage described the workers as "21st-century slaves", a characterisation which their employers strongly disputed, pointing out that their wages, work hours, and overtime payments were the same as their colleagues of other nationalities. However, they always moved around in groups, never alone, and were accompanied by a North Korean government minder at all times. In 2004, a television crew came to Skuteč in an attempt to film and investigate North Korean workers there. However, shortly after their arrival, they were attacked by 30 North Korean women throwing stones, and lost their footage. Media figures later speculated that the widespread coverage of the North Korean workers' plight had made them feel threatened, and that the publicity may have actually damaged their standing and put their families in danger. A 2006 Czech police investigation revealed that the women deposited nearly 80% of their wages into a collective bank account; this was further corroborated by testimony from defector Kim Tae-san, formerly an official at the North Korean embassy in Prague.

Eventually, due to the negative publicity, and pressure from U.S.-based customers due to the 2006 North Korean nuclear test and the resulting sanctions, many companies stopped employing North Korean guest workers, and the Czech Republic stopped issuing employment visas to them. However, even after the existing visas expired, 144 North Koreans continued to work in the Czech Republic. Media reports speculated that the remaining North Koreans may have been granted individual exemptions by immigration officials, or had been able to obtain other types of visas.

== South Koreans ==
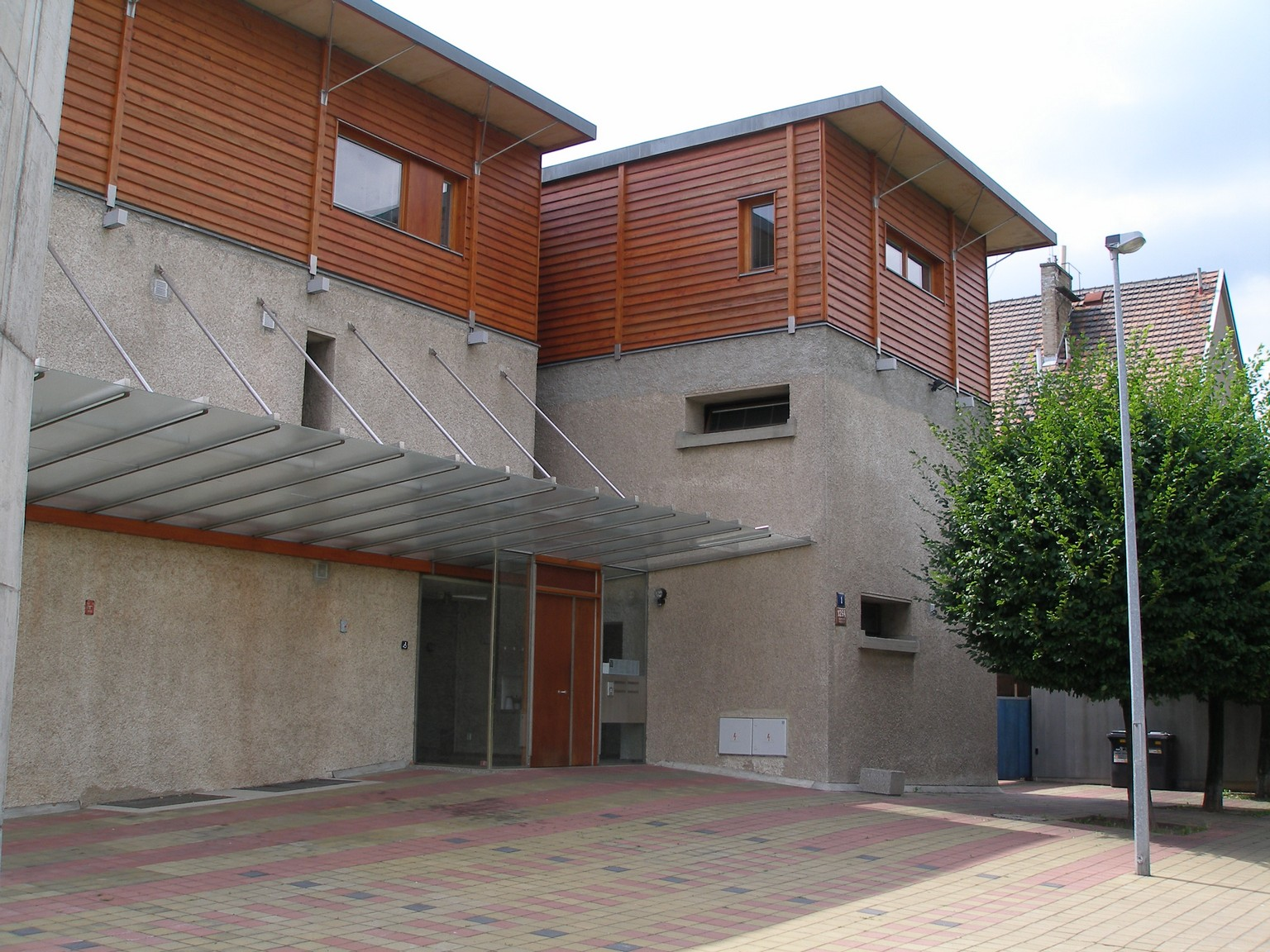
U Jákobova žebříku church in Prague 8 district

The population of South Koreans in the Czech Republic more than quadrupled between 2005 and 2009, according to the statistics of South Korea's Ministry of Foreign Affairs and Trade. South Korea's National Institute for International Education Development recognises one Korean weekend school in the Czech Republic, the Prague Hangul School (프라하한글학교), founded in January 1997; as of 2004, it employed seven teachers and enrolled 35 students at the kindergarten through middle school levels. Portrayals in popular culture include the show Lovers in Prague.

The South Korean embassy in Prague lists one Roman Catholic church with a Korean priest and five Protestant churches with Korean pastors in the city. Additionally, the evangelical church U Jákobova žebříku ("At Jacob's Ladder"), near the Kobylisy station of the Prague Metro, also hosts services in Korean. There are also six Korean Buddhist temples in the Czech Republic.

== See also ==
- Czech Republic–South Korea relations
