= Jewish Economic Party =

- Leader: Koloman Weber
- Founder: Slovak Orthodox rabbis
- Founded: October 1925
- Dissolved: 1926
- Merger of: Jewish Conservative Party
- Succeeded by: Jewish Republican Party
- Ideology: Ashkenazi Haredim interests, Religious conservatism, Agrarianism
- National affiliation: Republican Party of Farmers and Peasants (partner)
- International affiliation: World Agudath Israel

The Jewish Economic Party was a political party of the First Czechoslovak Republic. It was created in October 1925 by Slovak Orthodox rabbis as a regional Slovak party against the Zionist-controlled Jewish Party. It took part in the 1925 Czechoslovak parliamentary elections, where it got 16,861 votes (0.24%) and no seat.

== Bibliography ==
- Lenni Brenner, Zionism in the Age of the Dictators. A Reappraisal. (16. The Jewish Parties of Eastern Europe, Czechoslovakia – 2.4 Per Cent of an Empire), 1983
- Kateřina Čapková, "Židovská Strana", in: YIVO Encyclopaedia, YIVO Institute for Jewish Research
- Marie Crhová, “Jewish Politics in Central Europe: The Case of the Jewish Party in Interwar Czechoslovakia,” Jewish Studies at the CEU 2 (1999–2001)
- Branislav Heriban, "Židovské spolky v ČSR 1919 – 1939 so zameraním na Bratislavu", 2011
