= World Agudath Israel =

International Jewish Organization

World Agudath Israel (Hebrew: אגודת ישראל), usually known as the Aguda, was established in the early twentieth century as the political arm of Ashkenazi Torah Judaism. It succeeded Agudath Shlomei Emunei Yisroel (Union of Faithful Jewry) in 1912. Its base of support was located in Eastern Europe before the Second World War but, due to the revival of the Hasidic movement, it included Orthodox Jews throughout Europe. Prior to World War II and the Holocaust, Agudath Israel operated a number of Jewish educational institutions throughout Europe. After the war, it has continued to operate such institutions in the United States as Agudath Israel of America, and in Israel. Agudath Israel is guided by its Moetzes Gedolei HaTorah (Council of Sages) in Israel and the US.

== History ==
=== Katowice Conference ===
World Agudath Israel was established by Jewish religious leaders at a conference held at Kattowitz (Katowice) in 1912. They were concerned that the Tenth Zionist Congress had defeated a motion by the Torah Nationalists Mizrachi movement for funding religious schools.

Among the chief founders of the organization were Jacob Rosenheim (one of the leaders of German Jewry), and Rabbi Avrohom Mordechai Alter (the fourth Gerrer Rebbe). The aim of World Agudath Israel was to strengthen Orthodox institutions independent of the Zionist movement and Mizrachi organization. The advent of the First World War delayed development of the organisation, however.

=== World War I, interbellum, World War II ===
During the First World War, Rabbi Dr. Pinchas Kohn and Rabbi Dr. Emmanuel Carlebach (both from Germany), were appointed as the rabbinical advisors to the German occupying forces in Poland. In this position, they worked closely with the Grand Rabbi of Ger, Rabbi Avraham Mordechai Alter. As a result of this collaboration, they developed the Agudath Israel organization, with the aim of unifying Eastern European and Western European Orthodox Judaism.

Agudath Israel gained a significant following, particularly among Hasidic Jews. It had representatives running in the Polish elections after the First World War, and they won seats in that country's parliament (Sejm). Among the elected representatives were Alexander Zusia Friedman, Rabbi Meir Shapiro, Rabbi Yosef Nechemya Kornitzer of Kraków, and Rabbi Aharon Lewin of Reysha.

Prominent Torah scholars who led Agudath Yisroel included the Gerrer Rebbe, the Radziner Rebbe, Rabbi Mordechai Yosef Elazar Leiner, and the Chafetz Chaim. In Latvia between 1922 and 1934, members of the Agudath Israel faction, led by Mordechai Dubin, were elected to Saeima (The Parliament). Another prominent member of Agudath Israel was Michoel Ber Weissmandl. In Lithuania, Agudath Israel was active inside of Achdus, which merged into the Jewish Economical and Religious Party, and in Czechoslovakia, Agudath Israel first founded the Jewish Conservative Party, which than merged into the Jewish Economic Party and lastly into the Jewish Republican Party.

In the United Kingdom, the Agudath Israel movement was represented by the Adath Israel Synagogue, formed in 1909, and the Union of Orthodox Hebrew Congregations, formed in 1926. By 1943 Agudath Israel represented approximately 5000 families and was led by Rabbi Dr Solomon Schonfeld. The British secretary of the Agudath Israel World Organization, the political wing of the movement, was Harry Goodman, publisher and editor of Jewish Weekly. He played a key part in maintaining the Agudath Israel organization through World War II.

=== Post-World War II ===
In the post-war period, Agudath Israel was active in Europe to provide aid for Holocaust survivors. There was a branch in the World Agudath Israel World Organization in England located at 37/38 Mitre Street in London. Another branch was located in Switzerland, located at 59 Lavaterstrasseled which was led by Dr. Shlomo Ehrman. There were also branches in Allied-occupied Germany. The Central-Committee of Agudath Israel of the British Zone was led by Rabbi Yisroel Moshe Olewski, Rabbi Shlomo Zev Zweigenhaft and Efraim Londoner and was located in Bergen-Belsen. Yehuda Leib Girsht represented Agudath Israel on the camp committee of Bergen Belsen. The Central Committee of Agudath Israel of the American Zone was led by H. Parasol and N. Braunfeld and was located at Trogerstrasse 58/4 in Munich.

== Agudath Israel and the State of Israel ==
When Israel was founded, Agudath Israel reached a modus vivendi with the State of Israel, which was predominantly led by secularists. It helped secure an agreement between Ashkenazi rabbinical leaders and David Ben-Gurion which ensured Ashkenazi rabbinical co-ordination with the state, as well as the implementation of such guarantees as public observance consistent with the laws of the Sabbath and Kashrut. It has established itself as an Israeli political party winning seats in the Knesset either as the Agudat Israel or in coalition with other Orthodox groups running under the name United Torah Judaism.

== The Great Congress ==
The World Agudath Israel federation held international conferences and Torah congressional meetings known as HaKnessia HaGedolah (Hebrew: הכנסייה הגדולה, lit. 'The Great Congress'), which included many of its spiritual and political leaders, from Israel and around the world. To date, six congresses have been held, the last of which was in 1980. They were in 1923, 1929, 1937, 1954, 1964, and 1980.

== See also ==
- Agudath Israel of America
- Agudat Israel
- Moetzes Gedolei HaTorah
- Jewish fundamentalism

== Bibliography ==
- Gershon C.Bacon, The Politics of Tradition: Agudat Israel in Poland, 1916-1939, The Magnes Press, Jerusalem, 1996, ISBN 965-223-962-3
