= Jewish Party (Czechoslovakia) =

Jewish Party אידישע פּאַרטיי (Yiddish) Židovská strana (Czech and Slovak)
- Leader: Ludvík Singer; Angelo Goldstein; Emil Margulies
- Founded: 1919
- Dissolved: 1938
- Ideology: Zionism
- Political position: Centre to centre-left
- International affiliation: World Zionist Organization

The Jewish Party (Czech: Židovská strana) was a political party of the First Czechoslovak Republic. It was founded in 1919 by the Jewish National Council (Czech: Národní rada židovská) in Prague. It was the strongest Jewish political party in the interwar Czechoslovakia although many Jews were rather active in non-Jewish parties, be they Czech, German or Hungarian. The party adopted a Zionist political program and succeeded in influencing the Czechoslovak government to acknowledge Jews as an official national minority in the constitution of 1920.

In an electoral alliance with parties of the Polish minority, it got two candidates elected (Julius Reisz and Ludvík Singer, and from 1931 Angelo Goldstein, after the death of Singer) at the 1929 Czechoslovak parliamentary elections and again two (Angelo Goldstein and Chaim Kugel) at the 1935 Czechoslovak parliamentary elections on a common ticket with the Czechoslovak Social Democratic Worker's Party and the Polish Socialist Workers Party.

It was banned in Slovakia after the German occupation of Czechoslovakia on 25 November 1938 and de facto after the end of the Second Czechoslovak Republic on 15 March 1939.

== Election results ==
Jewish party or list	1920 (Note: in 1920 there was no parliamentary election organized in Carpathian Ruthenia)	1925
United list of Jewish parties	79,714 votes, 1,3%, no seat Bohemia: 19,473 votes, 0.57%, Moravia-Silesia: 15,024 votes, 1.04%, Slovakia: 45,217 votes, 3.37%	-
Jewish Party	-	98,845 votes, 1.39%, no seat Senate: 51,513 votes, no seat
Jewish Economic Party	-	16,861 votes, 0.24% no list for the Senate
